= Jules de Jongh =

American voice actress

- Born: California, United States
- Education: California Institute of the Arts
- Occupation: Voice actress
- Years active: 1995–present
- Website: julesvoice.co.uk

Jules de Jongh is an American voice actress. She provided the voices of Yugo and Evangelyne in the first two seasons of Wakfu: The Animated Series, the voice of the protagonist Faith from the video game Mirror's Edge, and the voice of several characters in Thomas & Friends. She also voiced Skunk, the protagonist from the British-Irish animated series Skunk Fu!. She writes primarily animated feature films, with her first out in 2025, Spiked, and another, Dudley and the Invasion of the Space Slugs, to be released in 2026. She has several other films in pre-production.

== Life and career ==
She was born in California, and raised in Visalia. Following training at the California Institute of the Arts in theater, she went on to appear in a number of Hollywood films but disliked moving from one location to another during production.

== Filmography ==
=== Films and television ===
List of voice performances in films and television
Year	Title	Role(s)	Notes	Source
2000–02	Fix & Foxi and Friends	Mama		
2001–02	Xcalibur	Tara		
2001	Tootuff	Nadia, Frankie, Sophie, Additional voices		
2002–04	Fimbles	Florrie	US role	
2003	The Haunted Pumpkin of Sleepy Hollow	Kate, Mrs. Wentworth	US role	
2003	Shtoing Circus		English dub	
2003–04	The Adventures of Little Brown Bear	Little Brown Bear, Little Red Bear, Little Grey Bear		
2003–05	Little Robots	Tiny		
2005	New Captain Scarlet	Lieutenant Green		
2006–07	Lola & Virginia	Virginia	US role	
2006	Four Eyes!	Emma		
2006	The Jungle Book: Rikki-Tikki-Tavi to the Rescue		Part of the BKN Classic Series trilogy	
2007–08	Skunk Fu!	Duck, Crane, Skunk		
2007	Mama Mirabelle's Home Movies	Bo	US role	
2008	Chop Socky Chooks	Siren Sung, Cabbage Lady and Cho		
2008	Freefonix	Mostart		
2009	Lulu's Islands	Erik and Lulu	English dub	
2009	Hero of the Rails	Emily, Mavis and The Duchess of Boxford	Film; supporting US voice role	
2009	Bunny Maloney	Candy Bunny	English dub	
2009–10	Angelina Ballerina: The Next Steps	Marco, Viki	US role	
2009–10	Lou!	Lou's Mother	English dub	
2009–2020	Thomas & Friends	Emily, Rosie (US: 2010–2012), Mavis (US: 2009–2012), Bridget Hatt (US: 2010), Lady Hatt (US: 2010–2012), The Duchess of Boxford, The Teacher, The Laundry Lady and The Blond-haired Boy (US) Caitlin and Allicia Botti	Voice role	
2010	Misty Island Rescue	Emily	Film; supporting US voice role	
2011	Poppy Cat	Additional voices	Series 2	
2011	Day of the Diesels	Emily, Mavis and Lady Hatt	Film; US voice role	
2011	Tinga Tinga Tales	Bat	US role	
2011–14	Lucky Fred	Nora		
2011–12	Fleabag Monkeyface	Gene and Gwendolina		
2012	Blue Mountain Mystery	Emily and Mavis	Film; supporting US voice role	
2012	Scary Larry		English dub	
2013	Groove High	Vic		
2013	Lulu Zipadoo	Yay Nay and Frou Frou		
2013	Sandra the Fairytale Detective	Sandra		
2013	Wakfu: The Animated Series	Yugo and Evangylene		
2013	Invizimals	Hiro		
2013	King of the Railway	Emily	Film; supporting US voice role	
2014	Tale of the Brave	Emily	Film; supporting US voice role	
2014	Boyster	Boyster's Mom and Alicia's Mom		
2014	Poppy Cat	Additional voices	Series 2	
2014	Ronja, the Robber's Daughter	Harpy		
2015	Sodor's Legend of the Lost Treasure	Emily	Film; minor US voice role	
2015–2020	Floogals	Flo, Mom Hooman		
2016	My Knight and Me	Jimmy the Squire, The Queen, The Dark Forest Witch		
2016	Thomas & Friends: The Great Race	Emily	UK singing voice; uncredited main US voice role	
2017	Journey Beyond Sodor	Emily	Film; minor US voice role	
2018	Big World! Big Adventures!	Emily	US voice; film	
2018	Furiki Wheels	Moka, Pepita		
2018	Johnny English Strikes Again	Xander		
2018–2019	Lilybuds	Zinnia, Plum	English dub	
2019	Mush-Mush and the Mushables	Mush-Mush, Chanterelle		
2019	Hache	Reversion		English dub
2019	Buñuel in the Labyrinth of the Turtles	Film; Conchita		
2021	Baby Alive	Charlie, Siena, Tilly		
2021	Superhero Kindergarten	Pedro, Guillermo		
2021	Baby Alive	Pedro, Guillermo		
2021	The Canterville Ghost	Kent & Louis Otis	Film	
2022	Ellie and the Christmas Creep	Film; co-screenwriter		
2022	The Creature Cases		Voice role	
2023	Odd-Paw Vet	Billie		
2024-2025	Super Happy Magic Forest	Twinkle		
2025	Spiked	Doris, Fleur		
2025-2026	Dudley and the Invasion of the Space Slugs	Drakz		

=== Video games ===
List of voice performances in video games
Year	Title	Role	Notes	Source
1996	Bud Tucker in Double Trouble	Lola		
1997	Need for Speed II	Race Narrator		
2001	Moon Tycoon	Additional Voices		
2003	XGRA: Extreme G Racing Association	Additional Voices		
2003	Alias	Additional Voices		
2004	Street Racing Syndicate	Additional Voices		
2005	Big Mutha Truckers 2	Additional Voices		
2005	Burnout Revenge	Race Narrator		
2007	Crackdown	Additional Voices		
2007	The Witcher	Triss Merigold		
2007	Dead or Alive Xtreme Beach Volleyball	Additional Voices		
2008	Hot Shots Golf: Out of Bounds	Kate, Eva		
2008	Hot Shots Golf: Open Tee 2	Madison, Lee		
2008	Mirror's Edge	Faith Connors		
2008	Burnout Paradise	Race Narrator		
2008	Mirror's Edge 2D	Faith Connors	No new dialogue. Voice clips taken from the original Mirror's Edge.	
2008	So Blonde	Morgane Castillo		
2009	Overlord: Dark Legend	Doris and Little Red		
2009	Killzone 2	Evelyn Batton		
2010	Mirror's Edge	Faith Connors	No new dialogue. Voice clips taken from the original Mirror's Edge.	
2010	Overlord II	Juno		
2010	Just Cause 2	Maria Kane		
2010	Need for Speed: Hot Pursuit	Race Narrator		
2010	Dead Nation	Scarlett Blak		
2011	Driver: San Francisco	Dispatch		
2011	Anno 2070	E.V.E.		
2011	LittleBigPlanet 2	Eve Silva Paragorica, Wonder Woman		
2012	LittleBigPlanet PS Vita	Wonder Woman		
2012	Need for Speed: Most Wanted	Race Narrator		
2012	Kinect Sports	Additional Voices		
2012	Captain Morgane and the Golden Turtle	Morgane Castillo		
2013	Remember Me	Madame		
2013	Puppeteer	General Horse		
2013	Lego City Undercover	Natalia Kowalski		
2013	Need for Speed: Rivals	Race Narrator		
2013	Jack Keane 2: The Fire Within	Additional Voices		
2013	Killzone: Shadow Fall	Vektan Newsreader, Citizen		
2013	Diggs Nightcrawler	Itsy Bitsy Spider		
2013	Lego Legend of Chima			
2013	Zoo Tycoon			
2013	Battle World Kronos			
2013	Omerta			
2013	Warface			
2014	Sacred 3	Elf		
2014	The Crew			
2014	Escape Dead Island	Linda Waterson, Xian Mei		
2014	Transformers Universe			
2015	Grey Goo			
2015	Batman: Arkham Knight	Christina Bell, Additional Voices		
2015	Lego Ninjago: Shadow of Ronin	Lloyd and Nya		
2015	Block and Load			
2015	Star Wars Battlefront			
2015	Anno 2205			
2015	Blues and Bullets			
2015	Lego Dimensions			
2016	Excubitor			
2016	Batman: Arkham VR	Batcomputer, Vicki Vale, Police Dispatcher		
2016	Quantum Break	Clarice Ogawa		
2016	Steep	Isabel		
2017	Mass Effect: Andromeda	Cora Harper		
2017	Xenoblade Chronicles 2	Brighid, Boreas, Finch		
2017	Lego Marvel Superheroes 2	Captain Marvel		
2017	Star Wars Battlefront II	Stormtrooper		
2017	Horizon: Zero Dawn	Beladga, Ullia		
2017	Total War: Warhammer II			
2018	Xenoblade Chronicles 2: Torna – The Golden Country	Brighid		
2018	State of Mind	Minerva		
2019	Just Cause 4	Maria Kane	Danger Rising DLC	
2019	Layers of Fear 2	Adult Lily		
2019	Irony Curtain: From Matryoshka with Love	Officer		
2019	City Z	voice		
2019	Another Eden: The Cat Beyond Time and Space	Nopaew		
2020	Chicken Police	Natasha Catzenko		
2020	Bleeding Edge	Buttercup		
2020	Trine 4	Melody		
2020	Project CARS 3	Narrator		
2021	Encased: A Sci-Fi Post-Apocalyptic RPG	Margarita Tkachenko		
2021	Supercells Brawl Stars Championship			
2021	Battlefield 2042	Soldier		
2022	Horizon Forbidden West	Additional voices		
2023	Atomic Heart	TER-A1 Treshkova		
2023	Layers of Fear	Adult Lily		
2023	Everybody 1-2 Switch	Voice		
2023	RoboCop: Rogue City	Samantha Ortiz		
2024	Stellar Blade	Additional voices		
2024	Closer the Distance	Gayla		
2024	Wizardry Variants Daphne	Additional voices		
2024	Chicken Police: Into the Hive!	Mercedes		
2025	Battlefield 6	Nato Radio Support Soldier		
2025	Wreckreation	The voice		
2025	Unbeatable	Beat's Mom		

=== Web ===
List of voice performances in web series
Year	Title	Role	Notes	Source
2016–present	Baby Alive (YouTube series)	Charlie, Tilly, Siena, Ellie, Belle, Bex		
