= Still Alive (disambiguation) =

"Still Alive" is the closing credits song from the Portal video game.

Still Alive may also refer to:

- "Still Alive", the theme song from the video game Mirror's Edge
  - Still Alive: The Remixes, an extended soundtrack for the game
- Still Alive (album), the album by DJ Mayonnaise
- "Still Alive", a remix on and repackage of the EP Alive by BigBang
- Still Alive (book), by Ruth Kluger
- "Still Alive", a song by 3 Doors Down from Us and the Night
- "Still Alive" (Demi Lovato song), a 2023 song by American singer Demi Lovato
- "Seimei/Still Alive", a single by Japanese rock band B'z
