= Miskovsky =

Miskovsky is a surname. Notable people with the surname include:

- Carolina Miskovsky (born 1978), Swedish musician
- George Miskovsky, American politician
- Lisa Miskovsky (born 1975), Swedish-Finnish-Czech musician and singer-songwriter
- Milan C. Miskovsky (1926–2009), American CIA member
