= Bernard Loomis =

American toy developer

- Born: July 4, 1923; New York City, U.S.
- Died: June 2, 2006 (aged 82); Palm Beach Gardens, Florida, U.S.
- Education: New York University
- Occupations: Toy developer; marketer

Bernard Loomis (July 4, 1923 – June 2, 2006) was an American toy developer and marketer who introduced some of the world's most notable brands, including Chatty Cathy, Barbie, Hot Wheels, Baby Alive, and Strawberry Shortcake. Perhaps his biggest marketing success was bringing a then-unknown film property called Star Wars to the toy shelves.

Every toy company he worked for (Mattel, General Mills' Kenner division, and Hasbro) became "the world's largest toy company" during his tenures in each company.

He also coined the word "toyetic" in a conversation with Steven Spielberg about translating his Close Encounters of the Third Kind into figures.

== Early life, family and education ==
Loomis was born on July 4, 1923, in the Bronx, New York City, New York. According to Loomis, he was raised modestly during the Great Depression family was poor, and had few toys. He instead enjoyed baseball playing cards and playing with Lionel train catalogs.

During World War II, Loomis served in the Army Air Forces in the Philippines. After the war, he attended New York University, where he completed his studies and began his career in sales and marketing.

== Mattel years (1960–1970) ==
In 1960, Loomis became a part of the Mattel Toys sales department. From there, he moved up to marketing popular brands such as Barbie and developed a sales and marketing strategy for the Chatty Cathy talking doll.

In 1968, Loomis began developing ways to promote the new Hot Wheels boy car line for the company. One of the marketing concepts he thought of was creating an animated series based on the property, which premiered on September 6, 1969 on ABC in the US. This was the first series to be explicitly spawned from a toyline, whereas it was usually toylines that spawned from existing series. The Federal Communications Commission declared the series wasn't entertainment, but rather a thirty-minute commercial for Hot Wheels. ABC cancelled the series in 1971, but by then Loomis was already at his next toy company, General Mills.

The Hot Wheel series is the reason why Loomis was dubbed by writer David Owen "The Man Who Invented Saturday Morning" back in 1988.

== Kenner years and Star Wars (1970–1984) ==
While at General Mills' Kenner division, Loomis helped transform that company's fortunes around, transitioning it into the world's largest toy company as he had done earlier at Mattel. He helped develop and market several popular brands, including The Six Million Dollar Man, The Bionic Woman, Play-Doh, Baby Alive, and others.

Loomis's connection with Star Wars began after he read an article in The Hollywood Reporter about the film still in production. He was fascinated by the name, but Kenner wasn't interested in any other boys' toys properties at the time since they manufactured the still-popular Six-Million Dollar Man toyline and developing another based on Man from Atlantis. When the movie came out in 1977, there were no toys connected to Star Wars, so Loomis pursued the license from Twentieth Century Fox and Lucasfilm. He was also the person responsible for the "Early Bird" diorama set for Christmas 1977, which promised the holder would get figures when they first come out in early 1978. The set sold over 500,000 orders.

In 1981, Loomis founded the Manufacturing and Design (MAD) group at General Mills, which was responsible for developing new toy properties and strengthening existing ones. MAD launched a deal with American Greetings to develop and license properties such as Strawberry Shortcake and Care Bears.

== Hasbro and beyond (1984–2006) ==
Loomis's profile was smaller in the latter half of the 1980s until recent years. He worked at Hasbro in the development department helping transition that company into becoming the world's largest toy company, although his role was limited. He did develop a few brands, most notably the Milton Bradley board game Stage Two. After he left Hasbro in 1988, he formed his own development firm, Bernard Loomis, Inc., which developed numerous products. The best-known product from this period in his career was the girls' toyline Quints, which were produced by Tyco Toys.

He was inducted into the Toy Industry Hall of Fame in 1992.

Loomis died of heart disease on June 2, 2006, at his home in Palm Beach Gardens, Florida, at the age of 82.
