= Violent Sky =

Studio album by Lisa Miskovsky
- Released: January 28, 2011
- Recorded: Decibel Studios, Högalid Studio, Lisa's House (Stockholm, Sweden)
- Genres: Indie pop, pop rock, dream pop
- Label: Sony Music Entertainment Sweden
- Producer: Björn Yttling

Lisa Miskovsky chronology
Changes (2006)	Violent Sky (2011)

Singles from Violent Sky
- 1. "Lover" Released: September 24, 2010; 2. "Got A Friend" Released: January 18, 2011

Violent Sky is the fourth studio album by the Swedish singer-songwriter Lisa Miskovsky, released on January 28, 2011. Violent Sky is her first long play for five years since the 2006 album Changes. It was produced by Bjorn Yttling of Peter, Bjorn and John.

== Reception ==
=== Critical response ===
Professional ratings
Review scores
Source	Rating
Aftonbladet	2/5 stars
Arbetarbladet	3/5 stars
DI Weekend	4/5 stars
Expressen	3/5 stars
Gaffa	5/6 stars
Göteborgs-Posten	3/5 stars
Nöjesguiden	3/6 stars
Nya Wermlands-Tidningen	4/5 stars
Svenska Dagbladet	2/6 stars

Violent Sky received mixed to positive reviews from music critics. The Swedish website, Kritiker, which assigns a normalised rating out of 5.0 to reviews from mainstream critics across the country gave the album an average score of 3.2, based on 19 reviews, which indicates mixed to favourable reviews. This score was just below that given to 2006's Changes which scored a 3.4 and below the 3.6 awarded to 2003's Fallingwater.

=== Commercial performance ===
Upon its release, Violent Sky debuted at number four on the Swedish Album Chart for the week of February 4, 2011. This follows the number two debut of Miskovsky's previous album and became her lowest debut position since her first album, excluding the compilation album released in 2008 that debuted at number fifteen. The album fell to number seven the following week and fell steadily for the next four weeks. On its sixth week on release, the album fell outside the top forty, before regaining ground and making its way back up to number twenty-two in mid-April. It then left the chart, and re-entered on a few occasions later in the year. In total, the album spent 13 weeks on the Swedish Albums Chart.

== Track listing ==
1. "This Fire"
2. "Got A Friend"
3. "Lover"
4. "Silver Shoes"
5. "Some of Us"
6. "Call Me Anything But My Name"
7. "Get It On"
8. "Wise Guy 2010"
9. "Let Them Come"
10. "A Little High"
11. "Got A Friend" (Acoustic Version)

== Charts ==
=== Weekly charts ===
Chart (2011)	Peak position
Swedish Albums (Sverigetopplistan)	4

=== Year-end charts ===
Chart (2011)	Position
Swedish Albums (Sverigetopplistan)	91
