= Solar Fields =

Swedish electronic music artist

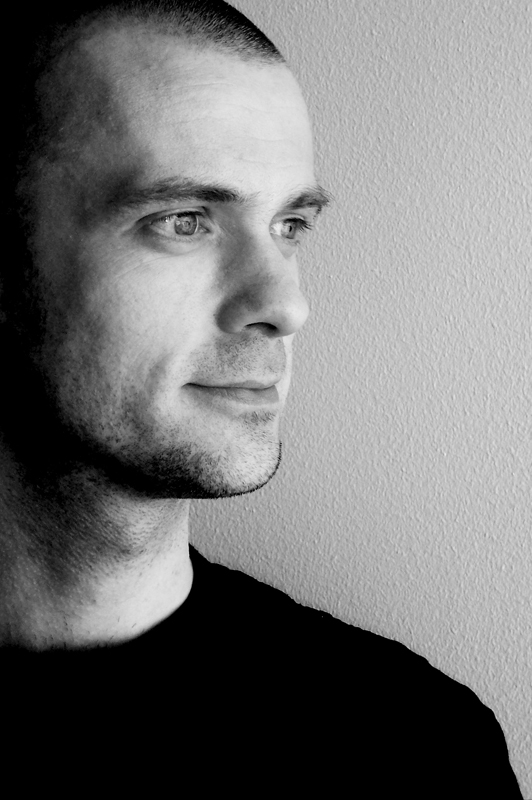
- Magnus Birgersson

Background information
- Origin: Gothenburg, Sweden
- Genres: Psybient, IDM, downtempo, progressive trance, ambient
- Years active: 2001–present
- Labels: Ultimae Records, Joof Recordings
- Members: Magnus Birgersson
- Website: solarfields.com

Magnus Birgersson, better known by his stage name Solar Fields, is a Swedish electronic music artist. As of 2014, he has released fifteen albums, and has also scored all interactive in-game music for the Electronic Arts game Mirror's Edge as well as its reboot, Mirror's Edge Catalyst. His latest album, Formations, was released in November 2022.

== Biography ==
Gothenburg-based Swedish composer, sound designer, and multi-instrumentalist Magnus Birgersson created Solar Fields in the late 1990s.

Birgersson was raised in a musical family and began playing piano and synthesizers in the 1970s. In the mid-1980s he began combining synthesizers with computers. In addition to his ambient work, he has also been a guitar player in rock bands, a pianist in jazz funk bands, and keyboard player in drum and bass bands.

He has collaborated with Vincent Villuis, a.k.a. AES Dana, on H.U.V.A. Network and T.S.R. in the company of Daniel Segerstad and Johannes Hedberg from Carbon Based Lifeforms.

Under the moniker Solar Fields he composed 15 albums and appeared on over 60 various compilations. His first solo release was an ambient album named Reflective Frequencies, released on Ultimae in 2001. This was followed two years later by Blue Moon Station, which also included downtempo and trance, and was designed as a single fluid story. In late 2005, Solar Fields composed Leaving Home and Extended.

His fifth album Earthshine, launched in 2007, featured more upbeat soundscapes blending morning trance, progressive, psychedelic, tribal and ambient music. This led to Electronic Arts and DICE commissioning Solar Fields for the in-game score for Mirror's Edge, a first-person action adventure video game released worldwide in November 2008.

The following year, Solar Fields composed Movements. This album was also used as the soundtrack for the indie game Capsized from Alientrap in 2011. In 2010, he used the harmonies and melodies of Movements in a remix album titled Altered - Second Movements and started the Origin series, four albums which aim to present archives and unreleased songs. Until We Meet the Sky and Random Friday were composed in parallel.

In 2013, he released the second album in the Origin series, Origin # 02. He released his demo song "Cluster" later that year. His song "Pulse", along with a remix of it by Airwave, was released in June 2014 by Joof Recordings. In July 2014, he released the compilations Red, Green and Blue (collectively known as R.G.B.), featuring remasters, remixes and alternate versions of previously released tracks. In September 2015, it was announced by DICE and Birgersson that he was creating the in-game score of Mirror's Edge: Catalyst. In March 2018, his album Ourdom was released. In June 2019, he released the third album in the Origin series, Origin # 03. In November 2019, he released his first EP, Undiscovered Stories. In August 2020, he hosted a live stream in collaboration with Messed!Up Magazine called Studio Jupiter Live Session, and on September 4, 2020, he released an album under the same name. The follow-up to Ourdom, Formations, was released in November 2022, via his own label droneform records.

== Discography ==
=== Studio albums ===
- Reflective Frequencies (2001)
- Blue Moon Station (2003)
- Extended (2005)
- Leaving Home (2005)
- EarthShine (2007)
- Movements (2009)
- Altered – Second Movements (2010)
- Until We Meet the Sky (2011)
- Random Friday (2012)
- Ourdom (2018)
- Formations (2022)

==== Origin Series ====
- Origin#01 (2010)
- Origin#02 (2013)
- Origin#03 (2019)
- Origin#04 (2025)

==== EPs ====
- Undiscovered Stories (2019)
- Versions (2022)

==== Live Albums ====
- Studio Jupiter Live Session (2020)

=== Compilations ===
- Red (2014)
- Green (2014)
- Blue (2014)

=== Soundtracks ===
- 2009: Mirror's Edge
- 2016: Mirror's Edge Catalyst

==== Collaborations ====
- GTCHI97 (1996) (with Carbon Based Lifeforms as TSR)
- Fusion (1998) (with Carbon Based Lifeforms as TSR)
- Distances (2004) (with AES Dana as H.U.V.A. Network)
- Ephemeris (2009) (with AES Dana as H.U.V.A. Network)
- Live at Glastonbury Festival (2010) (with AES Dana as H.U.V.A. Network)
- Ägget (2013) (with Carbon Based Lifeforms as TSR)
