= Toyetic =

Suitability of a media property for merchandising via toys and games

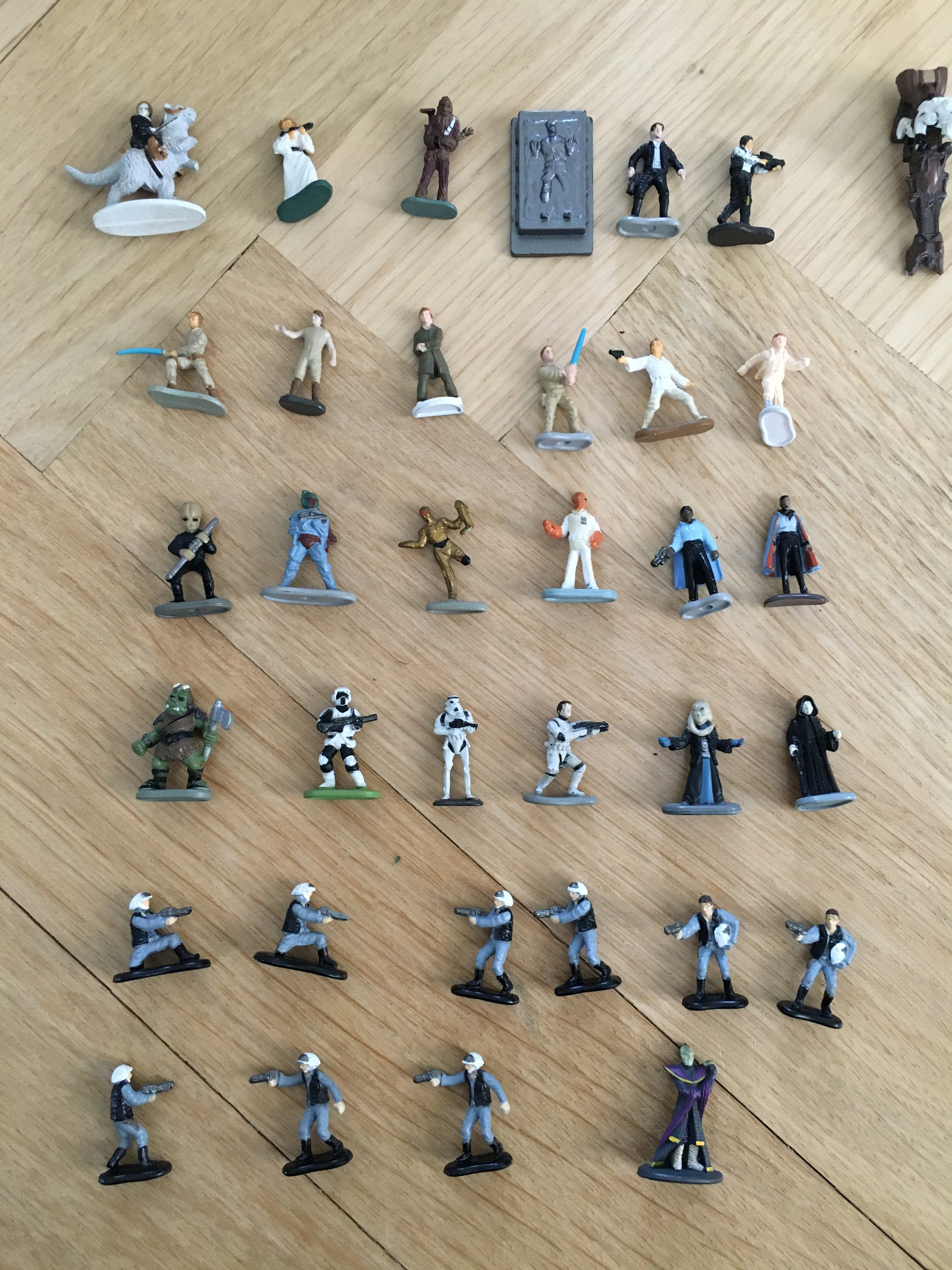
Micro Machines Star Wars figurines

Toyetic is a term that describes the suitability of a media property, such as a cartoon or film, for merchandising tie-in lines of licensed toys, games, and novelties. The term is attributed to Bernard Loomis, a toy-development executive for Kenner Products, in discussing the opportunities for marketing the film Close Encounters of the Third Kind, telling its director Steven Spielberg that the film was not "toyetic" enough; this ultimately led Loomis to acquire the lucrative license for the upcoming Star Wars properties.

== History ==
The concept of toyetic works is stated to have come from Bernard Loomis in 1969, while working at Mattel. With the introduction of the Hot Wheels line of toy cars, Loomis proposed that they also develop a 30-minute television show, Hot Wheels, as a means to promote the toys. The Federal Communications Commission (FCC) reviewed the show and determined that the program needed to be treated as advertising, which affected the records of the network, forcing the show to be taken off the air within two years. Loomis later moved on to the Kenner Products division of General Mills; during this time, he had read about the upcoming Star Wars film, and positioned the company to produce toys based on the film. The move was considered highly successful, with over $100 million in annual toy sales following the release of the film.

In the early 1980s, the FCC revised its rules on children's programming, specifically allowing for the use of "character marketing" where shows could employ fictional characters based on toys and other real-world objects without counting towards advertising. Loomis saw the same potential in the Strawberry Shortcake line of toys as he did for Star Wars, and was able to successfully produce a line of specials for Strawberry Shortcake under the less-restrictive FCC guidelines. Following on from Loomis's success, toyetic shows became popular in the 1980s. This was aided by the introduction of cable television that allows for more airtime for new and repeat broadcasts of such shows. The number of toyetic shows waned after 1990 when the United States Congress passed the Children's Television Act which required content to include educational and instructional material for children, and targeted the type of commercial advertising that could accompany these shows.

== Examples ==
Notable examples of toyetic properties include:

- Batman & Robin: Toy companies were reportedly involved in pre-production. Director Joel Schumacher admitted that he was told by Warner Bros. executives to make Batman & Robin "more toyetic". Despite the film's disappointing critical and financial performance, toy revenue was so high that the studio produced more Batman films without Schumacher.
- Star Wars: Although George Lucas wrote the Star Wars saga without considering the toyetic potentials of the film, he insisted that he would keep the merchandising rights before the first film was released. 20th Century Fox underestimated the potential of the film and allowed Lucas to do so, and the film turned out to be a toyetic phenomenon. The Star Wars films have spawned a massive merchandising empire, including toys, action figures, and video games to non-toy merchandise, such as beer steins, spoons, and replicas of the lightsaber hilts.
- Teenage Mutant Ninja Turtles: Based on the 1984 comic series by Kevin Eastman and Peter Laird of the same name, the television shows and films were considered "extremely toyetic", as the toys were "visually appealing—tough yet huggable—and there are enough characters to drive collecting over time", according to Playmates Toys senior vice president Karl Aaronian.
- Transformers: The success of the 2007 film based on the franchise is stated by Lauren A. E. Schuker of The Wall Street Journal to have created a drive in the motion picture industry to seek rights for toy-driven films from other existing properties.

== See also ==
- Intellectual property
- Merchandising
