= Mirror's Edge Catalyst =

2016 video game

- Developer: DICE
- Publisher: Electronic Arts
- Director: Per Juhlén
- Producers: Sara Jansson; Amo Mostofi
- Designer: Erik Odeldahl
- Programmer: Torbjörn Söderman
- Artist: Jhony Ljungstedt
- Writer: Christofer Emgård
- Composer: Solar Fields
- Engine: Frostbite 3
- Platforms: PlayStation 4; Windows; Xbox One
- Release: NA: June 7, 2016; PAL: June 9, 2016
- Genres: Action-adventure, platform
- Modes: Single-player, multiplayer

Mirror's Edge Catalyst is a 2016 first-person action-adventure platform game developed by DICE and published by Electronic Arts. It was released for PlayStation 4, Windows, and Xbox One in June 2016. It is a reboot of the 2008 game that focuses on protagonist Faith Connors.

Upon release, Mirror's Edge Catalyst received mixed reviews from critics, who praised the free-running gameplay and visuals, but criticized its storyline and combat system.

In December 2023, all servers for Mirror's Edge Catalyst were shut down by EA, leaving all multiplayer game features inoperable and some achievements unobtainable.

== Gameplay ==
Pre-alpha gameplay screenshot of Mirror's Edge Catalyst. Like the original game, Faith is able to traverse environments using various environmental objects, such as the walkway rail pictured here.

Mirror's Edge Catalyst is a first-person action-adventure game in which the player takes control of Faith Connors as she progresses through the futuristic city of Glass. Similar to the original Mirror's Edge, players traverse the city using aspects of urban exploration and parkour movements to complete missions and evade or fight enemies. Players can also make use of environmental objects such as zip-lines and ledges, and equipment; this includes a MAG (Manifold Attachment Gear) Rope and a Disruptor to travel across buildings, disable certain systems (such as large fans or security cameras) and aid Faith during combat. When players mark an objective on their map, Faith's "runner vision" is activated and some scenery items automatically highlight in red. These act as guides to lead players towards their objective. The use of levels and linear gameplay found in the first Mirror's Edge has been replaced with an open world, free-roaming environment. This gives players more freedom in traversal, allowing for the use of multiple paths to reach one's objective. In addition to the campaign's mission, side activities such as time trials, races and environmental puzzles are featured. Additionally, items called GridLeaks can be found across the world that can be collected by players.

Combat mechanics of the game received an overhaul and a new combat system was developed as traversal is greatly emphasised in the game. Also, though only used sparingly in the previous game, Mirror's Edge Catalyst has removed the use of guns by the player altogether, focusing on Faith's running and parkour movements and quick melee-style attacks to take down or evade her enemies. Faith enters focus mode while she is running, and with sufficient focus Faith can evade bullets from enemies. According to Sara Jansson, the senior producer of the game, the combat and fighting featured is an extension to the game's movement instead of a separated set. When Faith is performing a finishing move, the game switches to a third-person perspective.

Mirror's Edge Catalyst contained several multiplayer features, which DICE called Social Play. This asynchronous online service has been discontinued on the 9th of December 2023 for PlayStation 4, Xbox One, Steam and EA App. While there are no live co-operative multiplayer or side-by-side competitive modes, the game features asynchronous multiplayer in which a player's actions in the game can affect the world for other players' games. Among these are Time Trials which, unlike in the 2008 game, are not pre-defined by DICE. Instead, these checkpoint-to-checkpoint paths are set by any player whereby others can race against them at their leisure for faster times. Players are also able to place Location Emitters for other players to track down, an exploration activity similar to geocaching.

== Synopsis ==
=== Setting ===
The game takes place in the dystopian, futuristic city of Glass, the showcase city of the nation of Cascadia, governed by a totalitarian corporatocracy. Cascadian society is highly stratified, and most citizens work for the corporations and are connected to the Grid, a massive social surveillance system digitally connecting everything and everyone in cities like Glass. The corporations are secretly preparing to launch a project, called Reflection, to control the populace through the Grid.

So-called Runners, freelance messengers skilled at parkour, refuse to be connected to the Grid and live on rooftops, making their living from covert delivery jobs while evading corporate security. The game centers around a Runner named Faith, and her efforts to help other Runners overthrow the corporate government and stop Reflection.

=== Plot ===
Faith Connors is released from prison and meets with fellow runner Icarus, as well as Runner cabal leader Noah, who raised Faith after the death of her parents. During a data grab, Faith diverges from her orders and retrieves a valuable hard drive, but is seen by Gabriel Kruger, CEO of Kruger Security, or K-Sec. She manages to escape, intending to use the drive's contents to pay her debt to a black market boss. Faith takes the drive to Plastic, a talented hacker, who tells her it contains blueprints for a top-secret project known as Reflection.

While Icarus and Faith are away, K-Sec leads a raid on the Runners' lair and captures or kills everyone present, including Noah. Faith and Icarus, having nowhere to go, turn to Rebecca Thane, leader of Black November, a militant resistance movement. The rebels capture high-ranking K-Sec commander Isabel Kruger, daughter of Gabriel Kruger.

Faith asks Plastic to infiltrate K-Sec servers and gather information about Isabel, who is actually Caitlyn "Cat" Connors, Faith's sister, who was assumed dead. Gabriel Kruger took her in as his adoptive daughter, telling her that Faith was killed along with the rest of her family. Faith races back to the Black November HQ where Thane is preparing to execute Isabel in order to send her father a message. Even though Isabel doesn't seem to remember who Faith is, Faith convinces Thane to save her.

Isabel lets on to Faith that Noah might still be alive and held in a compound. Faith rescues Reflection scientists who were detained there by K-Sec for "asking too many questions." The lead scientist, Aline Maera, explains that Reflection involves injecting the population with nanites that can be remote-controlled to regulate thoughts and emotions. Faith finds Noah who is being experimented on with prototype Reflection nanites, but is too late to prevent his death. Meanwhile at Black November HQ, the rebels are ambushed by K-Sec while moving Isabel above ground. Icarus and the rebels are injected with Reflection nanites.

Plastic and Aline work together to engineer a virus to completely disable Reflection. Faith witnesses a massive explosion at The Shard, the tallest building in all of Glass. Faith goes to the top of The Shard to activate the virus. At the top she is confronted by Gabriel who defends his decision to launch Reflection, saying the nanites are a cure designed to keep Isabel's chronic lung condition at bay, and that the project is about survival rather than control.

They are joined by Isabel who fails to stop the virus. They fight on the helipad, and Isabel accuses Faith of leaving her behind to die, while Faith attempts to remind Isabel of who she really is. Gabriel Kruger appears on a helicopter and begs a hesitating Isabel to come with him. The Shard starts to crumble and Gabriel flies out of the tumbling helicopter. Faith slides to the edge of the helipad but is caught by Isabel. Gabriel calls out for his daughter to save him, and Isabel tells Faith that she "has to" and runs off in his direction. However, as the helicopter rises and flies away, only Isabel is in it, with Gabriel nowhere to be seen.

In the aftermath, it is reported on the news that Isabel will now supersede her missing father as Kruger Security CEO. While there was no uprising in the population, Faith did disable the Reflection launch, thus keeping people safe from Conglomerate control.

== Development ==
The new Mirror's Edge game was officially revealed in June 2013 at the Electronic Arts press event at E3 2013. It was released for PlayStation 4, Windows, and Xbox One in North America on June 7, 2016, and in Europe, Australia, and New Zealand on June 9. The game was announced soon after as a prequel to Mirror's Edge showcasing the origins of Faith, and uses the Frostbite engine, instead of the Unreal Engine used in the first game. However, at a later date Sara Jansson stated that the game was not seen as either a reboot or a prequel. Electronic Arts also confirmed in 2013 that the game would be an "open-world action adventure". According to DICE's general manager Karl Magnus Troedsson, the game focuses on the first-person combat mechanics building upon the first-person movement mechanics that were present in the first game. As the game features a free-roaming environment, the runner vision from the first game had been completely redesigned to adapt this structure. The runner vision in Catalyst can recalculate the path for players towards their objectives or waypoints.

In January 2014, writer Rhianna Pratchett announced on Twitter that she would not be involved with the new game and neither would most of the original team. Mirror's Edge was confirmed to have a planned release date of February 23, 2016 before it was delayed.

The title Mirror's Edge Catalyst was formally announced in June 2015 prior to E3 2015; DICE product manager Sara Jansson affirmed that the game is not a sequel but would delve into more of Faith's past while expanding on the original game's first-person perspective experience. On June 15, at E3, and later on the Mirror's Edge YouTube channel, DICE released a new trailer for Mirror's Edge Catalyst, revealing elements of the game's storyline and environment. It was confirmed that the game would feature an open-world design and Faith would no longer be able to use guns.

On September 30, 2015, it was announced that the soundtrack composer for the original Mirror's Edge, Solar Fields would again compose for Catalyst. He collaborated with Scottish synth-pop band Chvrches to create an original song for the game's soundtrack entitled "Warning Call".

On October 29, 2015, it was announced that the game had been delayed until May 24, 2016 to allow additional development time and for DICE to refine the traversal gameplay. On April 21, 2016, it was announced that the game had been delayed until June 7, 2016, to allow optimisation and perfection of Social Play. The game's Collector Edition was released alongside the main game. It included a figurine of Faith, a steel book, a lithograph, temporary tattoos, and a storage box.

A prequel comic book called Mirror's Edge: Exordium, leading towards the storyline of Mirror's Edge Catalyst, was published on September 9, 2015, by Dark Horse Comics. In May 2016, Endemol Shine North America announced that they are producing a TV show based on the Mirror's Edge franchise. However, nothing has been said about it since.

== Reception ==
Reception

Aggregate score
Aggregator	Score
Metacritic	PC: 74/100; PS4: 69/100; XONE: 72/100

Review scores
Publication	Score
Destructoid	8.5/10
Electronic Gaming Monthly	6/10
Game Informer	6.5/10
GameRevolution	3.5/5
GameSpot	7/10
GamesRadar+	3/5
IGN	6.8/10
PC Gamer (US)	78/100
Polygon	8/10

Edit on Wikidata

Mirror's Edge Catalyst received "mixed or average" reviews from critics, according to review aggregator website Metacritic.

Chris Carter from Destructoid gave the game a positive review, commending the focus on open world gameplay, saying that the game "nails" exploration and parkour movement. He felt that because the gameplay was fun overall, players could spend an endless amount of time roaming the game world. Carter also called the overall visuals "beautiful" and felt that the design of the environments help create a world that is full of life. Carter disliked the story, however, for being predictable and featuring unlikeable supporting characters but said it was forgivable because players are able to ignore it and focus on the gameplay aspects.

While citing the movement system as a positive and the combat mechanics as a negative, Spencer Campbell concluded his review for Electronic Gaming Monthly with: "Mirror's Edge Catalyst has a strong core built by its movement system, but when it comes time to do anything else than run from point A to point B, you'll probably be more inclined to run away."

Game Informer's Ben Reeves summarised his review with: "The original Mirror's Edge is an overlooked gem from last generation, but even diehard fans will have trouble finding the diamonds in this rough." Reeves disliked the design of the game's environments, calling them "barren" and "lifeless", criticised the melee combat for feeling like a chore, stated that the soundtrack lacked defining characteristics, called the main story "rushed", and felt that the side-content was "boring".

Game Revolution's Peter Paras called the game's environments "gorgeous" and "unique", commended the large amount of content, and praised the visuals of the cutscenes. Paras thought that the gameplay was "unintuitive" and "clunky", however, and strongly disliked the story and characters. Paras also experienced some technical issues, thought that character animations were "poor", and said that the design of the menus was "strange".

Scott Butterworth of GameSpot gave particular praise to the movement mechanics, saying that they consistently wowed him throughout the entire game and made up for the various shortcomings he experienced. Butterworth also liked the varied mix of side-content and called the open world exploration "rewarding". Butterworth's main criticisms were concerning the "mediocre" story and the "clunky" combat.

GamesRadar's Leon Hurley stated: "Mirror's Edge Catalyst is an interesting game with some strong ideas but not enough variety." Hurley praised the visuals but called the combat "terrible". Ryan McCaffrey for IGN summarised his review with: "Mirror's Edge's return shines in some regards, but is ultimately a disappointment." McCaffrey complimented the user-generated content and parkour gameplay but criticised the story and characters, as well as the "uneven" combat and inconsistent visuals.

Arthur Gies of Polygon wrote: "I imagine most players will happily bounce from side mission to delivery to grid node and back again, content to do what Mirror's Edge has always been best at: constantly moving forward and up. And once you can focus on that, Mirror's Edge Catalyst is a flawed, but often great breath of something different and exciting in an open-world landscape full of the same old thing."

=== Sales ===
Mirror's Edge Catalyst was the second-best-selling retail game in the United Kingdom in its first week of release, only behind Overwatch. In its second week of release, the game became the sixth-best-selling retail game of the week.
