= Atlantis Underwater Tycoon =

2003 video game

- Developer(s): Anarchy Enterprises
- Publisher(s): Activision Value
- Producer(s): Alex Jamieson, Zvonimir Miksic, Tim Whitehurst
- Designer(s): Joseph Cho
- Platform(s): Microsoft Windows
- Release: March 21, 2003
- Genre(s): City-building, construction and management, business simulation
- Mode(s): Single-player

Atlantis Underwater Tycoon is an underwater city-building simulation game in which the player acts as a tycoon to simulate the real-time design and management of an underwater civilization. It was developed by American studio Anarchy Enterprises and published by Activision Value, and released on March 21, 2003, for Microsoft Windows.

Atlantis Underwater Tycoon was the first building sim to be set underwater.

== Gameplay ==
In Atlantis Underwater Tycoon, the player can choose to play in missions or in a sandbox-environment map to start building their underwater colony. The player chooses a tycoon character to play as who comes with their own positive and negative traits, such as providing bonus starting money, or having a disreputable attitude towards sea life.

The player starts on the ocean floor with a home base and a set amount of money. The player then expands the underwater colony by constructing various residential, utility, commercial, industrial, tourist, and military buildings that extend outward from the home base in a design conducive to the ocean floor, linking them with air tubes, and terraforming the seabed if needed. The player is able to collect and store items produced by commercial and industrial buildings in warehouses and sell them off in a market. The player can also breed new wildlife to live in the city's waters, such as dolphins or sharks, as well as create underwater vehicles to roam around the city. As the city grows, a wider range of buildings and residents become available. Such buildings include whale sanctuaries, sea turtle aquariums, shopping malls, oil drills, and prison facilities. New and better buildings bring in more citizens and tourists, generating more income for the city. Over time, buildings nearing their life expectancies can be demolished to make room for new buildings. In the late stages of the game, the player can unlock the ability to build Atlantean structures.

In addition to having to manage the economic aspects of the game, the player must also contend with attacks from enemy pirates and from enemy Atlanteans, as well as deal with underwater natural disasters. Military vessels and friendly Atlantean defenders can be recruited to defend against such attacks. Military defenses, such as sonic cannons and missile turrets, can be controlled by the player to shoot projectiles at hostile vessels and destructive debris to destroy them.

On the whole, the player prevents the city from falling into harm by keeping a watchful eye out for enemy invaders and natural disasters, while managing the city's businesses so that population happiness, tourism, and sea life can prosper, all the while avoiding the city plunging into financial trouble.

== Reception ==
Reception

Review scores
Publication	Score
GameWatcher	7.5/10
PC Games (Germany)	57%
JeuxVideoPC.com	9/20
GameStar (Germany)	46/100
Worthplaying.com	7.8/10

Atlantis Underwater Tycoon has been praised for its well-done visuals and its snappy underwater music track. The ability to see into buildings and view the people within nightclubs and movie theaters is also a nice plus. The visual depiction of night and day from the rays of light shining down on the city also provides for a nice ambiance effect. The top moments in the game can be attributed to the times when a player's prospering city "[comes] under attack from enemy subs, and the player reacts to mount a counter-attack to avoid all the player's hard work from being obliterated."

One reviewer says that the game's biggest weakness lay in its lack of variety in building models and resources.

== See also ==
- Deep Sea Tycoon
