= Four Eyes! =

- Genre: Comedy
- Created by: Darryl Kluskowski
- Written by: Madellaine Paxson
- Directed by: Patrick Claeys
- Voices of: Jules de Jongh; Eric Myers; Lizzie Waterworth; Regina Candler; Joanna Ruiz; Tom Clarke Hill
- Theme music composer: Stéphane Meer
- Opening theme: "Four Eyes!"
- Composer: Stéphane Meer
- Countries of origin: United States; France; Ireland
- Original language: English
- No. of seasons: 2
- No. of episodes: 25 (50 segments)

Production
- Executive producers: Gilbert Hus; William T. Baumann; Bruce D. Johnson; Fred Schaefer; Philippe Lenget; Paul Cummins
- Producer: Siobhán Ní Ghadhra
- Running time: 22 minutes
- Production companies: PorchLight Entertainment; Pictor Media; Telegael Teoranta

Original release
- Network: MyFamilyTV (United States); France 3 (France); TG4 (Ireland); CITV (United Kingdom)
- Release: January 2, 2006

Four Eyes! is an animated television series created by Darryl Kluskowski and co-produced by PorchLight Entertainment, Pictor Media and Telegael Teoranta for France 3.

== Plot summary ==
The series centers around a misanthropic alien girl called Emma, who is sent to planet Earth by her parents to repeat the fifth grade.

== Characters ==
- Emma (voiced by Jules de Jongh) is a redheaded 11-year-old girl from the planet Albacore 7. She was sent to the Payne Academy boarding school by her parents, after flunking the fifth grade back home. Usually, squid-like in appearance, Emma uses a device shaped like a pair of glasses to alter her appearance into a human form. She has a plethora of alien abilities, including multiple psychic powers, the ability to fire a matter-disintegration beam from her fingers, being able to hold her breath for a long time, and many others. In human form, Emma has the physical appearance of a geek's trope; she has buck teeth and wears glasses. She is unable to be in contact with dairy products, as they cause her disguise to malfunction.
- Skyler (voiced by Eric Myers) and Pete (voiced by Lizzie Waterworth) are Emma's best friends. They are the only ones who know her secret. While they are both quintessential "nerds", Pete has a tendency to be very panicky and over-dramatic, while Skyler tends to put most of his focus on logic and order. Like Emma, they both wear glasses and have at least one snaggletooth. Pete has a crush on another girl named Isabelle. Despite their apparent friendship, the two often argue with Emma and most of the time they do not get along.
- Alexis and Roland Billingsford (voiced by Lizzie Waterworth and Regina Candler) are the school's spoiled brats. They act superior to everyone else. While both of them dislike Emma, Alexis especially dislikes her, going out of her way to cause her trouble. Despite the fact that Roland is later shown to be seemingly not as bad as his twin sister, who influences him and his decisions, he still bullies Emma and appears to be the brawn of the duo.
- Miss Dowager (voiced by Joanna Ruiz) is the strict teacher at Payne Academy. She lavishes acclaim on the Billingsford twins, whilst looking for any excuse to send Emma and her friends to detention. It is later revealed that the reason she dislikes Emma so much is due to her last boyfriend left her for a woman with the same name.
- Isabelle is the cutest girl who is a student at Payne Academy. Pete has a crush on her.
- Coach Stebbins (voiced by Tom Clarke Hill) is the students' gym teacher. A former officer in the army, he sees no difference between the students and his ex-platoon, treating them like grunts and calling them "privates".
- Headmaster Payne (voiced by Eric Myers) is the headmaster of Payne Academy. An easy-going, good-natured man, he prefers not to punish his students unless necessary, and often tries to "connect" with his youngest charges, however most of the time he does not even irritate understanding their issues and hardly ever attempts to help Emma with her concerns. In "Plasmic Psycho-Alienanalysis", he, thanks to Emma, gets the characteristics of a cat. In one episode, Emma actually impersonated him by speaking with a male voice into the PA and actually doing a good job.
- Rutger (voiced by Joanna Ruiz) is the MVP of the Withering Vine school's soccer team. Emma has a crush on him. They have both come into contact before, and Rutger has shown to be nice to Emma, however, he is also depicted as disloyal and manipulative; for example, in one episode, he attempts to use Skyler's skills in a science project. In another episode, he began dating a girl from his own school, causing Emma to become extremely jealous which caused her to act psychotic and more like ancient Albacoridians. At the end of the show Rutger appears to be aware of Emma's crush, but does not pursue it whatsoever; Emma distances herself from it as well, implying the crush was not permanent.
- Emma's Parents (voiced by Regina Candler and Tom Clarke Hill) are Emma's parents. Although living on Albacore 7, they often talk with Emma through a communication device disguised as a lava lamp. They are portrayed as both strict and demanding, but also neglecting and unfair, punishing their hundreds of kids and clearly favorizing some in favor of others. Emma always looks for their approval, to no avail.

== Episode list ==
=== Season 1 ===
1. Who's Who? / So Dreamy
2. The Test / Bad Hair Day
3. Goal Oriented / They Are Among Us
4. Zoo-Illogical / Miss Dowager's Secret
5. Science Friction / Parents From Space
6. The Fifth Emma / Cold Hearted
7. Lost Connection / Pete and Re-Pete
8. Headmaster Emma / Making Plans for Pete
9. Miss Academy Mishap / Falling Star
10. Miss Pop Hilarity / Plasmic Psycho-Alienanalysis
11. Cheaters Never Win / No Payne, No Gain!
12. Frog Day Afternoon / The Last Judgment
13. Gone to the Dogs / Roomies

=== Season 2 ===
1. The Pool / Who Needs You?
2. Alter Ego / Less Humanity Please!
3. Til' Debt Do Us Part / The Unknown Comic
4. Homesick is Where the Heart Is / Mad About You
5. Desperately Seeking Skyler / Love is For Dummies
6. Venus de Pete / The Loch Ness Emma
7. Back to Nature / Spoiled Milk
8. Big Bang Boom / Two Faced Emma
9. The Milk Man / Radio Free Earth
10. Fish Feud / Ben and Julie
11. Monkey See, Monkey Do / Mother's Day
12. Green Four Eyed Monster / Mission Chimpossible
