= Skunk Fu! =

Animated television series

- Genre: Comedy; Action; Fantasy; Slapstick
- Created by: Aidan Harte
- Voices of: Jules de Jongh; Paul Tylak; Tony Acworth; Patricia Rodriguez; Rod Goodall; Paul McLoone
- Countries of origin: Ireland; United Kingdom
- No. of series: 1
- No. of episodes: 26 (52 segments)

Production
- Executive producers: Paul Cummins; Tom van Wavaren; Paul Young
- Producer: Jordan Gaucher
- Running time: 24 minutes (2 12–minute segments)
- Production companies: International Rheingold Productions; Cartoon Saloon; Telegael; Hoek, Line & Thinker; Cake Entertainment

Original release
- Network: BBC One/CBBC (United Kingdom); TG4/RTÉ One (Ireland)
- Release: 15 September 2007 – 22 March 2008

Skunk Fu! is an animated action adventure fantasy comedy television series featuring the fables and adventures of anthropomorphic animals protecting their Valley using martial arts. The show chronicles the adventures of young Skunk, training with his Kung Fu master, Panda, with the support of Rabbit, Fox, Turtle, and others, who directly, or inadvertently, also help Skunk grow. The show won the IFTA award for "Best Animation". In addition to an English soundtrack, Irish-language, French-language, Japanese-language, and Dutch-language soundtracks were initially produced.

== Synopsis ==
Skunk and the other Valley animals led by Panda thwart Dragon's efforts to overtake their Valley with Baboon and the Ninja Monkeys from their lair in the Mountains. Historically Dragon and Panda were friends, but since Dragon was punished by Heaven for his arrogance, he perceives the Valley residents as the reason for his downfall and seeks to destroy them. Panda sees Skunk as crucial to saving the Valley and endeavors to teach Skunk who often tries to circumvent laborious Kung Fu training, only to learn the value of the initial lesson from the consequences of his actions with Skunk ultimately saving the day, usually by himself or with the help of his friends.

== Characters ==
=== Valley Animals ===
- Skunk (voiced by Jules de Jongh) is a 10-year-old black and white striped skunk with large red nose and is the main protagonist of the series. He is the youngest of the Valley dwellers and wants to be a Kung Fu master, but he has to learn his Kung Fu moves with Panda first. Despite being underestimated often (even by his friends) he manages to save the day many times.
- Master Panda (voiced by Paul Tylak) is a giant panda who is the wise 80-year-old leader of the Valley and Skunk's master.
- Rabbit (voiced by Paul Tylak) is an egocentric gray and white hare with a small purple nose who often clashes with Skunk and Panda. He is always ready to fight and has a crush on Fox.
- Fox (voiced by Patricia Rodriguez) is a beautiful red fox who is an effective, graceful fighter and Skunk's best friend. Her favorite weapon is her fan, and she is a graceful, respected warrior of the Valley.
- Pig (voiced by Tony Acworth) is a dim-witted wild boar who loves playing in mud and is unfailingly loyal.
- Ox and Bird (both voiced by Tony Acworth) are a duo. Bird is an orange oxpecker and Ox is a large blue water buffalo. They are the most lazy characters but can be helpful at times, especially with Ox's ability to see invisible enemies.
- Dr. Turtle (voiced by Tony Acworth) is a tan-colored tortoise with a purple shell. He often wears a hat and can fight with his walking stick.
- Ms. Duck (voiced by Jules de Jongh) is an elderly blue duck. She is a chef and good friend with Panda.
- Tiger (voiced by Rod Goodall) is a white tiger and cowardly friend of Panda's. He is usually afraid of Ninja Monkeys but was able to fight them on some ocassions.
- Frog (voiced by Tony Acworth) is a silly green frog who shares a cheerful, happy-go-lucky personality with Skunk.
- Snake (voiced by Paul Tylak) is a purplish-blue Australian-accented king cobra who enjoys inflicting pain.
- Killer Bees (both voiced by Tony Acworth) are a swarm of bees who tend to be extremely short-tempered and will attack anyone who angers them, regardless of whether they are friends or not.
- Crane (voiced by Jules de Jongh) is a tall, white demoiselle crane who is the general town gossip, often mistaken for a heron.
- Mantis (voiced by Tony Acworth) is a green Chinese mantis who is the Valley's lookout bug. When he speaks, he makes brief pauses every few words. He seems to be a masochist constantly looking to put himself in harm's way in hopes of a tragic outcome, even expressing disappointment when a battle is going favorably. Despite his desire to see himself harmed, he is noted to put up an honest fight.
- Mr. Fish (voiced by Tony Acworth) is a large black and white fish in control, with feelings for Ms. Duck.
- Blinky is a glowing firefly who was Skunk's friend and his pet in the past, though the fireflies view it as Skunk being his pet. Unlike other fireflies, he can't speak in human voice.

=== Villains ===
- Dragon (voiced by Rod Goodall) is a large black Chinese dragon and is the main antagonist of the series. He was once best friends with Master Panda when they were children, and was a beautiful golden color, but unfortunately, his friendship with Panda ended when the Heavens banished him into his icy prison due to his arrogance. As a result of being trapped in his icy prison, his once beautiful golden scales withered into a deep black color, and he grew bitter and vengeful. He is the superior of Baboon and his Ninja Monkey henchmen.
- Baboon (voiced by Paul McLoone) is a white baboon and is the second main antagonist of the series. With his army of Ninja Monkeys by his side, he'll stop at nothing to find ways of destroying the Valley.
- Ninja Monkeys (all voiced by Tony Acworth) are black and white monkeys who are Baboon's minions. Despite using various dirty tricks, they can never defeat Panda and his friends.

== Episodes ==
No.	Title	Script by	Storyboard by	Original US air date	Prod. code
1	"The Art of Stickiness"	Cate Lieuwen	Jez Hall	15 September 2007	101A
Rabbit leads a mission to capture some Ninja Monkeys using traps made of sticky tree sap, but Skunk and his friends can't resist playing with the stuff. They get so sticky that they're barely able to fight off the attacking Ninja Monkeys. Before long, both the animals and the Ninja Monkeys are stuck together in huge, dueling sap balls. However, when Baboon gets caught in the huge sap ball, having been searching for the monkeys, Skunk and his friends find themselves in huge trouble as they battle to stop Baboon and the Ninja Monkeys.
2	"The Art of Rivalry"	Greg Grabianski	Marco Piersma	15 September 2007	101B
After Baboon's Ninja Monkeys manage to fail to invade the Valley yet again much to Baboon's own personal dismay and frustration, Rabbit, fed up with Panda's teachings which demonstrate patience, decides to starts his own Kung Fu school with cool-colored belts, and Skunk is faced with a choice: stick with Panda or go to Rabbit's school. He ends up going to both schools as a student, and everything is fine until a tournament pits the best students from each school against each other, and now Skunk has to fight himself.
3	"The Art of Leaving Them Laughing"	Adam J.B. Lane	Rasmus Norgaard and Alessandra Sorrentino	22 September 2007	102A
Impressed by Dr. Turtle's humorous bedside manner, Skunk resolves to become a comedian. His comedic styling comes in handy when he tags along with Fox and Rabbit on a special mission.
4	"The Art of Monkey Launching"	Greg Grabianski and Aimee Keillor	Alessandra Sorrentino	22 September 2007	102B
While Panda and most of the inhabitants of the Valley are away, examining a catapult that Baboon and the Ninja Monkeys have assembled, Skunk, Bird, and Ox are hanging around, guarding the Valley but things change when the Ninja Monkeys launch an attack.
5	"The Art of Attitude"	Thomas Krajewski	Jez Hall	29 September 2007	103A
Rabbit teaches Skunk how to sound tough, which leads to a muscle flexing contest with Baboon.
6	"The Art of Revenge"	Aimee Keillor and Greg Grabianski	Christian Garland	29 September 2007	103B
When Skunk's Green Tea Cake is stomped on by a Ninja Monkey, Skunk embarks on a quest of revenge with his shoulder devil and shoulder angel assisting Skunk while the shoulder angel also trying to stop Skunk from exacting his revenge against the Ninja Monkey responsible. However, when poor Skunk gets captured by Baboon, it's up to him to find a way to escape.
7	"The Art of Tunneling"	Scott Sonneborn	Marco Piersma	6 October 2007	104A
Digging a tunnel to Dragon's lair (with the help of Rabbit) seems like it'd be tons of fun for Skunk. However, he quickly founds out that this is not the case because Rabbit is extremely bossy.
8	"The Art of Conkering"	Greg Grabianski	Christian Garland	6 October 2007	104B
Skunk and Tiger venture into Dragon's territory so they can find an extremely hard walnut so that they can beat Pig at a game of Chinese Conkers.
9	"The Art of No Mind"	Scott Sonneborn	Rasmus Norgaard	13 October 2007	105A
Ninja Monkeys attack the Valley and they appear to be invisible to all except Ox. When Ox and Skunk save the day, however, Ox loses his ability to see them.
10	"The Art of Kung Fruit"	Andy Rheingold and Amy Jackson; Story by : Pamela Hickey and Dennys McCoy	Marco Piersma	13 October 2007	105B
In exchange for a break from Panda's grueling training, Skunk journeys to The Hill of Moons deep in Dragon's territory to retrieve some of his master's favorite plums. Fox, Rabbit, and Tiger worry about Skunk, and they decide to follow him. Skunk soon finds himself fighting for his life when he's ambushed by Baboon and the Ninja Monkeys.
11	"The Art of Darkness"	Josh Cagan	Alessandra Sorrentino	20 October 2007	106A
Skunk would like nothing more than to join Rabbit on night patrol, and Rabbit would like nothing more than to be left alone, so he scares the daylights out of Skunk with a story about a phantom Rooster who haunts the forest. To exact revenge Skunk and Tiger make a Rooster costume and in turn scare Rabbit from his post. But now with no one on patrol, it is up to Skunk defend the Valley.
12	"The Art of Dream Control"	Brandon Auman	Christian Garland	20 October 2007	106B
When Skunk has nightmares of being controlled by Dragon and the Ninja Monkeys, Skunk and Panda must enter the dream realm to stop them.
13	"The Art of Responsibility"	Scott Sonneborn	Chris Drew	27 October 2007	107A
Skunk quickly makes friends with a firefly and ask Panda if he can keep him as a pet.
14	"The Art of Stealing"	Greg Grabianski	Christian Garland	27 October 2007	107B
Skunk wants to use Dragon's stolen magic jewel to help the Valley animals. However, Dragon has different plans.
15	"The Art of Brainwashing"	Scott Sonneborn	Christian Garland	3 November 2007	108A
After Pig has fallen into the enemy's hands and is suffering from amnesia, Pig thinks he is a Ninja Monkey. Skunk, Rabbit, and Praying Mantis must now find a way to return Pig to normal.
16	"The Art of Turtle Watching"	Dave Bourla	Alessandra Sorrentino	3 November 2007	108B
Skunk is forced to watch Turtle on a snow day. This is easier said than done, however, because Baboon and his Ninja Monkeys decide to steal Turtle's shell.
17	"The Art of Truffling"	Amy Jackson, Andy Rheingold, Pamela Hickey and Dennys McCoy	Jez Hall	10 November 2007	109A
Truffles are in season, and their aroma transforms Pig into a truffle-seeking Mr. Hyde maniac. But Dragon wants the truffles for himself, in order to make a scale-soothing lotion that would set him free from his icy cave. Skunk and Rabbit attempt to protect Pig and his truffles from Dragon's henchman.
18	"The Art of Patience"	Rob Sosin	Christian Garland	10 November 2007	109B
When Panda tests Skunk with the "box in paw" trick (Skunk has to snatch a pebble out of Panda's paw before he closes it), Skunk gets frustrated and storms off, almost walking into a net trap laid by Baboon and his goons. Unfortunately, Fox is caught but she doesn't lose her cool. In facing down Baboon, she teaches Skunk that sometimes patience and cunning can be much more effective than speed and strength.
19	"The Art of Being a Pebble"	Adam J.B. Lane	Jez Hall	17 November 2007	110A
Wanting Skunk to quiet down so he can get some sleep, Panda trains Skunk in a completely fictitious and very silent technique of transferring one's chi into a rock. But when the Ninja Monkey's swipe the rock that Panda just transferred his chi to, Skunk and Tiger hunt the chimps down to save Panda.
20	"The Art of Passing the Buck"	Scott Sonneborn	Christian Garland and Rasmus Norgaard	17 November 2007	110B
When Skunk accidentally breaks an ancient lantern that has hung in the Valley for hundreds of years, he blames it on the Ninja Monkeys. And he gets off scot-free. But soon everyone starts blaming the Ninja Monkeys for everything! And then no one seems particularly concerned when Skunk tries to warn them of a real monkey invasion.
21	"The Art of Giggling"	Greg Grabianski and Aimee Keillor	Pascal Campion and Rasmus Norgaard	24 November 2007	111A
Skunk can't stop his constant giggle fits. Can Master Frog help?
22	"The Art of Getting Stuck"	Greg Grabianski	Jakob Foged	24 November 2007	111B
Skunk somehow manages to get Rabbit's Ninja Monkey workout dummy mask stuck to his own face. Before he can eep "no", Skunk is swooped up into a Ninja Monkey unit and is face-to-face with Dragon himself.
23	"The Art of the Touch"	Scott Sonneborn	Marco Piersma	1 December 2007	112A
Skunk spies Panda practicing a legendary Kung Fu move that freezes one's opponent called the Divine Hand. Of course, Skunk uses the move to prank everyone in the Valley. But the joke is on him when the Ninja Monkeys watch Skunk showing the move to Rabbit. Now Skunk and Rabbit have to freeze all the Ninja Monkeys before they can pass on the secret technique to Baboon.
24	"The Art of Hospitality"	Amy Jackson, Andy Rheingold, Pamela Hickey and Dennys McCoy	Christian Garland	1 December 2007	112B
When Ninja Monkeys have entered Rabbit's borrow, Skunk invites Rabbit to stay with him and Panda. But soon he becomes a total pest.
25	"The Art of Luck"	Greg Grabianski	Erik Verkerk	8 December 2007	113A
Dragon gives Baboon the power to use the "Jinx's Palm": a one-shot deal where whoever is struck with his blow is saddled with horrible bad luck. His target: Panda. But when he strikes Skunk instead, Skunk finds a way to use his terrible luck to his advantage by wreaking havoc on the Ninja Monkeys. Baboon then tries to stop him by using the "Fortunate Palm", a good luck remedy, in an epic clash of good and bad luck, pitting Skunk and Baboon against each other in a battle where luck will decide who the ultimate victor is.
26	"The Art of Endurance"	Greg Grabianski	Leo Ito	8 December 2007	113B
As endurance training, Panda has Skunk place an egg between his legs and hold it there – without breaking it – until Panda returns and says it's okay. Problem is, Panda is quietly kidnapped by the Ninja Monkeys. Skunk is determined to pass the test and hang onto the already rotten egg, which makes the rescue mission all the more difficult.
27	"The Art of Lightning"	Gabe Pulliam	Rasmus Norgaard and Jakob Foged	15 December 2007	114A
After checking out a piece of Baboon's fur (which Rabbit got from his most recent encounter), Skunk and Rabbit find the secret to a forgotten fighting move known as "The Lighting Claw" but the two find themselves in a whole heap of trouble when Baboon gains access to the move.
28	"The Art of the Double Cross"	Andy Rheingold and Amy Jackson; Story by : Pamela Hickey and Dennys McCoy	Christian Garland	15 December 2007	114B
The kindhearted Skunk takes in a Ninja Monkey who was kicked out of Baboon's army. But Panda thinks that that monkey is a spy. Skunk figures out that the Monkey is not telling the truth and tricks him into telling Baboon that they are planning a massive attack.
29	"The Art of Nose Blow"	Holly Huckins	Ugren Radushev	5 January 2008	115A
After Baboon gets banished by Dragon for an embarrassing defeat, Snake starts a rumor that Skunk invented a powerful new move.
30	"The Art of the Crush"	Cate Lieuwen	Ugren Radushev	5 January 2008	115B
Rabbit convinces Skunk to go with him on a "dangerous mission" but truthfully, he just wants to retrieve stolen poems he wrote about Fox which soon becomes intense when Baboon and the Ninja Monkeys arrive.
31	"The Art of Small Victories"	Scott Sonneborn	Erik Verkerk and Jakob Foged	12 January 2008	116A
Skunk is too embarrassed to admit that he plays with ants. However, it turns out to be very useful when Baboon attacks the Valley with an army of red ants.
32	"The Art of Influence"	Greg Grabianski	Leo Ito	12 January 2008	116B
The Ninja Monkeys accidentally shrink Baboon using a powerful new potion and Baboon takes full advantage of the situation by pretending to be Skunk's "inner voice", causing Skunk to rebel and go against his friends.
33	"The Art of Kiting"	Scott Sonneborn	Marco Piersma	19 January 2008	117A
Skunk wants to help Turtle with his New Year's kite display. But soon, he thinks it's a good idea to infiltrate Baboon's great wall.
34	"The Art of Being Lazy"	Greg Grabianski	Marco Piersma	19 January 2008	117B
Skunk pretends to be sick so he can get out of doing Panda's chores. However, he soon feels guilty when all his friends go into one of the big battles.
35	"The Art of the Stink"	Greg Grabianski	Erik Verkerk and Jakob Foged	26 January 2008	118A
Realizing how powerful Skunk's stink is, Rabbit makes a task force to collect it and use it as a weapon.
36	"The Art of the Fan Fan"	Scott Sonneborn	Marco Piersma	26 January 2008	118B
When Panda hears that Baboon's making a bigger army, he has the women of the Valley (Duck, Crane and Fox) train Skunk in the art of fan fighting. Skunk thinks it's cool at first but Rabbit and Pig soon tease him for the "girly" style of fighting.
37	"The Art of the Dizzy Master"	Andy Rheingold	Erik Verkerk	2 February 2008	119A
Skunk invents a new move, The Dizzy Master, making enemies unable to hit him. Such a discovery makes him believe he is unstoppable so he and Pig go off to steal Dragon's beard in order to prove it.
38	"The Art of Dim Sum Fu"	Cate Lieuwen	Erik Verkerk	2 February 2008	119B
Panda makes Skunk take cooking lessons from Duck but as soon as he masters it, the Ninja Monkeys have taken an extreme liking to their cooking so much that they've become too blotted to do much of anything, much to Baboon's disgust and annoyance.
39	"The Art of Strategy"	Greg Grabianski	Ugren Radushev	9 February 2008	120A
When Baboon uses his new cannon to attack the Valley, Rabbit ignores Panda's orders for a defensive plan to make an even bigger weapon.
40	"The Art of Being Heavy"	Cate Lieuwen	Rasmus Norgaard	9 February 2008	120B
Panda tries to teach Skunk a skill that would make him heavier. But when Skunk struggles learning it, he uses a giant boulder in its place.
41	"The Art of Wushu"	Eric Shaw	Rasmus Norgaard	16 February 2008	121A
Baboon challenges the Valley animals in a gaming event, but it becomes serious when Skunk unintentionally wagers the Valley.
42	"The Art of the Tea Ceremony"	Greg Grabianski and Aimee Keillor	Jakob Foged	16 February 2008	121B
Skunk, Pig, Ox, and Bird try to mimic the elders' tea ceremony, believing that it gives them powerful skills.
43	"The Art of Initiation"	Scott Sonneborn	Erik Verkerk	23 February 2008	122A
Skunk and Pig are informed by Tiger, Snake, and Fish about an initiation chamber that makes one become a true warrior. All three claim they have already succeeded in doing this, but eventually they reveal to each other that neither of them completed the initiation.
44	"The Art of Art"	Thomas Krajewski	Rasmus Norgaard	23 February 2008	122B
Panda tries to teach Skunk art, but he fails at every form. But when Skunk learns that getting beaten up by Ninja Monkeys turns his abstract sculptures into beautiful and realistic works of art, he takes full advantage.
45	"The Art of Monkeying Around"	Scott Sonneborn	Jakob Foged	1 March 2008	123A
After another plan of Baboon's goes horribly wrong, he blames it on the Ninja Monkeys and fires them, going to great lengths to eject them from the area. They start to move into the Valley and take up Skunk, Bird, and Ox's private spots. Now they have to make it look like they were defeated by the monkeys, so Baboon can take them back but with Rabbit insisting on fighting the Ninja Monkeys as a means of strengthening himself, it might be not an easy task for Skunk, Bird, and Ox to accomplish.
46	"The Art of Sneaking"	Cate Lieuwen	Leo Ito	1 March 2008	123B
When Turtle's notebook is stolen by the Ninja Monkeys, Snake goes on a special mission to get it back. Wanting to prove that he can be a good spy, Skunk invites himself to join Snake.
47	"The Art of Seeing Blind"	Greg Grabianski	Christian Garland	8 March 2008	124A
Panda teaches Skunk to see without seeing, which Skunk finds silly. But when he gets lost in a tunnel made by the Ninja Monkeys, Skunk has all-new respect for sound.
48	"The Art of Monkey Love"	Greg Grabianski; Story by : David Stone, Erik Verkerk and Joost van den Bosch	Jez Hall	8 March 2008	124B
Baboon disguises one of the Ninja Monkeys as a female skunk in order to capture Skunk for Dragon's birthday. But Skunk "saves" the decoy, and takes her to the Valley. Skunk is happy to meet another of his kind, but all his friends keep getting in the way of his romance.
49	"The Art of No Lung Fu"	Cate Lieuwen	Jez Hall	15 March 2008	125A
Panda has Skunk learn underwater combat from Fish. It's a good thing too, because Baboon has built a dam in the river causing a drought.
50	"The Art of Destiny Swapping"	Adam J.B. Lane	Jez Hall	15 March 2008	125B
Tired of all the chores that come with his "destiny", Skunk makes a deal with Mantis to trade lives. But he soon becomes bored and all the missions Mantis is now tackling all end up going horribly wrong.
51	"The Art of Remembering"	Adam J.B. Lane	Christian Garland and Rasmus Norgaard	22 March 2008	126A
52	"The Art of Remembering"	Adam J.B. Lane	Rasmus Norgaard and Joost van den Bosch	22 March 2008	126B
Part I: Rabbit, Fox, and Skunk alert Duck that Panda has been captured by Baboon. Rabbit tells the story from his point of view. Part II: Fox recounts the story of Panda's capture from her point of view, but when she fails to explain it in a manner Duck can understand, all hope lies in Skunk's side of the story. Note: This is the series finale.

== Production and broadcast ==
Skunk Fu! was produced by Cartoon Saloon and premiered on 28 May 2007 on ABC Australia. The series was broadcast in Ireland and the United Kingdom on 9 July 2007 on CBBC. Wu-Tang Clan member Ghostface Killah performed the theme song.

The series was shown on ABC Rollercoaster in Australia and BBC and S4C in the UK (under the Welsh title, Drewgi). TG4 broadcast Skunk Fu! in Irish. The series made its debut in the United States on the Kids' WB! block on The CW on 15 September 2007, and then premiered a year later on Cartoon Network in 2008. The series also aired on YTV in Canada and ANN in Japan.

A feature film based on the series was planned, but was quietly cancelled.

== Home media ==
In region one from 23 November 2008 to 12 May 2009, NCircle Entertainment have only released three DVD volumes for the series, totaling eighteen segment-episodes.

Title	Episode count	Release date
Title	Episode count	Region 1
The Art of Rivalry	6	23 November 2008
Contained "The Art of Rivalry", "The Art of Tunneling", "The Art of Turtle Watching", "The Art of Being a Pebble", "The Art of Influence" and "The Art of Strategy".
The Art of Monkey Launching	6	23 December 2008
Contained "The Art of Monkey Launching", "The Art of Revenge", "The Art of Patience", "The Art of Initiation", "The Art of Art" and "The Art of Sneaking".
The Art of Kung Fruit	6	12 May 2009
Contained "The Art of Kung Fruit", "The Art of Responsibility", "The Art of Stealing", "The Art of Dim Sum Fu", "The Art of Wushu" and "The Art of the Tea Ceremony".

== See also ==
- Cartoon Saloon
- Yin Yang Yo! - similar in content
