= Faith Connors =

- Mirror's Edge character
- Faith as she appears in Mirror's Edge
- First appearance: Mirror's Edge (2008)
- Voiced by: Jules de Jongh (Mirror's Edge, 2D and mobile); Faye Kingslee (Catalyst)

In-universe information
- Full name: Faith Connors
- Alias: Phoenix Carpenter
- Occupation: Revolutionary; parkourist
- Fighting style: Melee

Faith Connors, also known by her alias Phoenix Carpenter, is a fictional character and the protagonist of the 2008 action video game Mirror's Edge. Presented in the game as a "Runner", Faith transports items for revolutionary groups hiding from the totalitarian government. In addition to the game, Faith also starred in its comic tie-in, and appears in the game's reboot, Mirror's Edge Catalyst.

Her voice is provided by Jules de Jongh in Mirror's Edge with her voice clips being re-used in the side-games Mirror's Edge 2D and Mirror's Edge (mobile). Faye Kingslee voices Faith in the main game reboot Mirror's Edge Catalyst. Developers placed the game in a first-person perspective partly to connect the player with the character. Faith's design was intended to appeal to both males and females, and balanced her edgy attitude with the game's clean, minimalist aesthetic.

The character received mostly positive reception, with much attention being given to her character design. She has been featured in many "top character" lists, and is well-received as a female character. However, some criticized her for some aspects such as her perceived lack of personality.

== Character overview ==
Faith earns her living as a "Runner", a courier who carries physical communiqués around the city, her services retained by revolutionary groups who avoid communicating via highly monitored telephone and e-mail channels. Her face has a distinctive tattoo around her right eye, imitated by the game's logo. Faith's attitude towards the totalitarian government is rooted in her past; her parents were active in protest movements when she was young, campaigning to keep the city from shifting to the oppressive regime. Her mother was killed during the "November riots"—peaceful protests gone wrong—and Faith ran away from home when she was 16, living a thief's life on the city streets. Faith became a Runner after meeting Mercury (or Merc), a former Runner who now trains new hires, sources jobs for them, and provides them with intelligence and radio support while on the job.

Faith is usually seen wearing a black tank top with white stripes down the side, showing her arms and her tattoo. On her arm, she wears a black sweatband to cover her elbow and a red glove to symbolise herself. In Mirror's Edge Catalyst, her glove is red and black. She has short, straight black hair at around chin length; in Mirror's Edge Catalyst it is stylized so that it is longer in the front than the back. She wears white cargo pants with several large rubber bands above her pants on her calves and single-toed red running shoes without socks.

== Creation and development ==
Before the developers made her the protagonist of the game, Faith was initially conceived as simply another "member of the gang". Jules de Jongh voices Faith in the game.

"It was important to us that she felt human not superhuman, inspirational not unattainable, a real hero."

— "Creating Character: Ten Faces We Won't Soon Forget"

The character was designed to appeal to both women and men. Avoiding the cliché of "muscle freak" males and "well endowed" females, Faith was intended to be a "more grown-up, minimalist, and fashion orientated character". The developers wanted her to be, whilst attractive, not a "supermodel" and instead "approachable and far more real". Her appearance also reflected her own athleticism. Her bright red shoes and glove, as well as her tattooed body, is intended to demonstrate her "edgy" attitude. It was important, however, that the design conform to the game's clean, minimalist aesthetic.

Developers decided to set the game in first-person in order to connect the player to Faith rather than simply watching her, as well as to add the feel of "being in an action movie, instead of playing it". As a result, Faith's model is largely unseen in-game apart from in reflections, while cutscenes instead present her in a 2-D animated style. Producer Nick Channon felt this added a sense of "mystique" and helped make Mirror's Edge unique. Before the reflections were introduced, another producer John Riccitiello spoke out against the first-person perspective as he wished to be able to see Faith in-game, hence leading to their creation.

"Creating Faith for a new generation", her redesign in the reboot game Mirror's Edge: Catalyst

When redesigning Faith for the second game, developers began with her colour scheme: "the white, the red, the blacks". Her glove was kept, with the designers considering it an iconic part of her character. Once again, the design had to be "elegant, minimalistic", with "a certain attitude". The colours used for accenting were very deliberately placed. Her design had to reflect her own strength. In the upcoming game, they hoped to explore more of Faith's motives, noting how she tattooed her eye to make a point.

== Appearances ==
=== Mirror's Edge games ===
Faith made her debut appearance in 2008's Mirror's Edge. Throughout the game, she is guided via a comm unit by a man codenamed Merc. After delivering a package to Celeste, another Runner, Faith hears that her sister Kate, who is a cop, could be in trouble and rushes to find her, Faith finds Kate standing over the body of Robert Pope, a candidate for mayor. Kate refuses to leave with Faith and is arrested, while Faith finds a note saying "Icarus" in Pope's hand. She learns that Travis "Ropeburn" Burfield, Pope's head of security, may be involved with his murder from Jacknife, a former Runner. After meeting with Kate's superior officer, Lieutenant Miller, Faith heads to a meeting Ropeburn as scheduled, where he discovers her. Faith manages to win the fight by knocking him off the roof, and interrogates him as he hangs there. Before Ropeburn can give any vital information, he is shot by an unknown assassin and falls to his death. She investigates the security firm helping the police force fight the Runners and discovers their work on Project Icarus, a program designed to train their forces in parkour style to oppose the Runners. Faith finds Ropeburn's assassin and discovers she is actually Celeste, helping Icarus in order to ensure her own safety.

Faith ambushes the police convoy carrying the now convicted Kate to rescue her. She gives Kate her comms unit so that Merc may guide her to the hideout while she distracts the police. When Faith returns to the hideout, she finds Merc dying and Kate recaptured. As he dies, Merc tells Faith that Kate is at the Shard, the place containing the servers running the city's surveillance systems. With Miller's help, Faith destroys these servers and reaches the building's roof, finding Kate held by Jacknife, who is part of Project Icarus and has been using Faith to discover loose ends. Jacknife tries to leave with Kate via a helicopter, though Faith jumps and kicks him out the helicopter causing it to crash and him to fall to his death. The end credits reveal that though still wanted Faith and Kate have escaped, and that Project Icarus has only accelerated as a result. The character also appears in 2010's Mirror's Edge for mobile devices, which is a prequel to the original game.

The character stars in 2016's Mirror's Edge Catalyst, a reboot that explores her origins.

=== Other games ===
Faith was revealed as a cameo appearance in MySims SkyHeroes, though ultimately does not appear in the game itself. She similarly made a cameo appearance in MySims Agents as a trophy, and as an EA Play exclusive weapon charm in Apex Legends. She is featured as a playable character in EA Sports's 2011 NBA Jam: On Fire Edition.

=== Other media ===
Mirror's Edge's release was accompanied by a six-issue comic series of the same title. It was published by imprint WildStorm as part of a partnership between EA and DC Comics. Set before the events of the game, Faith stars as the main character.

The game's writer Rhianna Pratchett wrote a six-page mini comic as a trial submission which was released at Comic-Con 2008. This was successful and she was hired to work on the comic by WildStorm. The comic series allowed Pratchett to examine the characters and world of Mirror's Edge in greater depth than had been possible in the game.

== Reception ==
Faith received a positive reception. GamesRadar awarded her place #96 on their list of best heroes in video games, praising her motives and tattoo. Although Faith ultimately did not make the cut, Game Informer staff considered her inclusion in their "30 characters that defined a decade" collection, with Meagan Marie saying "combined with strength, intelligence, and perseverance, Faith’s tough demeanor in a petite package had her running heads and shoulders above the crowd of cookie cutter female leads". Complex's Drea Avellan put her at #3 in a list of most "badass" game characters.

Prior to the announcement of a sequel, Faith was included on Annette Gonzalez of Game Informer's list of characters they wanted more of. UGO Networks similarly bemoaned her lack of future appearance, noting how "she was built to be athletic rather than sexy" unlike most other female characters. Similarly, Mariusz Koryszewski writing for Polish site GameStar called her one of five female video game character that deserved more recognition, commenting on the game's relative lack of mainstream success.

=== Visual appearance ===
Her visual design drew attention. Prior to the game's release, 1UP.com's Scott Sharkey placed her #4 on his "most attractive, non-sexualized women in games" list, commenting "looking at her makes us wonder what her story is, not how many man hours were spent tweaking her breast physics." After its release, Game Informer listed Faith as one character well-designed to be memorable, praising her practicality, femininity, and "rough and tough demeanor". In Brett Elston of GamesRadar's list of "tasteful game heroines", Faith came #5. Elston commented on how Faith "walks the extremely thin line between tough girl and 'grrrl,'" and how "sometimes in the pursuit of making a strong leading lady, creators go too far. Faith was a case of just-right balance." In addition to their praise in their best heroes list, GamesRadar called her tattoos one of the "sickest" in gaming in an article written by Ashley Reed and Matt Bradford. They praised how they fleshed out the character's history, as well as how they stood in the face of the totalitarian government of the game. Vietnamese daily Thanh Niên ranked her as #20 sexiest female character in 2015.

However, Gamasutra's Andrew Vanden Bossche commented "again, Mirror's Edge seems to step forward only with its visuals: Faith’s character design is far more revolutionary than her personality", calling her personality common among video game heroines and criticising her lack of proper motivation. Kotaku's Brian Ashcraft reported on a Korean fan's redesign of the character, catered to Asian beauty standards. Tom Farrer, the game's producer, found the image "kind of sad", commenting on how Faith was designed to be "real". Ashcraft similarly reported on Japanese comments leveled against her design in the upcoming Mirror's Edge game.

=== As a woman ===
Faith has drawn attention as a female character. GamesRadar's Andy Hartup called her one of 12 most inspirational female characters in games, noting the game's first-person perspective. SFGate listed her as one of the nine greatest video game heroines, comparing the game to Run Lola Run partly as a result of their "driven" protagonists. CNET included her in a list of "video game ladies who rock", noting her sensible pants and shoes. Noting how she bucked many trends for female game characters, Michael Rougeau, writing for Complex, listed her as one of the 50 greatest heroines in video game history. Darren Franich of Entertainment Weekly listed her as one of 15 "kick-ass women in videogames", as similarly did Briana Lawrence of Mania Entertainment on a top 13. GameZebo's Dant Rambo felt the developers succeeded in making the character appealing to both genders without sexualizing her. IGN called her "one of the strongest women in the modern gaming landscape," placing her as #3 in their top list of female gaming heroines. Faith was similarly voted #3 of female gaming characters in 2008 by IGN readers, receiving 14% of the votes.

== See also ==
- Chell (Portal)
- Jade (Beyond Good & Evil)
- List of female action heroes
