= Still Alive: The Remixes =

Remix album by Lisa Miskovsky
- Released: 11 November 2008
- Genre: Various
- Length: 37:00 (Standard release); 58:26 (North American release)
- Label: Artwerk
- Producer: Arnthor Birgisson, Rami Yacoub

Lisa Miskovsky chronology
Changes (2006)	Still Alive: The Remixes (2008)

Professional ratings
Review scores
Source	Rating
IGN	7.2/10

Still Alive: The Remixes is a remix album comprising different versions of the song "Still Alive" by Swedish pop rock singer Lisa Miskovsky. It was released by Artwerk on 11 November 2008 to coincide with the North American release date of Mirror's Edge, an action-adventure video game developed by EA Digital Illusions CE (DICE) for which "Still Alive" had been chosen as the main theme.

The instrumental version of the track was used in the mobile game "Mirror's Edge (iOS)". The Teddybears and Paul Van Dyk remixes were used in the flash game "Mirror's Edge 2D".

== Background and writing ==
The song "Still Alive" was recorded exclusively for the video game Mirror's Edge. The music was written and produced by Arnthor Birgisson and Rami Yacoub, who have also written material for artists such as Britney Spears, Shayne Ward and Westlife; Miskovsky wrote the lyrics. The song and several of its remixes have been featured in several previews, first appearing in a teaser trailer released on 6 May 2008. As of November 2008, a music video directed by Matthew Stawski and featuring Miskovsky has been produced for the song in Los Angeles, California.

== Critical reception ==
Still Alive: The Remixes has received some favourable reviews. While reviewing the album for IGN, Spence D. praises several of the remixes, saying that each remixer "has left their own unique stamp on the material, improving it by tweaking it as they saw fit." However, he also points out that "it's the remixes that really score here, taking an otherwise mundane generi-pop track and turning it upside down."

== Chart performance ==
A week after Still Alive: The Remixes was released, the lead track entered the Swedish Singles Chart. It peaked at number 29, and remained in the chart for a total of three weeks.

Chart (2008)	Peak position
Swedish Singles Chart	29
UK Singles Chart	96

== Track listings ==
Three versions of Still Alive: The Remixes have been released, including a promotional release and a North American release containing four additional versions of the lead track. The promotional release is available for critical review via download and is packaged as a bonus disc for the PC version of the game, the other releases are available in various formats including 12" record and CD, and for download from various online retailers including iTunes, eMusic and Amazon. The original version of "Still Alive" was written by Arnthor Birgisson, Rami Yacoub and Lisa Miskovsky, and was produced by Birgisson and Yacoub.

=== Standard release ===
No.	Title	Remixer	Length
1.	"Still Alive (The Theme from Mirror's Edge)" (radio edit)		3:38
2.	"Still Alive" (Benny Benassi mix radio edit)	Benny Benassi	3:42
3.	"Still Alive" (Armand Van Helden mix)	Armand Van Helden	5:25
4.	"Still Alive" (Paul van Dyk mix short version)	Paul van Dyk	6:48
5.	"Still Alive" (Benny Benassi mix)	Benny Benassi	8:26
6.	"Still Alive" (Junkie XL mix)	Junkie XL	4:38
7.	"Still Alive" (Teddybears mix)	Teddybears	4:37
Total length:			37:14

=== North American release ===
No.	Title	Remixer	Length
1.	"Still Alive (The Theme from Mirror's Edge)" (radio edit)		3:38
2.	"Still Alive" (Benny Benassi mix radio edit)	Benny Benassi	3:42
3.	"Still Alive" (Paul van Dyk mix radio edit)	Paul van Dyk	3:39
4.	"Still Alive" (Armand Van Helden mix)	Armand Van Helden	5:25
5.	"Still Alive" (Benny Benassi mix)	Benny Benassi	8:26
6.	"Still Alive" (Junkie XL mix)	Junkie XL	4:38
7.	"Still Alive" (Teddybears mix)	Teddybears	4:37
8.	"Still Alive" (Paul van Dyk mix)	Paul van Dyk	9:34
9.	"Still Alive (The Theme from Mirror's Edge)"		4:18
10.	"Still Alive" (Paul van Dyk mix short version)	Paul van Dyk	6:48
11.	"Still Alive (The Theme from Mirror's Edge)" (US radio edit)		3:41
Total length:			58:26

=== Promotional release ===
No.	Title	Remixer	Length
1.	"Still Alive (The Theme from Mirror's Edge)"		4:20
2.	"Still Alive" (Benny Benassi mix)	Benny Benassi	8:24
3.	"Still Alive" (Junkie XL mix)	Junkie XL	4:37
4.	"Still Alive" (Paul van Dyk mix)	Paul van Dyk	9:36
5.	"Still Alive" (Teddybears mix)	Teddybears	4:38
6.	"Still Alive" (Armand Van Helden mix)	Armand Van Helden	5:25
Total length:			37:00

== Personnel ==
The following people contributed to Still Alive: The Remixes.

- Lisa Miskovsky – vocals
- Arnthor Birgisson – writer, producer
- Rami Yacoub – writer, producer
- Benny Benassi – remix
- Paul van Dyk – remix
- Armand Van Helden – remix
- Junkie XL – remix
- Teddybears – remix
