= Bunny Maloney =

2009 French animated television series

- Genre: Comedy; Action; Animation
- Created by: Nicolaï "Méko" Chauvet; Utku Kaplan; Nicolas Flory
- Directed by: Stéphane Stoll
- Starring: French: Martial Le Minoux; Elisabeth Ventura; Marc Duquesnoy; Corinne Martin; Laurent Pasquier; Vincent Violette; English: Matt Wilkinson; Jules de Jongh; Walter Lewis; Dan Russell; Philippa Alexander; Keith Wickham
- Opening theme: Bunny Maloney theme (performed by Olivia Ruiz and Mathias Malzieu)
- Ending theme: Bunny Maloney theme (instrumental)
- Composers: Fabrice Aboulker; Pascal Stive
- Countries of origin: France; Ireland
- Original language: French
- No. of seasons: 1
- No. of episodes: 52

Production
- Executive producers: Christophe di Sabatino; Benoît di Sabatino; Paul Cummins
- Producer: Maia Tubiana
- Running time: 12 minutes
- Production companies: MoonScoop; Telegael; France 2

Original release
- Network: France Ô (France); Kabillion (United States); Kix (United Kingdom)
- Release: June 29 – August 19, 2009

Bunny Maloney is a French animesque computer-animated television series created by Studio Tanuki and directed by Stéphane Stoll. The series is produced by MoonScoop, in co-production with Telegael and France 2. It was based on Studio Tanuki's Flash-animated short film Pinpin le Lapin. The series chronicles the adventures of a pink anthropomorphic rabbit named Bunny Maloney and his friends.

Pinpin le Lapin had a few sexual references, as according to Nicolaï "Méko" Chauvet, it was originally aimed towards a mature audience. In spite of its adult nature, Chauvet's pitch was picked up by MoonScoop, a studio known for producing family-friendly content. While Bunny Maloney aired on family-friendly networks internationally, the show became notable for its sexual references and visuals. A second season was planned but never materialized.

== Synopsis ==
The show focuses on Bunny Maloney, who's constantly overconfident and blunderous. He lives in an apartment with his ill-tempered girlfriend Candy Bunny, and his meek friend Jean-François, who frequently get dragged into his conflicts. The three form the ProtecTeam – seen as notable heroes in Bunnyville – who only come together to defeat Professor Débilouman, a strange, evil yet stupid man who hinders their everyday life.

== Characters ==
=== Main ===
Bunny Maloney
Voiced by: Martial Le Minoux (French); Matt Wilkinson (English)
A pink rabbit with a New York accent. Bunny prefers to slack off in the apartment, indulging in video games, television and junk food. He is also extremely selfish if there is an opportunity he can take advantage of. He may use Jean-François to his own selfish benefit. Bunny is Candy's boyfriend, though he's a frequent target of her hostility, and doesn't think about what she wants. However, he does care about her, as misguided as he is.
Candy Bunny
Voiced by: Elisabeth Ventura (French); Jules de Jongh (English)
Another pink rabbit, with prominent blush and a red scrunchie. Candy prefers anything prissy and clean – however, she is known for an abrasive outlook. In spite of her horrible temper, the only person she can tolerate is her friend, Charlotte. Candy is Bunny's girlfriend, though she frequently lashes out on him to physically abusive extents, and outright admits to hating him. In spite of the extremely petty conflicts they have, she still cares about him. Candy even tells Bunny to stop indulging in junk food, to no success.
Jean-François
A blue cat/rabbit-like alien with droopy ears and blank eyes – only capable of saying his own name, similar to a Pokémon. Jean-François is humble and a bit odd, casually enjoying a mundane lifestyle. However, he is emotionally vulnerable, and has his limits if Bunny and Candy go too far. Jean-François usually accompanies Bunny, but due to his docile nature, Bunny may take advantage of it (sometimes to Bunny's detriment). He's frequently seen playing the fictitious rhythm game "Bust-a-Para Dance", and rather skilled at it.
Professor Débilouman
Voiced by: Marc Duquesnoy (French); Walter Lewis (English)
A short, old man with a white labcoat, spiky black hair and a long nose. Débilouman's name is derived from "débile" ("stupid" in French), fitting his comically unintelligent personality. He always comes up with bizarre, elaborate schemes that initially work, but when he's been caught, he ends up sinking in his submarine – a running gag in the series. He hates Bunny, but misses Bunny's presence when he assumes Bunny's dead. Sometimes, he's also shown to have a crush on Candy.
Modchi
Voiced by: Vincent Violette (French); Keith Wickham (English)
A purple octopus with bumps, scars and red eyes. Modchi is unwilling to help Débilouman, giving him condescending and snarky remarks instead. He does not have any grudge against Bunny, Candy and Jean-François, though there are times where he's in it with Débilouman's schemes. In a few episodes, he'll sometimes deliberately sink Débilouman's submarine.

=== Recurring ===
Stan Ookie
Voiced by: Laurent Pasquier (French); Keith Wickham (English)
A tanuki who resides in the ProtecTeam's headquarters that he communicates within a small, light blue hologram. Stan is nerdy, especially with technology, and the most level-headed – however, he also has a sillier side shown in "Stan's Perfect Match", and his solitude may have made him attached to the idea of a potential girlfriend. He may help Bunny, Candy and Jean-François out and investigate what's happening. Sometimes, he's wrongfully roped into a conflict. His name is a pun on tanuki.
Charlotte
Voiced by: Corinne Martin (French); Philippa Alexander (English)
A cow or goat (sources differ) who is Candy's best friend. Charlotte means well but is dim-witted, sometimes giving strange solutions to problems in "Bunnies Are from Mars" – and being happy to be involved, but being unskilled in "Oh! Bust-a-Para Dance". Charlotte is unashamedly sexual – she usually poses in suggestive ways, suggests Bunny to use an enema in "Cold Turkey" and is implied to have several kinks. However, these aspects end up alienating others. She has a one-sided crush on Bunny.
Noacak
Voiced by: François Jérosme (French); Tom Clarke-Hill (English)
A short old man with a large white moustache and a green militia outfit, Noacak's the general of his army in Bunnyville. He is incompetent at his job – sometimes leading to others' expense, as seen in "Text Message Madness" and "S.T.U.P.I.D".
Ben Tonari
A young boy with brown hair, who wears a yellow shirt with a red star, and somewhat speaks gibberish. He is Jean-François's friend, and the two can be seen dancing together in "Bust-a-Para Dance". He also can be seen skating in a plaza, or within crowds. His surname is derived from the Japanese term for "neighbor" (隣の人, tonari no hito).
Louis Picollin
Voiced by: Marc Duquesnoy (French); Dan Russell (English)
A overweight fly who wears a green and orange superhero suit. Optimistic and caring, he wants to join the ProtecTeam, but his job is to clean up poop around Bunnyville. In "Community Service", he temporarily becomes the leader of the ProtecTeam, though, he gets called to help out for mundane things, much to Candy and Jean-François's chagrin. He idolizes Bunny, much to the latter's chagrin.
Secretary Octopus
Voiced by: Philippa Alexander (English)
The news reporter of Bunnyville. She may show up to report something that is relevant to an episode, sometimes with a few snarky quips. In "Community Service", she punishes Bunny due to misbehavior while driving, but it's revealed that she accidentally ran over some people when she was driving herself – to which Bunny, Candy and Jean-François expose her for it. She still keeps her job, nonetheless.
Marc and Ting
Voiced by: Tom Clarke-Hill (English)
Two tall men who wear matching suits and sunglasses. Marc and Ting are a quirky duo of salesmen who advertise suspicious products. They show up for any business opportunity and appear in Bunnyville's commercials. Their names are a play on the word "marketing".
Potchi and Bunny's fish
The pets of Candy Bunny and Bunny Maloney, respectively. Potchi is a blue dog-faced puffer, though, he can only say "onyo". Bunny's four pet fish, by comparison, have a semblance of intelligence, and will either participate in Bunny's mischief or enable his behavior.

== Voice cast ==
=== French ===
- Martial Le Minoux as Bunny Maloney
- Elisabeth Ventura as Candy Bunny
- Marc Duquesnoy as Professor Débilouman, Louis Picollin
- Corinne Martin as Charlotte
- Laurent Pasquier as Stan Ookie
- Vincent Violette as Modchi
- François Jérosme as Noacak

=== English ===
- Matt Wilkinson as Bunny Maloney
- Jules de Jongh as Candy Bunny
- Walter Lewis as Professor Débilouman, ROBOT
- Keith Wickham as Stan Ookie, Modchi
- Philippa Alexander as Charlotte, Secretary Octopus
- Tom Clarke-Hill as Ting
- Dan Russell as Additional voices

== Episodes ==
A second season was planned to be made in 2011, but ended up being unproduced, due to funding issues and MoonScoop going bankrupt at the time.

No.	Title	Written by
1	"Casanova Clone" (French: Candy voit double)	Erika Strobel
A duplicate of Bunny Maloney has been created by Débilouman and it's up to Bunny to stop him.
2	"Text Message Madness" (French: Sos SMS)	Erika Strobel
3	"Atomic Flea" (French: La puce atomique)	Erika Strobel
4	"Rabid Rabbit" (French: Bunny-sitter)	Erika Strobel, Lee Walters
5	"Hasta La Vista, Bunny" (French: Hasta la vista, Bunny!)	Erika Strobel, Lee Walters
6	"Candy's Birthday Surprise" (French: Joyeux anniversaire, Candy!)	Erika Strobel, Lee Walters
7	"Noacak Wants You" (French: En avant, marche!)	Lee Walters
8	"A Wrinkle in the ProtecTeam" (French: Ô ride, ô désespoir)	Elly Brewer
9	"Polterabbitgeist" (French: Nos ancêtres les lapins)	Dave Fouracre, Dylan Owen
10	"Bunny's Fish Go Off" (French: Mes chers poissons)	Elly Brewer
11	"Bunny's Big Hit" (French: Bunny rebondit)	Lee Walters
12	"Carrots Are a Girl's Best Friend" (French: Les carottes sont éternelles)	Nicolas Sedel, Fernando Worcel
13	"Germ-Free" (French: Ménage de printemps)	Elly Brewer
14	"Spouse or Louse" (French: Moitié ou minable)	Dave Fouracre, Dylan Owen
15	"The Dispense Sense 9000" (French: L'interprétator 9000)	Lee Walters
16	"Dawn of the Shrimp" (French: La Nuit des Crevettes Zombies)	Lee Walters
17	"Jean-François: Super Model" (French: Jean François top modèle)	Nicolas Sedel, Fernando Worcel
18	"Bunnies Are from Mars" (French: Les lapins viennent de Mars)	Nicolas Sedel, Fernando Worcel
19	"Community Service" (French: Travaux d'intérêt général)	Lee Walters
20	"Stuck with Me" (French: Sauve qui peut)	Muriel Achery
21	"Free Potchi" (French: Libérez Potchi)	Nicolas Sedel, Fernando Worcel
22	"S.T.U.P.I.D." (French: Stupide Machine)	Marie Bearmore
23	"Oh, Bust-a-Para Dance!" (French: Le marathon de Java-Danse)	Muriel Achery
24	"Fishing for Trouble" (French: En queue de poisson)	Marie Bearmore
25	"Raucous Caucus" (French: Votez Bunny!)	Elly Brewer
26	"OnYooo" (French: OnYooo)	Muriel Achery
27	"Bunny Story" (French: De mémoire de Bunny)	Gerard Foster
28	"Stan's Perfect Match" (French: Stan, cœur à prendre)	Muriel Achery, Robert Weatherby
29	"The Wrong Diagnosis" (French: Docteur Ookie)	Lee Walters
30	"Charity" (French: Charité bien ordonnée)	Lee Walters
31	"Sick Bunny" (French: Bunny est malade)	Gerard Foster
32	"Candy Lost and Found" (French: Candy tombe des nues)	Elly Brewer
33	"It's on the Cards" (French: Mystique en toc)	Elly Brewer
34	"Heaven Scent" (French: Bunny au parfum)	Marie Bearmore
35	"Hypochondriac" (French: Alerte à l'haleine verte)	Robert Weatherby
36	"The Good, The Bad and the Cookie" (French: Cookie folies)	Nicolas Sedel, Fernando Worcel
37	"Nanny State" (French: Les carottes, c'est la santé)	Lee Walters
38	"Business as Usual" (French: Sauvetage en promo)	Lee Walters
39	"Passport to Bunnyvania" (French: Viva Bunnyvania)	Marie Bearmore
40	"Cold Turkey" (French: Pas de burgers pour Bunny)	Marie Bearmore
41	"Think Extinct" (French: Un problème de taille)	Lee Walters, Gerard Foster
42	"Rabbit vs. Rabbit" (French: Lapin contre lapin)	Nicolas Sedel, Fernando Worcel
43	"The D-Fixitup" (French: D-Répare-Tout)	Florian Ferrier, Robert Weatherby
44	"We Come in Peace" (French: Nous arrivons en paix)	Lee Walters
45	"Dead Bunny" (French: Feu Bunny)	Gerard Foster
46	"Full House" (French: Gros comme une maison)	Robert Weatherby
47	"Doomsday" (French: Jugement dernier)	Ardella Jones
48	"Computers Have Feelings, Too" (French: Mon ordi a du cœur)	Lee Walters
49	"Trading Places" (French: Vis ma vie)	Marie Bearmore
50	"Funny Bunny" (French: Bunny brûle les planches)	Ardella Jones
51	"Made for TV" (French: Echec et audimat)	Lee Walters
52	"The Legend of the Bag Man" (French: La légende de Sac Man)	Gerard Foster

== Production ==
Bunny Maloney was originally conceptualized as an adult-animated short film titled Pinpin le Lapin: Attack of the Giant Red Octopus (French: Pinpin le Lapin: L'attaque de rouge geant) in 2002 by Studio Tanuki, consisting of artist Nicolaï "Méko" Chauvet and his friends Utku Kaplan and Nicolas Flory at that time. Pinpin le Lapin has various references, mainly to anime and a few Japanese properties. In 2003, Pinpin le Lapin was sent as an entry to the Annecy International Animation Film Festival, and the short film won an award. Chauvet later changed this concept if he were to pitch it as a televised series, intending to aim it towards teenagers.

MoonScoop greenlit Pinpin le Lapin for a series, though many changes were made to cater the concept to a younger audience. Chauvet was unable to contribute to the show, only being called for graphic design at most. Pinpin le Lapin's name was eventually changed to Bunny Maloney, due to middle-aged mothers at MoonScoop thinking it would be more appealing to an English-speaking audience. Chauvet said that he's lucky to have Stéphane Stoll direct, as Stoll understood Chauvet's concerns and wanted to push the show's limits, causing it to have prominently sexual jokes compared to other animated shows at that time.

Characters from the show were also used in a Moët & Chandon campaign in February 2010, a short film known as "Fallen in Love", as well as three e-mail animations known as "Moët's 'Love Mail'" were made, as well as co-produced by MoonScoop.

The series was also subjected to having a mobile offer for the Club Zed brand in 2011, under the partnership of MoonScoop and Zed Group; containing logos, animations, videos, ringtones, etc.

== Broadcast ==
In France, Bunny Maloney was officially premiered on 29 June 2009, on the TV channels Canal+ and Canal+ Family during the Canaille + programming block.

The show was originally intended to air on 29 March 2009, but was postponed at the last minute, due to the leaders of Canal+ Family finding the show unsuitable to air on Cartoon+ – a block aiming for young audiences. The show was later delayed to a new premiere date at June. Prior to official release, the first three episodes were broadcast on Canal+ throughout April and May as sneak previews.

The show also planned to air on France 2, but never did; later airing on sister channel France Ô (via their youth-oriented ôôôôÔ ! block) in 2011, until 2013. It was also planned to be broadcast on France 4 (via the tween-aimed Ludo block). The show was also aired on regional France Télévisions channels (e.g. France 3 Via Stella and the La 1ère channels) until March 2016.

An English dub aired on Kabillion in the United States, and Kix in the United Kingdom.

Network	Country
Canal+ Canal+ Family; Game One; France Ô	France
Kabillion	United States
Kix!	United Kingdom
Canal Panda	Portugal
NTV7	Malaysia
True Spark	Thailand
Orlando Kids	Bosnia
Chutti TV	India

== Awards ==
Award	Year	Category	Result	Ref
Anime & Manga Grand Prix	2010	Best Non-Japanese Anime	Won	
Cartoons on the Bay	2010	TV Series for Tweens	Nominated	
