= Mirror's Edge (mobile) =

2010 video game

- App Store logo
- Developer: IronMonkey Studios
- Publisher: Electronic Arts
- Platforms: iOS, Windows Phone
- Release: iPad: WW: April 1, 2010; iPhone: WW: September 2, 2010; Windows Phone: WW: July 13, 2012
- Genre: Platform
- Modes: Single-player, multiplayer

Mirror's Edge is a side-scrolling platform game developed by IronMonkey Studios and published by Electronic Arts. It was released for iPad and iPhone in 2010, and for Windows Phone in 2012. The game is a prequel to the original Mirror's Edge, setting the scene about Runners and the city's shady corporations. It received very positive reviews from critics.

== Gameplay ==
The player, controlling Faith Connors, jumps over an obstacle.

Mirror's Edge is a side-scrolling platform game where the player must control the protagonist, Faith Connors, as she navigates a city. The game acts as a prequel to the original Mirror's Edge, setting the scene about Runners and the city's shady corporations. To progress through the game, the player must complete 14 levels as fast as possible while getting past opponents controlled by the game's artificial intelligence. The player has the ability to dash, jump, wall-run, slide, and use zip lines. Although Faith cannot use weapons, the player can perform melee attacks and disarm opponents. Records can be uploaded to online leaderboards. Other player's records can be downloaded as Ghosts, which serve as recordings that show the player the path other players took.

The game includes a split-screen multiplayer mode, where two players may race each other across any of the game's unlocked levels. Another multiplayer mode, Rivals, involves players collecting bags under a time limit.

== Development and release ==
Mirror's Edge was developed by IronMonkey Studios, a video game studio based in Melbourne, Australia. The game was originally announced on December 2, 2009, for iPhone and intended to be released in January 2010, but it was delayed so that the developers could add more content and make additional tweaks. It was later decided that the game would first be released on April 1, 2010, for the iPad's launch. An iPhone version was ultimately released on September 2, 2010. Although both versions are essentially the same game, the iPhone version does not include a multiplayer mode. Another version was released for Nokia Lumia Windows Phones on July 13, 2012. In 2015, the game was removed from the App Store because it does not support iOS versions newer than 7.1.2.

== Reception ==
Reception

Aggregate score
Aggregator	Score
Metacritic	89/100

Review scores
Publication	Score
Eurogamer	8/10
GamePro	4.5/5
IGN	8.5/10
Pocket Gamer	4/5

Mirror's Edge received very positive reviews from critics, who frequently compared it to Canabalt. IGN considered Mirror's Edge one of the best launch games for the iPad, while Eurogamer described it as a "beautiful 2.5D interpretation" of the original, praising its intuitive controls and Faith's fluid animations. Reviewing the iPhone version, Kotaku editor Luke Plunkett criticized the game's short length due to the lack of a multiplayer mode, stating that the game can be finished in half an hour, but nevertheless praised its simple and responsive controls. He also praised the graphics for their crisp and colorful textures, especially when the game is played on iPhone 4 or iPod Touch 4 devices. As of November 2010, the game has sold more than 37,000 copies.
