= Fallingwater (album) =

Studio album by Lisa Miskovsky
- Released: 22 October 2003 (Sweden); June 13, 2005 (UK)
- Recorded: 2003
- Genres: Pop, pop rock, country pop
- Length: 50:20
- Label: Stockholm Records
- Producers: Joakim Berg, Simon Nordberg

Lisa Miskovsky chronology
Lisa Miskovsky (2001)	Fallingwater (2003)	Changes (2006)

Alternative cover

Professional ratings
Review scores
Source	Rating
MusicOMH	Unfavorable link
contactmusic.com	Favorable link
bbc.co.uk	link
indielondon.co.uk	Favorable link
Virgin Media	Favorable link
RTÉ.ie	link
Allmusic	3.5/5 stars

Fallingwater is Lisa Miskovsky's second album, and was released in Sweden on 22 October 2003 and in the UK on 13 June 2005. It was her first to reach number one on the Swedish charts, which happened on 31 October 2003.

== Track listing ==
No.	Title	Writer(s)	Length
1.	"Lady Stardust"	Joakim Berg, Miskovsky	4:42
2.	"A Brand New Day"	Berg, Miskovsky	3:44
3.	"Sing to Me"	Berg, Miskovsky	4:37
4.	"You Dance Just like Me"	Miskovsky	3:14
5.	"Sweet Dreams"	Berg, Miskovsky	3:18
6.	"One Dark Night"	Miskovsky	4:43
7.	"Midnight Sun"	Berg, Miskovsky	3:47
8.	"Butterfly Man"	Berg, Miskovsky	4:47
9.	"Restless Heart"	Berg, Miskovsky	5:22
10.	"Joan of Arc"	Berg, Miskovsky	5:05
11.	"Take Me by the Hand"	Berg, Miskovsky	3:54
12.	"Back to Stoneberry Road"	Berg, Miskovsky	3:05

Bonus tracks

1. Shells (Berg/Miskovsky)
2. Please Forgive Me (Berg Miskovsky)

== Singles ==
1. Lady Stardust
2. Sing to Me
3. A Brand New Day

== Charts ==
=== Weekly charts ===
Chart (2003–2004)	Peak position
Swedish Albums (Sverigetopplistan)	1

=== Year-end charts ===
Chart (2003)	Position
Swedish Albums (Sverigetopplistan)	18
Chart (2004)	Position
Swedish Albums (Sverigetopplistan)	20
