= Lisa Miskovsky =

Swedish singer

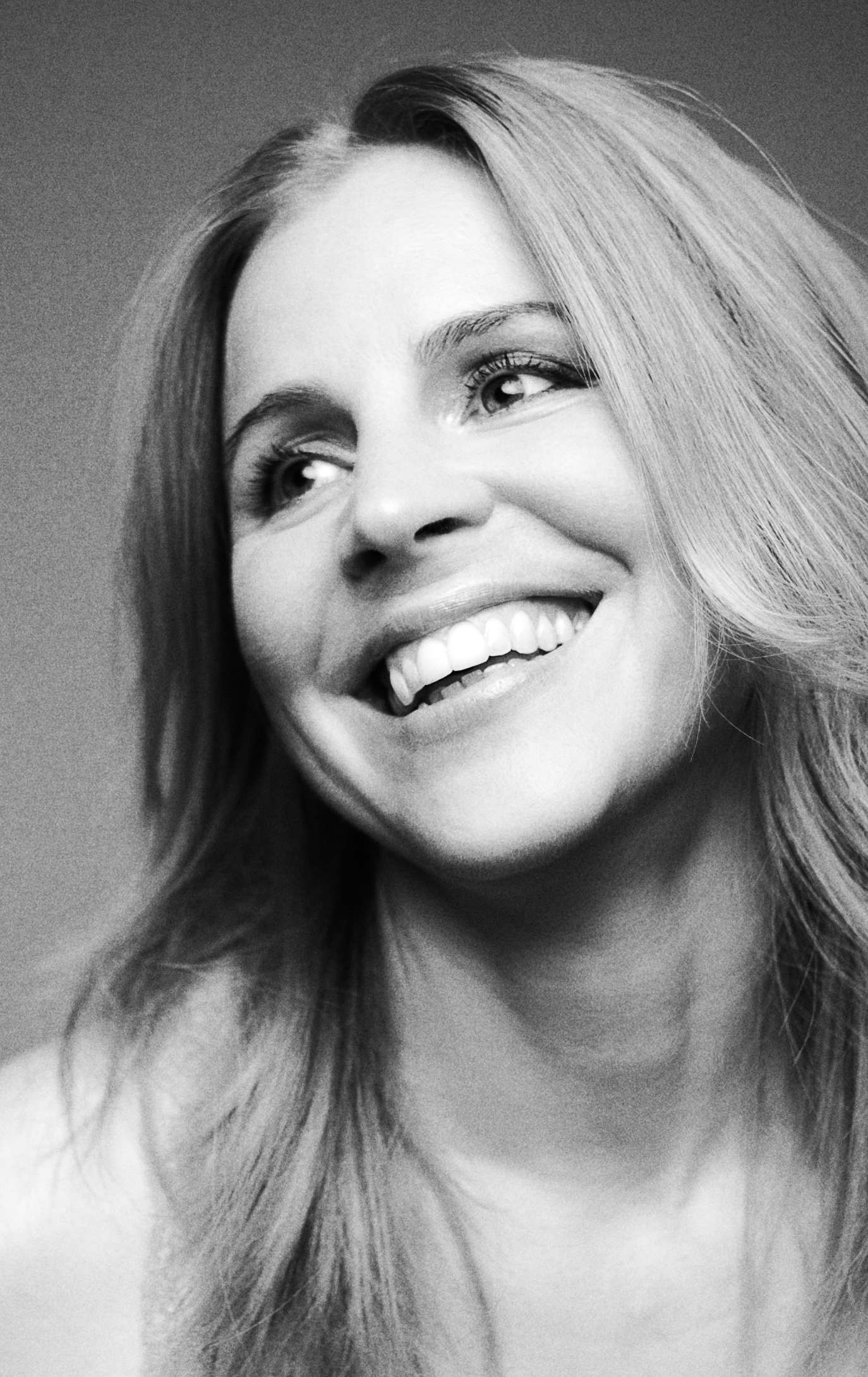

Background information
- Born: 9 March 1975 (age 51); Obbola, Sweden
- Genres: Pop; rock
- Occupations: Singer; musician; songwriter
- Instruments: Vocals; guitar; piano
- Years active: 2001–present
- Labels: Stockholm; Universal Sweden; Sony Sweden; Columbia Sweden; Despotz

Lisa Miskovsky (born 9 March 1975) is a Swedish pop and rock singer.

== Career ==
Miskovsky placed herself on the Swedish rock music charts with her debut album Lisa Miskovsky and single "Driving One of Your Cars", with Swedish releases in 2001. Following this release, she received two Swedish Rock Bear awards; one for Best Swedish Newcomer, and the other for Best Swedish Female Artist of the Year. She followed up with the album Fallingwater, released in 2003, which climbed to number one in the Swedish pop charts, reaching platinum sales. The album contained two hit songs, "Lady Stardust" and "Sing to Me". "Lady Stardust" was also a radio hit in Europe, particularly in Germany and the United Kingdom.

Some of her music was co-written and produced by Joakim Berg, lead songwriter from the Swedish rock band Kent, and Simon Nordberg.

Miskovsky had the original idea and wrote the lyrics to "Shape of My Heart", performed by Backstreet Boys.

Miskovsky contributed vocals to the track "Dead End" on Come Clarity, the 2006 release from Swedish melodic death metal band In Flames.

Miskovsky performed the theme song "Still Alive" for Mirror's Edge, an action-adventure video game developed by EA Digital Illusions CE (DICE). A remix album titled Still Alive: The Remixes was released on 11 November 2008 to coincide with the North American release date of Mirror's Edge. The album featured Miskovsky's original version, along with remixes by Benny Benassi, Junkie XL, Paul van Dyk, Armand van Helden, and Teddybears.

In 2011, she released her fourth studio album, Violent Sky, after moving record labels from Universal Music to Sony Music Entertainment.

Miskovsky entered Melodifestivalen 2012, the Swedish preselection for the Eurovision Song Contest 2012 with the song "Why Start a Fire". Lisa competed in the fourth semifinal and placed in the top two songs of the heat. Lisa competed at the final in Stockholm in 2012, where she finished 9th.

Ten years after her last entry into the contest, Miskovsky entered Melodifestivalen 2022 with the song "Best to Come". She performed on 19 February 2022 and finished third, qualifying to the semi-final. She performed again at second semi-final on 5 March 2022, finishing third and failing to qualify to the final.

== Personal life ==
Besides music, Miskovsky enjoys snowboarding and has participated in the Swedish national snowboard team.

Her mother, Pirjo, is Finnish and her father, Karel Miškovský, is a Czech immigrant. Her sister is Carolina Miskovsky; the two have performed together publicly.

She shared in a fan interview at Melodifestivalen 2012, that she is a mother with two daughters, however she did not reveal any other personal information. In 2003, she married a Norwegian snowboarder, Marius Sommer. They filed for divorce in 2006 but reconciled for a time. They separated in September 2014. She resides in Umeå.

During the 2014 Winter Olympics she was a sports reporter on location, mainly covering snowboard and freestyle skiing.

== Discography ==
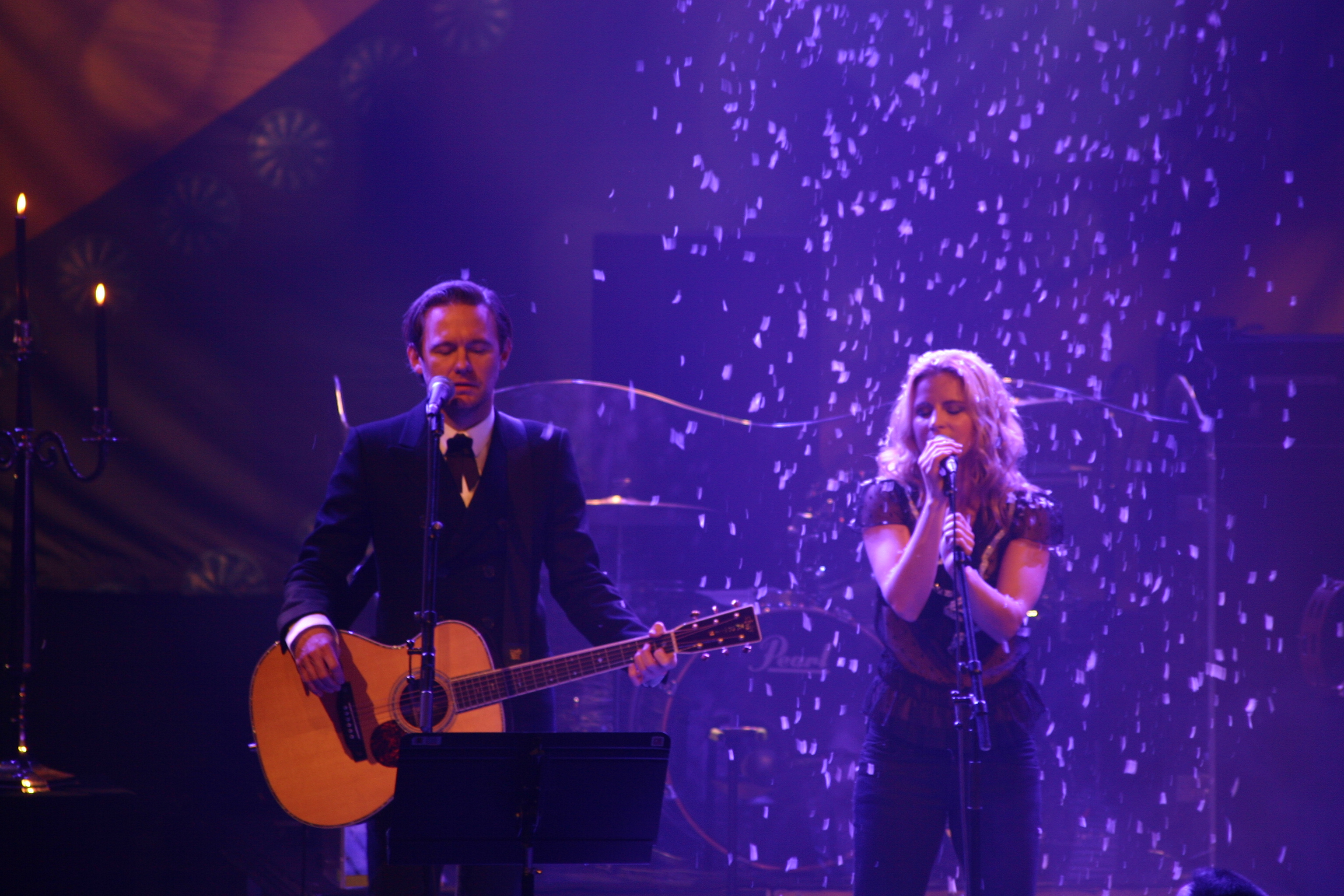
Miskovsky (right) performing alongside Joakim Berg in 2006

=== Studio albums ===
Year	Album details	Peak chart positions	Certifications
Year	Album details	SWE	Certifications
2001	Lisa Miskovsky: Released: 25 April 2001; Label: Stockholm Records; Formats: CD, digital download	23	SWE: Gold
2003	Fallingwater: Released: 22 October 2003; Label: Stockholm Records; Formats: CD, digital download	1	SWE: Platinum
2006	Changes: Released: 30 August 2006; Label: Universal Music Sweden; Formats: CD, digital download	2	SWE: Gold
2011	Violent Sky: Released: 28 January 2011; Label: Sony Music Entertainment Sweden; Formats: CD, digital download	4	
2013	Umeå: Released: September 2013; Label: Columbia Records Sweden; Formats: CD, digital download	7	
2019	Bottenviken: Released: September 2019; Label: Despotz Records; Formats: LP, CD, digital download		
"—" denotes releases that did not chart or not released to that country

=== Compilation albums ===
Year	Album	Chart positions
Year	Album	SWE
2008	Last Year's Songs: Greatest Hits: Released: 21 July 2008; Label: Universal Music Sweden	13

=== Singles ===
Year	Title	Album	Chart positions
Year	Title	Album	SWE
2001	"Driving One of Your Cars"	Lisa Miskovsky	14
2001	"What If"	Lisa Miskovsky	41
2002	"Quietly"	Lisa Miskovsky	—
2003	"Lady Stardust"	Fallingwater	6
2004	"Sing to Me"	Fallingwater	26
2004	"A Brand New Day"	Fallingwater	59
2006	"Mary"	Changes	17
2006	"Sweet Misery"	Changes	53
2006	"Acceptable Losses"	Changes	—
2008	"Another Shape of My Heart"	Last Year's Songs: Greatest Hits	45
2008	"Still Alive"	Mirror's Edge	29
2010	"Lover"	Violent Sky	59
2011	"Got a Friend"	Violent Sky	—
2012	"Why Start a Fire"	Umeå	15
2012	"Wild Winds"	Umeå	—
2013	"Coming On Strong"	Umeå	—
2022	"Best to Come"	Melodifestivalen 2022	40

=== Other ===
- 2005: Kent - Max 500 (vocals on "Välgärningar & Illdåd")
- 2006: In Flames - Come Clarity (vocals on "Dead End")
- 2008: Still Alive (theme for the video game Mirror's Edge) #8 UK Indie chart #96 UK chart #23 Billboard Hot Dance Club Play
- 2013: Comfort You (lyrics) & Home (featuring Marion Raven) (vocals & lyrics), both songs for Raven's latest album Songs from a Blackbird #3 in Norway.
