= Changes (Lisa Miskovsky album) =

Studio album by Lisa Miskovsky
- Released: 2006
- Genres: Pop, Pop/Rock
- Label: Universal

Lisa Miskovsky chronology
Fallingwater (2003)	Changes (2006)	Violent Sky (2011)

Changes is Lisa Miskovsky's third album released in 2006.

The album came three years after Fallingwater. The last year in particular had been difficult for Miskovsky, who went through a divorce, and as a result the new record was described as "darker".

The album entered the Swedish charts in September 2006, instantly reaching #2, its peak placement. It remained on the chart for 31 weeks until April 2007.

Changes received mixed reviews. It did win Album of the Year at the Rockbjörnen award show in early 2007, where Miskovsky also became Female Artist of the Year.

== Track listing ==
1. "Little Bird"
2. "Acceptable Losses"
3. "Mary"
4. "Been Through This"
5. "Foxholes"
6. "California Heart"
7. "Sweet Misery"
8. "Last Year's Song"
9. "As Daylight Fades"
10. "Please"
11. "Once Gone, Always Missing"
12. "20th of December Madison Avenue"
