= Carolina Miskovsky =

Swedish musician

- Born: Carolina Miskovsky; January 14, 1978 (age 48)
- Genres: Pop, rock
- Occupations: Musician, singer, songwriter
- Instrument: Guitar

Carolina Miskovsky is a Swedish musician.

== Personal life ==
Miskovsky was born on 14 January 1978 in Vännfors, Sweden. She is the sister of Lisa Miskovsky.

Miskovsky studied rock engineering at Luleå University of Technology from 2002 to 2004.

== Discography ==
=== Album ===
- 2005: Silence

=== Singles ===
- 2005: "Remember Me"
- 2005: "Like Wine"
