= Moon Tycoon =

2001 video game

- Developer: Legacy Interactive
- Publisher: Anarchy Enterprises
- Platform: PC
- Release: October 2, 2001 (US) August 15, 2003 (UK)
- Genre: city-building game
- Mode: Single Player

Moon Tycoon is a city-building computer game released in 2001 by Anarchy Enterprises and Unique Entertainment. It is based on the creation of a lunar colony, or rather a lunar city. Anarchy Enterprises described it as the "first 3-D Sim game ever", and noted that it has similarities to SimCity (which at the time was 2-dimensional).

== Gameplay ==
Moon Tycoon has three campaigns to play through, each with its own story-line and placed around the year 2021.

Campaign 1: Earth is in a global energy crisis, and the only thing that can stop it is a precious resource called helium-3 that can be found on the Moon in vast quantities.

Campaign 2: The energy crisis is over, but competition begins to heat up as corporations battle for lunar domination as space borne epidemics, discontent over living conditions and space disasters become more frequent.

Campaign 3: Mankind makes yet another leap as it begins the next stage of space exploration: the colonization of the asteroid belt.

Each campaign has ten levels to play through each with varied levels of difficulty. All three campaigns make up a larger story, so they can only be played in order and starting with the first. There is also a sandbox mode available, where the player can set the starting money, terrain type, ore quantity and average building life; it also lets the player select whether they want to play on the Moon or on an asteroid.

The game is played on the Play Area, on which both completed and under-construction structures are displayed. Players also use this screen to begin construction of buildings and alter the terrain. The play area is raised up from the surrounding view and can also have a grid.

The building menu display the various types of structures available for construction. These buildings are divided into different categories: Housing and Medical, Tourism, Research, Rewards (earned by different objectives), Utilities, and Industry.

== Reception ==
Moon Tycoon was compared to SimCity, but praised for its innovative 3D graphics. Although Moon Tycoon was well received by US based game review website, GameZone, overseas it was not well reviewed scoring poorly by two foreign reviewers

== Deep Sea Tycoon ==
Deep Sea Tycoon
- Developer: Anarchy Enterprises
- Publisher: Activision Value Publishing
- Platform: Microsoft Windows
- Release: November 7, 2003
- Genre: Business simulation

The spiritual sequel, Deep Sea Tycoon, often confused with Atlantis Underwater Tycoon and titled Aquatic Tycoon in France, is a 2003 video game developed by Anarchy Enterprises and published by Unique Entertainment. This game involves you building an underwater city in 3D. It has a sequel, Deep Sea Tycoon 2, developed by Pixel after Pixel.

=== Gameplay ===
The gameplay of Deep Sea Tycoon involves choosing one of 24 different characters and creating an underwater city filled with different buildings and features, from Mermaid Palaces to Seafood Restaurants. Through the character they choose and the choices they make in their city, the player can become a ruthless business magnate or an environmentalist.

The gameplay is similar to Moon Tycoon. The player creates buildings on a flat piece of land, that must be connected to other buildings by tunnels. The only major differences are the scenario and the types of buildings each game uses.

=== Reception ===
Deep Sea Tycoon 2 has been reviewed by X-Play, being given a 1 out of 5. Being noted for being boring by having "ridiculously easy challenges" and simple challenges of only having to "click my mouse button twice". As a final note in their review, Adam Sessler noted that Game Tycoon was more entertaining than Deep Sea Tycoon 2.
