= Mirror's Edge =

2008 video game

- Cover art depicting Faith
- Developer: DICE (Note: Additional work by Electronic Arts Shanghai)
- Publisher: Electronic Arts
- Director: Senta Jakobsen
- Producer: Owen O'Brien
- Designer: Thomas Andersson
- Programmer: Per-Olof Romell
- Artist: Johannes Söderqvist
- Writer: Rhianna Pratchett
- Composer: Solar Fields
- Engine: Unreal Engine 3
- Platforms: PlayStation 3; Xbox 360; Windows
- Release: PlayStation 3, Xbox 360: NA: November 11, 2008; AU: November 13, 2008; EU: November 14, 2008; Windows: NA: January 12, 2009; AU: January 15, 2009; EU: January 16, 2009
- Genres: Action-adventure, platform, first-person shooter
- Mode: Single-player

Mirror's Edge is a 2008 first-person action-adventure platform game developed by DICE and published by Electronic Arts. The game was released for PlayStation 3 and Xbox 360 in November 2008, and for Windows in January 2009. Set in a near-future city, it follows the story of Faith Connors, an underground parkour courier who transmits messages while evading government surveillance. To progress through the game, the player must control Faith from a first-person perspective and complete a series of levels that involve performing a sequence of acrobatic maneuvers, including jumping between rooftops, running across walls, and sliding down zip lines. The game is an action-adventure game with platform and first-person shooter mechanics.

Inspired by chase scenes featured in Casino Royale and the Bourne films, Mirror's Edge features hundreds of first-person animations to convey Faith's movement and interactions with the environment. The game is powered by Unreal Engine 3, but a new lighting solution was created to better reflect colors, create soft shadows, and give the game a unique art style. The game deliberately makes use of strong primary colors, with outdoor environments predominantly featuring white and distinctively lacking in green. The game was written by Rhianna Pratchett, and its score was composed by electronic music artist Solar Fields, while the main theme song was composed by Swedish producers Rami Yacoub and Arnthor Birgisson and performed by Swedish musician Lisa Miskovsky.

Upon release, Mirror's Edge received generally positive reviews from critics, who praised its visuals and immersive first-person perspective, but criticized its trial and error gameplay, combat mechanics, and restrictive levels. The game sold around 2.5 million units by June 2013, and won Adventure Game of the Year at the 2009 Interactive Achievement Awards. Retrospectively, Mirror's Edge has grown in esteem and developed a passionate fanbase due to its strong aesthetics and innovative game design. A prequel to the game, also titled Mirror's Edge, was released for mobile devices in 2010. A reboot that explores a new origin story for Faith, titled Mirror's Edge Catalyst, was released in 2016.

== Gameplay ==
The player jumps towards a zip line, which is highlighted in red by the game's navigation system.

Mirror's Edge is an action-adventure platform game where the player must control the protagonist, Faith Connors, from a first-person perspective and navigate a city. To progress through the game and its storyline, the player needs to complete a series of levels that involve performing a linear sequence of acrobatic maneuvers. These include jumping between rooftops, running across walls, climbing pipes, walking along ledges, sliding down zip lines, and getting past opponents controlled by the game's artificial intelligence. The visibility of Faith's arms and legs is used to convey her movement and interactions with the environment. Her momentum is an important aspect of the gameplay, as preserving it through multiple obstacles allows the player to run faster, jump farther and climb higher. To help players chain moves seamlessly, the game employs a navigation system, called Runner Vision, which turns certain objects to a bold red color as Faith approaches them, allowing the player to instantly recognize paths and escape routes.

Although the player can perform melee attacks and disarm opponents, using weapons is generally discouraged as they slow Faith down and hinder her acrobatic abilities. For example, carrying a weapon that is heavier than a pistol prevents the player from being able to jump and grab ledges. Weapons have a finite magazine and must be discarded when they run out of ammunition. If Faith has preserved enough momentum, the player may use an ability called Reaction Time, which temporarily slows the gameplay down and allows the player to time their next move. Faith has a certain amount of health which automatically regenerates when she does not take damage for a brief period. If Faith falls off a significantly high position or her health is fully depleted, the player must start the level again from the latest checkpoint. In each level, the player may also find and collect three hidden yellow bags. These encourage the player to explore the game and unlock achievements.

In addition to the game's story mode, Mirror's Edge features a time trial mode where the player must complete courses as fast as possible. Each course is divided into multiple sections and has three qualifying times to beat. Although the first courses are unlocked as the player progresses through the story mode, additional courses can be unlocked by beating qualifying times. Records can be uploaded to online leaderboards, where the player can compare their performance with others. The player may also download recordings of other players, called Ghosts, to show them the path they took through a course and help them improve their records. Additional achievements can be unlocked by reaching certain milestones.

== Synopsis ==
=== Setting and characters ===
Mirror's Edge is set in a near-future city where life is comfortable and crime is almost non-existent. The city's state of bliss is achieved by an oppressive regime that controls the media and its citizens. An underground crew of parkour couriers, called Runners, operate independently from the city's security and surveillance measures, delivering private goods and sensitive information. At the same time, a new candidate, Robert Pope, is challenging the incumbent Mayor Callaghan on a platform of deregulation. The game follows the story of Faith Connors, a 24-year-old Runner who lost her mother when campaigning against the city shifting from its vibrant atmosphere to its current regime 18 years before the game's events. Faith was trained by former Runner Mercury "Merc", who now provides her with intelligence and radio support. Faith's twin sister, Kate, is a disciplined police officer who has a lot of affection for Faith but is also committed to protecting the city.

=== Plot ===
After completing a delivery to fellow Runner Celeste, Faith learns that Pope has been killed and that her sister has been framed for his murder. Faith tries to get Kate to flee with her, but she refuses, saying it would only make her look guilty. After making her way through the city's storm drains, Faith learns from former Runner Jacknife that Pope's head of security, Travis "Ropeburn" Burfield, may be connected to Pope's murder. She then infiltrates Ropeburn's office, where she overhears him setting up a secret meeting at an unfinished building. Faith informs Kate's wary superior officer, Lieutenant Miller, of what she has learned, but he refuses to help her.

Later, at the meeting, Faith confronts Ropeburn, who admits that he framed Kate and hired someone to kill Pope, but he is killed by a sniper shortly afterward. Before he dies, Ropeburn tells Faith that he was going to meet the assassin at the New Eden Mall. Faith heads there, but the killer flees once they see Faith. Lacking other leads, Faith investigates Pirandello Kruger, a private security firm that has begun aiding the police forces in capturing Runners. She finds they are behind "Project Icarus", a program designed to train special forces to eliminate Runners and control the city. Faith follows the trail of Ropeburn's killer to a boat that is docked at a nearby wharf. There, she learns that the assassin is Celeste, who decided to collude with Project Icarus to live a more comfortable life. She also explains that Pope had to be killed because he was seen as a threat, especially once he discovered Project Icarus.

With Kate convicted of Pope's murder, Merc helps Faith find a way to ambush the police convoy that is transporting her to prison. Faith succeeds and sends Kate to Merc's hideout while she leads the police forces away. Upon her return, Faith finds Merc critically injured and his hideout completely ransacked. Before he dies, Merc tells Faith that Kate has been taken to the Shard, the tallest skyscraper in the city and Callaghan's fortress. With Miller's help, Faith breaks into the Shard, destroying the servers that run the city's surveillance systems. On the rooftop helipad, she finds Kate held at gunpoint by Jacknife, who reveals that he is also part of Project Icarus. As Jacknife takes Kate onto a departing helicopter, Faith jumps onto it and knocks him out to his death. Faith and Kate then jump off to safety before the helicopter crashes.

During the game's end credits, the media reports that Faith's actions have only served to intensify the city's security and that the location of both Faith and Kate remains unknown.

== Development ==
Mirror's Edge was developed by the Swedish company DICE as part of an effort to create something fresh and interesting, anticipating a need to diversify away from the successful Battlefield franchise the studio was known for. The game was conceived in July 2006, when the studio decided to create a first-person game that would not be like a traditional first-person shooter, a genre that was considered very crowded at the time. Because first-person shooters typically focus on weapons and technology, DICE wanted Mirror's Edge to focus on the player character and their physicality. The opening chase scene of Casino Royale and the way Jason Bourne fights and runs in the Bourne film series were major inspirations for the game. Originally, the development team experimented with the player being able to drive vehicles, but the idea was ultimately dropped because they felt it would break the flow of the game. The game's protagonist emerged from a sketch illustrating an athletic female hacker, who art director Johannes Söderqvist felt suited the game very well. He explained that he was interested in a strong female character that would appeal to both women and men, and who became a hero not because of high-tech weapons, but because of her physical abilities.

Although some of the game's first-person mechanics were first prototyped in the Battlefield 2 engine, Mirror's Edge was built using Epic Games' Unreal Engine 3 because DICE's own Frostbite engine was still in the early stages of its development cycle when production of the game started. Creating all the first-person animations proved to be an ambitious task, but it was considered essential to help orient players in the game world. The game has hundreds of first-person animations and simple moves like using a ladder has over 40 animations alone. These include interactions such as jumping into it from multiple positions, climbing it up or down, or hanging on it with one hand. Although the game has a believable first-person perspective, it is not meant to be a simulation. For example, the player is able to stop quickly after a full sprint because the development team felt that keeping the inertia would make the gameplay irritating. To animate the character's in-game shadows, a different animation system runs simultaneously. The only information that is visible in the game's heads-up display is a small reticle in the center of the screen, which was added to lessen the simulation sickness associated with the free movement of the camera in first-person view.

Mirror's Edge deliberately makes use of strong primary colors, with outdoor environments predominantly featuring white and distinctively lacking in green. According to senior producer Owen O'Brien, this stylistic choice grew out of the gameplay, as it allows the player to focus on the Runner Vision guidance. It also serves as a health indicator, as colors desaturate when Faith takes damage. A new lighting solution called Beast was developed by Illuminate Labs, a company based in southern Sweden, in collaboration with DICE. This technology is able to reflect colors and create numerous soft shadows, giving the game a unique art style. Achieving the desired lighting was a difficult process for the development team, as it involved extensive hand tweaking and a considerable amount of time to render each level. To speed up the rendering process, DICE invested in around 400 CPU cores, which were cooled in a dedicated room with a large air conditioning unit. The storm drains in the game's third level were inspired by Tokyo's Underground Discharge Channel. The game's animated cutscenes were created by an external agency because DICE had no experience with 2D animations, while some of the game's art assets were created by a company based in Shanghai.

The game's working title was "Project Faith" until mid 2007, when it was changed to its current name, suggesting that the game's city is a mirror to its inhabitants. The American TV series Firefly and its film spin-off Serenity were cited as major influences on the setting. Writer Rhianna Pratchett, hired a year and a half before release, described the society portrayed in the game as somewhere between an anti-utopia and a nanny state, stating that the game explores the contrast between citizens who give up their personal freedom for a comfortable life and those who prefer to live on the edge freely. O'Brien deliberately chose not to give the city a proper name because it was considered an amalgamation of many different cities, blending both Eastern and Western aesthetics. Around two and a half hours of in-game music were composed by electronic music artist Solar Fields. To ensure there was a good flow between the player and the game world, the score was designed to be very interactive and different parts transition seamlessly. The game's main theme song, "Still Alive", was composed by Swedish producers Rami Yacoub and Arnthor Birgisson and performed by Swedish pop singer Lisa Miskovsky. The game went gold on November 6, 2008, after nearly two years of development.

== Marketing and release ==
Mirror's Edge was first revealed to be in development when an image of Faith holding a pistol was released in June 2007. The game was formally announced by Electronic Arts at E3 in July 2007, where DICE stated that they wanted to bring innovation to established first-person mechanics. A video featuring in-game footage was presented at the Game Developers Conference in February 2008, while a playable demonstration of the game was showcased at E3 in July 2008. At that year's E3 Game Critics Awards, Mirror's Edge won Best Original Game. New in-game footage showing a portion of the game's third level was subsequently presented at the Games Convention in Leipzig, Germany in August 2008. To stimulate interest in the game's universe, Electronic Arts partnered with WildStorm to produce a six-issue comic book adaptation drawn by artist Matthew Dow Smith and written by Pratchett. A demo comprising a small portion of the game was released on the PlayStation Network and Xbox Live services in October 2008. If the game was pre-ordered at certain retailers, buyers could gain access to a time trial portion of the demo and get a Mirror's Edge T-shirt by Fenchurch.

Mirror's Edge was first released for the PlayStation 3 and Xbox 360 consoles in North America on November 11, 2008, followed by a European release on November 14, 2008. Alongside the standard edition, a collector's edition, which included a red bag manufactured by Timbuk2, was made available for purchase. A remix album, Still Alive: The Remixes, featuring the Mirror's Edge theme song "Still Alive", was also released. Contributing artists include Benny Benassi, Junkie XL, Paul van Dyk, Teddybears and Armand van Helden. A Windows version of the game was released in North America on January 13, 2009, and in Europe on January 16, 2009. Unlike its console counterparts, the Windows version supports Nvidia's PhysX technology, which improves graphical effects such as glass shattering, debris, and smoke. It also includes the SecuROM digital rights management software, unless bought on Steam.

A new downloadable map for the game's time trial mode was exclusively released on the PlayStation Store for PlayStation 3 users on January 29, 2009. Seven additional time trial maps, which take place in surreal-looking stages outside of the game's city, were released for the PlayStation 3, Xbox 360 and Windows versions of the game on February 19, 2009. This was followed by Mirror's Edge 2D, a browser game adaptation by The Fancy Pants Adventures developer Brad Borne. A prequel to the game, also titled Mirror's Edge, was released for mobile devices in 2010.

=== Edge Games trademark lawsuit ===
In 2009, Electronic Arts became involved in a legal conflict with Edge Games over the use of the name Mirror’s Edge. Tim Langdell, founder of Edge Games, claimed legal ownership of the word "Edge" and its variations, including "Mirror’s Edge", "Cutting Edge", "The Edge", and "Gamer’s Edge". EA responded by filing a petition to cancel Edge Games’ trademarks, citing fraudulent registration and abuse of the trademark system. The dispute concluded in 2013, when Edge Games settled with Electronic Arts and surrendered several of its trademarks as part of the agreement. Despite this, Langdell attempted to refile the "Edge" trademarks in 2020, contrary to previous undertakings, further reinforcing his reputation as a trademark troll and a persistent figure of controversy within the industry.

== Reception ==
Reception

Aggregate score
Aggregator	Score
Metacritic	79/100 (PS3); 79/100 (X360); 81/100 (PC)

Review scores
Publication	Score
1Up.com	A−
Computer and Video Games	9/10
Edge	5/10
Eurogamer	8/10
Game Informer	8/10
GameRevolution	C
GameSpot	7/10
IGN	7.3/10 (X360); 8.5/10 (PC)
Official Xbox Magazine (US)	9.5/10
The Guardian	4/5

Mirror's Edge received "generally favorable reviews" from critics, according to the review aggregator website Metacritic. The Windows version was considered superior to its console counterparts due to its more accurate controls and extra graphical features such as PhysX effects. Game Informer described Mirror's Edge as an inspiring and "genre-defining" game, while Computer and Video Games called it "an extraordinary and special game", stating that it takes fatigued first-person mechanics into a new and daring direction. Other reviewers were not as positive towards the game. Eurogamer considered Mirror's Edge a very divisive game, with both gaping flaws and moments of brilliance. Edge felt that the game lacks depth because it forces the player to follow a predefined path, thus failing to capture anything that made parkour popular, while GameRevolution found the game to be very frustrating and unforgiving.

The game's visuals and soundtrack were praised very positively. Game Informer felt that the mix of protuberant white environments with solid primary colors creates "one of gaming's finest spectacles, and a surreal world for gamers to navigate." The Runner Vision guidance system was said to fit the game's art style, and the setting alone was considered powerful enough to make up the game's story, with The Guardian stating that Mirror's Edge is more about the environment than the people who inhabit it. Critics remarked that the game's interactive soundtrack makes Faith's runs more fluid, while sound effects such as her breathy heaves and noisy footsteps were said to enhance the sense of speed and tension. The voice acting was also highlighted, with IGN noting that characters never sound "cheesy or unbelievable". However, the story was criticized for its confusing plot points and the stylistic choice of animated cutscenes were said to lack the dramatic flair of the gameplay.

The gameplay was praised for its responsive controls and immersive first-person perspective. Game Informer noted Faith's fluid acrobatic maneuvers, stating that the game succeeds at making the player feel like they are part of the game world. IGN editor Nate Ahearn agreed, saying that Faith's movement is accentuated by little nuances on-screen, which together "produce the best feeling of movement and momentum that I've gotten my hands on in a [video game]." The game's trial and error gameplay frustrated some critics. GameSpot remarked that the scenarios that involve getting past opponents are particularly annoying and require careful planning because Faith is extremely vulnerable to gunfire. Some reviewers also felt that the levels were too restrictive and linear, offering only a few branching routes for the player to uncover. Although the game was considered to be relatively short, 1Up.com felt that the option to download Ghosts in the time trial mode adds some longevity to the game.

At the 2008 Spike Video Game Awards, Mirror's Edge was nominated for Best Action Adventure Game, but lost to Grand Theft Auto IV. During the 12th Annual Interactive Achievement Awards, Mirror's Edge won Adventure Game of the Year; it was also nominated for Outstanding Achievement in Art Direction, but ultimately lost to LittleBigPlanet.

=== Sales ===
DICE marketing director Martin Frain initially projected Mirror's Edge to sell a total of three million units be sold across all platforms. According to Electronic Arts, the PlayStation 3 and Xbox 360 versions had combined sold over one million units by February 2009. In October 2010, a court document pertaining to the legal conflict between Electronic Arts and Edge Games revealed that Mirror's Edge had sold over two million units, with over 750,000 of those units having been sold in North America. EA revealed the game had sold around 2.5 million units by June 2013.

== Legacy ==
Although Mirror's Edge received satisfactory reviews upon release, the game has since grown in esteem and developed a passionate fanbase, reaching cult classic status. In a retrospective analysis, Eurogamer considered Mirror's Edge a brave and bold game, stating that no other game at the time tried to expand the potential of first-person action in so many directions. The publication also remarked that, when the game was first released, many people "didn't really 'get' it" because it uses the same template as that of first-person shooters. Game Informer stated that, while the game is not perfect, it "perfectly balanced innovation and entertainment", and described it as a "more grounded and plausible" platformer than the likes of Tomb Raider or Prince of Persia, mainly because it took the genre into a new perspective. Kotaku editor Luke Plunkett went so far as to call the game a masterpiece, stating that its unique architecture, colors, characters, perspective, acrobatics, and music give the game a timeless quality.

Publications have further recognized the game's influence on later first-person action games, including Titanfall 2, the Dying Light series, Ghostrunner, Neon White, and the cancelled Perfect Dark reboot. According to Leah Isobel from TheGamer, "Mirror's Edge inspired a generation of designers to look at platforming a little differently, bringing a breathless edge to the familiar run-and-jump gameplay loop" while introducing "visceral parkour mechanics a decade before Ghostrunner and Titanfall 2 would do the same." The game's moderate success led DICE to develop and release Mirror's Edge Catalyst, a reboot that explores a new origin story for Faith, in 2016.

DICE has paid tribute to Mirror's Edge in a content update for Battlefield 2042, titled "Eleventh Hour", where Faith's red shoes can be found as an easter egg hidden atop the arm of a mobile crane on the newly released map, "Flashpoint".

On March 21, 2023, Electronic Arts announced that Mirror's Edge will be delisted from digital stores, among several Battlefield games, with the last day to purchase being April 28, 2023. However, Electronic Arts later removed all references to Mirror’s Edge in an addendum and stated that it was an error and they do not have plans to delist the title.
