= Baby Alive =

Baby doll brand

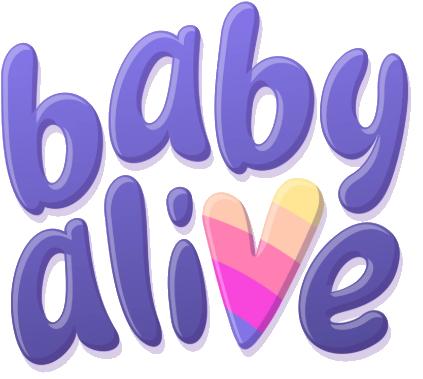
- Type: Doll
- Invented by: George Giordano
- Company: Kenner Products (1973–1996); Hasbro (2006–present)
- Country: United States
- Availability: 1973–present
- Features: movable mouth
- Slogan: "We all can take care" "Real as can be"

Baby Alive is a baby doll brand made by Hasbro that eats, drinks, wets and in some cases messes and has a movable mouth. It was originally made and introduced by Kenner in 1973, and reintroduced by Hasbro in 2006.

== History ==
=== 1970s–1980s ===
The first Baby Alive doll was introduced by Kenner in 1973. It could be fed food packets mixed with water, and came with a bottle, diapers, and feeding spoon. The spoon would be inserted into its mouth, and a lever on its back pushed to have it chew the food. The food would move through the doll and end up in her diaper as plastic waste. The doll was intentionally designed to simulate the challenges of infant care. In the early 1980s, Baby Alive achieved popularity, selling up to 1 million dolls each year.

=== 1990s ===
In 1992, the first talking Baby Alive doll was produced. It was fed in the same manner, but swallowed automatically without the need for a lever, and used a potty instead of a diaper. There were sensors located inside the doll to detect what stage the food was at, and trigger its voice to say "I have to go potty" or "All done now". These dolls did not sell well due to the loud gear noises and her "deep adult voice". It was later discontinued, and a non-speaking baby was released in 1995 with snacks and juice boxes, although these came in boxes and cans rather than packets that were mixed with water. They, as opposed to modern Baby Alive doll food and juice, had names such as Yummy Juice and Baby Cherries. It only came in two versions, Baby Alive and Baby All Gone. It appeared as a doll with blue eyes and messy curly blonde hair, not dissimilar to the modern doll, although the 1990s version seemed more traditional and less "cartoon-ey". Nowadays, Baby All Gone is fed bananas and yogurt instead of cherries, and the juice or milk is given from a bottle instead of a juice box, which saved on cardboard waste from empty boxes. A new, updated doll was introduced called Juice & Cookies Baby Alive who could be fed juice from a box, and cookies could actually be made, when a mix was put in a triangular mould, baked and removed with a scoop. The doll drank and chewed automatically.

=== Present ===
After The Kenner Company folded into Hasbro, Hasbro redesigned Baby Alive and in 2006 released a more realistic speaking doll, with additional accessories sold separately.

== Other media ==
In July 2021, Hasbro launched an animated series on YouTube based on the Baby Alive brand. The series consists of 20 episodes and centers on a seven-year-old girl named Charlie who cares for Baby Alive dolls.

== Influence and legacy ==
Time reporter Allie Townsend included Baby Alive in a list of the "100 most influential toys from 1923 to the present" remarking on the lifelike functions of the doll.
