= Art Attack (disambiguation) =

Art Attack is a British children's television programme.

Art Attack may also refer to:

- "Art Attack" (Dark Angel)
- "Art Attack" (The Detectives)
- "Art Attack" (Star Wars Rebels)
- "Art Attack" (Watch My Chops!)
- The Art Attacks
