= Pitt & Kantrop =

2005 French-British TV series

- Genre: Animated television series
- Voices of: Maria Darling; Marc Silk; Emma Tate; Keith Wickham
- Opening theme: Didier Ledan
- Countries of origin: United Kingdom; France
- No. of episodes: 37

Production
- Running time: 26 minutes
- Production company: Millimages

Original release
- Network: BBC One and CBBC (UK); Canal J (France)
- Release: 20 December 2005 – 2006

Pitt & Kantrop is a children's cartoon produced by the European Broadcasting Union (EBU) and Millimages. It was shown on BBC One and CBBC in the United Kingdom, Clan in Spain, ABC in Australia, Canal J in France, Rai 3 and Rai Gulp in Italy and Ketnet in Flanders. It follows the journey of a 13-year-old boy named Pitt and his pet pterodactyl Kantrop as they adventure through the wilderness of the Stone Age eras, and solve problems in the tribe's village. It is from the same creators of Watch My Chops.

The series title in French, Pitt et Kantrop, is a pun on pithecanthropus.

== Characters ==
- Pitt: Pitt is a very smart and reliable boy, who wants to help his tribe, the "Pitteks" advance in their every day ways of life, as he comes up with new inventions and ideas that will benefit the tribe.
- Kantrop: Kantrop is the last pterodactyl of his species, and a friend of Pitt.
- Drosera: Drosera is Sariac's wife. She likes to look down her nose at other people. She thinks Pitt is a threat to the tribe.
- Sariac: Sariac is the Big Chief. He doesn't trust anyone and thinks all the other tribesmen want to take his place. Despite this, he cares deeply for the tribe and his family.
- Vegas and Atlas: Vegas and Atlas are great hunters. They are heroic and athletic but not very clever! They obey Sariac's every word.
- Mandas: Pitt's cousin is a young hunter. He's always trying to impress Deena and thinks that one day he will marry her.
- Deena: Deena is the Chief's daughter. She is an amazing hunter and fighter and would like to become Chief. Sh
- Prosper: Prosper is the shaman and the oldest in the tribe.
- Liane: Liane is Pitt's mother/
- Stef: Stef is Pitt's dad. He is the first to run away at the sight of danger, so he's not a great hunter.
- Grenella: Grenella is Pitt's aunt. Her one aim in life is to find a husband. She gets jealous easily and loves to gossip.

== Episodes ==
=== Season One ===
No.	Title
1	"The End Justifies The Meals"
Herds have not returned from their winter migration and famine hits the Piteks' tribe. Desperate for meat, the tribe starts thinking Kantrop could very well be their next meal. Pitt has to protect Kantrop from being eaten and solve the game disappearance enigma.
2	"World Peace 0001"
Pitt discovers the Cluck-clucks, a strange tribe of bird worshipers settling nearby. The Piteks want to go to battle against these new neighbours. Pitt pleads for peace, but Mandas lures Kantrop into the Cluck-clucks' village and returns claiming Kantrop has been stolen by the enemy. Can Pitt avoid what seems to be an inevitable war?
3	"Together at Last"
It's a time of fear and suspicion: items have been stolen within the village. Pitt proposes that the whole tribe moves into Sariac's hut for safety. Hell breaks loose in this first communal living experience, while Deena takes on the real thief's trail. Pitt, Kantrop and Mandas go to her rescue.
4	"Problem Pets"
Pitt rescues a sabre-tooth tiger cub from harm. It becomes his friend, learning tricks and making Kantrop jealous. Now every Pitek wants his own cute pet too, while Kantrop grudgingly plays tricks for Deena. Meanwhile, more ferocious cubs are brought into the village, while their no less ferocious parents come looking for their offspring. Can Pitt save the tribe from this dangerous pet craze?
5	"The End is Nigh"
Fire showers down from the sky, and a meteorite even strikes the village. Convinced that this is the end of the world, the Piteks have gone crazy, losing all their inhibitions and telling each other their long-awaited truth. To save his tribe (and dad) from this end of the world madness, Pitt has to prove this is just a natural phenomenon.
6	"Pearls of Wisdom"
Pitt invents the first currency – pearls. Soon, the pearl frenzy spreads within the tribe, and Pitt's parents are heavily in debt! Meanwhile, Grenella, who secretly found a cave full of pearl oysters, is striking rich and playing bachelorette. Can Pitt teach his tribe that pearls can't buy happiness?
7	"Life is but a Dream"
Stef's recent dream of a successful hunt came true by coincidence. Now the tribe believes that whatever Stef dreams will come true. Prosper, losing his shaman prestige, swears revenge. Stef has dreamt he could fly, and, believing it will happen, intends to jump from a cliff. Pitt and Kantrop now have to prevent this dream from becoming a nightmare.
8	"Let The Show Begin"
Pitt refuses that his dad, Stef, should be put in danger in front of ferocious beasts for a laugh. Sariac accepts Pitt's plea for more intelligent entertainment – if Pitt fails, Stef's banishment in the jungle will become permanent. Pitt's first theatre rehearsals go from one disaster to the next (tribe "actors" turn into prima Donnas, and special effects backfire), while Kantrop, sent into the wild to "protect" Stef, is no help at all. Can Pitt make Sariac laugh to save his dad?
9	"The Big Head"
Sariac, stuck into his new bison headdress, can't see a thing. Fearing to be ousted if caught in such ridicule, he leaves the village guided by Prosper, while Pitt will have the Chief's cousin (a dead-ringer for Sariac) impersonate him. But the new chief is much worse than the old one. Now Pitt has to save his tribe from tyranny and give it his real leader back.
10	"Sacred Spear"
To help his pathetic hunter of a dad regain confidence, Pitt lets him believe that he's found a legendary magical spear. Soon, Stef enjoys hunting and even becomes good at it, to the point of feeling invincible. Now Stef wants to confront a herd of mammoths single-handedly. This is going too far, but will Pitt be able to save his dad from his dangerous illusion?
11	"Springtime"
Mandas wants to court Deena by bringing her back some mammoth hairs, right off the beast's back! To save him from a sure death, Pitt teaches Mandas how to win Deena's heart with romance. Meanwhile, the hunters, who are pretending to go on a wild mammoth hair hunt for their spouses, are actually having a picnic and forge their hunting trophies...But Mandas decides to go on with his initial plan. Now Pitt has to save him and the tribe's honour!
12	"The Curse of the Mashamana"
Prosper's ability as a shaman is questioned. To regain prestige (and food offerings) he predicts a curse on the tribe, and stages evidence of a rampaging monster. It works! Despite Pitt who figured out the hoax, Prosper is back in favour and "dispels" the creature for a good price. But Pitt discovers a giant crocodile roaming around the village... He warns his tribe but nobody believes him. How can Pitt get his overconfident tribe out of harm's way?
13	"The Big Wheel"
Stef promises Sariac a new hut for his birthday. Kantrop ends up hauling the stones for its construction on the flank of the mountain. To alleviate his burden, Pitt invents the wheel. But Kantrop's loads are doubled! Pitt, heartbroken, prefers to free Kantrop from this brutal exploitation. He lets Kantrop hide in the jungle, where the pterodactyl has to sharpen his survival skills. Meanwhile, Pitt realises the building site is a volcano about to erupt!
14	"You're a Big Boy Now"
Mandas wants to prove his valour to Sariac's family and become Deena's official suitor. To step into manhood, he must go into a series of trials. Deena calls Pitt to the rescue: if he succeeds in passing these trials, he can counter Mandas' plans. But can he survive the tough competition when Drosera keeps cheating and pulling the (mammoth) rug from under him?
15	"Bridging The Gap"
A huge chasm has appeared in the middle of the village, dividing it in two-halves, with tribe members on each side. Pitt invents the postal service with Kantrop, to transmit spoken messages and parcels to each side. He then engineers the building of a bridge to join both halves before they declare war on each other because of miscommunication. Meanwhile, Grenella has fallen into the chasm. Will they notice her in time to save her?
16	"A Modern Couple"
Stef and Liane are not happy with the way each gender fulfils their role at home. They are convinced they each would do a better job than their spouse! Pitt suggests a switch, for the worst, of course. Despite spectacular results at first, the tribe doesn't take the changes well, and both parents are too proud to admit the switch is a recipe for disaster. Can Pitt help them out of this mess?
17	"Fish and Ransom"
Grenella gets kidnapped by the fish tribe scouts, thinking she is the chief's wife. Delighted to meet a possible husband, Grenella let them keep her prisoner. Pitt becomes the ambassador to the tribe, and discovers they're actually holding a more and more unbearable Grenella up for ransom. Only one problem: at the Pitek village, no one seems to want Grenella back, let alone for any price! Can Pitt free Grenella without a diplomatic incident, let alone a war?
18	"Table for 15"
Liane cooks the miserable results of Stef's hunt (a mouse and a bunch of leaves). The aroma smites the whole tribe. Pitt sees this as a way to save his dad from the hunting chore: Liane will trade her cooking against some of the other hunter's game. It's a deal! Drosera, jealous that Sariac deserts her table for Liane's, decides to open her own restaurant. Now both women compete fiercely (and not always honestly), while a chase for the rare leaves is on.
19	"Sport is the Name of the Game"
The tribe's best hunters are losing stamina: they can't even catch dodo birds any more! Pitt convinces them to get some exercise by running after an inflated skin. Soon, he has to make up rules, and sport is born for the first time in human prehistory! The thing is this sport craze gets quickly out of hand: nobody hunts any more and the dodo birds are gorging on the village winter stores! Will Pitt end this sport fad before the tribe becomes exhausted (and extinct!)?
20	"Life Saver"
Pitt has saved Sariac's life. According to the tradition, the Big Chief adopts him as his son. But life in Sariac's hut is far from a picnic. Between the household chores and the learning of his one-day chief-to-be status, Pitt misses his own family. But even Stef and Liane are delighted for Pitt – they're hoping for favours in return for his new position within the tribe. Now the only way for Pitt to return to his parents is to get his own life saved by Sariac.
21	"Pitt the Jinx"
After a couple of unfortunate disasters occurring while Pitt was present, everybody thinks Pitt brings bad luck to the tribe. Pitt has to prove his tribe wrong. But the more he tries, the more they're convinced he's responsible for all of their troubles. Can Pitt persuade them that luck is what you make of it?
22	"Holiday Time!"
After an unexpected record hunt, the tribe is exhausted from smoking meat and tanning skins. Pitt suggests a holiday for the whole tribe. All they have to do is lay back and relax. As they reach a gorgeous beach, all the tribe members take Pitt on his word. They don't want to do a thing, and the relaxing time quickly turns into the holiday from Hell, while Sariac, left behind, misses bossing his tribe around terribly.
23	"Hocus Pocus!"
Much to Pitt's surprise, Prosper introduces Pitt at a shaman's reunion as the apprentice he was supposed to train for a year! Pitt has to play along to protect Prosper, whose knowledge and power amount to zero. Inevitably, the pupil outshines the master. Prosper loses his shaman's title as Pitt is crowned as a sacred child and used by Sariac to shake down other tribes! Now Pitt has to restore Prosper's status. But how?
24	"Trial by Fire"
Liane is accused of having put out the tribe's sacred fire. Pitt decides to investigate and discovers quite a few Piteks have something to hide. But the real culprit is the last one he expected. To save his mum, Pitt becomes the first detective and lawyer of human history.
25	"Secret Weapon"
A charming but exhausted cave woman is rescued in the wild by Pitt and Kantrop, who bring her back to the Pitek village. Little do they know that their guest is indeed a spy and a scout, on a mission to bring discord into the village so her tribe can move in. While the newcomer divides to conquer, will Pitt see the truth in time to save his village from being taken over?
26	"I'm the Chief, the Chief Gets All!"
Sariac, who left to attend the wedding of the bear chief's son, forgot to name a chief by default. Now every Pitek wants to take the vacant chief's seat. To avoid a civil war, Pitt invents the majority vote—and his dad is elected. Meanwhile, Mandas, thinking Deena is going to be married to the bear chief's son, decides to interrupt the ceremony.

=== Season Two ===
No.	Title
1	"The Wooden Mammoth"
Atlas is made a prisoner of the Bear Tribe, so Pitt plans to offer the Bears a wooden mammoth in order to infiltrate the village and free Atlas. Unfortunately this Homeric plan turns out to be rather difficult to put into practice.
2	"Join the Stefteks"
Stef decides to create her own tribe: the Stefteks. Pitt and Kantrop accompany him to look for a terrain where he can set up.
3	"Super Fish Man"
Mandas decides to play the masked hero in order to seduce Deena. Pitt quickly works out who is hiding behind the Super Fish Man costume.
4	"Taboo to You Too"
Pitt arranges an intercultural exchange with Sariac of the Fish tribe.
5	"Moby Pitt"
Pitt catches the biggest fish ever to be seen in the Pitek tribe. Sariac thinks he can do better so he orders Stef to build him a raft. Meanwhile, he decides that he's not going to fish in the lake, but the sea. Stef uses mud by mistake and it gets Sariac, Atlas and Vegas into much trouble, but don't worry, Pitt goes to the rescue.
6	"The Spirit of the Woods"
In the terrible black woods, Sariac, Atlas and Vegas find themselves confronting frightening phenomena.
7	"Savannah Academy"
Pitt, Mandas and Deena are sent to the prestigious Savannah Academy.
10	"Grandpa Eugene's Treasure"
Stef has a treasure map belonging to his father. Sariac sends Pitt, Kantrop, Stef and Drosera to find the treasure. But they are not the only ones after the loot!
11	"Big Tom"
A charming stranger enters the tribe and woos Grenella: but his intentions are dishonourable.
