= Keith Wickham =

English voice actor

- Born: St Albans, Hertfordshire, England
- Occupations: Voice actor, comedian, screenwriter
- Years active: 1996–present
- Known for: 64 Zoo Lane (1999–2000); Thomas & Friends
- Website: keithwickham.co.uk/

Keith Wickham is an English voice actor, comedian and screenwriter. He is known for providing the voices of various characters in the children's television series 64 Zoo Lane and Thomas and Friends.

== Career ==
Wickham voiced Changed Daily in The Secret Show, Mr. Small, and Mr. Tall in The Mr. Men Show (UK version), Corneil in Watch My Chops, Mr. Mouseling and most of the male voices in Angelina Ballerina, Nelson the Elephant, Reginald the Lion, Victor the Crocodile and the others in 64 Zoo Lane, Frank the Koala, Archie the Crocodile and Sammy the Shopkeeper in The Koala Brothers and Ol' Graham the Galleon, H.P. the Speedboat, Ken Toyn the Shipwright and Bryan the Ferry in Toot the Tiny Tugboat.

He also voiced Polluto in Tommy Zoom, the first in-house BBC animation production; The Professor, Pipsquawk, Trevor and Mr. Crumble in Frankenstein's Cat; and in 2009, contributed by voice to the Disney Channel's Jungle Junction, for Playhouse Disney and Spider Eye Productions.

Other cartoons which Wickham has done voice work for include Vampires, Pirates & Aliens, Tails and The Thousand Tasks, The Way Things Work, and The Octonauts, in which he plays both Professor Inkling and biologist Shellington. He has appeared in about 20 CD-ROM games, including Fable and Fable II, and voiced TV commercials. He appeared on stage as Kenneth Williams in Round the Horne Revisited.

Wickham also voiced Steff and Sariac from Pitt & Kantrop.

=== Other work ===
Wickham worked as an actor and writer on the radio series Bits from Last Week's Radio, recorded by Ear Drum productions for BBC Radio 1, as well as voicing Jack of Blades in the 2004 video game Fable.

He can be heard in the podcast The Offcuts Drawer as part of the cast.

In addition, he has done acting work for the company iHASCO, and demonstrates through some of their interactive training, on issues such as asbestos awareness bullying & harassment training, equality & diversity, health & safety in the workplace, and food allergy awareness.

==== Thomas & Friends – CGI version ====
From 2009 until 2021, Wickham provided the voices of various characters in the CGI series: Edward, Henry, Gordon, James, Percy, Whiff, Dash and Harold in the UK, and Harvey, Glynn, Skarloey, Sir Handel, Bert, Stafford, Salty, Den, Norman, Bertie, Captain, Sir Topham Hatt, Dowager Hatt in both the UK/US, among others.

In 2020, Wickham reprised his roles as Gordon and Sir Topham Hatt in Rainbow Sun Productions' 20th anniversary celebration reading of the film Thomas and the Magic Railroad.

== Radio restoration ==
Wickham has been involved in the audio restoration of archive BBC Radio comedy shows. He traced missing episodes of the series I'm Sorry, I'll Read That Again, which were repeated on BBC Radio 7, and restored episodes for broadcast.

== Voice roles ==
=== Film ===
Year	Title	Role	Notes
2001	Christmas Carol: The Movie	Mr. Leach and Undertaker	
2002	Return to Never Land	Schroder	
2002	The King's Beard	Additional voices	
2005	Angelina Ballerina: Angelina's Princess Dance	William Longtail and Mr. Maurice Mouseling	Direct-to-video
2006	Azur & Asmar: The Princes' Quest	Le Père	English version
2006	Angelina Ballerina: Angelina Sets Sail	William Longtail and Mr. Maurice Mouseling	
2006	The Jungle Book: Rikki-Tikki-Tavi to the Rescue	Bagheera	As part of the BKN Classic Series trilogy
2006	A Christmas Carol	Scrooge's Father, Jacob Marley, Collector of the Orphanage # 1, Ghost of Christmas Past and Ghost of Christmas Present	As part of the BKN Classic Series trilogy
2007	Alice in Wonderland: What's the Matter with Hatter?	Additional voices	As part of the BKN Classic Series trilogy
2007	The Three Musketeers: Saving the Crown		As part of the BKN Classic Series trilogy
2009	Thomas & Friends: Hero of the Rails	Edward, Henry, Gordon, James, Percy and the Fat Controller	UK voice; direct-to-DVD
2010	Thomas & Friends: Misty Island Rescue	Edward, Henry, Gordon, James, Percy, Whiff, Dash, Harold and the Fat Controller (UK) Salty and Captain	Direct-to-video
2010	Rainbow Magic: Return to Rainspell Island	Leonardo	
2011	Thomas & Friends: Day of the Diesels	Edward, Henry, Gordon, James, Percy and the Fat Controller (UK) Salty, Den, Paxton and Dowager Hatt	Direct-to-video
2012	Thomas & Friends: Blue Mountain Mystery	Edward, Henry, James, Percy the Fat Controller and the Thin Controller (UK) Skarloey and Sir Handel	Direct-to-video
2013	Thomas & Friends: King of the Railway	Edward, Henry, Gordon, James, Percy and the Fat Controller (UK) Skarloey	Direct-to-video
2013	Moshi Monsters: The Movie	Buster Bumblechops and Diavlo	
2014	Thomas & Friends: Tale of the Brave	Edward, Henry, Gordon, James, Percy and the Fat Controller (UK) Salty and a shunter	Direct-to-DVD
2015	Thomas & Friends: The Adventure Begins	Edward, Henry, Gordon and James (UK) Glynn, Sir Topham Hatt/The Fat Director, Gordon's driver, James's guard, the Knapford Station speaker, some workmen and some signalmen	Direct-to-DVD
2015	Thomas & Friends: Sodor's Legend of the Lost Treasure	Edward, Henry, Gordon, James and Percy (UK) Salty, Arlesdale Bert, Bertie, Sir Topham Hatt/The Fat Controller, a diver, some workmen and a policeman	Direct-to-DVD
2016	Thomas & Friends: The Great Race	Edward, Henry, Gordon and James (UK) Salty, Den, Norman, Stafford, Skarloey, Sir Handel, Arlesdale Bert and Sir Topham Hatt	Direct-to-DVD
2017	Thomas & Friends: Journey Beyond Sodor	Edward, Henry and Gordon (UK) Sir Topham Hatt	Direct-to-DVD
2018	Thomas & Friends: Big World! Big Adventures! The Movie	Edward, Henry, Gordon, Harold and the Thin Controller (UK) Bertie, Sir Topham Hatt, additional voices	Direct-to-DVD

=== Television ===
Year(s)	Title	Role	Notes
1998–2000	Archibald the Koala	Archduke	Alongside Richard Griffiths
1999–2000	64 Zoo Lane	Various (UK version)	52 episodes
2000–06	Cubeez	Bozz	Alongside Marc Silk and Tara Newley
2002–06	Angelina Ballerina	Mr. Mouseling, Grandpa Mouseling, William Longtail, Doctor Tuttle, various characters	Alongside Rob Rackstraw
2002	Wilf the Witch's Dog	Door, Sly	Alongside Kerry Shale
2003–06, 2014–16	Watch My Chops!	Corneil	Alongside Ben Small
2004–07	The Koala Brothers	Frank and Archie	Alongside Rob Rackstraw
2005	Pitt & Kantrop	Stef, Sariac, Vegas and Atlas	Alongside Emma Tate
2005–08	Planet Sketch		Alongside Morwenna Banks, John Sparkes and Bert Kwouk
2007	Tommy Zoom	Polluto and Bad Polluto Drawings	
2007–08	The Secret Show	Changed Daily	Alongside Rob Rackstraw
2008	Frankenstein's Cat	Trevor, Dr. Frankenstein, Mr. Crumble and Pipsquawk	Alongside Joe Pasquale
2008–09	The Mr. Men Show	Mr. Small and Mr. Tall	Alongside Teresa Gallagher, Steven Kynman, Rob Rackstraw and Tim Whitnall; UK voice role
2009–13	Jungle Junction	Bungo, Crocker and Dozer	Alongside Jimmy Hibbert
2009–21	Thomas & Friends	Edward, Henry, Gordon, Whiff, Dash, Harold and Mr. Percival (UK) The Fat Controller/Sir Topham Hatt (US; 2015 onwards / UK), Harvey, Glynn, Skarloey, Sir Handel, Arlesdale Bert, Stafford, Salty, Den, Norman, Bertie, Captain, Dowager Hatt and Lord Callan	Succeeded by Nigel Pilkington in the role of Percy (UK) and Rob Rackstraw in the role of James
2009	Bunny Maloney	Modchi	Alongside Walter Lewis
2010–present	The Octonauts	Shellington, Professor Inkling	Alongside Simon Greenall, Jo Wyatt, and Rob Rackstraw
2011–12	Fleabag Monkeyface	Dr. Dirk Spamflex	Alongside Bob Golding
2014–15	Toot the Tiny Tugboat	Ol' Graham the Galleon, H.P. the Speedboat, Ken Toyn the Shipwright, Bryan the Ferry	alongside John Hasler
2015–16	Wissper	Bert and Monty	Alongside India Chesher-Good
2019–21	Ricky Zoom	Hank Zoom	
2019	Thomas & Friends: Steam Team to the Rescue	Edward, Henry, Gordon, The Fat Controller/Sir Topham Hatt, Salty, Den, Captain and Norman (UK/US)	Television special
2020	Thomas & Friends: The Royal Engine	Henry, Gordon, The Fat Controller/Sir Topham Hatt, Dowager Hatt, Thomas' Crew and a Stationmaster (UK/US)	Television special
2020	Thomas & Friends: Marvelous Machinery	Edward, Gordon (UK) Harvey, Salty, Harold, Sir Topham Hatt, The Policeman, and the Station Master (UK/US)	Television miniseries

=== Video games ===
Year	Title	Role
1996	Privateer 2: The Darkening	Male Space Communications
1996	MindGym	The Narrator
1997	City of Lost Children	Additional voices
2004	Fable	Jack of Blades
2005	Dragon Quest VIII: Journey of the Cursed King	Dhoulmagus
2005	Shinobido: Way of the Ninja	Goh the Bear and Kenobi Ninja
2006	Medieval II: Total War	Additional voices
2007	Genji: Days of the Blade	Genji Warrior (Guard B), Heishi Warrior A and Yoritomo
2008	Dragon Quest Swords: The Masked Queen and the Tower of Mirrors	Colonel Cutlass, Briquet and a soldier
2008	Fable II	Additional voices
2008	Memento Mori	Additional voices
2009	Cursed Mountain	Edward Alexander Bennett
2013	The Night of the Rabbit	Garden Rabbit
2017	Xenoblade Chronicles 2	Niranira

Preceded by none	Voice of Edward (UK dub 2009–2021	Succeeded by Unknown
Preceded by none	Voice of Henry (UK dub); 2009–2021	Succeeded by Unknown
Preceded by none	Voice of Gordon (UK dub); 2009–2021	Succeeded by Neil Crone
Preceded by none	Voice of James (UK dub); 2009–2017	Succeeded by Rob Rackstraw
Preceded by none	Voice of Percy (UK dub); 2009–2015	Succeeded by Nigel Pilkington
