= Dyzio =

Dyzio can refer to:

- Dyzio, a model Dilophosaurus in the Geological Museum of the Polish Geological Institute in Warsaw
- Dyzio, a character from The Lingo Show, a kids' TV show
- The Polish name of Dewey Duck, a Walt Disney cartoon character
