= Thomas & Friends: Big World! Big Adventures! =

2018 British film

- Directed by: David Stoten
- Written by: Andrew Brenner
- Based on: Thomas & Friends by Britt Allcroft
- Produced by: Micaela Winter; Tracy Blagdon
- Starring: John Hasler (UK); Joseph May (US); Peter Andre; Yvonne Grundy; Keith Wickham
- Music by: Chris Renshaw
- Production company: Mattel Creations
- Distributed by: Mattel Creations
- Release date: July 20, 2018 (UK)
- Running time: 85 minutes
- Country: United Kingdom
- Language: English
- Box office: $3.2 million

Thomas & Friends: Big World! Big Adventures! is a 2018 British animated musical adventure film in the Thomas & Friends franchise. The fourteenth and final feature-length special in the Thomas & Friends television series, it follows Thomas the Tank Engine as he aims to become the first steam locomotive to fully travel around the world. John Hasler and Joseph May reprise their roles as Thomas in the British and American dubs respectively, while Peter Andre and Yvonne Grundy join the cast.

The film was announced in 2017 as part of Mattel's planned "big makeover" of the series, with the aforementioned company partnering with the United Nations to incorporate their Sustainable Development Goals into the film.

Thomas & Friends: Big World! Big Adventures! saw a limited theatrical release in the United Kingdom on July 20, 2018, receiving mainly negative reviews from critics and grossing US$3.2 million at the box office worldwide.

== Plot ==
Rally car Ace passes through Sodor on his way to a multi-continental race starting in Africa. He meets Thomas on his way and convinces him to tag along. Thomas consults Sir Topham Hatt, who inadvertently agrees when distracted by a telephone, and heads to the docks to be loaded onto Ace's ship.

Thomas and Ace arrive in Dakar, Senegal and head to the first race in the Sahara desert, only for Ace to abandon Thomas due to the lack of railway tracks. Thomas encounters a group of rolling stock who are hoping to be taken to Dar es Salaam. Thomas accepts the job, and his train becomes increasingly longer throughout the journey. Stopping at another train yard, Thomas meets Nia, who offers to help him. Thomas refuses, but Nia joins him regardless. Meanwhile, Hatt arrives in Senegal in search of Thomas and travels through the desert via camels.

Thomas and Nia arrive in Dar es Salaam and board a ship with Ace heading to Rio de Janeiro, while Hatt arrives in Dar es Salaam after they leave. The engines follow Ace through the Amazon rainforest with a train headed for San Francisco; Thomas denies Nia's request to refuel on water on the way. They find Ace having crashed and load him onto their train, only for Thomas to later run out of water. Nia suggests making a funnel out of leaves to refill Thomas' boiler with rain, which succeeds. Hatt arrives in Rio, learns from a diesel locomotive that Thomas is headed for San Francisco, and searches for him by plane.

Reaching the United States, Thomas, Nia, and Ace travel to Arizona. Ace convinces the two engines to race with two halves of the train, later additionally convincing Thomas to play a trick on Nia by diverging onto another track heading to his next race. They accidentally enter an abandoned mine and derail upon exiting, with an American steam engine named Beau arriving the following morning with numerous cowboys, cowgirls, and horses to help them back on the rails. Thomas thanks Beau and later arrives at the salt flats, dropping Ace off angrily and leaving to search for Nia. He finds out she is in China and is loaded onto a ship headed to the same location, feeling guilty and regretful on his way there.

In China, Thomas learns that Nia is headed to the Rainbow Mountains. He spots Nia atop a snowy cliff and tries to get her attention, but she ignores him. As Thomas apologises, Nia gets derailed by an avalanche and dangles over the edge of a cliff. Thomas attempts to rescue her alone, but almost fails until Yong Bao—a friend of Thomas from China—rescues them. After Nia is helped back onto the tracks, she and Thomas agree on returning to Sodor through Asia and Europe.

At the Vicarstown drawbridge between Sodor and the mainland, Nia explains that she has no shed at home to go back to, so Thomas invites her to come to Sodor with him. At Knapford Station, they are welcomed by all of the engines, workers, and Mr. Percival; the latter had been running the railway in Hatt's absence. However, they are confused as to why Hatt is not with them, with Thomas having been completely unaware he went to look for him. Meanwhile, an exhausted and seasick Sir Topham Hatt meets Ace on a ship headed to China.

== Voice cast ==
=== United Kingdom ===
- John Hasler as Thomas
- Keith Wickham as Edward, Henry, Gordon, Harold and the Thin Controller
- Rob Rackstraw as Toby
- Nigel Pilkington as Percy
- Teresa Gallagher as Emily
- Matt Wilkinson as Cranky

=== United States ===
- Joseph May as Thomas
- William Hope as Edward and Toby
- Kerry Shale as Henry, Gordon, Harold and Mr. Percival
- Christopher Ragland as Percy
- Jules de Jongh as Emily
- Glenn Wrage as Cranky

=== Both ===
- Peter Andre as Ace, an Australian rally car
- Yvonne Grundy as Nia, an orange tank engine from Kenya
- Keith Wickham as the Fat Controller, Bertie, Captain, and Dowager Hatt
- Rufus Jones as the Flying Scotsman, Gordon's brother from the United Kingdom
- Rob Rackstraw as James, Donald, Sam, Big Mickey, the Thin Clergyman, and the Senegal Race Announcer
- Steven Kynman as Duck, and Paxton
- Joe Mills as Douglas, and Oliver (uncredited)
- Kerry Shale as Diesel, and Beau
- Teresa Gallagher as Annie, Clarabel, Daisy, Marion, Natalie, Cassia, and an unnamed American Diesel Engine
- Tim Whitnall as Bill, Timothy, and a Moai Head
- Matt Wilkinson as Ben, Tony, and Carter
- Nicola Stapleton as Rosie
- Bob Golding as Sidney
- Rasmus Hardiker as Philip
- Lucy Montgomery as Carly, and the Cowgirls
- Dan Li as Yong Bao
- Rachael Miller as Angelique
- Gabriel Porras as Carlos, Fernando, Emerson, and the Brazilian Troublesome Trucks
- Su-Lin Looi as the Chinese Diesel Shunter
- Abubakar Salim as Kwaku, Kobe, and an African Troublesome Van
- Richie Campbell, Akiya Henry, Dona Adwera, and Chipo Chung as the African Troublesome Trucks
- David Menkin as an unnamed Rally Car, and the Cowboys
- Christopher Ragland as an unnamed Rally Car, and the Cowboys

== Reception ==
On the review aggregator website Rotten Tomatoes, 20% of 10 critics' reviews are positive, with an average rating of 4.20/10. Cath Clarke, writing for The Guardian, gave the film two out of five stars, stating that "the whole thing has a straight-to-DVD quality, or perhaps a TV episode padded out with a few limp songs", later adding that "the overhaul here seems sincere if a little strained, and the franchise deserves some points for unshackling Thomas from the yesteryear universe of creator the Rev Wilbert Awdry, a vicar and railway enthusiast. But the lazy gender stereotypes need to go." Ed Potten, writing for The Times, wrote that "the animation, story and dialogue all feel so pedestrian and, despite the globetrotting theme, parochial."
