= Bitz & Bob =

British-Canadian children's animated television series

- Created by: Daniel Bays
- Directed by: Kitty Taylor
- Theme music composer: Sanj Sen
- Opening theme: Work it Out
- Composer: Mick Cooke
- Countries of origin: United Kingdom; Canada
- Original language: English
- No. of seasons: 2
- No. of episodes: 44

Production
- Executive producers: Vanessa Amberleigh; Bob Higgins
- Producer: Barry Quinn
- Running time: 10 minutes
- Production companies: BBC Children's Productions (Note: Known as CBeebies Production for the first season.); FremantleMedia Kids & Family Entertainment (series 1); Jellyfish Pictures; Boat Rocker Media (series 2)

Original release
- Network: CBeebies
- Release: 12 March 2018 – 8 August 2020

Bitz & Bob is a children's animated television series that originally aired on CBeebies. The series focuses on the adventures of a sister and brother, who explore various concepts related to STEAM (Science, Technology, Engineering, Arts, and Mathematics) through imaginative play and problem-solving. Bitz & Bob is also avaliable on BBC iPlayer for over a year.

== Premise ==
The series centers on Bitz, an inventive and resourceful girl, and her younger brother Bob. Together, they embark on adventures in Craft City, a technologically advanced city where they utilize their STEAM skills to solve problems and overcome challenges.

== Characters ==
- Bitz (voiced by Dolly Heavey) is Bob's older sister who solves problems, builds, and fixes. She has a younger brother, Bob. Her catchphrase is: "Time for a Bitz brain blitz!"
- Bob (voiced by Duke Davis) is Bitz's younger brother. He is dressed as a robot/dinosaur made out of cardboard. He helps out Bitz to solve problems. His catchphrase is: "Bitz blitzed it!" and "Awesome!"
- Purl (voiced by Maria Darling) is a soft rag doll (she wears roller skates on some episodes) and Bitz's bestie. She is a perfectionist, and loves adding a touch of glitter on every project. Her catchphrase is "Oh my shiny sequins!"
- Bevel (voiced by Rob Delaney) is a cool monster-like action figure and power tool and is Bob's favourite toy. He is an ultimate action guy with a sensitive side, but not truly clever or brave. He speaks with an American accent, his catchphrase is "BOO-YAH!" which he says in every occasion.
- Zip and Pop (voiced by Marc Silk and Maria Darling respectively) are two slapstick-loving, practical-joking brother and sister zip-up cloth dolls. They can carry tools and mechanical stuff. In a clumsy, curious and comical double act, they find pretty much everything hilarious. Impulsive and impetuous, they do not like being alone, sitting still or being unzipped.

== Production ==
BBC and FremantleMedia produced the series along with Jellyfish Pictures.

After Boat Rocker Media acquired FremantleMedia's Kids and Family Division, they started producing it.

== Broadcast ==
The series aired on TVOKids and Knowledge Kids in Canada, EBS in South Korea, SVT in Sweden, NRK in Norway, YLE in Finland, Hop! Channel in Israel, KiKa in Germany, Nat Geo Kids in Latin America and Brazil, Kiwi TV in Hungary, Minimax and ČT :D in Czech, TVP ABC in Poland, BNT 2 in Bulgaria, France 5 in France, and GOOD TV in Taiwan. In some territories, it was offered to show it on Nick Jr. or Disney Junior. In Scotland, it was shown in BBC Alba and translated in Scottish Gaelic as Bitz agus Bob (similar to predecessor back in 2001).

== You Can Do it Too! ==
A complementary short-form live-action companion show, Bitz & Bob: You Can Do It Too!, offers viewers the opportunity to experiment with a related STEAM project at home.
