= Boblins =

- Genre: Children's television series
- Created by: Inspire GLG
- Developed by: Inspire GLG
- Starring: Maria Darling; Marc Silk
- Opening theme: Boblins, Boblins opening theme
- Ending theme: Boblins, Boblins closing theme
- Country of origin: United Kingdom
- Original language: English
- No. of seasons: 1
- No. of episodes: 78 (list of episodes)

Production
- Production location: United Kingdom
- Running time: 10 minutes

Original release
- Network: Broadcast Internationally Treehouse TV, DR1, TVNZ, ABC2, TiJi, Citv, TV2, TV4, MTV3, Canal Panda, RTVS
- Release: September 2006 – March 2008

Boblins is a British animated educational television series for preschool children produced by the British company InspireGLG Limited. The show, which runs in 10-minute segments, is broadcast internationally, being shown in the United Kingdom on CITV, in Canada by Treehouse TV, in Denmark by DR1, in New Zealand on TVNZ "Kidzone", and in Australia on ABC2. The show was picked up in 2006 for broadcasting in France by TiJi, the French children's network.

The show features seven bright, colorful characters who interact in a colourful land called Rainbow's End. Its purpose is to instruct children about basic facts of colour as well as nature and environment. The non-profit organization Young Media Australia indicates the show is most appropriate for children aged two to seven, combining unrealistic slapstick comedy with general and social education encouraging such traits as cooperation and persistence.

Executive producer for the series David Murray Griffiths was jailed in 2014 following a multimillion pound fraud scheme, of which Boblins was a part of.

== Characters ==
- Yam Yam- a friendly, cheerful, fun-loving yellow Boblin who loves bouncing up and down and can't resist pushing buttons when he's told not to which leads to trouble.
- Gully- a hard-working, gossiping green female Boblin who takes care of the animals in the farm.
- Ruddle- a red Boblin who is kept busy by building and fixing things and helps Pi build his inventions.
- Onny- an orange Boblin who is a motherly-type figure to the other Boblins, her hobbies are baking cakes.
- Pi- (named after the number pi) the most clever of the Boblins and is always building inventions (which can sometimes malfunction and cause trouble). Pi is purple, wears a pair of glasses and loves eating cupcakes.
- Pinny- a pink Boblin and the youngest of the group. She is cheerful, and her favorite hobby is painting.
- Bodkin- a blue, friendly and adventurous Boblin who is seen hiking, climbing up mountains, swinging on vines ectc.
