= Boj (TV series) =

Animated children's television series on CBeebies

- Genre: Adventure; Children
- Created by: Claire Underwood; Dave Ingham; David Hodgson
- Directed by: Claire Underwood
- Starring: Ziggy Badans; Jason Donovan; Josie Taylor; Angelo Illsley; Poppy Hodgson; Jack Gardner; Sophie Goldstein; Dan Chambers; Dave Benson Phillips; Dominica Warburton; Fatima Ptacek; Egnes Bevče; Mia Donovan; Caroline Shaw
- Composer: Mick Cooke
- Countries of origin: United Kingdom; Ireland
- Original language: English
- No. of series: 1
- No. of episodes: 50 (1 special)

Production
- Executive producers: Gary Timpson; Jon Rennie
- Producer: David Hodgson
- Editor: Paul Hibbs
- Running time: 11 minutes 22 minutes ("Adventure Camp")
- Production companies: Pesky Productions; Kavaleer Productions; Cloth Cat Animation

Original release
- Network: CBeebies (UK); RTÉjr (Ireland); S4C (Wales)
- Release: 19 May 2014 – 9 February 2015

Boj is an animated children's television series created by Claire Underwood, Dave Ingham, and David Hodgson for Pesky Productions. The series ran from 19 May 2014 to 9 February 2015 on CBeebies. The series centres on the adventures of a "boj-a-boom(ing)" young bilby named Boj and the rest of his gang as they spring into action in Giggly Park.

== Characters ==
- Boj (voiced by Ziggy Badans) is an anthropomorphic young blue bilby.
- Mimi (voiced by Josie Taylor) is Boj's mother.
- Pops (voiced by Jason Donovan) is Boj's father.
- Denzil Woof (voiced by Angelo Illsey) is a brown anthropomorphic dog.
- Ruby Woof (voiced by Caroline Shaw) is a female dog who owns Ruby's Diner and is Denzil’s mum.
- Dr. Bruce Woof (voiced by Dave Benson Phillips) is the local doctor and Denzil's dad.
- Gavin Bleat (voiced by Jack Gardner) is a yellow anthropomorphic goat.
- Blair Bleat (voiced by Dan Chambers) is an American goat who is a gadget enthusiast and Gavin's dad.
- Bonnie Bleat (voiced by Dominica Warburton) is Gavin's mum.
- Mia Twitch (voiced by Sophie Goldsteinin) is a white anthropomorphic mouse.
- Julie Twitch (voiced by Dominica Warburton) is Mia's single mum.
- The Twitchlets (voiced by Claire Underwood) are Mia's five little brothers known as Davis and Julie.
- Rupa Nibblit (voiced by Poppy Hodgson) is an anthropomorphic rabbit.
- Deepak Nibblit (voiced by Omar Khan) is Rupa's dad.
- Geeta Nibblit (voiced by Kuchi Braaso) is Rupa's mum.
- Mr Clive Cloppity (voiced by Dan Chambers) is a Scottish anthropomorphic horse who is the groundskeeper of Giggly Park. His first name is "Clive", as revealed in the 22-minute special "Adventure Camp".
- Ms Claire Clippity (voiced by Dominica Warburton) is an anthropomorphic horse and a friend of Mr. Cloppity's who appears in "Adventure Camp".
- Hoj (voiced by Samuel Dyson), is an anthropomorphic bilby and Boj's cousin. He appears in "Adventure Camp".
- Bibi (voiced by Maria Darling) is an anthropomorphic bilby, she is Boj's aunt and Hoj's mom. She appears in "Adventure Camp".

== Episodes ==
No. overall	No. in series	Title	Written by	Storyboard by	Original release date
1	1	"Boj the Collector"	Ben Ward	Krystal Georgiou	19 May 2014
Boj makes a collection of four of them guys can share.
2	2	"Musical Mayhem"	Dave Ingham	Pete Western	20 May 2014
When Denzil breaks his guitar, Boj fixes his ideas to come up with a new plan of a homemade one-man band.
3	3	"Hoppy Birthday"	Lisa Akhurst	Trevor Ricketts	21 May 2014
Boj helps Mia choose something special for Rupa's birthday party and his friends come to visit in Rupa's house.
4	4	"Under the Giggly Moon"	Dave Ingham	Trevor Ricketts	22 May 2014
A father-son Giggly Park camping trip and Boj saves the day, before they end up in chaotic Bleats' Camperzoom 2000 motor home goes awry.
5	5	"In the Hothouse"	Ben Ward	Krystal Georgiou	23 May 2014
Mia and Rupa are disagree over to help Mr. Cloppity water the plants in his hothouse, Boj invents a game and the hose breaks loose.
6	6	"Let's Get Rummaging"	Lisa Akhurst	Paul Stone	26 May 2014
Mrs Bleat's rummage sale to raise money, Pops and Mimi are misunderstanding that amazing things can trust, much to Boj's idea.
7	7	"Giggly Holiday"	Lisa Akhurst	Trevor Ricketts	27 May 2014
8	8	"Flat as a Pancake"	Davey Moore	Paul Stone	28 May 2014
9	9	"Giggly Rink"	Dave Ingham	Mike Coles	29 May 2014
10	10	"Bouncing Boj"	Sean Carson	Trevor Ricketts	30 May 2014
11	11	"High Flying Drying"	Davey Moore	Trevor Ricketts	2 June 2014
12	12	"Non-stop Pops"	Sean Carson	David Young	3 June 2014
13	13	"The Sleep Under"	Sean Carson	Paul Stone	4 June 2014
14	14	"Song for Mimi"	Sean Carson	Mike Coles	5 June 2014
15	15	"Rainbow for Rupa"	Dave Ingham	David Young	6 June 2014
Boj shows Rupa and her family a homemade approach to decorate a playroom with using colored chalk across Rupa's walls.
16	16	"Sneezy Snufferoos"	Neil and Annie Richards	Paul Stone	9 June 2014
17	17	"Starfishing"	Lisa Akhurst	Trevor Ricketts	10 June 2014
18	18	"The Best Nest"	Dave Ingham	Mike Coles	11 June 2014
19	19	"Robot Recycler"	Ben Ward	Mike Coles	12 June 2014
20	20	"Carry on Carrot"	Neil and Annie Richards	Paul Stone	13 June 2014
21	21	"Mia's Pet"	Dave Ingham	Paul Stone	6 October 2014
22	22	"Giggly Park Rescue Squad"	Sean Carson	Mike Coles	7 October 2014
23	23	"The Amazing Cloppity"	Dave Ingham	Krystal Georgiou	8 October 2014
24	24	"The Big-Big Bike Ride"	Sean Carson	Mike Coles	9 October 2014
25	25	"Denzil's Lost Teddy"	Neil and Annie Richards	Mike Coles	10 October 2014
26	26	"Boj and the Booms"	Dave Ingham	Paul Stone	13 October 2014
27	27	"Watch the Birdie"	Sean Carson	Trevor Ricketts	14 October 2014
28	28	"Keeping Mr. Cloppity"	Sean Carson	Mike Coles	15 October 2014
29	29	"Puppet Show"	Lisa Akhurst	Trevor Ricketts	16 October 2014
30	30	"The Peace Prize"	Sean Carson	Paul Stone	17 October 2014
31	31	"The Duckling"	Lisa Akhurst	Krystal Georgiou	20 October 2014
32	32	"Picnic in the Park"	Dave Ingham	Mike Coles	21 October 2014
33	33	"Fun and Games"	Lisa Akhurst	Paul Stone	22 October 2014
34	34	"Still as Statues"	Lisa Akhurst	Krystal Georgiou	23 October 2014
35	35	"Sports G'Day"	Dave Ingham	Paul Stone	24 October 2014
36	36	"Gavin's Got Talent"	Sean Carson	Krystal Georgiou	27 October 2014
37	37	"The Giggly Park Express"	Sean Carson	Mike Coles	28 October 2014
38	38	"Picky Eater"	Ben Ward	Krystal Georgiou	29 October 2014
39	39	"The Giggly Dig"	Dave Ingham	Trevor Ricketts	30 October 2014
40	40	"Pops's Outback Trek"	Lisa Akhurst	David Young	31 October 2014
41 42	41 42	"Adventure Camp"	Dave Ingham	Mike Coles	26 January 2015
Mr. Cloppity and his new anthropomorphic animal friends are trekking with an adventure camp.
43	43	"Doctor Denzil"	Sean Carson	Krystal Georgiou	27 January 2015
44	44	"Happy Harvesters"	Dave Ingham	Mike Coles	28 January 2015
45	45	"Buzzy Boj"	Dave Ingham	Krystal Georgiou	29 January 2015
46	46	"Bedtime for Rupa"	Dave Ingham	Paul Stone	30 January 2015
47	47	"Blast Off Buddies"	Lisa Akhurst	Paul Stone	2 February 2015
48	48	"Boj-a-balloon"	Sean Carson	Mike Coles	3 February 2015
49	49	"Out of the Box"	Dave Ingham	Paul Stone	4 February 2015
50	50	"Double Cloppity"	Lisa Akhurst	Krystal Georgiou	5 February 2015
51	51	"Sploshy Fun"	Dave Ingham	Mike Coles	6 February 2015
Denzil and Rupa both fail to win their swimming skills. Boj encourages his friends to get a new badge for being a good swimmer.
52	52	"Keep on Going"	Dave Ingham	Krystal Georgiou	9 February 2015
Boj, Rupa, and Gavin are trekking for their Ranger survival badges and they can go back on track.

== Home release ==
Title	Episodes	Release date
Boj: Blast Off Buddies	Blast Off Buddies; Hoppy Birthday; Flat as a Pancake; Carry On Carrot; Giggly Park Rescue Squad; The Giggly Dig; Denzil's Lost Teddy; Boj the Collector; Sneezy Snufferoos; Keep On Going	18 May 2015
Boj: Giggly Holiday	Giggly Holiday; Picnic in the Park; Let's Get Rummaging; Pops Outback Trek; The Peace Prize; The Duckling; Boj-a-Balloon; The Sleep Under; Keeping Mr Cloppity	13 July 2015
Boj: Happy Harvesters	Happy Harvesters; Out of the Box; Boj-a-Balloon; Sploshy Fun; Pops' Outback Trek; Keeping Mr Cloppity; Doctor Denzil; Starfishing; Picky Eater; Adventure Camp	18 September 2015
