= Maria Darling =

British voice actress

- Citizenship: United Kingdom
- Occupation: Actress
- Years active: 1994–present

Maria Darling is a British voice actress who has provided many character voices for children's television programmes in the United Kingdom and the United States. She is known for voicing Dizzy and Roley in the US version of Bob the Builder.

== Television and film ==
- Dr Otter – Some of the Rabbit Children, Mrs. Canny Body, and additional voices
- Fifi and the Flowertots – Violet, Pip, Poppy, and Webby
- The Magic Key – Chip, additional voices
- Rubbadubbers – Amelia, Sploshy, and Winona
- Boj – Bibi
- Driver Dan's Story Train – Select female characters
- Roary the Racing Car – Roary, Marsha, Cici/Zizzy, Breeze, Mamma Mia
- Franny's Feet – Franny (UK dub)
- Bob the Builder – Dizzy, Roley (US dub)
- Miss Spider's Sunny Patch Friends – Miss Spider, Dragon, Snowdrop, Pansy, Shimmer, Betty, Eunice (UK dub)
- The Backyardigans – Tyrone, Tasha (Series 1–2) (UK dub)
- Pitt and Kantrop – Pitt
- Watership Down – Pipkin, Hannah, Clover, additional voices (Series 3 only)
- Boblins – Pinny, Gully and Onny
- Odd Jobbers – Mia and Menic the goat
- Mole Sisters – All character voices in the programme
- Zoo Troop – Anxious the Elephant and Polly
- The Koala Brothers (audiobooks) – Narrator
- Wide-Eye – Little Hoot, Hetty Hornet, The Natterjack Toads, Conchita, and Batwing
- Muffin The Mule (2005 version) – All of the female characters except for Louise the Lamb
- PB Bear and Friends – Millie the Monkey
- Guess with Jess – Billie
- Professor Layton and the Eternal Diva – Luke Triton, Annie Dretche
- Chuggington – Vee, Lori (Series 1–5)
- Jelly Jamm – Goomo
- Cartoonito – Cuba, Lolly, Ringo (2006–2018)
- Bimble's Bucket – Narrator, additional voices (1997–1998)
- Bitz & Bob – voices of Purl and Pop
- Gordon the Garden Gnome – Rosie
- Tad, The Lost Explorer – Young Tad Stones
- Rudi and Trudi – Additional voices
- The King's Beard – Sophie
- Little Robots – Rusty and Noisy (US dub)

== Video games ==
- Ape Escape 3 – Aki, Sayaka (UK version)
- Everybody's Golf: World Tour – Bonnie
- Everybody's Golf Portable 2 – Gloria, Mia Cara, Frau Ada
- Everybody's Tennis Portable – Gloria, Natasha
- Dragon Quest VIII: Journey of the Cursed King
- Kingdom o' Magic
- Medieval II: Total War
- PC Play & Learn – All voices
- PlayStation All-Stars Battle Royale – Charu
- Professor Layton Series – Luke Triton (UK dub)
- Overlord 2
- Inazuma Eleven – Mark Evans
- Inazuma Eleven 2 – Mark Evans
- Inazuma Eleven 3 – Mark Evans
- Inazuma Eleven Strikers – Mark Evans
- The Secret World – Lilith

== Other ==
In 2002, she guest starred in the Bernice Summerfield audio drama The Green-Eyed Monsters.
