= Rebecca Elgar =

English children's book illustrator and writer

Rebecca Elgar (born in Lincoln) is an English children's book illustrator and writer. She is best known as the creator of the pre-school children's TV series Driver Dan's Story Train. She also created the original designs for the series Boo! and illustrated some spinoff books.

Both Driver Dan's Story Train and Boo! were shown on CBeebies. Driver Dan's Story Train is currently being shown by CBeebies, PBS Kids Sprout and ABC2. The TV series Boo! was nominated for a BAFTA.

In an interview with the BBC Elgar said that "bringing a love of books and reading to young children" was one of her aims when she created Driver Dan's Story Train.

After gaining a degree in graphic design at Norwich School of Art she started in publishing as a book designer, and worked on Playdays magazine, before concentrating on illustrating her own books.

Some of her published credits are: the Driver Dan series (2011), the Where's Boo! series (2004), Where's my Dinner? (2003), Time for Bed (2003), Is that an elephant over there? (1995), Shhh everyone's sleeping (1996), and the popular Jack books including Jack: It's a sunny day! (1999), Jack: It's a rainy day (1999), Jack: It's playtime (1998), Jack: It's bedtime (1998).

Her current projects include 'charming little picture', a range of printed toys and original illustrations.
