= Tommy Zoom =

- Genre: Family; Animation; Live action Superhero
- Voices of: Keith Wickham; Jerome Flynn; Elliot Belshaw; Nick Mercer
- Narrated by: Jerome Flynn
- Opening theme: "Tommy Zoom"
- Ending theme: "Tommy Zoom" (Instrumental)
- Country of origin: United Kingdom
- No. of seasons: 1
- No. of episodes: 30

Production
- Running time: 9 minutes
- Production company: BBC In-House Children's Production (Note: Animation production by Alternative View Studios.)

Original release
- Network: CBeebies
- Release: 19 March 2007 – 28 March 2008

Tommy Zoom is a British children's animated superhero television series that was shown regularly on CBeebies in the UK. It was first aired on 19 March 2007.

== Synopsis ==
The series focuses on a boy named Tommy, who lives with his parents, his baby brother Sam, and his pet dog Daniel at a house by the name of 17 Verdant Avenue. Each episode begins and ends with a live action sequence, narrated by Daniel, in which Tommy is faced with a dilemma of various kinds. Daniel will pose the question, "What should Tommy do? What would Tommy Zoom do?" The show then switches to animation to show Tommy's animated superhero alter-ego Tommy Zoom foiling a plot by Polluto, which has some link to whatever problem the real Tommy currently faces. After saving the world "in a zoom", the live-action element is reintroduced, and Tommy is seen to make the right choices and solve whatever problem he has.

== Characters ==
- Tommy Zoom (voiced by Elliot Belshaw, portrayed by Nathaniel Gleed in live-action) is a young superhero, complete with a cape and a large Z imprinted on his chest. In live-action, he causes problems around the house that he has to resolve. He doesn't speak in the live-action portions.
- Daniel the Hound (voiced by Jerome Flynn, portrayed by Molson in live-action) is Tommy's dog and sidekick, who often discovers the problem. In live-action, he is the narrator, where his thoughts on the situation are translated into spoken dialogue, and he occasionally barks.
- Polluto (voiced by Keith Wickham) is a light blue imp or alien with rotten teeth. He is a villain who aims to ruin the world by removing all greenery and polluting watercourses with chemicals. He wears a smart purple suit.
- Smogg (voiced by Nick Mercer) is a lazy black cat who is Polluto's sidekick. Smogg's whiskers are bent and he has a huge, cheeky smile.

=== Other characters ===
These all appear in the live-action segments. None of them speak.

- Mum (played by Joanne Criss) is sometimes seen walking around the house.
- Dad (played by Richard Moody) is sometimes seen walking around the house.
- Baby Sam (played by Noah Liddell and Sam Liddell) is sometimes seen eating at the table. He occasionally makes laughing or crying sounds, which are stock sound effects.
- Girl on Bike (played by Charlotte Murphy) – Appears in the episode "Confidence" where she rides her bike with Tommy.

== Episodes ==
=== Series 1 (2007–2008) ===
No. in series	Title	Directed by	Written by	Original release date
1	"Water, Water"	Unknown	Jimmy Hibbert	19 March 2007
Tommy must stop Polluto from draining all of the world's reservoirs.
2	"Graffiti"	Unknown	Dave Ingham	20 March 2007
Polluto covers the world in slime and pins Tommy down to a fence. How will he save the day?
3	"Supergranulator"	Unknown	Shelia Hyde	21 March 2007
After eating from Polluto's "Bottomless Bucket", Tommy has no energy left to stop Polluto from turning all the world's food into sweets.
4	"I Don't Want a Shower"	Unknown	Max Allen	22 March 2007
Polluto covers the whole city in mud, and Tommy must find a way to stop him.
5	"Caged"	Unknown	Ian Carney	23 March 2007
Tommy and Daniel become the zoo's main attraction, while trying to stop Polluto from caging every animal in the galaxy.
6	"Bring Me Sunshine"	Unknown	Carl Gorham	26 March 2007
Polluto blocks out the sun, meaning Tommy must save the day again.
7	"Stop the Rot"	Unknown	Dave Ingham	27 March 2007
Tommy comes to the rescue when Polluto steals the world's compost.
8	"Food Fight"	Unknown	Max Allen	28 March 2007
Tommy unknowingly helps Polluto in his latest plan to waste all the world's food.
9	"Steel Thunder"	Unknown	Dave Ingham	29 March 2007
A new superhero named Steel Thunder keeps taking credit for Tommy's saves, causing Tommy to lose confidence. Daniel must save the day.
10	"No Sleep"	Unknown	Jimmy Hibbert	30 March 2007
A sleep-deprived Tommy must stop Polluto's latest plan to poison the world's oceans.
11	"Monsta Mega Mucky Trucky"	Unknown	Dave Ingham	2 April 2007
Tommy helps Polluto pollute the planet by driving his new monster trucks.
12	"Paper"	Unknown	Carl Gorham	3 April 2007
Polluto steals the world's paper supply, but Tommy and Daniel get the last laugh.
13	"The Mark of Polluto"	Unknown	Shelia Hyde	4 April 2007
Polluto plans to destroy the world's plant life with a combine-harvester-like machine called the "snipatron".
14	"Imagination"	Unknown	Max Allen	5 April 2007
Polluto steals Tommy's imagination, in his newest plan to remake the world in his image.
15	"Doggytron"	Unknown	Shelia Hyde	6 April 2007
Tommy abandons Daniel to play with a robot called Doggytron, walking straight into a trap set up by Polluto.
16	"Boyz Noise"	Unknown	Dave Ingham	10 March 2008
Tommy gets a chance to play with his favourite band "Purple Pollution", unaware it's another of Polluto's plans.
17	"Winning and Losing"	Unknown	Carl Gorham	11 March 2008
Tommy's bad temper helps Polluto to destroy the world's plant life.
18	"Clean Up"	Unknown	Ian Carney	12 March 2008
While at the beach, Tommy unknowingly helps Polluto with his new plan to trash the world.
19	"Electricity"	Unknown	Jimmy Hibbert	13 March 2008
Polluto turns on all the world's electrical devices to choke the world with pollution.
20	"Capngrab"	Unknown	Shelia Hyde	14 March 2008
Tommy abandons Daniel to go treasure hunting, which is all part of Polluto's newest plan.
21	"Framed"	Unknown	Ian Carney	17 March 2008
Polluto and Smogg disguise themselves as Tommy and Daniel and let then take the blame for their crimes.
22	"Washing Hands"	Unknown	Jimmy Hibbert	18 March 2008
Polluto uses Tommy to create an army of giant "Super-Germs" to infect the world.
23	"Finders Keepers"	Unknown	Ian Carney	19 March 2008
Tommy must get everyone's stuff back when Polluto steals it to become rich.
24	"Gridlock"	Unknown	Jimmy Hibbert	20 March 2008
Polluto puts the whole city in a traffic jam, creating mountains of pollution.
25	"Helping Others"	Unknown	Carl Gorham	21 March 2008
While trying to help some aliens clean up their planet, Tommy keeps leaving to attend parties, organised by Polluto.
26	"Losing Things"	Unknown	Max Allen	24 March 2008
Tommy loses Daniel, and must find him before Polluto's newest device is ready to pop.
27	"Space Junk"	Unknown	Dave Ingham	25 March 2008
Tommy must save Daniel from Polluto when Polluto plans to fill space with rubbish.
28	"Confidence"	Unknown	Max Allen	26 March 2008
When Polluto steals Tommy's cape, Tommy loses his confidence. Now Daniel must bring Tommy back to save the world.
29	"Cover Up"	Unknown	Ian Carney	27 March 2008
Tommy must use precautions to help him stop Polluto's magnifying glass from burning the planet.
30	"Aromathon"	Unknown	Steve Cannon	28 March 2008
Tommy's bad breath becomes the key to Polluto's newest plan. Only by brushing his teeth can Tommy save the day.
