= Marc Silk =

British voice actor

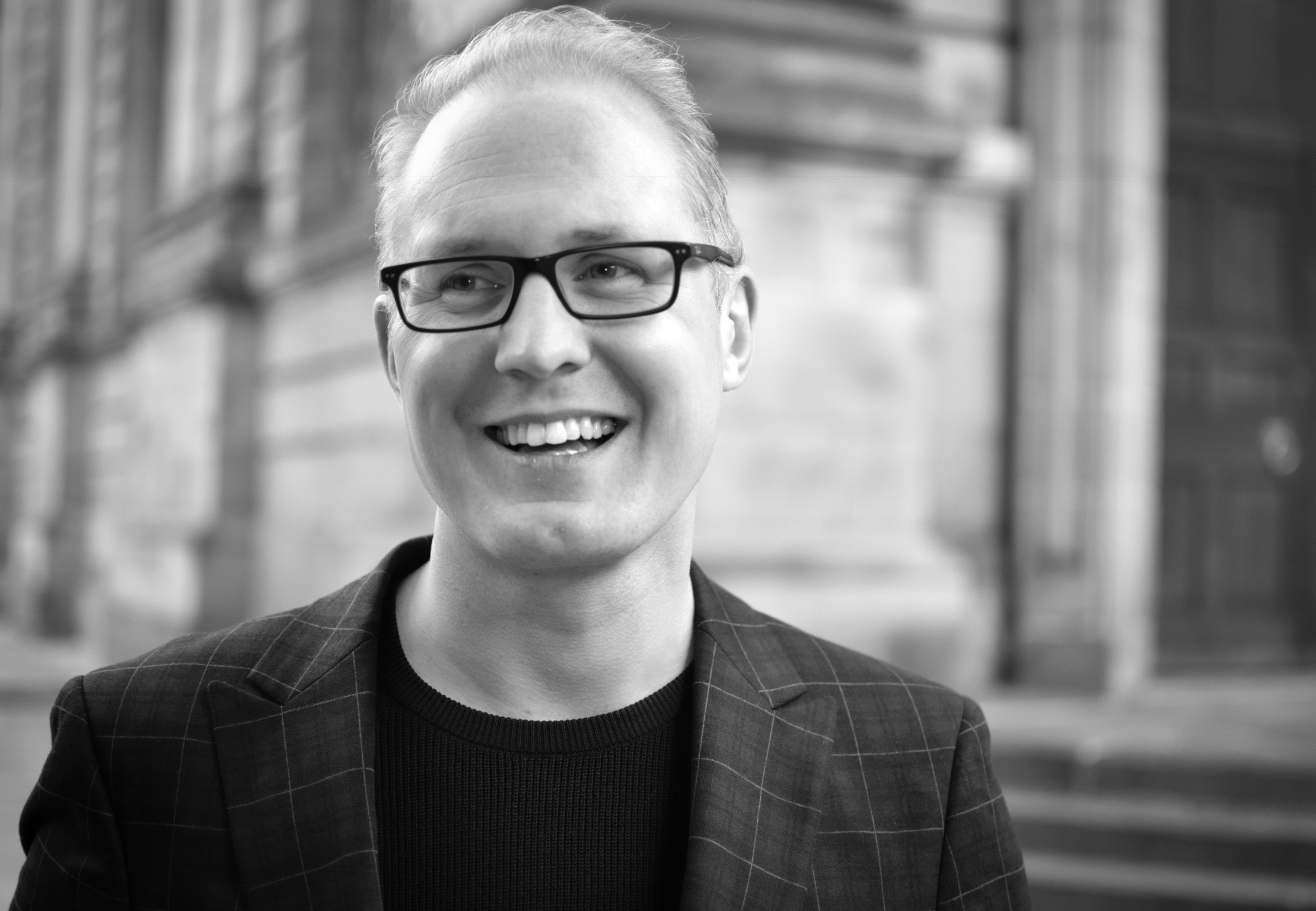
- Silk in 2015
- Born: 14 September 1972 (age 54)
- Other name: Mark Silk
- Occupation: Voice actor
- Years active: 1996–present
- Notable work: Star Wars: Episode I – The Phantom Menace; Danger Mouse; Go Jetters; The Pingu Show; Strange Hill High; Bob the Builder (US & Canada); Roary the Racing Car; The Lingo Show; Overlord; Black & White; Chip the Wolf; Fifi and the Flowertots
- Website: marcsilk.com

Marc Silk (born 14 September 1972) is a British voice actor.

== Career ==
During his school years, Silk was a quiet student who was aspiring for creativity. He presented a mock radio show for his media course, in which he performed an "unusual mix" of his heroes, interests and influences. The show caught attention from the mainstream media, with BBC Radio 4 building a feature on it.

Many years later, Silk became a radio producer, practising his skills at home. He hosted a radio show in Coventry, directing other voice actors for promotions and doing sketches. He was offered a job by BBC Radio 1, but he turned it down since he was nervous and was still learning. He did part-time work at BRMB, and his father Reg Silk (5 June 1939 – 18 November 2005), who was disabled and wore an artificial leg, would appear in Treasure Island as Charlton Heston's stunt double.

In 1996, Silk founded his own company, named The Production Pit, to start working as a voice actor. He cites Jim Henson, Frank Oz, Mel Blanc, June Foray, Don Messick (whom he met at the age of 12 in 1985), Daws Butler, Kenny Everett, Freddie Mercury, Aretha Franklin, Brian Cant, David Graham, Monty Python, George Lucas, and his parents as his influences. (Note: Attributed to multiple references:) In 1998, he was asked to present live continuity on CITV, filling in for Steve Ryde, and also did voiceovers for promotions for the Disney Channel (at Teddington Studios) and Cartoon Network. He was also brought onto Radio 1 Breakfast to perform the voice of Scooby-Doo.

In 1999, Silk was hired by George Lucas to provide the voices of Tey How and Aks Moe in Star Wars: Episode I – The Phantom Menace, recording them at Abbey Road Studios. Being a fan of Star Wars, Silk considered his work with Lucas "a genuine honour". From 2000 to 2001, he voiced Johnny Bravo in bumpers for Cartoon Network, when Johnny "hosted" the "Toon FM" programming block on the channel, along with Brak from Space Ghost Coast to Coast, voiced by Dan Russell. He also provided the voices of Scooby and Shaggy Rogers in bumpers aired on Cartoon Network, CITV and Boomerang. Silk's character vocal work also includes Chicken Run, the US voice of Bob and several other characters in Bob the Builder, The Pingu Show, The Lingo Show, Strange Hill High, the 2015 reboot of Danger Mouse, and Go Jetters.

In 2003, Silk started doing voiceovers for FM104 in Dublin. Since 2015, he is the host of Symphonic Star Wars at the Royal Albert Hall. He is also a supporter of The Brain Tumour Charity.

== Filmography ==
=== Film ===
- Star Wars: Episode I – The Phantom Menace (1999) – Tey How, Aks Moe (voices)
- Chicken Run (2000) – Chickens
- Sindy: The Fairy Princess (2003) – Prince Hugo
- Pulp (2013) – Solly Feldman

=== Animation ===
- CITV – Announcer, Sylvester the Cat, Scooby-Doo, Shaggy Rogers
- Cartoon Network – Droopy, Bugs Bunny, Daffy Duck, Sylvester the Cat, Yosemite Sam, Foghorn Leghorn, Yogi Bear, Dick Dastardly, Fred Flintstone, Barney Rubble, Johnny Bravo, Scooby-Doo, Shaggy Rogers
- Rocky and the Dodos (1998-1999) – Rocky, Bill
- Living with Lionel (2000) – Lionel
- Cubeez (2000-2001) – Learning Wall (season 1), Boingles, Wiggywams, Eyesanozes, Artist the Paintbrush, Tok Tok, additional voices
- Albie (2001-2004) – Spike, various voices
- The Inbreds (2002) – Jesus
- Pigeon Boy (2004) – Various voices
- Fifi and the Flowertots (2005-2010) – Bumble/Fuzzbuzz, Slugsy (UK/US dubs)
- Legend of the Dragon (2005-2008) – Victor, Xuan Chi
- Pitt & Kantrop (2005) – Prosper, Mandas
- Adventurers: Masters of Time (2005-2006) – @
- The Pingu Show (2006-2007) – Narrator
- Zorro: Generation Z (2006) – Packer
- Boblins (2006-2008) – Yam Yam, Bodkin, Ruddle, Pi
- Roary the Racing Car (2007-2010) – Maxi, Drifter/Dragga, Hellie, Nick, Copter Keith, Flash/Furz, Dinkie (UK/US dubs)
- Zoo Troop (2007) – Bradley Bear
- Bob the Builder (2007-2011) – Bob, Mr. Beasley, Bristle (US dub)
- Chop Socky Chooks (2008) – Various voices
- Dork Hunters from Outer Space (2008) – Additional voices
- Odd Jobbers (2008) – Bitz, Bob, Osimo
- The Official BBC Children in Need Medley (2009) – Flash, Bumble, Slugsy, Brains, Aloysius Parker
- The Lingo Show (2012-2014) – Lingo
- Tickety Toc (2012-2016) – McCoggins (US dub)
- Strange Hill High (2013-2014) – Tyson, Matthews, Mr Garden, Nimrod, additional voices
- Danger Mouse (2015) – Nero, Headless Postman, Robot Dog, Little Boy, Professors, additional voices
- Go Jetters (2015-2020) – Grandmaster Glitch, Grimbots
- Boomerang (2015-2020) – Scooby-Doo, Shaggy Rogers
- Zack and Quack (2016) – Additional voices
- Everybody Loves a Moose (2016) – Moose
- Aliens Love Underpants And... (2017) – Pod, Bloover
- Shane the Chef (2018) – Sam Spratt
- Bitz & Bob (2018-2020) – Zip
- Kit and Pup (2018-2020) – Kit, Pup
- Lego City (2018-2019) – Various voices
- Thunderbirds Are Go (2018-2020) – Captain Wayne Rigby, additional voices
- Star Corps: Defenders of the Solar System (2018) – The Commander, Wiz, Rom Terabyte
- Dr Panda (2019) – Hoopa
- Milo (2021-2022) – Commander Cottentail, Chef Pierre, additional voices
- The Crack (2021) – Gregg
- Corpse Talk (2022) – Additional voices
- Ollie and Friends (2022) – Narrator, Giant Elder Guardian, Raid
- Stingray: Deadly Uprising (2024-2025) – Troy Tempest, Dirk Dune, Elium, Admiral
- Lego City Mini Movies (2024) – Various voices
- Fugglers (2025) – Various voices
- Happy Town (2025) – Pep, Tabitha, Leon, Dockie, Tallulah, Gordy, Ren, Romy, Lia, Lupin, Tilly, Sol, Ella, Nina, additional voices
- 7 Bears (2025) – Big Bad Wolf

=== Vocal coach ===
- Share A Story (2013) – multiple BAFTA award-winning production (CITV)

=== Shorts ===
- This Way Up (2008) – Undertaker (Academy Award-nominated)
- Don't Fear Death (2013) – Various voices
- Globbert (2013) – Globbert, Narrator
- A Christmas Panic! (2013) – Various voices (English version)
- At-issue (2016) – Bartholomew Yogart
- The Imposter (2020) – Brutus the Robot
- Stingray: Deadly Concerto (2024) – Troy Tempest

=== Television shows ===
- Name That Toon! (1996-1997) – Announcer
- Tricky (1997) – Narrator
- Ant & Dec's Saturday Night Takeaway (2003) – Announcer
- An Audience with Neil Diamond (2008) – Announcer
- It'll Be Alright on the Night (2008) – Announcer
- Britain's Got the Pop Factor... and Possibly a New Celebrity Jesus Christ Soapstar Superstar Strictly on Ice (2008) – Martin Wallace
- We Are Most Amused: Prince Charles' 60th Birthday (2008) – Announcer
- Popstar to Operastar (2010-2011) – Announcer
- A Comedy Roast (2010-2011) – Announcer
- An Audience with Barry Manilow (2011) – Announcer
- Lonely Robots in Space (2020) – Brutus the Robot and Higgins
- Sister Boniface Mysteries (2023-2024) – BBC Journalist, Newsreader, Zybok, First Advert (voices)
- The Masked Singer (2023) – Sorting Hat
- The Royal Variety Show – Announcer
- British Comedy Awards – Announcer
- The Paul O'Grady Show – Announcer
- Got to Dance – Announcer
- You've Been Framed – Announcer
- Dancing on Ice – Announcer
- Disney Channel - Promo Announcer

=== Documentaries ===
- Destroy All Monsters! (2011) – Narrator
- IMC Needs You! (2011) – Narrator

=== Video games ===
- Fighters Destiny (1998) – Fighting D.J.
- Gex 3: Deep Cover Gecko (1999) – Alfred
- Silver (1999) – Chiaro
- 40 Winks (1999) – NiteKap, Threadbear, Robot Ruff
- Imperium Galactica II: Alliances (1999) – Various voices (English version)
- Micro Maniacs (2000) – All voices
- MediEvil 2 (2000) – Sir Daniel Fortesque, Lord Palethorn, Winston Chapelmount
- Hogs of War (2000) – Monty, Ponsonby, Jones, Gerard, M. Chien, Cochon, Goinfre, Glouton, Huski, Jetski, Snowski, Pesski, Muski, Rimski, Kendo, Kung Fu, Ninja, Sushi, Kempo, Tenko, Wolfie, Lederhos, Herr Gel, Schnitzel, Schwein, all nine Americans
- Chicken Run (2000) – Rocky, Nick
- Black & White (2001) – Good Conscience, Evil Conscience, Creature Guide, Khazar, Lethys, Male Villagers
- Tom and Jerry in War of the Whiskers (2002) – Narrator, Tom Cat, Butch, Spike, Eagle, Lion, Robot Cat, Monster Jerry
- Ape Escape 2 (2003) – Specter, White Monkey (UK version)
- Rocket Mania! (2003) – Sparky
- Gladiator: Sword of Vengeance (2003) – Spartoi-Champions, The Forgotten/The Lost
- Future Tactics: The Uprising (2004) – Various voices
- The Mummy (2005) – Various voices
- Sacred Underworld (2005) – Various voices (English version)
- Rising Kingdoms (2005) – Various voices
- Ape Escape Academy (2005) – Specter, White Monkey (UK version)
- Everybody's Golf Portable (2005) – Rio, C.J., Logan (UK version)
- Battalion Wars (2005) – Legion Grunt
- Black & White 2 (2005) – Various voices
- Ape Escape: On the Loose (2006) – Spike, Specter, Jake/Buzz, White Monkey (UK version)
- Dragon Quest VIII (2006) – Additional voices (English version)
- Ape Escape 3 (2006) – Specter, White Monkey (UK version)
- Overlord (2007) – Gnarl, Minions, Various
- Everybody's Golf Portable 2 (2008) – Rio, C.J., Logan (UK version)
- Buzz! Master Quiz (2008)
- Scene It?: Doctor Who (2008)
- Overlord II (2009) – Gnarl
- Squeeballs Party (2009) – Various voices
- TV Superstars (2010)
- LittleBigPlanet 2 (2011) – Superman
- LittleBigPlanet PS Vita (2012) – Superman
- PlayStation All-Stars Battle Royale (2012) – Spike, Specter, Narrator (Sir Daniel Fortesque), Nick, Help Gargoyles
- F1 Race Stars (2012) – Various voices
- DmC: Devil May Cry (2013) – Additional voices
- Strange Hill High: Merchant of Menace (2014) – Matthews
- Lego Ninjago: Shadow of Ronin (2015) – Various voices
- F1 2016 (2016) – Various voices
- Total War: Warhammer (2016) – Various voices
- Micro Machines World Series (2017) – Chief A. Blaze, Cobra H.I.S.S., Captain Smallbeard
- Xenoblade Chronicles 2 (2017) – Soosoo (English version)
- Rogue Aces (2018) – Captain, Male Pilot, Baron, Narrator
- Two Point Hospital (2018) – Ricky Hawthorne, Sir Nigel Bickleworth, Harrison Wolff
- Shadows: Awakening (2018) – Morphew, Akram, Marib, Tesset, Shakkik, Piker, Famulus, Sutler, Gorgog, Silk Wardens, Guards, Merchants, Tennok Plushfur, Greyclaws, Surka, Red Smoke Sura, Renegade Sura
- Hood: Outlaws & Legends (2021) – Guard
- Two Point Campus (2022) – Ricky Hawthorne, Sir Nigel Bickleworth, Harrison Wolff, Rodrick Cushion
- Two Point Museum (2025) – Ricky Hawthorne, Sir Nigel Bickleworth, Harrison Wolff

=== Pinball ===
- Teenage Mutant Ninja Turtles (2020) – Splinter, Bebop and Rocksteady, Baxter Stockman, Casey Jones
- FunHouse: Rudy's Nightmare (2021) – Rudy
- Whirlwind: Total Chaos (2023) – Narrator
- Labyrinth (2023) – Goblins, various voices
- Portal (2025) – Reggie
- Harry Potter (2025) – Callouts

=== Live shows ===
- Titan the Robot (2011–present)

=== Theme park attractions ===
- Bob the Builder 4D (2009) – Bob (Legoland Windsor Resort)
- In The Night Garden Magical Boat Ride (2014) – Narrator (Alton Towers)
- Go Jetters Vroomster Zoom Ride (2017) – Grandmaster Glitch, Grimbots (Alton Towers)
- Monorail – Announcer (Alton Towers)
- Paultons Park – Character voices
- Drayton Manor Resort
- Haunted House Monster Party (2019) – Lord Vampyre (Legoland Windsor Resort)
- Duplo Dino Coaster (2020) – Duplo Dino (Legoland Windsor Resort)

=== Toys ===
- Harry Potter (2007-2024) – Sorting Hat

=== Television commercials ===
- Doctor Who – Various UK ads
- Kellogg's Cartoon Network Toon Tags – Voice of Johnny Bravo
- Cookie Crisp – Voice of Chip the Wolf
- Coco Pops – Voice of Coco the Monkey
- Bounce Bounce Tigger – Voice of Tigger – Disney toy commercial / Ravensburger
- Hoppin' Hunnypots Game – Voice of Tigger – Disney toy commercial / Character
- Screwball Scramble – Tomy
- Pop-up Pirate – Tomy
- Orange – Mobile phone national TV campaign
- New Super Mario Bros. Wii
- Peter Kay - The Sound of Laughter – US movie trailer voice
- Ben 10: Ultimate Alien – Cosmic Destruction
- Scooby-Doo: Mystery Mansion – Voice of Scooby-Doo and Shaggy Rogers
- Scooby-Doo: Rumble & Roll – Voice of Shaggy Rogers
- Coronation Street – Cadbury and Harveys sponsorships
- Walt Disney World (Magic Kingdom / EPCOT / Animal Kingdom / Disney Studios)
- Stuntman Stu – Character

=== Discography ===
- "I'm Gonna Be (500 Miles)" (2007) – Himself (music video)
- "The Official BBC Children in Need Medley" (2009) – Flash, Bumble, Slugsy, Brains, Aloysius Parker

=== Audiobooks ===
- In the Night Garden...: The Bedtime Book (2016) – Narrator
- Danger Mouse: License to Chill (2016) – Danger Mouse, Ernest Penfold, Colonel K, Stiletto, additional voices
- Anderson Audio Adventures: Stingray (2022) – Troy Tempest
- Fireball XL5: Cloud of a Billion Lights (2022) – Steve Zodiac, Teng-Dit
- Doctor Who: Peake Season (2022) – Mortimer Seepgood, Clark

=== Radio ===
- BRMB (1989-1998) – Library filer
- Radio 1 Breakfast (1998) – Scooby-Doo
- The Stephen Nolan Show – BBC Radio Ulster
- FM104 (2003–present) – Station voiceover
