= Driver Dan's Story Train =

British-Emirati animated children's television series

- Genre: Children's television series
- Created by: Rebecca Elgar
- Voices of: Patrick Monahan; Maria Darling; Alex Kelly; Peter Serafinowicz
- Countries of origin: United Kingdom; United Arab Emirates
- Original languages: English; Arabic

Production
- Production companies: Two Four 54; 3Line Media

Original release
- Network: CBeebies (United Kingdom); Al Jazeera Children's Channel (MENA)
- Release: 9 January 2010 – 15 August 2012

Driver Dan's Story Train (Arabic: كابتن كريم وقطار الحكايات, Captain Karim Qitar Al Hekayat (Captain Karim and the Story Train)) is a children's television series created and designed by Rebecca Elgar and is a co-production between Two Four 54 in the United Arab Emirates and 3Line Media in the United Kingdom. It marked the first CGI animated/live-action property to be produced in both English and Arabic, which each have its own separate versions of the program.

The series debuted on CBeebies and Al Jazeera Children's Channel on 9 January 2010. It was shown by Sprout, CBeebies, and ABC2.

== Content ==
The characters in the series are all plush toys, except for Milly and Lilly, who are paper cutouts of flamingo-like birds, The Vrooms, who are two small egg-shaped vehicles, and the Counting Sheep, who are cubical bricks painted to represent sheep. Each character, or pair of characters (except for Driver Dan and Twinkle) has their own train carriage which can be hitched to the Story Train. The audience (sometimes seen as several children, but usually represented by the camera's viewpoint and a child's voice) are sometimes asked for their opinion or choice on matters arising.

During the opening titles of each episode, a group of real children sit on a scatter of cushions. This scene disappears as a book opens, showing a pop-up model of a railway train with an engine and two carriages: steam locomotive, stores, a flatbed carrying story books. This is the Story Train. It quickly changes into a solid train, which is driven about, usually passing a character (or a pair or set of characters) without interacting, and later, during the episode, meets and interacts with other characters.

The first time that the Story Train meets a character that it will interact with, the camera shows only part of the character, and the audience is asked to guess which character it is.

Those characters then get into their vehicles carriages, which the train then hitches on (always three of those vehicles) and tows them to Story Corner.

At Story Corner, Twinkle flies ahead and lands on a huge book and pulls at a bookmark in it. The book opens, showing blank pages; a scatter of cushions falls out of the book onto the floor. The Story Train stops and its passengers get out and sit on the cushions or stand about. Driver Dan reads a story from a book, usually a book from the book flatbed, and says "Now show me the story." The real children then reappear and act out bits of the story, then disappear. The train then sets off again, shrinks to its original 3 vehicles, and quickly becomes a flat model and folds away and disappears. The real children reappear and walk offstage. Each episode lasts about ten minutes.

Those characters then get into their vehicles carriages, which the train then hitches on (always nine vehicles carriages) and tows them to Swirly Curly Hill.

The majority of the characters talk in English (or Arabic), but some (marked in [square brackets]) only make a characteristic noise, which other characters can interpret as speech.

== Characters ==
Name	Description	Voiced by (UK)	Voiced by (US)
Driver Dan	An anthropomorphic lion who drives the train: has a tool (multipurpose and somewhat like Doctor Who's sonic screwdriver) that lets him repair any malfunctioning vehicles.	Peter Serafinowicz	Train frontman Patrick Monahan
Twinkle	A red flying bird that usually rides on the engine's funnel, or flies ahead as a spotter. It is usually [twittering], and occasionally is found crowing.		
The Counting Sheep	5 cubical bricks with pictures of sheep on, and on the upper surface a pattern of 1, 2, 3, 4 or 5 dots in order of descending brick size. They can move and jump about, and stack themselves. [Bleating]		
Milly and Lily	Two slender paper cutout birds who are somewhat like flamingos.	Maria Darling	
Sweetie	A panda who is fond of nature and is quiet.	Alex Kelly	
Loopy	A stegosaurus-like dinosaur who wears glasses and is fond of jumping; his trampoline has 6 wheels and folds to become his carriage.	Maria Darling	
Hip (male) & Hop (female)	Two rabbits; Hip is mostly brown with some white and wears a blue backpack, Hop has the same pattern but with the colors exchanged and mirror-imaged and wears a red backpack.	Alex Kelly and Maria Darling	
Precious	A one-humped camel with a decorated harness.	Maria Darling	
The Vrooms (Red Vroom & Green Vroom)	Two egg-shaped vehicles, each with a bumper all round and one big wheel and two small wheels. They each have a detachable helicopter rotor to fly with. One episode (33. Puddle Muddle) shows each of them with a detachable bulldozer blade. One episode shows one of them with a detachable backhole to dig a hole for a pond. They have a two-level carriage for themselves and their accessories. At least sometimes, their carriage has a crane to fit and remove their detachable accessories.	[Vocal engine noises by David Yapp and Mark Taylor, and motor horn noises]	
Tallulah	An elephant who is always on a wheeled carriage, which is hitched directly to the Story Train.	Maria Darling	

== Episodes ==
- Series 1 has 52 episodes and a special.
- Series 2 has 50 episodes and a half-hour special. It started in Britain on BBC Two , and on CBeebies at 5.30 pm Mondays to Fridays; it has another character (Bippity, a stylized blue humanoid robot); he has his own carriage which can be hitched to the Story Train. There is extra scenery, representing a patch of dense jungle. In the start sequence, a group of several of the story characters is seen, not merely one. Episode 1 of this series was about the Story Train coming across Bippity and meeting him. 15 of its episodes have been shown in Britain so far: are: A new friend, The Great Hipini, Playing together, Loopy in space, The boomerang, You're the best, Jelly, Counting crazy, Bouncing better, Noisy story, Sheepy shenanigans, Super Loopy, The big and special Precious show, Follow Hop's Clues, Sweetie's garden. Each episode runs 11 minutes. The show was directed by Mark Taylor and produced by Teresa Reed.

== Awards ==
The Driver Dan website won the 2012 Prix jeunesse "up to 6 years" interactivity award. It was created by Plug In Media with animation by A Productions Ltd.

The season two special episode won the 2013 Kidscreen award in New York, having previously been nominated in 2012 for the pre-school category.
