= Get Squiggling =

- Genre: Children's
- Created by: Jo Killingley
- Directed by: Adrian Hedley
- Voices of: Janet James; John Hasler; Teresa Gallagher
- Country of origin: United Kingdom
- Original language: English
- No. of series: 2
- No. of episodes: 50

Production
- Executive producers: Jo Killingley (series producer); Tracy Nampala (producer); Sarah Colclough (for CBeebies)
- Running time: 15 minutes
- Production company: Dot To Dot Productions

Original release
- Network: CBeebies
- Release: 11 February 2008 – 30 July 2010

Get Squiggling is a British children's television series created and produced by Jo Killingley at Dot To Dot Productions, directed by Adrian Hedley, and broadcast on CBeebies and BBC Two in the UK.

== Format ==
The programme begins with a theme song. The lead character is Squiglet, a monster who speaks directly to the audience. The programme itself teaches preschool-aged children how to draw, as well as basic colours and shapes. The audience is encouraged to use drawing as a method of triggering imagination and as a means to progress the story. Each episode begins with him against a plain white background, which is gradually filled by the characters that he draws, like animals, objects, and landscapes, using his squiggle sticks and Squiggle Pad. There are seven different lines (loopy, round, straight, curved, bumpy, wavy and zig-zag) that Squiglet uses to draw. The main character is then animated by Squiglet saying the magic words, "One, two, three, four, five! Let's make our squiggles come alive!" and they join the story. All other content in the show is animated based on his drawings. If the main character encounters a problem, Squiglet draws an object to help them solve the problem. If a problem cannot be solved, the Squiggle Pad gives them a clue to the problem with a short, live-action video. While most episodes end with a song related to the episode, summing up the preceding story, some episodes starting with "Spaceman" end with an epilogue that what happened to the episode, summing up the same preceding story as before. Each episode ends with Squiglet saying "Thanks for all your squiggles. It's time to go now, but come back to Get Squiggling soon! Keep on squiggling!" and everybody says "Bye!" before the end credits start to roll over.

== Cast ==
John Hasler as all male characters.

Teresa Gallagher as all female characters.

Janet James as Squiglet.

== Development ==
The series originated from a simple squiggle Jo Killingley drew while on a beach in Cornwall, which inspired the concept of a preschool programme centred on drawing and imagination. The project was commissioned by CBeebies controller Michael Carrington in November 2006 and was developed under the working title Scribble It before being renamed Get Squiggling!.

The series was produced in association with animation studio Blue Zoo, combining live-action with animation. Episodes were storyboarded before filming, with the character Squiglet performed against a green screen and composited into animated environments during post-production. The production team carried out extensive tests on costume design and filming techniques to ensure the felt-covered character could be integrated convincingly into the animated world.

Educational consultant Brian Neish worked with the production team to develop the programme's drawing-based learning objectives. Each episode focused on a different type of line, such as straight, curved, loopy or zigzag, encouraging preschool viewers to practise basic drawing skills as the story unfolded. During filming at Enfys Studios in Cardiff, director Adrian Hedley devised practical methods to help body suit artist Samantha Dodd interact with animated characters that would be added later in post-production.

One of the programme's principal technical challenges was creating the illusion of drawings appearing in real time. Blue Zoo achieved this by filming oversized crayons tracing pre-drawn pencil lines on tracing paper before digitally animating the artwork. Principal photography concluded in May 2007, with post-production continuing until the series premiered on CBeebies on 11 February 2008.

== Episodes ==
=== Series 1 (2008) ===
Episode	Title	Aired
1	"Snowman"	11 February 2008
2	"Pirate"	12 February 2008
3	"Caterpillar"	13 February 2008
4	"Hippo"	14 February 2008
5	"Spider"	15 February 2008
6	"Hedgehog"	18 February 2008
7	"Three Little Pigs"	19 February 2008
8	"Spaceman"	20 February 2008
9	"Lamb"	21 February 2008
10	"Knight"	22 February 2008
11	"Photographer"	25 February 2008
12	"Cowboy"	26 February 2008
13	"Bloodhound"	27 February 2008
14	"Monster"	28 February 2008
15	"Fairy"	29 February 2008
16	"Elephant"	3 March 2008
17	"Scarecrow"	4 March 2008
18	"Tortoise & Hare"	5 March 2008
19	"Giant"	6 March 2008
20	"Crab"	7 March 2008
21	"Robot"	10 March 2008
22	"Frog Prince"	11 March 2008
23	"Hyena"	12 March 2008
24	"Bee"	13 March 2008
25	"Penguin"	14 March 2008

=== Series 2 (2010) ===
Episode	Title	Aired
1	"Monkey"	14 June 2010
2	"Cinderella"	15 June 2010
3	"Troll"	16 June 2010
4	"Mouse"	17 June 2010
5	"Old Mother Hubbard"	18 June 2010
6	"Cow"	21 June 2010
7	"Dinosaur"	22 June 2010
8	"Cat"	23 June 2010
9	"Gnome"	24 June 2010
10	"Magician"	25 June 2010
11	"Bat"	28 June 2010
12	"Squirrel"	29 June 2010
13	"Polar Bear"	30 June 2010
14	"Wizard"	1 July 2010
15	"Chef"	2 July 2010
16	"Ostrich"	19 July 2010
17	"Rhino"	20 July 2010
18	"Humpty Dumpty"	21 July 2010
19	"Old King Cole"	22 July 2010
20	"Koala"	23 July 2010
21	"Goldilocks"	26 July 2010
22	"Jack and the Beanstalk"	27 July 2010
23	"Magpie"	28 July 2010
24	"Rapunzel"	29 July 2010
25	"Kangaroo"	30 July 2010

== Get Squiggling Letters ==
On 7 February 2013 CBeebies commissioned a 26-episode spin-off to the series that focused on the letters of the alphabet. As with the original, Beyond Distribution handled worldwide distribution to the spin-off.

== Home media releases ==
BBC Worldwide (2 Entertain) originally intended to release DVDs of the series in the United Kingdom, as hinted through a promo video featuring footage from the show, but the distributor never did any.

Abbey Home Media released a DVD in February 2011 called "Animal Magic", which includes many animal-related episodes, with six from the second series and three from the first series.
