= Toot the Tiny Tugboat =

- Genre: Preschool animated series
- Based on: Toot and Pop! by Sebastien Braun
- Written by: Ian Carney; Andrew Bernhardt; Jo Clegg; Alison Gentleman; Stuart Kenworthy; Moya O’Shea; Paul Parkes; Kate Scott
- Directed by: Matthew Hood
- Starring: Osian Gatehouse; John Hasler; Menna Spittle; Emma Tate; Keith Wickham; Duncan Wisbey; Seema Bowri
- Composers: Ben Lee-Delisle; Paul Kissaun
- Country of origin: United Kingdom
- Original language: English
- No. of seasons: 1
- No. of episodes: 52

Production
- Executive producer: Jon Rennie
- Producers: Camilla Deakin; Ruth Fielding
- Production location: Animated in Cardiff
- Editor: Garry Smith
- Running time: 11 mins
- Production companies: Toot Enterprises; Cloth Cat Animation; Lupus Films; Boom! Kids

Original release
- Network: Milkshake!
- Release: 20 October 2014 – 2015

Toot the Tiny Tugboat is a British children's animated television series developed from Sebastien Braun’s Toot and Pop! picture book by Lupus Films and animated by Cloth Cat Animation. The series has been airing on Channel 5 Milkshake! since October 2014, and started showing on the 9 am time slot from October 2015. Additionally, the series broadcasts on the Cartoonito channel, with the Welsh language version airing on S4C Cyw. The series is also available on Netflix.

The show follows the nautical adventures of a young tugboat called Toot as he helps out with jobs around the harbour, with episodes involving themes such as taking responsibility, respecting wildlife, being a good friend, helping those in need, working in a team and believing in yourself. The large cast of characters includes other boats, seaside animals, harbourside workers, the Harbour Master and his twin grandchildren Bethan and Caleb.

Toot's catchphrase is "Heave-ho, let's go!"

== Broadcast ==
Country	Local Title	Channel	Release Date
United Kingdom	Toot the Tiny Tugboat	Channel 5 Milkshake!	20 October 2014
Wales	Tŵt Anturiaethau'r bad bach	S4C Cyw	21 October 2014
United Kingdom	Toot the Tiny Tugboat	Cartoonito	2 March 2015
United Kingdom	Toot the Tiny Tugboat	Netflix	1 August 2015
United Kingdom	Toot the Tiny Tugboat	Tiny Pop	TBA
Finland	Ruli	Yle TV2	1 November 2024
France	Toot les Tiny Tugboat	Piwi+	TBA
Germany	Toot die Tiny Tugboat	Super RTL	TBA
Italy	Tut il piccolo rimorchiatore	Rai Yoyo	2025
Spain	Toot las Tiny Tugboat	Clan	TBA
Ireland	Toot the Tiny Tugboat	RTÉjr	October 21, 2024
Poland	Toot Tiny Tugboat	MiniMini+	TBA
Canada	Toot the Tiny Tugboat	Toon-A-Vision	June 18, 2018
Australia	Toot the Tiny Tugboat	ABC Kids	TBA
United Kingdom	Toot the Tiny Tugboat	CBeebies	January 6, 2024

== Merchandise ==
=== Books ===
The series was developed from an original picture book by Sebastien Braun called Toot and Pop!.

=== Apps ===
The first official Toot app, Toot’s Harbour, was created by Thud Media and released in the Apple iOS App Store in March 2015. The open-world exploration game allows pre-school players to sail Toot around the Harbour in 3D, meeting friends, playing mini-games, towing boats and collecting rewards along the way. Toot's Race was the second and last, where you play as Toot, racing around the harbour, overtaking others.

== Cinema ==
Toot the Tiny Tugboat has been screened at Picturehouse Cinemas around the UK as part of Toddler Time, a cinema experience specially designed for very young children and their families.

== Awards ==
Year	Award	Category	Result
2015	BAFTA Cymru Games and Interactive Awards	Sound and Music Commendation	Winner
2015	Cairo International Cinema and Arts Festival for Children	Best TV Series	Bronze

== Festivals ==
Country	Festival	Year
United States	Animation Block Party	2015
United States	Kaleidoscope Kids TV International Film Festival	2015
Italy	Cartoons on the Bay - International Panorama of Cartoons on the Bay	2015
