= T-Bag =

British children's television series (1985–1992)

- Genre: Children's television
- Written by: Lee Pressman; Grant Cathro
- Directed by: Leon Thau; Glyn Edwards; Neville Green
- Starring: Elizabeth Estensen; Georgina Hale; John Hasler; Kellie Bright; Denise Coffey; Jim Norton
- Music by: Terry Trower
- Country of origin: United Kingdom
- Original language: English
- No. of series: 9
- No. of episodes: 94

Production
- Executive producer: Marjorie Sigley
- Producers: Charles Warren; Leon Thau
- Production location: Teddington Studios
- Camera setup: Multi-camera
- Running time: 20-25 minutes
- Production company: Thames Television

Original release
- Network: ITV
- Release: April 4, 1985 – November 17, 1992

T-Bag is a British children's television series created and written by Lee Pressman and Grant Cathro. It stars Elizabeth Estensen and Georgina Hale as the eponymous, tea-drinking sorceress, and John Hasler as her assistant, T-Shirt. The supporting cast includes Kellie Bright, Jim Norton and Denise Coffey. Produced by Thames Television for ITV, the series premiered on 4 April, 1985 as part of the CITV programming block, and concluded on 17 November, 1992, with 94 episodes broadcast over nine series.

== Plot ==
The sisters obtain magical powers by drinking tea made from the 'High T-Plant'. They are incapable of brewing it properly, requiring an assistant (T-Shirt) to do it for them. In return, T-Bag shares her magical powers with T-Shirt (Thomas Shirt), played by John Hasler. He started as a small child and grew until he towered above Hale by the series end in 1992. T-Shirt is presented as T-Bag's constant companion, part harassed surrogate son, part household servant. T-Bag and T-Shirt's magical powers mostly consist of conjuring objects out of thin air when needed, sending objects elsewhere and teleporting across time and space. T-Bag triggers her teleport ability by clicking her fingers. T-Shirt finds finger clicking too difficult and blinks instead. Although T-Shirt was T-Bag's assistant, he did not share in her evil ways, and though sometimes he appeared to be faithfully serving T-Bag, he was overall a hero, not a villain, and would ultimately side with the child heroine of the story.

Each series (apart from the last) followed a similar format, T-Bag (after reuniting with T-Shirt, either through grovelling or putting him under her power) would attempt to increase her power and there would only be one thing that could stop her. The components that made the item work would be scattered across time and space, and the girl of the series was required to travel and collect them all before T-Bag could get her hands on any of them. Debbie Carter, played by Jennie Stallwood, was the heroine of the first three series. Diana Barrand took over for the fourth as child television presenter Holly Anna Jones. Kellie Bright, who later appeared in The Upper Hand, The Archers and EastEnders, played Sally Simpkins in series five and six, plus a Christmas special. In T-Bag and the Rings of Olympus, the heroine is the Goddess Athena's handmaiden, Polyzena, or Polly, played by Natalie Wood. In T-Bag and the Sunstones of Montezuma, archaeologist's daughter, heroine Penny Hunt was played by Evelyn Sweeney. Typically, each episode also features two non-regular cast members to enliven the story.

Each episode has a different setting in which a magical item is hidden. These are often historical settings or settings from folklore or literature, such as ancient Egypt, ancient Rome, Renaissance Italy and Elizabethan England, Tom Sawyer's American South, Robin Hood's Sherwood Forest or a French Foreign Legion station in North Africa which owes something to Beau Geste. Historical figures such as Napoleon, Leonardo da Vinci or Queen Elizabeth I make guest appearances. Each episode would usually contain two guests stars (an exception to this was Wonders in Letterland, as Jim Norton appeared in each episode playing a different role), with an anchor character who appeared in the first and last episode to send the girl on her quest.

Towards the end of each series, T-Bag and T-Shirt would inevitably have a huge argument and she would take his magic from him (except in Turn on to T-Bag, which turned out to be her downfall) before kicking him out. He would then team up with the girl, and the final episode would usually show T-Bag stealing the collected items back and being within striking distance of victory only to be thwarted at the last second and apparently destroyed, although this was usually temporary.

Tallulah Bag (Estensen) was finally destroyed for good in the last episode of T-Bag and the Revenge of the T-Set and replaced by her sister Tabatha Bag. Although their roles as the villain remained the same, with T-Shirt still by her side, the two characters were quite different. Whereas Tallulah would attempt to keep calm and composed often in attempts to impress people, Tabatha was prone to being over-dramatic and lost her temper. The departure of Tallulah and arrival of Tabatha also caused a role reversal in regards to T-Shirt, as he became more competent and level-headed against her silliness and tendency to rush into situations (to the point that, in Pearls of Wisdom, he was able to successfully deliver one of the titular pearls to T-Bag on two occasions, only for her to immediately lose it both times - not that it stopped her inevitably blaming him for her failure). One common trait was that although both Tallulah and Tabatha spent most of the series as comic relief, both would become very menacing when needed (usually in the last episode).

The final series, Take Off With T-Bag, broke the mould the previous series had set and was based on a story recently released in the book The Amazing Adventures of T-Bag, where T-Bag was the protagonist who had to collect items herself; previously the role of the juvenile female lead. This final series saw her travelling in a spaceship with both T-Shirt (who was willingly working for her now) and a new character named Tow Ling Shirt; T-Shirt's Chinese cousin. She spent the series collecting golden envelopes which were leading to her birthday surprise. In the final episode of the series, she found that she had been on a wild goose chase while Granny Bag set up a surprise party for her during the distraction. T-Bag, in a rare show of heart, declared that the greatest gift of all was friendship just before she had her birthday cake splattered all over her.

== Production ==
The programme was first broadcast on 4 April 1985. The show was originally intended to be educational; however, this aspect was dropped after the first series in favour of simple adventure plots.

From 1985 to 1989, Tallulah Bag was played by Elizabeth Estensen. In 1990, Estensen left the show and Tallulah Bag was replaced by her sister Tabatha Bag, played by Georgina Hale. She played the role until the series ended in 1992.

The series ended due to Thames Television losing its franchise. The series writers were expecting T-Bag to be picked up by what became Carlton Television and began plot ideas for a potential tenth season, but Carlton instead picked up Mike and Angelo.

== Series ==
Title	Year of broadcast	Series on IMDb
Wonders in Letterland	4 April-6 June 1985	
T-Bag Strikes Again	27 August-29 October 1986	
T-Bag Bounces Back	23 January-27 March 1987	
Turn on to T-Bag	5 January-8 March 1988	
T-Bag's Christmas Cracker	27 December 1988	
T-Bag and the Revenge of the T-Set	3 January-7 March 1989	
T-Bag's Christmas Carol	26 December 1989	
T-Bag and the Pearls of Wisdom	2 January-6 March 1990	
T-Bag's Christmas Ding Dong	26 December 1990	
T-Bag and the Rings of Olympus	7 January-11 March 1991	
T-Bag's Christmas Turkey	26 December 1991	
T-Bag and the Sunstones of Montezuma	6 January-9 March 1992	
Take Off with T-Bag	8 September-17 November 1992	

=== DVD ===
A new DVD, T-Bag: The Reunion Documentary, featuring interviews with principal cast and crew members was released on 17 September 2007, through UK based company Fantom Films. In December 2008 it was broadcast on Film24. In May 2010, Revelation Films announced plans to release the series on DVD. As of autumn 2013, only the first 3 series have been made available by Revelation and there have not been any further DVD releases. The first series was released on 8 November 2010, the second on 24 January 2011, and the third on 2 May 2011.

== Reception ==
The Guardian described the show as "...time travel drama somewhere between Doctor Who and Blackadder".
