= Screwball Scramble =

Toy made by Tomy

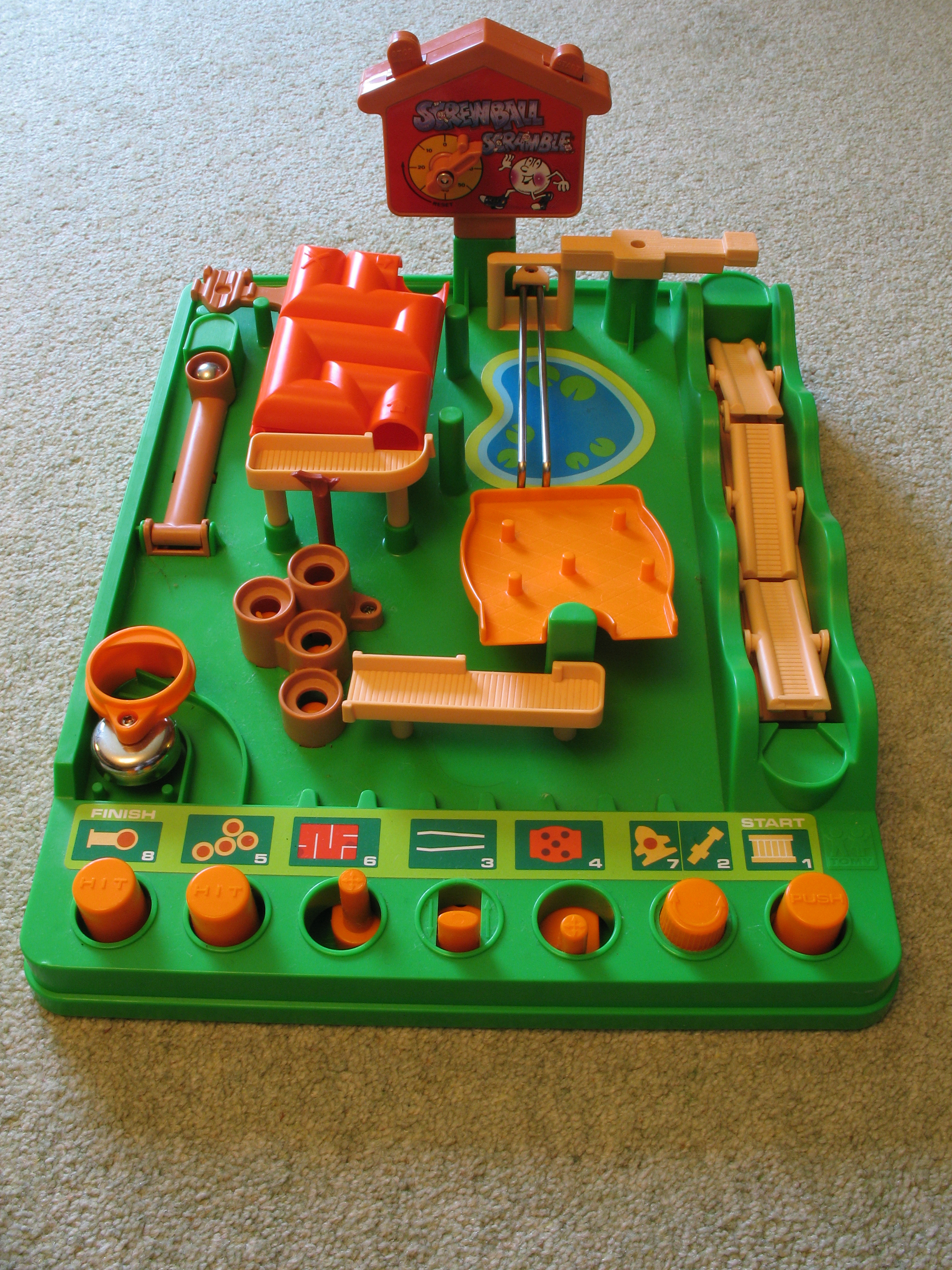
- Type: Labyrinth
- Company: Tomy
- Availability: 1979–present
- Materials: Plastic
- Official website

Screwball Scramble is a game made by Tomy that involves guiding a 14-millimeter-diameter chrome steel ball bearing around an obstacle course. It is known in Japan under the name Lit. "Athletic Land Game" (アスレチックランドゲーム). A player guides the ball by using various buttons, dials and levers that affect parts of the course. If a mistake is made a player must start again. The aim of the game is to complete the course as fast as possible. It takes no batteries and is recommended for children five and above. The toy was popular during the 1980s, and remains available.

Outside Japan, the game was originally known as "Run Yourself Ragged", then later "Snafu: The Maze Game That Runs You Ragged", "Crazy Maze", "Tricky Golf", and other names. The device was cloned in the Soviet Union as "Кто быстрее" (Kto bystree - "Who is faster").

== Parts of the course ==
- The first part of the course is the tilting walkway; by pressing a button the player must tilt the parts of the walkway in order to rock the ball across and place it on the platform at the end.
- By turning a dial the player must pick the ball up from the platform using the magnetic crane and deposit it on the parallel bars.
- The parallel bars are two metal rods on which the ball sits. By moving these rods apart with a lever, the ball can be made to roll along the rods. If the rods are opened too far, however, the ball will fall through. If successful, the ball will roll off the end of the rods and onto the unstable table.
- The unstable table is a flat table with a border around it and various pegs in the middle; the player must tilt this table with a lever in order to get the ball onto a ramp at the end, and avoid falling off at a false opening in the border.
- The ramp leads to the tire obstacle, by hitting a button the player must jump up onto successively higher levels and finally through a hoop.
- After this the ball enters a blind (covered) maze, which the player must use a lever to guide the ball through by tilting. The cover for the maze is removable, which is useful for younger players.
- Once through the maze the ball is placed on a rocket-shaped platform which is moved, using the same dial as the crane, to put the ball into a catapult.
- Hitting the final button activates the catapult and fires the ball towards a bell. Once the bell rings the game is over.
- Also, the player can attempt to complete the course before the 60-second timer runs out.

== Additional mazes ==
=== Screwball Scramble Level 2 ===
A second course, "Screwball Scramble Level 2" was released by Tomy Europe in 2020, and designed to be connected to the first one. It was released in Japan in March 2023 under the name of Lit. "Athletic Land Game - Sea Adventure" (アスレチックランドゲーム シーアドベンチャー) with a different color scheme.

=== Screwball Scramble Level Up ===
A third course, "Screwball Scramble Level Up" was released in 2023, once again by Tomy Europe. This version of the game takes inspiration from arcade games like Donkey Kong with a vertical design and dark retro-style colors. It was released in Japan in 2024 as Lit. "Athletic Land Game - Level Up" (アスレチックランドゲーム-レベルアップ).
