= The Lingo Show =

British children's educational series

- Genre: Children's; Animated
- Created by: Nicole Seymour
- Directed by: Charlotte Bushell & Lee Kitchen
- Voices of: Marc Silk; Lin Lin; Aurelie Harp; Fran Canals; Britta Gartner; Elen Rhys; Bhasker Patel
- Composer: Barrie Bignold
- Country of origin: United Kingdom
- Original language: English
- No. of seasons: 2
- No. of episodes: 30

Production
- Executive producer: Adam Redfern
- Running time: 11 minutes
- Production companies: BBC; Dinamo Productions; BBC Studios

Original release
- Network: CBeebies
- Release: 12 March 2012 – 7 June 2013

The Lingo Show is a British animated children's television series created by Nicole Seymour, produced by the BBC and animated by Dinamo Productions for BBC's CBeebies channel and programming block, in association with BBC Studios. Kate Sullivan designed the characters and many other elements. The show, which combines animation with live-action footage, is designed to introduce preschool kids to new languages.

The programme, which ran for 2 series totalling 30 episodes, initially began as an interactive minisite on the CBeebies website, aired on CBeebies from 2012 to 2013, and was repeated until 2017.

== Plot ==
The series revolves around a show bug host named Lingo and his family of bugs, who each specialize in a different language. At the request of children, he travels to the location where the children are so one of his performers can perform a Big Bug Show. In each episode, the chosen performer, with "assistance" from the viewing audience, searches around in two different locations for two props required for their show, as they introduce 3 different objects in their language, before they use magic to teleport them back to Lingo, and after both props have been found and brought back to Lingo, they perform the show for the delighted preschool children.

== Characters ==
=== Main characters ===
The characters were designed by Kate Sullivan.

- Lingo (voiced by Marc Silk): The ringmaster of the Big Bug Show. He is in charge of bringing his Big Bug Stage across the world to host shows and often has wild ambitions as to what they could entail. Lingo is half ladybird and half butterfly.
- Wèi (voiced by Lin Lin): A small male ant who is from China and speaks Mandarin. He is often seen wearing roller skates and a crash helmet. He is commonly mistaken for a female due to his high-pitched voice.
- Jargonaise (voiced by Aurelie Harp): A fabulous pink female housefly who is from France and speaks French. In contrast with her being a housefly, she is very pretty and kind.
- Queso (voiced by Fran Canals): A charming and funny male moth who is from Spain and speaks Spanish. He is often seen carrying his flamenco guitar.
- Lieb (voiced by Britta Gartner): An athletic female tick who is from Germany and speaks German. She was added to the cast in the second season.
- Blodwen (voiced by Elen Rhys): A nurturing fuzzy green female caterpillar who speaks in an operatic tone. She comes from Wales and speaks Welsh.
- Jaadoo (voiced by Bhasker Patel): A valiant male white green striped tick who is from Pakistan and speaks Urdu. He is constantly seen riding a yellow unicycle, and has magic powers.
- Kikli: An energetic yellow female damselfly who is from India and speaks Punjabi. She is often seen with a magic wand and giggles a lot.
- Dyzio: A sleepy brown male stick insect who is from Poland and speaks Polish.
- Subah: A sassy green female woodlouse in a purple polka-dotted shell who is from Somalia and speaks Somali.

=== Minor characters ===
- Bloozles: A group of small green aphids that helps Lingo in preparing for the Big Bug Show.
- Floozles: The silent fireflies that also help Lingo prepare for the show.
- Spaestro: A blue spider with eight arms who plays several instruments, including a washboard, a bass drum, a trumpet, a piano, a violin, a xylophone, a music player, and a little drum on top of his head. He is unnamed in the show.

== Production ==
The Lingo Show was originally created as an interactive minisite by CBeebies web producer Nicole Seymour, which launched in February 2011. The site features various activities which teach children new words in numerous languages; with the website periodically updated to include new languages. The site proved popular and in February that year, it was decided to bring the series to television format, with Dinamo Productions doing animation. The first season, consisting of fifteen episodes, which teaches Mandarin, French and Spanish, began airing from 12 March 2012. The second season, also consisting of fifteen episodes, which teaches German, Welsh and Urdu, began airing from 20 May 2013. Five exclusive audio-only episodes were released on CBeebies Radio in 2013, teaching the same languages as the second season of the TV series.
