= John Hasler =

British actor (b. 1974)

- Born: 21 April 1974 (age 52); Barking, London, England
- Occupation: Actor
- Years active: 1984–present
- Children: 1
- Website: johnhasler.co.uk

John Hasler (born 21 April 1974) is an English actor who is best known for playing T-Shirt in the children's television series T-Bag from 1985 to 1992, and for voicing Thomas in the UK dub of the children's television series Thomas & Friends from 2015 to 2021. Hasler was the only cast member on T-Bag to remain with the show for its entire television run, starting as a young boy and leaving as a teenager.

== Career ==
Hasler began his career in the mid-1980s. He played T-Shirt, a prominent character in the T-Bag TV series, between 1985 and 1992, being the only character to star in all nine series and in all four Christmas specials.

He has appeared in Renford Rejects and Casualty and provided voices and additional dialogue replacement (ADR) for a number of film, radio and television productions. He also appeared for an old TV advert for Persil washing powder in the 1990s.

In 2012, he joined the voice cast of Fireman Sam as Arnold McKinley and James Jones, taking over the latter role from Steven Kynman.

From August 2012 to February 2015, Hasler was cast in the United Kingdom tour of Disney's The Lion King, performing as the meerkat Timon.

In 2015, he became the replacement voice actor of Thomas in the UK and Rheneas in the UK and US narrations of Thomas & Friends, replacing Ben Small after he left the show, until the series ended in 2021, however Hasler continues to voice him in YouTube shorts. He also voices the lead character Trafalgar on Teenage Fairytale Dropouts, protagonist "Toot" in Toot the Tiny Tugboat and Foz in Go Jetters.

In 2021, Hasler provided the British English voice of Hugo the Jungle Animal in all three films.

== Filmography ==
=== Film ===
Year	Title	Role(s)	Notes
1984	Breakout	Stephen	
2011	10 Arenas of Marwood	Irving Clifford	
2014	Fireman Sam: Heroes of the Storm	Arnold McKinley, James Jones	UK voice
2015	Thomas & Friends: The Adventure Begins	Thomas	UK voice
2015	Thomas & Friends: Sodor's Legend of the Lost Treasure	Thomas	UK voice
2016	Thomas & Friends: The Great Race	Thomas (UK) Rheneas	Voice; uncredited in the US
2017	Fireman Sam: Alien Alert	Arnold McKinley, James Jones	UK voice
2017	Thomas & Friends: Journey Beyond Sodor	Thomas	UK voice
2018	Thomas & Friends: Big World! Big Adventures!	Thomas	UK voice

=== Television ===
Year	Title	Role	Notes
1985–92	T-Bag	T-Shirt	94 episodes
1991	Doctor at the Top	Alec	1 episode
1994	Harry's Mad	Access	Episode: "Mad Macaw"
1994	Against All Odds	Paul Cheatle	Episode: "The Horse and His Boys"
1995	The Legends of Treasure Island	Jim Hawkins	Voice; 13 episodes (Series 2)
2000	Casualty	Lee Carter	Episode: "Not Waving But Drowning"
2000	Renford Rejects	Jack	Episode: "Best Laid Plans"
2008	Get Squiggling	All male characters	Voice
2012–present	Fireman Sam	James Jones, Arnold McKinley	Main UK voice role
2013–14	Teenage Fairytale Dropouts	Trafalgar	Main voice role
2014–2015	Toot the Tiny Tugboat	Toot	Main voice role; 51 episodes
2015–2021	Thomas & Friends	Thomas / Narrator (UK) Rheneas (UK/US)	Main voice role, succeeding Ben Small
2015–2021	Go Jetters	Foz	Main voice role
2019–present	Think About Lesson	Pet	Supporting voice role
2019–20	YooHoo to the Rescue	YooHoo	UK dub
2019	Thomas & Friends: Steam Team to the Rescue	Thomas / Narrator (UK)	Main voice role
2019	Thomas & Friends: Digs and Discoveries (All Tracks Lead to Rome / Mines of Mystery)	Thomas / Narrator (UK)	Main voice role
2019	Robozuna	Zeve, Superfan, Dr Naron	1 episode
2020	Thomas & Friends: The Royal Engine	Thomas / Narrator (UK)	Main voice role

Preceded by Ben Small	Voice of Thomas (U. K. dub); 2015–2021	Succeeded by Aaron Barashi
