= Watch My Chops! =

French animated series

- UK Title card
- Also known as: Watch my Chops! (UK)
- Genre: Animated sitcom Comedy; Cartoon
- Created by: Stephan Franck; Emmanuel Franck
- Developed by: Marie-Caroline Villard; Fethi Nedjari
- Written by: Isabeau Merle
- Directed by: Albert Pereira Lazaro
- Voices of: Keith Wickham; Ben Small; Dan Russell; Laurence Bouvard; Dian Perry; Bob Saker
- Composers: Dimitri Bodianski; Bruno Guéraçague; Nicholas Varley
- Country of origin: France
- No. of seasons: 2
- No. of episodes: 104 (list of episodes)

Production
- Executive producers: Roch Lener; Jonathan Peel
- Animator: Borisfen-Lutece
- Running time: 11-13 minutes
- Production company: Millimages

Original release
- Network: France 3
- Release: 21 February 2003 – 19 August 2006
- Network: Gulli
- Release: January 11, 2014 – April 3, 2016

Corneil & Bernie(also known as Watch my Chops!) is a French animated series about an intelligent talking dog, Corneil, and his "dog sitter", Bernie Barges. It starred Keith Wickham, Ben Small, Dian Perry, Dan Russell, Becca Stewart, Laurence Bouvard and Mark Laidman. The series originally aired from 2003 to 2006 with 52 episodes. It was then revived in 2014 for a 2nd season with an additional 52 episodes.

The original French title is Corneil et Bernie. In the UK, the show is called Watch My Chops!, named after Corneil's catchphrase. In the United States and Australia, the show is titled Corneil & Bernie.

== Plot summary ==
Corneil is an intelligent dog: not only can he read and write perfect English, but he is much smarter than most people. Since he is so smart, he knows that life does not get any better than being a pampered pet, and so he does anything he can to keep his owners John and Beth from realizing his phenomenal skills. This plan begins to go awry when they hire the pinheaded Bernie Barges to "dog-sit", and Bernie learns about Corneil's secret. Though the two frequently bicker, they form an uneasy friendship, and Corneil finds himself using his brainy powers to bail Bernie out of various scrapes.

Most episodes are driven by Corneil's reluctance to let anyone know that he is intelligent and capable of human speech. The only person who does know is dogsitter Bernie, whose Uncle Rico minds John and Beth's apartment. Bernie discovered Corneil's speaking abilities by accident, and unfortunately he is somewhat lacking in intelligence and mostly devoid of morals. All this puts Corneil in an uncomfortable position, as Bernie often takes it upon himself to be "the voice" of Corneil, capitalising on Corneil's reluctance to communicate and ignoring Corneil's requests.

== Characters ==
=== Main ===
- Corneil (voiced by Keith Wickham) – A highly intelligent, elitist dog who speaks with a northern English accent. He loves the comfort of his apartment and is able to talk, read, and write, which he tries to keep a secret, not wanting to be treated differently by humans. In the presence of his masters, he acts like a regular dog. It is only when he is alone or in the company of Bernie that he behaves like a human, answering the phone, cooking, solving problems of mathematics or researching the questions of philosophy. He usually either helps Bernie with his problems or bails him out while other times pursuing his own goal with Bernie's support. His mannerisms are reminiscent of Mister Peabody from The Adventures of Rocky and Bullwinkle and Friends segment "Peabody's Improbable History".
- Bernie Barges (voiced by Ben Small) – Corneil's best friend and primary caretaker. Bernie is innovative and opinionated, but quite dull-witted. While sometimes arrogant and careless, he is good-natured and respects Corneil. He was initially confined to the boring role of dog-sitter, but he soon found a true friend to navigate life with. When Corneil proves reluctant, he can always threaten to reveal Corneil's secret. He usually tries to pursue his own self-serving goals, with Corneil either bailing him out or helping him with them. Bernie sometimes acts as the "frontman" for Corneil's goals.
- John and Beth (voiced by Dan Russell and Laurence Bouvard) – Corneil's snobby, rich owners. John is an auctioneer and Beth is chief editor of a newspaper. They are a couple; modern, dynamic and a little eccentric. They love Corneil as if he were their own son and care deeply for him. They also place a good amount of trust in Bernie, being their preferred dog-sitter for Corneil.
- Uncle Rico (voiced by Dan Russell) – A high school dropout and former boxer. He was forced to retire following a knockout that claimed eight of his teeth. Today, he is a caretaker and deals regularly with his nephew Bernie.

=== Supporting and minor ===
- Romeo (voiced by Dan Russell) – The captain of the school football team. As his name suggests, Romeo is a great seducer who has a lot of success with girls. Bernie admires Romeo and dreams of being like him. The reciprocal is of course not true, and Romeo does not take Bernie seriously, though can be friendly at times. Romeo hates Corneil, whom he takes for a fool.
- Martha (voiced by Laurence Bouvard) – Another classmate of Bernie's. She is intellectual and often skeptical of Bernie's claims. Martha takes care of the school newspaper, which has many causes to defend, and its network of informants allows it to be effective.
- Mrs. Martin (voiced by Laurence Bouvard) – Bernie's mean school principal. She wants her school to be great and have a glorious future but these hopes are usually dashed because of Bernie. As a result, she thinks he is quite the troublemaker and often gives him detention. She is also known to punish students for things that they have not done. Principal Martin tutored Uncle Rico so that he could finally get his high school diploma.
- Mrs. Solo (voiced by Laurence Bouvard) – One of Bernie and Corneil's mean neighbors in the apartment building. She dislikes them because they are "always getting in her way" and she once hit Corneil with her umbrella and Corneil made Bernie take her to court.
- Karen (voiced by Laurence Bouvard) – One of Bernie's classmates. She is pretty and smart and she is often seen reading a book. Despite Karen's hatred of Bernie in "Unlucky Break" and "Corneil in Love," a wallpaper from Millimages states that she will marry Bernie someday.
- Laura Ryan – Another of Bernie's classmates.
- Julie (voiced by Laurence Bouvard) – One of Bernie's classmates.
- Frank – Romeo's friend and one of Bernie's classmates.

== Episodes ==
Season	Episodes	Originally released	
Season	Episodes	First released	Last released
1	52	February 21, 2003	August 19, 2006
2	52	January 11, 2014	April 3, 2016

== Broadcast and home media ==
Watch My Chops! premiered in France in December 2003, where it aired on France 3 for its first season, and on Gulli for its second. The series has since aired in the United States on Nicktoons from 2004 to 2008, in the UK on CBBC from 2003 to 2011, and in Australia on ABC Entertains as of 2016.

Mill Creek Entertainment released the complete first season on DVD in Region 1 on 18 March 2008. This release has since been discontinued and is now out of print.

== Production ==
This show was animated, produced, written and directed in Paris by Millimages, and the English dialogue was recorded in London at The Sound Company studios. The first season was animated with digital ink and paint, whereas the 2014 revival was animated in flash.

== See also ==
- Kaput & Zösky
