= List of Watch My Chops! episodes =

This is the complete list of episodes of the animated series Watch My Chops!.

== Series overview ==
Season	Episodes	Originally released	
Season	Episodes	First released	Last released
1	52	February 21, 2003	August 19, 2006
2	52	January 11, 2014	April 3, 2016

== Episodes ==
=== Season 1 (2003-2006) ===
No.	Title	Original release date
1	"Panic on Board"	February 21, 2003
Bernie has to take Corneil to his owners, which involves flying in an airplane. Corneil then reveals that he is afraid to ride in airplanes and tries everything possible to avoid getting on.
2	"Stroke of Genius"	February 21, 2003
After Corneil writes a mathematical equation on Bernie's teacher's blackboard, Bernie's teacher believes that Bernie is a genius.
3	"Moonstroke"	February 28, 2003
Bernie believes he has seen Dracula.
4	"Jungle Panic"	February 28, 2003
Bernie becomes a contestant on the reality show "Jungle Panic" and brings an unwitting Corneil with him.
5	"Radio Bernie"	March 6, 2003
After no one listens to him, Bernie has Corneil help him make a radio show called "Radio Bernie" but after the first show is a bomb, Corneil makes a fake phone call that makes Bernie decide to make another one. When Corneil makes a show as Dr. Bernie the show becomes a hit.
6	"Close Encounters of the Alien Kind"	March 6, 2003
After Bernie is made fun of for reading science fiction/alien magazines, he claims that he has seen a real alien. When his friends want to see it, he forces Corneil to dress up as an alien.
7	"Corneil in Love"	March 13, 2003
Corneil falls in love with a poodle living in his apartment complex. However, Bernie is not too fond of the dog's owner who seems to have taken a liking to Bernie.
8	"Doggone!"	March 13, 2003
Bernie loses Corneil while he is distracted at a store and believes that Corneil had been kidnapped. Bernie soon finds out otherwise, but not before getting the police involved.
9	"Peas in a Pod"	March 20, 2003
Corneil meets another dog owned by one of Beth's friends who has a striking resemblance to Corneil. Bernie is later fooled by Corneil into taking the other dog to the amusement park to go onto a roller coaster. However, Corneil realizes that he made a huge mistake.
10	"Surprise Surprise"	March 20, 2003
Bernie is assigned the task of picking up Beth's gift from John for John and Beth's anniversary and is determined to make it a special night for the two during their dinner. Corneil, on the other hand, is skeptical of Bernie's ability to not ruin John and Beth's night after hearing about Bernie's past mess-ups.
11	"The Secret"	March 27, 2003
After accidentally wiping out the city's power by damaging the generator, Bernie must make amends by taking care of an elderly man. Corneil later suspects that the man may have learned his secret and the old man soon puts both Corneil and Bernie's lives in danger while they attempt to find out what the man knows.
12	"200 Feet Under"	March 27, 2003
While Corneil and Bernie are hiking, they learn from reporters stationed in the area that miners are trapped in a cave in their area and Bernie is determined to become a hero by going underground to rescue them. However, he puts his and Corneil's lives in danger because the cave is about to be flooded.
13	"Art Attack"	April 3, 2003
A robber named Joe the Scoundrel breaks into John and Beth's apartment and steals a very valuable painting in the dead of night while Corneil is home alone and witnesses the whole ordeal. He soon drives his owners and Bernie to the edge, afraid that Joe will return, but he soon gathers the strength to capture the thief.
14	"City Bumpkins"	April 3, 2003
When Bernie makes a visit to his red-neck cousins out in the country, Corneil resents the way he is treated by them and is given the task of capturing a wolf that has been devouring Bernie's cousin's chickens during the night.
15	"A Dog's Life"	April 10, 2003
Corneil grows tired of the way dogs like himself are treated and is driven to the edge when a woman at his apartment complex hits him with an umbrella because he is always in her way. Corneil takes her to court with Bernie as his lawyer, who is only interested in the publicity while Corneil only wants an apology. Things don't go well for Corneil when the court learns of his luxurious life.
16	"Double Jeopardy"	April 10, 2003
Bernie is holding Romeo's karate video for him, but it ends up getting confiscated by his school principal. Bernie later convinces Corneil to help him get the tape back by telling him that it is a tape of Corneil talking. When Corneil discovers the deception he gives Bernie a taste of his own medicine.
17	"Unlucky Break"	April 17, 2003
Bernie asks out a girl named Karen, who he has a crush on, to a school dance so that Romeo doesn't get the chance to, but breaks his leg just before and tries to cover it up by insisting that Karen and him stay seated during the dance with the help of Corneil while Romeo attempts to get Karen away from Bernie.
18	"Superficial Intelligence"	April 17, 2003
When the newspaper ranks dogs as behind humans in evolution, Corneil takes part in an intelligence contest to prove the writers wrong. But, he soon puts his secret in danger in his determination to beat a monkey taking part in the contest.
19	"Pregnant Paws"	April 24, 2003
When Corneil finds out that John and Beth are giving him away because they are having a baby, Corneil asks Bernie for help.
20	"The Fan"	April 24, 2003
Corneil criticizes Bernie for being a fan of a soccer star, but later realizes that he himself is a fan of an opera singer and tries to prevent Bernie from finding out, knowing that he'll be ridiculed for it, but Bernie eventually figures it out.
21	"Dog Walk Model"	May 1, 2003
The store owner is looking for new dog model and Bernie thinks it should be Corneil, but due to his embarrassment of wearing clothes he refuses, but Bernie is not giving up that easily.
22	"A Friend In Need"	May 1, 2003
Romeo friends are all away on vacation and has no choice but to ask bernie to hang out with him, Corneil on the other hand wants to go to the library instead and will try anything to get Romeo to kick them out of his home.
23	"Don Corneilius"	May 8, 2003
Joe the Scoundrel returns, but this time he's turned a new leaf and is currently working in the cafe Bernie usually eats in. Knowing that Joe will always be out to find Inspector Corneilius, Corniel comes up with a plan to make sure Joe never finds him.
24	"The Dog-Sitter Show"	May 8, 2003
Bernie loves this comedy show but Corneil hates it because it's an insult to dogs, later the shows star dog is injured and has to be replaced, Bernie wants Corneil to join, but because of his hatred for the show he refused until Bernie uses reverse psychology to trick him.
25	"Santa Paws"	May 15, 2003
After Corneil rescues a dog from the dog-catcher, Bernie parades around the town at night as "Santa Man" with his sidekick "Santa Dog".
26	"Love Me, Love My Dog"	May 15, 2003
A relative of John and Beth's who has lost her dog gets a little bit too attached to Corneil.
27	"Eau de Corneil"	March 19, 2006
Corneil creates his own perfume, and tests it on Bernie. When Bernie starts to become popular, Corneil decides he wants to market the perfume. But Bernie wants to keep it to himself.
28	"Let Talking Dogs Lie"	March 19, 2006
Corneil is tired of Bernie's lies, so when Bernie claims John and Beth gave him their ticket to footballer Vavaropo's party he tears the ticket up and throws it away, only to discover he was telling the truth.
29	"Telepathetic"	March 19, 2006
When Corneil overhears Romeo and Bernie repeats it, he claims he is telepathic. Now Bernie must prove he is telepathic by guessing what's inside Martha's shopping bag, or else Corneil's secret is out.
30	"Things That Go Woof In The Night"	March 19, 2006
Bernie claims to Romeo that John and Beth's apartment is haunted when Corneil cleans up the living room while nobody's around.
31	"The Big Sleep"	March 19, 2006
John & Beth are painting Corneil's room, so Corneil has to spend the night in their room. Unfortunately, Corneil finds out that he talks in his sleep, and asks Bernie to help cure his sleep talking as Corneil fights to stay awake through each night.
32	"Dogs Are Dumb"	March 19, 2006
Bernie bangs his head and loses his memory, and is astonished to again find out that Corneil can talk. Only this time, he doesn't plan to keep it a secret.
33	"The Diary"	March 19, 2006
After Corneil refuses to show Bernie what Corneil has written in his diary, Bernie decides to scare Corneil and thoughtlessly takes his own diary around under the guise of it containing entries of Corneil's ability to talk. Suddenly, Bernie loses his diary and realizes that Julie, Bernie's school friend, has his diary, and Corneil helps him to take the diary back.
34	"Dog's Dinner"	March 19, 2006
While Bernie is dogsitting Corneil at his own place, Bernie finds out that Corneil has never eaten ordinary dog food. After an argument between the two, Bernie refuses to give Corneil anything other than dog food, while Corneil tries to sneak other snacks by Bernie.
35	"Home Sweet Home"	March 19, 2006
Corneil is sent to an animal shelter, where a lonely old man who lives in a retirement home adopts him. Bernie tries to get him back, but Corneil feels bad for the lonely old man and doesn't want to leave him.
36	"Mr. Know It All"	March 19, 2006
Annoyed by Corneil's 'know it all' attitude, Bernie tries to prove him wrong with a souvenir he bought on the beach, which he believes is a true Mayan artefact.
37	"Pipe Dreams"	March 19, 2006
An outburst from Corneil lands Bernie in a half pipe competition between him and a bratty kid named Rudy.
38	"Basic Instinct"	March 19, 2006
John & Beth are planning a cruise. After finding out that Corneil can't swim, Bernie takes it upon himself to reteach Corneil his basic canine instincts.
39	"By A Whisker"	March 19, 2006
To avoid his haircut with Aunt Gina, Bernie tries to get Corneil trimmed instead, but the state of Gina's salon puts Corneil off, especially when he'd rather get his hair done by a top stylist.
40	"Finders Weepers"	March 19, 2006
Corneil urges Bernie to return a watch he found in a garbage can, but Bernie insists on keeping it. Corneil is determined to prove to Bernie that keeping the watch is nothing but bad luck.
41	"Love At First Sight"	June 3, 2006
Bernie tries to separate Uncle Rico and Mrs. Martin after mistakenly believe the two are in love.
42	"Join the Club"	June 3, 2006
Bernie finds out that Corneil writes poetry under a pseudonym. Bernie pretends to be him in order to get them both into the poetry club. When Bernie has to prove himself, Corneil builds a state of the art pen that allows him to write the words while the pen is in Bernie's hand.
43	"No Place Like Home"	June 24, 2006
The cousins of Bernie are in town for the agricultural show, Bernie begs Corneil to install(settle) at John and Beth's, but Corneil do not have all right because the cousins of Bernie are neglected. To what extent Corneil will keep(guard) you see he its sense(direction) of the hospitality?
44	"Guardian Angel"	June 24, 2006
Bernie, worried that he may not get the scooter he wants for his birthday, goes on a camping trip in an effort to bond with his uncle Rico. In a turn of events, uncle Rico may end up bonding with Corneil.
45	"Who Said That?"	July 19, 2006
After Bernie loses his money, he tries to get a job in ventriloquism, and Corneil's the puppet. Note: When Bernie and Corneil go to the animal shelter, Nelson the Elephant from 64 Zoo Lane and Pablo the Fox from Pablo the Little Red Fox make cameo appearances in the cages.
46	"Gone To The Dogs"	July 19, 2006
Bernie enters Corneil in a race against Romeo's dog, Turbo. It soon appears that the training required to beat Turbo may be too much for Corneil to handle.
47	"Your Move"	July 22, 2006
Corneil builds a highly intelligent robot named "X998". Bernie tries to steal the robot to assist him on his schoolwork. After accidentally biting off an important piece, the robot malfunctions and causes mischief throughout the school.
48	"Fur Wars"	July 22, 2006
Bernie finds a cat, and asks for John and Beth to keep it. Corneil does not get along with the cat.
49	"Where There's a Will"	August 7, 2006
Bernie is mistaken as the heir of a large fortune. Corneil tries to set things straight.
50	"Police Dogged"	August 7, 2006
Bernie is hired as an intern for a police department. Disappointed by the menial tasks they have given him, he seeks out to solve a real crime.
51	"Pork-a-Palooza"	August 19, 2006
After crashing his cousins' tractor, Bernie enters Corneil into a farm animal contest to try and win prize money to pay off the damages.
52	"Bone of Contention"	August 19, 2006
Bernie tries to take credit for a bone Corneil discovered while they're on a school trip to the desert.

=== Season 2 (2014-2016) ===
No.	Title	Original release date
1	"Pass the Chocolates"	January 11, 2014
Bernie takes on a new responsibility as both a dog sitter and babysitter when he is asked to look after the mayor's grandson, Rocky. His only instruction is to keep Rocky away from chocolate.
2	"Stroke of Genius"	January 11, 2014
When Penelope and her dog, Clovis, mysteriously stop speaking and barking, Penelope's mother hires Bernie to help restore Clovis's bark in hopes that Penelope will speak again. After Bernie's attempts fail, Corneil steps in with an experimental approach, but an unexpected hypnosis mishap causes Bernie to begin behaving like a dog.
3	"Eglantine and Buttercup"	January 12, 2014
Using the online alias "Buttercup," Corneil develops a friendship with a girl named Eglantine but keeps his identity a secret by avoiding an in-person meeting. After discovering Corneil's online correspondence, Bernie impersonates Buttercup and arranges to meet Eglantine, leading to unexpected complications.
4	"A Girl's Scooter"	January 18, 2014
Discouraged after seeing Romeo's impressive scooter, Bernie buys a new one in hopes of winning the upcoming scooter race. Unaware that it is marketed as a girls' scooter, he becomes the target of teasing from his classmates. Determined to prove himself, Bernie enters the race, while Corneil keeps quiet about the scooter's intended design.
5	"It's Not Funny"	January 12, 2014
On April Fools' Day, Bernie's constant pranks begin to wear on those around him. Hoping to prove his jokes are more than harmless tricks, he convinces Uncle Rico that he has won the lottery. Believing the news, Rico decides to leave everything behind to pursue a new life in Haiti, forcing Bernie and Corneil to find a way to undo the misunderstanding before the consequences become permanent.
6	"A Forced Health Regime"	January 19, 2014
Bernie is asked to deliver Corneil's urine sample to the veterinary clinic, but after accidentally spilling it, he replaces it with his own. The resulting test leads the veterinarian to incorrectly diagnose Corneil with a serious health condition requiring a strict diet. Feeling responsible, Bernie decides to follow the same diet, only to discover that sticking to it is more difficult than he anticipated.
7	"A Puppy, If You Want!"	March 6, 2016
When Beth's friend Lise visits with her dog, Ulla, everyone assumes that Ulla and Corneil would make the perfect pair. Corneil, however, has no interest in becoming a father. Meanwhile, rather than helping Corneil avoid the situation, Bernie is distracted by his attempts to impress Ulla's dog sitter, creating further complications.
8	"Auntie Bingo"	January 25, 2014
After Romeo receives a car from his grandmother, Bernie becomes determined to get one of his own. He convinces Corneil to accompany him to a retirement home under the pretense of helping an elderly resident, but his true plan is to pose as the grandson of a wealthy woman in hopes of receiving an inheritance. Their scheme becomes more complicated when the retirement home's director is revealed to have similar ambitions.
9	"A Real Faker"	January 18, 2014
During a class visit to a hospital, Bernie is teased by his classmates for not having an impressive scar. When Mrs. Martin announces a pop quiz, Bernie ignores Corneil's advice and pretends to be ill so he can remain at the hospital and avoid the test. While there, he also attempts to earn a scar of his own, leading to a series of misadventures.
10	"My Favorite Ghost"	April 5, 2014
After returning library books that are several months overdue, Bernie is assigned to help at the public library as punishment. While working there, he develops a crush on a library intern and goes to great lengths to impress her. Meanwhile, Corneil becomes increasingly suspicious that the intern may not be as trustworthy as she appears.
11	"No Dogs Allowed!"	January 26, 2014
While trying to prevent Bernie from making a bad decision, Corneil accidentally causes a messy accident involving Mrs. Solo. Furious, she uses her connections at the Health Department to have Corneil removed from the building. However, the other residents come together to defend Corneil and prevent him from being separated from Bernie.
12	"Ball Crazy Bernie"	January 19, 2014
Bernie goes to great lengths to retrieve his beloved ball, even sneaking into a hospital after visiting hours. However, when he and Corneil search for the ball in the hospital park, the director discovers Bernie communicating with his dog and decides to keep him under observation. As they find themselves surrounded by psychiatric patients, Corneil must find a way to help them leave while Bernie remains determined to recover his ball.
13	"Lamebrain Party"	February 1, 2014
Romeo's VIP party invitation list includes everyone except Bernie, who becomes determined to attend. While trying to get an invitation, Bernie accidentally embarrasses Romeo, who unexpectedly invites him to the event. Excited by the opportunity, Bernie ignores Corneil's concerns that Romeo may be planning to use the party as a chance to get revenge.
14	"There's Something About Jocelyne"	March 22, 2014
A new girl named Jocelyn arrives at school, quickly attracting the attention of all the boys, including Bernie, who recognizes her as his childhood crush. Determined to impress her, Bernie uses Corneil's love of animals to help him get closer to her. However, unresolved memories from their past threaten to complicate his plans.
15	"Surprise"	January 26, 2014
Bernie's cousins surprise him with the news that they plan to sell their ranch, causing Bernie to worry that they will move to town and disrupt his life. Determined to stop this from happening, Bernie travels to the ranch with Corneil in an attempt to change their decision.
16	"It"ll Make You a Man, Bernie!"	January 25, 2014
According to the Barges family tradition, Bernie’s cousins decide it is time for him to go hunting as a rite of passage. However, Corneil tries to prevent Bernie from harming any animals, causing Bernie to appear inexperienced in front of his cousins. Determined to prove himself, Bernie sets out on his own to find a legendary wild pig and regain their respect.
17	"Muse Madness"	March 16, 2014
Corneil and Bernie meet renowned artist Andy Bariol at a private gallery opening. When Andy reveals that he has lost his inspiration, Bernie invites him to his cousin’s ranch, describing it as the perfect place for creativity. However, the visit turns out to be far more chaotic and challenging than Bernie expected.
18	"Joint Custody"	February 1, 2016
When John and Beth decide to live separately for a while to improve their relationship, Corneil fears that they are heading toward divorce. Bernie initially teases him, but soon realizes that their separation could affect his role as Corneil's caretaker. Together, Bernie and Corneil attempt to reunite John and Beth.
19	"Reach for the Stars!"	February 8, 2014
Bernie dreams of appearing on the Penelope Lamborghini show and gets his chance when the host visits his town searching for her next big story at his school. Despite Corneil’s criticism of the pursuit of fame, Bernie is determined to do whatever it takes to become a temporary television celebrity.
20	"We Are the Champions… or Not"	February 2, 2014
After being chased by a nervous dog, Corneil and Bernie accidentally set a national record in an agility competition. Impressed by their achievement, the National Agility Club invites them to represent the country at the World Championship. Corneil trains seriously to make John and Beth proud, while Bernie has his own personal reasons for wanting to win.
21	"Dollar Panic"	May 27, 2014
During an argument, Corneil and Bernie accidentally press a button on John's computer that causes him to lose his money. Too embarrassed to admit their mistake, they try to fix the situation themselves. When John plans to donate a one-million-dollar check to charity, Bernie and Corneil must find a way to prevent further financial trouble and restore what was lost.
22	"The Crime of the Century"	March 16, 2014
After falling for a girl he sees on the street, Bernie and Corneil follow her to learn more about her. They soon discover that she is connected to a criminal group and find themselves caught up in their plans. Forced to assist the gang, Bernie and Corneil struggle with the challenges of pretending to be successful criminals.
23	"A Billionaire's Vacation"	March 23, 2014
During their vacation, Corneil and Bernie struggle to afford access to the beach. Bernie uses his remaining money to buy a metal detector and searches for valuables, eventually discovering a mysterious gold key. Believing it could make him rich, Bernie soon finds himself caught up in a dangerous situation as others begin searching for the key.
24	"Baywatch Dog"	February 27, 2016
During his holiday at the beach, Bernie is determined to impress everyone and gain attention. After noticing that people are more interested in Romeo and the lifeguards, he creates a situation that makes him appear heroic. As a result, Bernie is offered a position as a lifeguard's assistant, but Corneil realizes that the role may lead to trouble.
25	"The Bodyguard"	April 2, 2016
After leaving a photography shop, Corneil and Bernie accidentally exchange envelopes with a mysterious man. When Bernie develops the photos inside, he finds pictures of the mayor along with a large amount of money. Believing they have uncovered a dangerous plot, Bernie and Corneil decide they must protect the mayor and prevent a possible threat.
26	"Weekend in Mexico"	February 28, 2016
After Romeo announces that he is spending the weekend surfing in Hawaii, Bernie wants to impress everyone by claiming he is going to Mexico. As Romeo shares photos from his trip, Bernie must find a way to convince others that he really went away. However, maintaining his story proves to be more difficult than expected.
27	"That's Not Okay!"	March 23, 2014
Corneil creates his own perfume, and tests it on Bernie. When Bernie starts to become popular, Corneil decides he wants to market the perfume. But Bernie wants to keep it to himself.
28	"Poker Face"	March 5, 2016
After finding a valuable poker chip, Bernie discovers that Uncle Rico plays poker every night. When Rico is unable to participate due to an injury, Bernie takes his place despite having no knowledge of the game. As Bernie risks losing Rico’s money, Corneil attempts to teach him the basics but soon realizes he must find another solution to prevent disaster.
29	"A Real Gem"	March 20, 2016
Bernie is expected to spend the weekend at his family ranch, but Corneil refuses to go with him. They decide to hire another dogsitter, Tim, who initially seems like the perfect replacement. However, Tim manipulates John and Beth, causing Bernie to lose his position. Corneil and Bernie must expose Tim's true intentions and restore their situation.
30	"Daddy I Want That!"	February 8, 2014
While shopping at the Megastore, Bernie struggles to afford the items he wants. When a spoiled child named Eric discovers that Corneil can talk, he demands to have the dog. Eric’s father offers Bernie money in exchange for Corneil, and Bernie agrees, believing he can get Corneil back later. However, Eric’s demands quickly become more challenging than expected.
31	"Catherine"	March 15, 2014
Because Bernie frequently forgets things, Corneil installs a voice assistant named Catherine on his phone to help him stay organized. However, an unexpected accident causes the assistant to become uncontrollable, creating new challenges for Bernie and Corneil.
32	"Why Do You Love Me?"	February 8, 2014
The most popular girl at school unexpectedly develops feelings for Bernie, despite his unusual behavior. As others question what she sees in him, Bernie and Corneil try to discover whether her feelings are genuine or if there is another explanation behind her interest.
33	"Tofu Fever"	March 15, 2014
During a school-wide sugar-free operation, Bernie is caught carrying a bag full of candy. As a result, Mrs. Martin extends the restriction for another week, frustrating students who had planned a cafeteria party. Pressured to fix the situation, Bernie attempts to secretly bring sweets back into the school.
34	"The First Kiss Before the End of the World"	March 12, 2016
While walking Corneil in the park, Bernie encounters someone predicting that the world will end within 24 hours. Worried about missing out on an important life experience, Bernie becomes determined to achieve his goal of kissing his dream girl, Scarletta Johnson, before time runs out. Corneil tries to manage Bernie’s increasingly desperate plans.
35	"That's the Bomb"	January 26, 2014
Corneil secretly creates spray-painted artwork around the city, gaining attention as the mysterious artist known as the "Bomber". When Penelope Lamborghini investigates the artist's identity, she finds Bernie near Corneil after a new piece is completed. Bernie takes credit for Corneil's work and gains unexpected fame, much to Corneil's disapproval.
36	"A Public Menace"	March 5, 2016
After Bernie survives a dangerous accident without injury, a rumor spreads that he is indestructible. Despite Corneil’s attempts to convince him otherwise, Bernie believes the story and decides to become a superhero, determined to stop criminals and prove his supposed abilities.
37	"Rico's Revenge"	May 5, 2014
Every year, Felix sends Uncle Rico a photo showing off the teeth he lost during a past boxing match against him, treating it as a humorous tradition. However, Bernie believes Rico is secretly troubled by the memory and convinces him that a rematch is the only way to resolve the situation. Rico agrees to face Felix again, leading to an unexpected challenge.
38	"Arnold the Lady-Killer"	March 16, 2014
John finally plans a holiday with Beth, but an unexpected work emergency forces him to leave her alone. While Beth feels lonely, a surf instructor takes the opportunity to get closer to her. Corneil notices what is happening and tries to prevent him from interfering with John and Beth’s relationship.
39	"A Crazy Day"	March 12, 2016
Corneil wants to get his record signed by the famous singer Carmen Pavarotta during her autograph session. Bernie agrees to help, but only if Corneil assists him in skipping school and follows his plans for the day. However, their scheme becomes complicated when Mrs. Martin unexpectedly spots Bernie.
40	"High-Speed Sitter"	March 26, 2016
While Bernie is supposed to help organize a children’s Christmas event at city hall, he decides to visit the funfair instead. He accidentally starts a bus full of children with no driver and discovers that it cannot be easily stopped. As the situation becomes dangerous, Corneil must find a way to help Bernie and the children get to safety.
41	"The Star, the Scoop and the Actor"	March 13, 2016
Bernie dreams of getting a role in the next Bruce Strategger movie and trains constantly to impress the actor during his visit to town. After sneaking into Bruce's hotel, Bernie discovers that the fearless action star is actually afraid of dogs. Bruce offers Bernie a role in exchange for keeping his fear a secret, but hiding the truth proves difficult.
42	"Uncle Gina"	March 6, 2016
Tired of Bernie's behavior, Mrs. Martin decides to call his uncle for a meeting. After Corneil notices that she seems more understanding toward girls, Bernie disguises himself as Auntie Gina to avoid Rico finding out. His plan initially succeeds, but Bernie's decision to use the disguise to attend Martha's beach party puts everything at risk.
43	"Grannie Oakley"	April 3, 2016
On Granny's birthday, John and Beth leave her at home while they go out to buy a present. However, Granny takes the opportunity to leave on her own and enjoy the day her way. Corneil and Bernie try to catch up with her, but her energy and determination make it difficult to keep up.
44	"The Runway Show"	April 3, 2016
When Corneil and Bernie notice unusual animals being taken to the same location, they suspect something is wrong. Corneil discovers that the animals are being brought to a laboratory and fears that experiments are being conducted on them. Determined to investigate, they enter the facility, but Corneil becomes increasingly anxious about what they might discover.
45	"Number 1 Rebel"	March 26, 2016
After Bernie tells Corneil that he acts like an old-fashioned dog, Corneil decides to learn how to behave more like a teenager. However, his lessons from Bernie have an unexpected effect, causing Corneil to adopt an exaggerated teenage attitude and develop a rebellious streak.
46	"The Country Cure"	March 19, 2016
After becoming overwhelmed by stress, Bernie’s doctor recommends that he spend some time in the countryside. Away from video games and television, Bernie quickly becomes bored, and even Corneil begins missing their usual routine. However, John and Beth enjoy the peaceful lifestyle and are reluctant to leave.
47	"A Friend of John's"	March 13, 2016
While John and Beth are away, a man claiming to be John's friend arrives at the house. Bernie welcomes him and spends time playing video games with him, but Corneil becomes suspicious of the visitor’s intentions. Believing the man may be dangerous, Corneil and Bernie must find a way to uncover the truth and handle the situation.
48	"The Scooter Gang"	April 2, 2016
While riding scooters with Corneil, Bernie is mistaken for a member of the notorious Scooter Gang after being seen with one of their riders. To prove his innocence, Bernie offers to help the police by infiltrating the gang and gathering information. However, his trusting nature and lack of experience make the mission much more complicated than expected.
49	"Corneil Express"	March 19, 2016
After Bernie criticizes Corneil for only giving advice and not taking action, Corneil decides to start his own delivery business called "Corneil Express." Bernie handles the deliveries and takes his new job very seriously. When someone attempts to take a letter he is delivering, Bernie refuses to give it up, leading to a chaotic chase.
50	"Elvis, Johnny and the Other Guys"	March 20, 2016
On Corneil's birthday, two puppies resembling him are mysteriously left at the doorstep. While Corneil denies being their father, John, Beth, and Bernie assume they are his puppies and decide to keep them, naming them Elvis and Johnny. Corneil and Bernie must uncover who the puppies truly belong to and why they were brought to Corneil.
51	"Snake Under the Sofa"	April 2, 2016
While walking past a furniture shop, Bernie becomes interested in a girl who appears to be flirting with him from inside the store. Corneil quickly realizes that she is using a sales tactic to attract customers. He must find a way to stop Bernie from being persuaded into buying another sofa.
52	"The Art of War"	April 3, 2016
After being unable to defend himself during an encounter with teenagers, Corneil decides he needs to learn self-defense. He and Bernie take kung fu lessons from Master Chang, but their training turns out to focus on making pancakes instead. While Corneil quickly masters the technique, they struggle to understand how it will help him become a better fighter.
