= List of fantasy films of the 2010s =

This is a list of fantasy films released in the 2010s. Films listed include live action and animated.

== List ==
Title	Director	Cast	Country	Studios	Ref.	Released
2010
Alice in Wonderland	Tim Burton	Mia Wasikowska, Johnny Depp, Helena Bonham Carter, Anne Hathaway, Stephen Fry, Matt Lucas, Alan Rickman, Christopher Lee	United States	Roth Films, Team Todd, The Zanuck Company Walt Disney Studios Motion Pictures (distribution)		5 March 2010
Arrietty	Hiromasa Yonebayashi	Moises Arias, Bridgit Mendler, David Henrie, Carol Burnett, Will Arnett, Amy Poehler	Japan	Studio Ghibli Toho (distribution)		17 July 2010 (Japan)
Arthur 3: The War of Two Worlds	Luc Besson		France	EuropaCorp		13 October 2010 (France)
The Chronicles of Narnia: The Voyage of the Dawn Treader	Michael Apted	Ben Barnes, Skandar Keynes, Georgie Henley, Liam Neeson	United States	20th Century Fox (distribution) Fox 2000 Pictures, Walden Media, Dune Entertainment		10 December 2010
Clash of the Titans	Louis Leterrier	Sam Worthington, Liam Neeson, Ralph Fiennes, Gemma Arterton, Mads Mikkelsen, Luke Evans, Liam Cunningham, Danny Huston	United States	Legendary Pictures, Thunder Road Pictures, The Zanuck Company Warner Bros. Pictures (distribution)		2 April 2010
Dante's Inferno: An Animated Epic	Mike Disa, Shukō Murase, Yosuomi Umetsu	Steve Blum, Graham McTavish, Peter Jessop	Japan	Film Roman, Production I.G., Dong Woo Animation		9 February 2010
Dark World	Anton Megerdichev	Svetlana Ivanova, Ivan Zhidkov	Russia	Central Partnership, Shaman Pictures Central Partnership (distribution)		7 October 2010 (Russia)
The Extraordinary Adventures of Adèle Blanc-Sec	Luc Besson	Louise Bourgoin, Mathieu Amalric, Gilles Lellouche	France	EuropaCorp		14 April 2010 (France)
Gulliver's Travels	Rob Letterman	Jack Black, Emily Blunt, Jason Segel	United States	20th Century Fox, Dune Entertainment, Davis Entertainment 20th Century Fox (distribution)		25 December 2010
Harry Potter and the Deathly Hallows – Part 1	David Yates	Daniel Radcliffe, Rupert Grint, Emma Watson, Ralph Fiennes, Helena Bonham Carter, Tom Felton, Alan Rickman, Jason Isaacs, Brendan Gleeson, Helen McCrory, Julie Walters, John Hurt, Toby Jones	United States; United Kingdom	Heyday Films Warner Bros. (distribution)		19 November 2010
How to Train Your Dragon	Chris Sanders, Dean DeBlois	Jay Baruchel, Gerard Butler, Craig Ferguson, America Ferrera	United States	DreamWorks Animation Paramount Pictures (distribution)		26 March 2010
The Last Airbender	M. Night Shyamalan	Noah Ringer, Jackson Rathbone, Dev Patel	United States	Paramount Pictures, Nickelodeon Movies, The Kennedy/Marshall Company, Industrial Light & Magic Paramount Pictures (distribution)		1 July 2010
Legend of the Guardians: The Owls of Ga'Hoole	Zack Snyder	Jim Sturgess, Joel Edgerton, Geoffrey Rush, Hugo Weaving	United States; Australia	Village Roadshow Pictures, Animal Logic, FortyFour Studios Warner Bros. (distribution)		24 September 2010
Nanny McPhee and the Big Bang	Susanna White	Emma Thompson, Ralph Fiennes, Maggie Gyllenhaal	United States	StudioCanal, Relativity Media, Working Title Films, Three Strange Angels Universal Studios (distribution)		20 August 2010
The Nutcracker in 3D	Andrei Konchalovsky	Elle Fanning, Nathan Lane, Frances de la Tour	Hungary; United Kingdom	Freestyle Releasing (USA distribution)		24 November 2010 (USA / limited)
Percy Jackson & the Olympians: The Lightning Thief	Chris Columbus	Logan Lerman, Brandon T. Jackson, Alexandra Daddario, Steve Coogan, Pierce Brosnan	United States	Fox 2000 Pictures, 1492 Pictures, Sunswept Entertainment 20th Century Fox (distribution)		12 February 2010
Prince of Persia: The Sands of Time	Mike Newell	Jake Gyllenhaal, Gemma Arterton, Alfred Molina, Ben Kingsley	United States	Walt Disney Pictures, Jerry Bruckheimer Films Walt Disney Studios Motion Pictures (distribution)		28 May 2010
Rare Exports: A Christmas Tale	Jalmari Helander	Onni Tommita, Jorma Tommila, Per Christian Ellefsen	France; Finland; Sweden; Norway	Icon Film Distribution (UK distribution)		3 December 2010
Red: Werewolf Hunter	Sheldon Wilson	Felicia Day, Kavan Smith, Steven McHattie	Canada	Syfy		30 October 2010
Shrek Forever After	Mike Mitchell	Mike Myers, Eddie Murphy, Cameron Diaz, Antonio Banderas	United States	DreamWorks Animation Paramount Pictures (distribution)		21 May 2010
The Sorcerer's Apprentice	Jon Turteltaub	Nicolas Cage, Jay Baruchel, Alfred Molina	United States	Walt Disney Pictures, Jerry Bruckheimer Films, Saturn Films, Broken Road Productions Walt Disney Studios Motion Pictures (distribution)		14 July 2010
The Strange Case of Angelica	Manoel de Oliveira	Pilar López de Ayala, Ricardo Trêpa, Filipe Vargas	France; Portugal; Spain; Brazil	The Cinema Guild (USA distribution)		29 December 2010 (USA)
Tangled	Nathan Greno, Byron Howard	Mandy Moore, Zachary Levi	United States	Walt Disney Pictures, Walt Disney Animation Studios Walt Disney Studios Motion Pictures (distribution)		24 November 2010
The Tempest	Julie Taymor	Helen Mirren, Felicity Jones, Djimon Hounsou	United States	Miramax, TalkStory Productions, Artemis Films Touchstone Pictures (distribution)		10 December 2010 (limited)
Thomas & Friends: Misty Island Rescue	Greg Tiernan	Ben Small, Martin Sherman, Jules de Jongh, William Hope, David Bedella, Glenn Wrage, Keith Wickham, Teresa Gallagher, Togo Igawa, Kerry Shale, Matt Wilkinson, Michael Angelis, Michael Brandon	United Kingdom	HIT Entertainment		3 July 2010
Three Bogatyrs and the Shamakhan Queen	Sergey Glezin	Sergei Makovetsky, Konstantin Bronzit	Russia			
Tooth Fairy	Michael Lembeck	Dwayne Johnson, Ashley Judd, Julie Andrews	Canada; United States	Twentieth Century Fox, Walden Media, Mayhem Pictures, Blumhouse Productions, Dune Entertainment 20th Century Fox (distribution)		22 January 2010
Toy Story 3	Lee Unkrich	Tom Hanks, Tim Allen, Joan Cusack	United States	Pixar Animation Studios, Walt Disney Pictures Walt Disney Studios Motion Pictures (distribution)		18 June 2010
Trollhunter	André Øvredal	Otto Jespersen, Hans Morten Hansen, Tomas Alf Larsen	Norway			29 October 2010 (Norway)
The Twilight Saga: Eclipse	David Slade	Robert Pattinson, Kristen Stewart, Taylor Lautner	United States	Summit Entertainment, Temple Hill Entertainment, Maverick Films Summit Entertainment (distribution)		30 June 2010
Uncle Boonmee Who Can Recall His Past Lives	Apichatpong Weerasethakul	Thanapat Saisaymar, Jenjira Pongpas, Sakda Kaewbuadee	France; Germany; Spain; United Kingdom; Thailand	Kick the Machine		1 September 2010 (France)
When in Rome	Mark Steven Johnson	Kristen Bell, Josh Duhamel, Anjelica Huston	United States	Touchstone Pictures, Krasnoff Foster Productions Walt Disney Studios Motion Pictures (distribution)		29 January 2010
2011
Beastly	Daniel Barnz	Alex Pettyfer, Vanessa Hudgens, Mary-Kate Olsen	United States	CBS Films		4 March 2011
The Change-Up	David Dobkin	Ryan Reynolds, Jason Bateman, Leslie Mann	United States	Universal Pictures, Relativity Media, Original Film, Big Kid Pictures Universal Pictures (distribution)		5 August 2011
A Chinese Ghost Story	Wilson Yip	Louis Koo, Crystal Liu, Yu Shaoqun	Hong Kong; China			28 April 2011
Conan the Barbarian	Marcus Nispel	Jason Momoa, Rose McGowan, Stephen Lang	United States	Millennium Films Lionsgate (distribution)		19 August 2011
Dawn of the Dragonslayer	Richard McWilliams	Nicola Posener, Philip Brodie, Ian Cullen	United States	Arrowstorm Entertainment Phase 4 Films (USA DVD)		18 September 2012
Drive Angry	Patrick Lussier	Nicolas Cage, Amber Heard, William Fichtner	United States	Millennium Films, Nu Image, Saturn Films		25 February 2011
Gnomeo and Juliet	Kelly Asbury	James McAvoy, Emily Blunt, Jason Statham, Maggie Smith, Michael Caine	United Kingdom	Touchstone Pictures, Rocket Pictures Entertainment One (UK distribution)		11 February 2011
Harry Potter and the Deathly Hallows – Part 2	David Yates	Daniel Radcliffe, Rupert Grint, Emma Watson, Ralph Fiennes, Alan Rickman, Maggie Smith, Helena Bonham Carter, John Hurt, Helen McCrory, Julie Walters, Tom Felton, Jason Isaacs, Robbie Coltrane	United States	Heyday Films Warner Bros. (distribution)		15 July 2011
Hoodwinked Too! Hood vs. Evil	Mike Disa	Glenn Close, Hayden Panettiere, Martin Short	United States	The Weinstein Company, Kanbar Entertainment The Weinstein Company (distribution)		29 April 2011
Hop	Tim Hill	James Marsden, Russell Brand, Kaley Cuoco	United States	Illumination Entertainment, Relativity Media Universal Pictures (distribution)		1 April 2011
Hugo	Martin Scorsese	Ben Kingsley, Asa Butterfield, Sacha Baron Cohen, Chloë Grace Moretz, Helen McCrory	United States	Paramount Pictures, GK Films Paramount Pictures (distribution)		23 November 2011
Immortals	Tarsem Singh	Henry Cavill, Stephen Dorff, Luke Evans, Mickey Rourke, John Hurt	United States	Relativity Media		11 November 2011
Legend of the Millennium Dragon	Hirotsugu Kawasaki		Japan	Sony Pictures Entertainment		29 April 2011 (Japan)
Level Up	Derek Gulley, David Schneiderman	Gaelan Connell, Connor Del Rio, Jessie T. Usher	United States			23 November 2011
Midnight in Paris	Woody Allen	Owen Wilson, Rachel McAdams, Marion Cotillard	Spain; United States	Sony Pictures Classics (USA distribution)		20 May 2011 (limited)
Mural	Gordon Chan	Deng Chao, Sun Li, Yan Ni	China; Hong Kong	Enlight Pictures		29 September 2011 (China)
Night Fishing	Park Chan-wook		South Korea			27 January 2011
One Fall	Marcus Dean Fuller	Marcus Dean Fuller, Zoe McLellan, Seamus Mulcahy	United States			9 September 2011
Passion Play	Mitch Glazer	Mickey Rourke, Megan Fox, Bill Murray	United States			6 May 2011 (limited)
Pirates of the Caribbean: On Stranger Tides	Rob Marshall	Johnny Depp, Penélope Cruz, Geoffrey Rush, Ian McShane	United States			
Puss in Boots	Chris Miller	Antonio Banderas, Salma Hayek, Zach Galifianakis	United States			
Red Riding Hood	Catherine Hardwicke	Amanda Seyfried, Gary Oldman, Julie Christie	United States			
Sex and Zen 3D: Extreme Ecstasy	Christopher Sun	Hayama Hiro, Hara Saori, Leni Lan	Hong Kong			
The Sorcerer and the White Snake	Tony Ching	Jet Li, Eva Huang, Raymond Lam	China			
Les Contes de la nuit	Michel Ocelot		France			
Three Bogatyrs Far Far Away	Konstantin Feoktistov	Sergei Makovetsky, Konstantin Bronzit	Russia			
Thor	Kenneth Branagh	Chris Hemsworth, Tom Hiddleston, Natalie Portman, Stellan Skarsgård, Idris Elba, Anthony Hopkins	United States			
The Smurfs	Raja Gosnell	Jonathan Winters, Katy Perry, Hank Azaria	United States			
Sucker Punch	Zack Snyder	Emily Browning, Vanessa Hudgens, Abbie Cornish	United States			
The Twilight Saga: Breaking Dawn - Part 1	Bill Condon	Robert Pattinson, Kristen Stewart, Taylor Lautner	United States			
The Witches of Oz	Leigh Scott	Christopher Lloyd, Sean Astin, Ethan Embry	United States			
Your Highness	David Gordon Green	Danny McBride, James Franco, Natalie Portman	United States			
2012
Abraham Lincoln: Vampire Hunter	Timur Bekmambetov	Benjamin Walker, Dominic Cooper, Anthony Mackie	United States			
The Amazing Adventures of the Living Corpse	Justin Paul Ritter	Michael Villar, Marshall Hilton, Ryan McGivern	United States	Shoreline Entertainment		July 14, 2012
The Amazing Spider-Man	Marc Webb	Andrew Garfield, Emma Stone, Rhys Ifans, Sally Field	United States			
Beasts of the Southern Wild	Benh Zeitlin	Quvenzhané Wallis, Dwight Henry, Lowell Landes	United States			
Brave	Mark Andrews, Brenda Chapman	Kelly Macdonald, Emma Thompson, Billy Connolly	United States			
Chronicle	Josh Trank	Dane DeHaan, Alex Russell, Michael B. Jordan	United States			
Girl vs. Monster	Stuart Gillard	Olivia Holt	United States			
The Hobbit: An Unexpected Journey	Peter Jackson	Martin Freeman, Ian McKellen, Richard Armitage, Hugo Weaving, Ian Holm, Cate Blanchett, Sylvester McCoy, Christopher Lee	United States; New Zealand			
Hotel Transylvania	Genndy Tartakovsky	Adam Sandler, Selena Gomez, Andy Samberg, Kevin James, David Spade, Steve Buscemi, Ceelo Green, Molly Shannon, Fran Drescher	United States	Sony Pictures Animation Columbia Pictures (distribution)		September 28, 2012
John Dies at the End	Don Coscarelli	Chase Williamson, Rob Mayes, Paul Giamatti	United States			
Journey 2: The Mysterious Island	Brad Peyton	Josh Hutcherson, Vanessa Hudgens, Dwayne Johnson, Michael Caine	United States			
Krishna Aur Kans	Vikram Veturi	Om Puri, Juhi Chawla, Prachi Save	India	Reliance Entertainment		3 August 2012
The Lorax	Cinco Paul, Ken Daurio	Danny DeVito, Ed Helms, Zac Efron, Taylor Swift	United States			
Mirror Mirror	Tarsem Singh	Julia Roberts, Lily Collins, Armie Hammer	United States			
The Odd Life of Timothy Green	Peter Hedges	Jennifer Garner, Joel Edgerton, Ron Livingston	United States			
Painted Skin: The Resurrection	Wuershan	Zhou Xun, Zhao Wei, Chen Kun	China			
ParaNorman	Sam Fell, Chris Butler	Kodi Smit-McPhee, Anna Kendrick, Christopher Mintz-Plasse	United States			
The Pirates! In an Adventure with Scientists	Peter Lord	Hugh Grant, Martin Freeman, Imelda Staunton, David Tennant, Jeremy Piven, Salma Hayek, Russell Tovey, Lenny Henry, Brendan Gleeson, Ashley Jensen, Ben Whitehead	United Kingdom	Family-oriented comedy		
Ruby Sparks	Jonathan Dayton, Valerie Faris	Paul Dano, Zoe Kazan, Elliott Gould	United States			
Snow White & the Huntsman	Rupert Sanders	Kristen Stewart, Charlize Theron, Chris Hemsworth, Ian McShane, Ray Winstone	United States			May 30, 2012 (UK)
The Twilight Saga: Breaking Dawn – Part 2	Bill Condon	Robert Pattinson, Kristen Stewart, Taylor Lautner	United States			
Wolf Children	Mamoru Hosoda		Japan			
Wrath of the Titans	Jonathan Liebesman	Sam Worthington, Liam Neeson, Ralph Fiennes, Rosamund Pike, Bill Nighy	Spain; United States			
2013
47 Ronin	Carl Erik Rinsch	Keanu Reeves, Cary-Hiroyuki Tagawa, Hiroyuki Sanada	United States; Japan			
Avenged	Michael S. Ojeda	Amanda Adrienne, Tom Ardavany, Ronnie Gene Blevins	United States			
Beautiful Creatures	Richard LaGravenese	Alden Ehrenreich, Alice Englert, Emma Thompson	United States			
Epic	Chris Wedge	Colin Farrell, Josh Hutcherson, Amanda Seyfried, Christoph Waltz, Aziz Ansari	United States			
Escape from Tomorrow	Randy Moore	Roy Abramsohn, Elena Schuber	United States			
Frozen	Chris Buck	Kristen Bell, Idina Menzel, Jonathan Groff, Josh Gad	United States			
Hansel and Gretel: Witch Hunters	Tommy Wirkola	Jeremy Renner, Gemma Arterton, Famke Janssen	United States			
The Hobbit: The Desolation of Smaug	Peter Jackson	Martin Freeman, Ian McKellen, Richard Armitage, Luke Evans, Benedict Cumberbatch, Evangeline Lilly, Orlando Bloom, Sylvester McCoy, Stephen Fry	United States; New Zealand			
Innocence	Hilary Brougher	Sophie Curtis, Polina Nikiforova, Daniel Zovatto	United States			
The Mortal Instruments: City of Bones	Harald Zwart	Lily Collins, Jamie Campbell Bower, Robert Sheehan	Germany; Canada			
Jack the Giant Slayer	Bryan Singer	Nicholas Hoult, Eleanor Tomlinson, Stanley Tucci, Ewan McGregor, Ian McShane	United States			
Man of Steel	Zack Snyder	Henry Cavill, Amy Adams, Michael Shannon, Diane Lane, Kevin Costner, Laurence Fishburne	United States; United Kingdom			
Monsters University	Dan Scanlon	Billy Crystal, John Goodman, Helen Mirren	United States			
My Little Pony: Equestria Girls	Jayson Thiessen	Tara Strong, Ashleigh Ball, Andrea Libman, Tabitha St. Germain	United States; Canada			
Oz the Great and Powerful	Sam Raimi	James Franco, Mila Kunis, Michelle Williams	United States			
Percy Jackson: Sea of Monsters	Thor Freudenthal	Logan Lerman, Alexandra Daddario, Brandon T. Jackson	United States			
R.I.P.D.	Robert Schwentke	Ryan Reynolds, Jeff Bridges, Kevin Bacon	United States	Dark Horse Entertainment, Original Film, Relativity Media	Action comedy	17.07.2013
The Secret Life of Walter Mitty	Ben Stiller	Ben Stiller, Kristen Wiig, Shirley MacLaine	United States			
The Smurfs 2	Raja Gosnell	Neil Patrick Harris, Jayma Mays, Hank Azaria (Gargamel)	United States			
Thor: The Dark World	Alan Taylor	Chris Hemsworth, Tom Hiddleston, Natalie Portman, Stellan Skarsgård, Idris Elba, Christopher Eccleston, Anthony Hopkins	United States			
Warm Bodies	Jonathan Levine	Nicholas Hoult, Teresa Palmer, Rob Corddry	United States			
2014
Beauty and the Beast	Christophe Gans	Vincent Cassel, Léa Seydoux, Eduardo Noriega	France			
Bird People	Pascale Ferran	Josh Charles, Anaïs Demoustier, Roschdy Zem	France			
The Book of Life	Jorge R. Gutierrez	Diego Luna, Zoe Saldaña, Channing Tatum	United States			
The Boxtrolls	Anthony Stacchi, Graham Annable	Isaac Hempstead-Wright, Elle Fanning, Ben Kingsley	United States			
Dracula Untold	Gary Shore	Luke Evans, Sarah Gadon, Dominic Cooper, Charles Dance	United States			
Heavenly Sword	Gun Ho Jang	Anna Torv, Alfred Molina, Thomas Jane	United States	Blockade Entertainment		2014.09.02
Hercules	Brett Ratner	Dwayne Johnson, Ian McShane, John Hurt	United States			
The Hobbit: The Battle of the Five Armies	Peter Jackson	Martin Freeman, Ian McKellen, Richard Armitage, Luke Evans, Benedict Cumberbatch, Evangrine Lilly, Hugo Weaving, Orlando Bloom, Cate Blanchett, Sylvester McCoy, Christopher Lee	New Zealand; United States			
How to Train Your Dragon 2	Dean DeBlois	Jay Baruchel, Cate Blanchett, Gerard Butler, Craig Ferguson, America Ferrera, Djimon Hounsou	United States			
I, Frankenstein	Stuart Beattie	Aaron Eckhart, Bill Nighy, Yvonne Strahovski	United States			
In Your Eyes	Brin Hill	Zoe Kazan, Michael Stahl-David, Nikki Reed	United States			
Into the Woods	Rob Marshall	Meryl Streep, Emily Blunt, Anna Kendrick, Johnny Depp	United States			
Kiki's Delivery Service	Takashi Shimizu	Fuka Koshiba, Ryohei Hirota, Machiko Ono	Japan			
The Legend of Hercules	Renny Harlin	Kellan Lutz, Scott Adkins, Gaia Weiss	United States			
Legends of Oz: Dorothy's Return	Will Finn, Daniel St. Pierre		United States			
Lost River	Ryan Gosling	Christina Hendricks, Iain De Caestecker, Matt Smith	United States			
Maleficent	Robert Stromberg	Angelina Jolie, Elle Fanning, Sharlto Copley	United States			May 28, 2014 (USA)
Night at the Museum: Secret of the Tomb	Shawn Levy	Ben Stiller, Robin Williams, Owen Wilson, Rebel Wilson, Ricky Gervais, Ben Kingsley	United States			
One Hundred Thousand Bad Jokes	Lu Hengyu, Li Shujie	Ketsu, Huangzhenji, Bao Mu Zhong Yang	China			
P-51 Dragon Fighter	Mark Atkins	Scott Martin, Stephanie Beran, Ross Brooks	United States	Archstone Pictures		19 August 2014
Premature	Daniel Beers	John Karna, Craig Roberts, Katie Findlay	United States			
Song of the Sea	Tomm Moore		Ireland; Denmark; France; Belgium; Luxembourg			10 December 2014 (FR / BE / LU)
Viy	Oleg Stepchenko	Jason Flemyng, Aleksey Chadov, Valery Zolotukhin	Russia			
WolfCop	Lowell Dean	Leo Fafard, Amy Matysio, Jonathan Cherry	Canada	Urban fantasy		
2015
10000 Years Later	Yi Li	Joma, Yalayam, Yi Li	China			March 27, 2015 (China)
The Age of Adaline	Lee Toland Krieger	Blake Lively, Michiel Huisman, Harrison Ford, Ellen Burstyn	United States			April 24, 2015 (USA)
Baahubali: The Beginning	S. S. Rajamouli	Prabhas, Rana Daggubati, Tamannaah	India			July 10, 2015
The Shamer's Daughter	Kenneth Kainz	Rebecca Emilie Sattrup, Petra Maria Scott Nielsen, Peter Plaugborg, Maria Bonnevie, Søren Malling, Roland Møller, Jakob Oftebro, Stina Ekblad, Allan Hyde, Laura Bro, Olaf Johannessen, Jóhann G. Jóhansson, Adam Ild Rohweder	Denmark			March 26, 2015 (Denmark)
Bicycle Boy	Liu Kexin	Tang Xiaoxi, Zhang Xueling, Lu Zhixing	China			January 1, 2015 (China)
Cinderella	Kenneth Branagh	Cate Blanchett, Lily James, Richard Madden, Stellan Skarsgård, Derek Jacobi, Helena Bonham Carter	United Kingdom; United States			March 13, 2015 (USA)
Digging Up the Marrow	Adam Green	Adam Green, Kane Hodder, Tony Todd	United States			March 24, 2015 (USA)
The Invincible Piglet	Song Zhantao	Cheung Laap Wai, Zhang Zhilu, Norman Chu	China			April 3, 2015 (China)
The Last Witch Hunter	Breck Eisner	Vin Diesel, Rose Leslie, Elijah Wood, Michael Caine	United States			October 23, 2015 (USA)
Monster Hunt	Raman Hui	Bai Baihe, Kai Ko, Sandra Ng	China			July 17, 2015 (China)
Pan	Joe Wright	Levi Miller, Hugh Jackman, Garrett Hedlund, Rooney Mara	United States			October 9, 2015 (USA)
Pleasant Goat and Big Big Wolf – Amazing Pleasant Goat	Huang Weiming	Zu Qing, Zhang Lin, YYY	China			January 31, 2015 (China)
Seventh Son	Sergei Bodrov	Jeff Bridges, Ben Barnes, Julianne Moore	United States; Russia			February 6, 2015 (USA)
Strange Magic	Gary Rydstrom	Alan Cumming, Evan Rachel Wood, Kristin Chenoweth	United States			January 23, 2015 (USA)
Ted 2	Seth MacFarlane	Mark Wahlberg, Seth MacFarlane, Amanda Seyfried, Morgan Freeman	United States			June 26, 2015 (USA)
Three Bogatyrs. A Horse Movement, (, The Three Bogatyrs)	Konstantin Feoktistov	Sergei Makovetsky, Valery Solovyov	Russia			
Xinnian is Coming – Uproar of Chuxi	Yu Mingliang, Yang Xiaojun, Liang Donglong	Zhao Shuting, Fu Jie, Yi Xiaoyin	China			February 19, 2015 (China)
Zhong Kui: Snow Girl and the Dark Crystal	Peter Pau, Zhao Tianyu	Chen Kun, Li Bingbing, Winston Chao	China; Hong Kong			February 19, 2015 (China)
2016
A Monster Calls	Juan Antonio Bayona	Felicity Jones, Liam Neeson	United States			
Alice Through the Looking Glass, Sequel to 2010 film Alice in Wonderland	James Bobin	Johnny Depp, Mia Wasikowska, Anne Hathaway	United States			
Assassin's Creed	Justin Kurzel	Michael Fassbender, Marion Cotillard, Jeremy Irons	United States			
Doctor Strange	Scott Derrickson	Benedict Cumberbatch, Chiwetel Ejiofor, Rachel McAdams, Benedict Wong, Mads Mikkelsen, Tilda Swinton	United States	Marvel Studios		October 13, 2016 (Hong Kong)
Pete's Dragon	David Lowery	Oakes Fegley, Bryce Dallas Howard, Robert Redford, Karl Urban	United States			
Pride and Prejudice and Zombies	Burr Steers	Lily James, Sam Riley, Matt Smith, Bella Heathcote	United States			February 5, 2016 (USA)
The BFG	Steven Spielberg	Mark Rylance	United States			
Fantastic Beasts and Where to Find Them	David Yates	Eddie Redmayne, Katherine Waterston, Alison Sudol, Colin Farrell	United States			
Gods of Egypt	Alex Proyas	Gerard Butler, Nikolaj Coster-Waldau, Brenton Thwaites, Élodie Yung	United States; Australia			February 26, 2016 (USA)
The Huntsman: Winter's War	Frank Darabont	Chris Hemsworth, Charlize Theron, Emily Blunt, Jessica Chastain, Nick Frost	United States			
The Jungle Book	Jon Favreau	Neel Sethi, Bill Murray, Idris Elba, Ben Kingsley, Lupita Nyong'o, Christopher Walken	United States			
Kubo and the Two Strings	Travis Knight	Art Parkinson, Rooney Mara	United States			
Moana	Ron Clements, John Musker	Dwayne Johnson, Alan Tudyk	United States	Walt Disney Animation Studios		November 23, 2016 (USA)
Miss Peregrine's Home for Peculiar Children	Tim Burton	Asa Butterfield, Eva Green, Samuel L. Jackson, Judi Dench	United States			September 30, 2016 (USA)
Trolls	Mike Mitchell	Anna Kendrick, Justin Timberlake	United States			
Warcraft	Duncan Jones	Travis Fimmel, Ben Foster, Paula Patton	United States			
2017
Baahubali 2: The Conclusion	S. S. Rajamouli	Prabhas, Rana Daggubati, Anushka Shetty	India			April 28, 2017
Beauty and the Beast	Bill Condon	Emma Watson, Dan Stevens, Luke Evans, Kevin Kline, Josh Gad, Ewan McGregor, Stanley Tucci, Ian McKellen, Emma Thompson	United States			February 23, 2017 (UK)
King Arthur: Legend of the Sword	Guy Ritchie	Charlie Hunnam, Jude Law	United Kingdom; United States; Australia			
Jumanji: Welcome to the Jungle	Jake Kasdan	Dwayne Johnson, Jack Black, Kevin Hart, Karen Gillan	United States			
Kong: Skull Island	Jordan Vogt-Roberts	Tom Hiddleston, Brie Larson, Samuel L. Jackson, John C. Reilly, John Goodman	United States			
My Little Pony: The Movie	Jayson Thiessen	Tara Strong, Ashleigh Ball, Andrea Libman, Tabitha St. Germain, Cathy Weseluck, Emily Blunt, Kristin Chenoweth, Liev Schreiber, Michael Peña, Sia, Taye Diggs, Uzo Aduba, Zoe Saldaña	United States; Canada			
Pirates of the Caribbean: Dead Men Tell No Tales	Joachim Rønning, Espen Sandberg	Johnny Depp, Javier Bardem, Brenton Thwaites, Kaya Scodelario, Geoffrey Rush	United States	Jerry Bruckheimer Films		
The Shape of Water	Guillermo del Toro	Sally Hawkins, Michael Shannon, Richard Jenkins, Doug Jones, Michael Stuhlbarg, Octavia Spencer	United States			December 1, 2017
Smurfs: The Lost Village	Kelly Asbury	Rainn Wilson, Demi Lovato, Mandy Patinkin	United States			
Thelma	Joachim Trier	Eili Harboe, Kaya Wilkins, Henrik Rafaelsen, Ellen Dorrit Petersen	Norway	Motlys, Film Väst, Snowglobe Film, Filmpool Nord, B-Reel, Le Pacte		15 September 2017 (Norway)
Thor: Ragnarok	Taika Waititi	Chris Hemsworth, Tom Hiddleston, Cate Blanchett, Idris Elba, Jeff Goldblum, Tessa Thompson, Karl Urban, Mark Ruffalo, Anthony Hopkins	United States			October 10, 2017
Wonder Woman	Patty Jenkins	Gal Gadot, Chris Pine	United States			May 15, 2017 (Shanghai)
2018
Aquaman	James Wan	Jason Momoa	United States			
Christopher Robin	Marc Forster	Ewan McGregor, Hayley Atwell, Mark Gatiss, Jim Cummings	United States			August 3, 2018
Fantastic Beasts: The Crimes of Grindelwald	David Yates	Eddie Redmayne, Jude Law	United States			
The Haunted House: The Secret of the Cave	Kim Byung-gab	Jo Hyeon-jeong, Kim Young-eun, Kim Chae-ha, Shin-Woo Shin	South Korea	CJ ENM, Studio BAZOOKA		July 25, 2018
Hotel Transylvania 3: Summer Vacation	Genndy Tartakovsky	Adam Sandler, Selena Gomez, Andy Samberg, Kevin James, Steve Buscemi, David Spade, Keegan-Michael Key, Molly Shannon, Fran Drescher, Asher Blinkoff, Mel Brooks, Kathryn Hahn, Jim Gaffigan	United States			
The House with a Clock in Its Walls	Eli Roth	Jack Black, Cate Blanchett, Owen Vaccaro, Kyle MacLachlan, Renée Elise Goldsberry	United States			September 21, 2018 (USA)
Mandy	Panos Cosmatos	Nicolas Cage, Andrea Riseborough, Linus Roache	Canada; United States	Dark fantasy		January 19, 2018
The Nutcracker and the Four Realms	Lasse Hallström, Joe Johnston	Keira Knightley, Mackenzie Foy, Morgan Freeman	United States			
2019
Aladdin	Guy Ritchie	Will Smith, Mena Massoud, Naomi Scott, Marwan Kenzari, Billy Magnussen	United States	Walt Disney Pictures		
Avengers: Endgame	Anthony Russo, Joe Russo	Robert Downey Jr., Chris Evans, Mark Ruffalo, Chris Hemsworth, Scarlett Johansson, Jeremy Renner	United States	Marvel Studios		April 22, 2019 (USA)
Dumbo	Tim Burton	Colin Farrell, Eva Green, Danny DeVito, Michael Keaton, Alan Arkin	United States	Walt Disney Pictures		
Frozen 2	Jennifer Lee, Chris Buck	Idina Menzel, Kristen Bell, Jonathan Groff, Josh Gad	United States	Walt Disney Animation Studios Walt Disney Studios Motion Pictures (distribution)		
The Haunted House: The Sky Goblin VS Jormungandr	Byun Young-kyu	Jo Hyeon-jeong, Kim Young-eun, Kim Chae-ha, Shin-Woo Shin, Kim Hyeon-ji	South Korea	CJ ENM, Studio BAZOOKA		December 17, 2019
How to Train Your Dragon: The Hidden World	Dean DeBlois	Jay Baruchel, Gerard Butler, Craig Ferguson, America Ferrera, Jonah Hill, Christopher Mintz-Plasse, T. J. Miller, Kristen Wiig, Cate Blanchett	United States	DreamWorks Animation Universal Studios (distribution)		
Jumanji: The Next Level	Jake Kasdan	Dwayne Johnson, Jack Black, Kevin Hart, Karen Gillan	United States			
The Kid Who Would Be King	Joe Cornish	Louis Ashbourne Serkis, Rebecca Ferguson	United Kingdom; United States			
Maleficent: Mistress of Evil	Joachim Rønning	Angelina Jolie, Elle Fanning, Sam Riley, Harris Dickinson, Chiwetel Ejiofor, Michelle Pfeiffer	United States	Walt Disney Pictures		
Shazam	David F. Sandberg	Zachary Levi, Mark Strong	United States			
Toy Story 4	Josh Cooley	Tom Hanks, Tim Allen	United States	Pixar Animation Studios Walt Disney Studios Motion Pictures (distribution)		
