= Thomas & Friends: Blue Mountain Mystery =

2012 film by Greg Tiernan

- Directed by: Greg Tiernan
- Written by: Sharon Miller
- Produced by: Nicole Stinn (Nitrogen); Ian McCue (HiT)
- Starring: Martin Sherman; Ben Small; Keith Wickham; Matt Wilkinson; Steven Kynman; Kerry Shale; David Bedella; Michael Brandon; Michael Legge
- Narrated by: Michael Brandon (US); Michael Angelis (UK)
- Music by: Robert Hartshorne; Peter Hartshorne
- Production companies: HIT Entertainment; Nitrogen Studios
- Distributed by: HIT Entertainment
- Release date: 1 September 2012
- Running time: 62 minutes
- Country: United Kingdom
- Box office: $311,720

Thomas & Friends: Blue Mountain Mystery is a 2012 British fantasy adventure film based on the children's television series Thomas & Friends (1984–2021) created by Britt Allcroft, which was based on The Railway Series (1945–2011) by Wilbert Awdry. It is the seventh film in the Thomas & Friends franchise, following Day of the Diesels (2011). In the film, Thomas the Tank Engine meets a narrow-gauge engine who caused an accident many years ago, and investigates to find the truth to stop him from being banished.

The film stars Ben Small and Martin Sherman as Thomas in the United Kingdom and United States respectively. It also stars Keith Wickham, Teresa Gallagher, David Bedella, Matt Wilkinson, and Michael Brandon. It is one of the last film productions to involve Michael Angelis.

Blue Mountain Mystery began production in 2010, and was finished in 2011. It premiered in Leicester Square, had a limited theatrical release, and was released on DVD in September 2012. It was positively received by critics.

== Plot ==
At the Blue Mountain Quarry where the narrow-gauge engines work, a keystone in Blondin Bridge comes loose, causing the bridge to collapse onto diesel engine Paxton as Rheneas is unable to stop before crossing over it. With Paxton out of action, Sir Topham Hatt sends Thomas to work at the quarry in Paxton's place with Toby taking over Thomas' job. During his time there, Thomas witnesses a small green engine hiding in the quarry. After the others attempt and fail to hide him, Skarloey reluctantly and cryptically informs Thomas that the engine is named Luke, and that he hides in the quarry due to being scared of something he did a long time ago. Thomas promises not to tell anyone else about Luke.

The next day, after Thomas saves Skarloey from being accidentally hit by Rocky the crane, Luke leaves his hiding spot and befriends Thomas. Sir Topham Hatt and Mr. Percival later visit the quarry to inform Thomas that he can return to his branch line, as Paxton has been repaired. Before leaving, Thomas asks Luke what he did to prompt him to hide away. Luke reveals that, when he first arrived on the Island of Sodor, he unintentionally pushed a yellow engine into the sea because he wanted to be unloaded from their ship first. Thomas becomes dedicated to finding out who the yellow engine was, and asks Toby to cover his branch line duties in the meantime.

When Thomas searches the Vicarstown Dieselworks, he finds Paxton telling Devious Diesel about Luke after overhearing Thomas and Luke's conversation. Believing the incident was on purpose, Diesel plans to expose Luke and have him permanently exiled with Paxton's reluctant help. Horrified, Thomas attempts to sneak away, but Diesel notices him and aims to get to Luke before Thomas. When Thomas then visits the Steamworks to ask Victor if he had fixed a yellow engine who fell into the sea, Victor reveals that the yellow engine was him. He explains that the chains holding his wheels in place broke whilst overseas, leaving him unsecured. Victor could not alert the crew due to a language barrier.

Having found the full story, Thomas rushes back to the Blue Mountain Quarry to inform Luke. Luke and all of the narrow-gauge engines scold and abandon Thomas, as he broke their promise by telling others about Luke. When Diesel and Paxton enter the quarry, with the former threatening Luke, Thomas desperately asks Owen the inclined elevator to lift him up to Luke. He loses control on the narrow-gauge track, which he does not fit on, and stops on the edge of a cliff. Luke rescues Thomas and tows him back onto Owen. Sir Topham Hatt and Mr. Percival arrive to scold Thomas as Diesel accuses Luke. Paxton returns with Victor, who forgives Luke and invites him to be renovated at the Steamworks. Hatt forgives Thomas for not working on his branch line in favour of discovering the truth, instead scolding Diesel for jumping to conclusions, and Mr. Percival welcomes Luke onto his narrow-gauge railway.

== Voice cast ==
- David Bedella as Victor
- Michael Legge as Luke
- Steven Kynman as Peter Sam and Paxton
- Ben Small as Rheneas and Owen
- Keith Wickham as Skarloey and Sir Handel
- Matt Wilkinson as Rusty, Winston, and Merrick

=== United Kingdom ===
- Teresa Gallagher as Emily, Mavis, Annie, and Clarabel
- Kerry Shale as Diesel
- Ben Small as Thomas, Toby, Rheneas, and Owen
- Keith Wickham as Edward, Henry, James, Percy, the Fat Controller, and the Thin Controller
- Matt Wilkinson as Rocky, Kevin, and Cranky

=== United States ===
- Michael Brandon as Diesel
- Teresa Gallagher as Annie and Clarabel
- William Hope as Edward, Toby, and Rocky
- Jules de Jongh as Emily and Mavis
- Kerry Shale as Henry, James, Kevin, Sir Topham Hatt, and Mr. Percival
- Martin Sherman as Thomas and Percy
- Glenn Wrage as Cranky

== Production ==
Thomas & Friends: Blue Mountain Mystery was directed by Greg Tiernan and written by Sharon Miller. Additionally, Robert and Peter Hartshorne were recruited to compose the music. Production began in August 2010, and was later completed in 2011. This was one of narrator Michael Angelis's last film roles, prior to his death in May 2020.

== Release and reception ==
Thomas & Friends: Blue Mountain Mystery premiered at the Vue West End cinema in Leicester Square. It had a limited theatrical release on 1–2 September 2012, before being released onto DVD on 3 September.

On the review aggregator website Rotten Tomatoes, the film holds an approval rating of 81% based on 8 reviews. Common Sense Media gave it four stars out of five, calling it a sleuthing story with worthy messages for preschoolers, particularly praising it for its messages.

=== Box office ===
Thomas & Friends: Blue Mountain Mystery grossed $270,383 in the United Kingdom between 31 August and 28 March 2013, along with grossing $87,604 in Hong Kong. On 12 May 2023, it received a re-release in National Amusements theatres across the United Kingdom, earning $41,337, bringing the box office total to $311,720.
