= Glenn Wrage =

American actor and model

- Occupations: Actor, model
- Years active: 1996–present
- Website: glennwrage.com

Glenn Wrage is an American actor and model, who has performed numerous roles in television, film, and video games.

== Career ==
His film credits include Saving Private Ryan, Razor Blade Smile, The First 9 1/2 Days, Thunderpants and Octane.

He is also known for the prominent voices of Cranky and Spencer in the US version of the British children's series Thomas & Friends from 2009 to 2021.

Outside of acting, Wrage also works as a model.

== Filmography ==
=== Film ===
Year	Title	Role	Notes
1998	Saving Private Ryan	Doyle	
1998	Razor Blade Smile	Duelist 1	Jack Ryder
1998	The First 9½ Weeks	Deputy Earl	
1999	The Blonde Bombshell	Steve	
2000	Dead Babies	Soft porn actor	
2002	Thunderpants	Pilot	
2003	Octane	Highway Patrol Cop 2	
2004	Boo, Zino & the Snurks	Zino	
2004	Control	Gibson	
2005	Back to Gaya	Zino	Voice
2006	Running Scared	Special Agent in Charge	
2009	Hero of the Rails	Spencer	Voice, English dub
2010	Misty Island Rescue	Ferdinand, Cranky	Voice, English dub
2010	Spirit of the Forest	Pine, Gordo	Voice, English dub
2011	Day of the Diesels	Cranky	Voice, English dub
2011	Will	American Newsreader	
2012	Cleanskin	Sergeant Glen Conlan	
2012	Gladiators of Rome	Chirone	Voice, English dub
2012	Blue Mountain Mystery	Cranky	Voice, English dub
2013	King of the Railway	Spencer, Cranky	Voice, English dub
2014	Tale of the Brave	Cranky	Voice, English dub
2015	Sodor's Legend of the Lost Treasure	Cranky	Voice, English dub
2016	Thomas & Friends: The Great Race	Spencer, Cranky	Voice, English dub
2018	Big World Big Adventures		
2018	Blue Iguana	Louie	
2019	Cold Pursuit	Kurt	
2023	The Boys in the Boat	Coach Ky Ebright	
2024	Bonus Trip	Max	
2025	Kingdom Come	Batman / Bryce Wayne	Voice
2025	The Family Plan 2	Jessica's Dad	
2026	Crime 101	Andrew	

=== Television ===
Year	Title	Role	Notes
2001	Dark Realm	David	Episode: "Exposure"
2001	The Armando Iannucci Shows		Episode: "Reality"
2002	Airline	Self	
2003	Keen Eddie	Roger	Episode: "Sucker Punch"
2004	Shane	Vet	Episode #1.1
2005	New Captain Scarlet	Various	Voice; 5 episodes
2006	Lola & Virginia		
2008	Chop Socky Chooks	Larry Sumo	Voice; 5 episodes
2009	The Philanthropist	Agent Perry	Episode: "Pilot"
2010–2020	Thomas & Friends	Various	American dub
2010	Dani's House	Director	Episode: "Weird Wednesday"
2011	Doctor Who	Gardner	Episode: "Day of the Moon"
2014	Veep	Joe Thornhill	4 episodes
2022	Cheaters	Tim Regan	
2023	Captain Laserhawk: A Blood Dragon Remix	Pey'j	Voice
2023	The Diplomat	Lewis Quainton	
2024	Rose & Layla	Alex Simmonds	
2026	Red Eye	Craig Stewart	3 episodes

=== Video games ===
Year	Title	Voice role(s)	Notes
2001	Gothic		English version
2005	Constantine		
2005	Battalion Wars	Western Frontier Veteran	
2005	Perfect Dark Zero	Brother Clay	
2008	Mirror's Edge	Mercury	
2010	Aliens vs. Predator	Major Van Zandt	
2012	Total War: Shogun 2: Fall of the Samurai		
2012	007 Legends	Ernst Stavro Blofeld	
2013	Payday 2	Bile	
2013	DmC: Devil May Cry	Additional voices	
2013	Killzone: Shadow Fall	Helghast, Helghast Newsreader	
2014	Transformers: Universe	Triage, Hotwire, Doubletake	
2014	LittleBigPlanet 3	Head Guard	
2015	Batman: Arkham Knight		
2015	Lego Dimensions		
2016	Homefront: The Revolution	Jack Parrish	
2016	Batman: Arkham VR	Joe Chill	
2016	Battlefield 1	Additional voices	
2016	Trials of the Blood Dragon	General Ryback	
2017	Horizon Zero Dawn	Aelund, Conner Chasson, Kikuk	
2017	Ghost Recon: Wildlands	Carl Bookhart	
2017	DiRT 4	Landrush Spotter	
2017	Micro Machines World Series	Additional voices	
2017	Lego Marvel Super Heroes 2		
2017	Xenoblade Chronicles 2	Additional voices	
2018	Call of Cthulhu	Roy Mitchell, Additional voices	
2022	Dying Light 2 Stay Human	Rowe	
2023	Atomic Heart	Additional voices	
2023	Dead Island 2	Rikky Rex, Noah	
2023	RoboCop: Rogue City	Additional voices	
2023	Aliens: Dark Descent	Chief Administrator Hal McDonald, Additional voices	
2024	Dustborn	Sol	
2024	Wizardry Variants Daphne	Additional voices	
2024	Lego Horizon Adventures	Additional voices	
2025	Elden Ring: Nightreign	Traitor	
2025	FBC: Firebreak	Hank	
2025	RoboCop: Rogue City - Unfinished Business	Additional voices	
