= Thomas & Friends: Journey Beyond Sodor =

- Film poster
- Directed by: David Stoten
- Written by: Andrew Brenner
- Based on: Thomas & Friends by Britt Allcroft
- Produced by: Ian McCue; Tracy Baldgon
- Starring: John Hasler (UK); Joseph May (US); Rob Rackstraw; Hugh Bonneville; Jim Howick; Sophie Colquhoun; Lucy Montgomery; Darren Boyd; Colin McFarlane
- Narrated by: Mark Moraghan
- Music by: Chris Renshaw; Oliver Davis
- Production company: Mattel Creations
- Distributed by: Mattel Creations; National Amusements
- Release date: 23 August 2017
- Running time: 75 minutes
- Country: United Kingdom
- Language: English
- Box office: $523,406

Thomas & Friends: Journey Beyond Sodor is a 2017 British animated musical adventure film and the thirteenth feature-length special based on the British television series Thomas & Friends. The film was produced and distributed by Mattel Creations with animation production by Canadian-based Jam Filled Toronto. The film centres on Thomas being held captive in a Steelworks within the mainland after taking a load meant for his friend James.

The film stars John Hasler (UK) and Joseph May (US) as the voice of Thomas, and guest stars such as Hugh Bonneville who plays the role of Merlin. The film also deals with many traits that children have such as autism, through the Experimental Engines.

Initially released in the United States on August 23, the film saw a limited theatrical release in the United Kingdom through National Amusements.

== Plot ==
On his way to deliver a goods train to Bridlington on the Mainland, Henry the Green Engine collides with another train at Vicarstown due to a faulty signal, and has to stay at the Steamworks for repairs. Thomas the Tank Engine is upset that The Fat Controller has chosen James the Red Engine, who has been teasing him, to take the train in Henry's place, thinking that James is Sir Topham Hatt's favourite engine. To prove to James he's Sir Topham Hatt's favourite, Thomas collects the goods train before James does so he can take it to Bridlington himself. However, the Troublesome Trucks distract his driver, causing them to go the wrong way. Along his journey, Thomas meets Beresford, a crane, and two faulty experimental engines, Lexi and Theo, who help him get more coal and water. They also tell him about another engine named Merlin, who believes he has the power to become invisible.

Later, Thomas finds himself at a massive Steelworks factory run by two engines, Hurricane and Frankie, who invite him to stay. The next day, Thomas learns that Hurricane delivered his train to Bridlington overnight and Frankie convinces him to help out at the Steelworks to return the favour. However, they refuse to let Thomas leave and continue to force him to work for them. Thomas escapes during the night and hides with the help of an unseen Merlin. Meanwhile, back on Sodor, James is assigned to work on Thomas' branch line, but he soon grows fed up and decides to go searching for him. He comes across Hurricane, who takes him to the Steelworks.

On his way home the next day, Thomas encounters Beresford again. When he hears Frankie and Hurricane coming, Beresford hides him using his hook, only to see them taking James to the Steelworks. Thomas enlists the help of the experimental engines to rescue James. Theo and Lexi act as a diversion while Thomas and Merlin try to help James escape. The plan goes awry; a chase ensues in the Steelworks in which James is saved but Thomas is almost melted by slag. Hurricane pushes Thomas out of the way, but melts his own wheels. Frankie breaks down crying and explains that she and Hurricane only enslaved Thomas and James because of the overload of work. The experimental engines decide to henceforth join them at the Steelworks. Afterwards, Thomas and James head back to Sodor and apologise to each other.

== Voice cast ==
- Rob Rackstraw as James and Troublesome Trucks
- Keith Wickham as Sir Topham Hatt
- Christopher Ragland as Jem Cole and Troublesome Trucks
- Kerry Shale as Kevin and the Troublesome Trucks
- William Hope as the Troublesome Trucks
- Teresa Gallagher as Annie and Clarabel
- John Schwab as Ulli and a Bridlington Diesel
- Nicola Stapleton as Rosie
- Sophie Colquhoun as Frankie
- Jim Howick as Hurricane
- Darren Boyd as Theo
- Lucy Montgomery as Lexi and Troublesome Trucks
- Hugh Bonneville as Merlin
- Colin McFarlane as Beresford
- Steven Kynman as some Workmen
- Rasmus Hardiker as Phillip
- David Bedella as Victor

=== United Kingdom ===
- John Hasler as Thomas
- Keith Wickham as Edward, Henry and Gordon
- Nigel Pilkington as Percy and Trevor
- Rob Rackstraw as Toby
- Teresa Gallagher as Emily
- Matt Wilkinson as Farmer McColl

=== United States ===
- Joseph May as Thomas
- William Hope as Edward, Toby, and Farmer McColl
- Kerry Shale as Henry and Gordon
- Christopher Ragland as Percy and Trevor
- Jules de Jongh as Emily

== Reception ==
Common Sense Media gave it 3 out of 5 stars, calling it a "suspenseful adventure" with "positive messages, and the addition of some spirited new characters who add fun to the tale." They noted that it was darker than other Thomas films.
