= Martin Sherman =

Martin Sherman may refer to:

- Martin Sherman (dramatist) (born 1938), American dramatist and screenwriter
- Martin Sherman (actor) (born 1971), American actor, director, writer and inventor
