= Thomas & Friends: Tale of the Brave =

2014 British film

- Poster and DVD cover
- Directed by: Rob Silvestri
- Written by: Andrew Brenner
- Produced by: Brian Lynch and Robert Anderson (Arc Productions); Ian McCue (HIT Entertainment)
- Starring: Ben Small (UK); Martin Sherman (US); Keith Wickham; Kerry Shale; Matt Wilkinson (UK); Teresa Gallagher; Jules de Jongh
- Narrated by: Mark Moraghan
- Music by: Robert Hartshorne; Peter Hartshorne
- Production company: Arc Productions
- Distributed by: HIT Entertainment
- Release date: 1 September 2014 (UK)
- Running time: 63 minutes
- Country: United Kingdom
- Language: English
- Box office: $368,729

Thomas & Friends: Tale of the Brave is a 2014 British animated adventure film based on the Thomas & Friends television series. Distributed by HIT Entertainment, it is the second Thomas & Friends film to be animated by Arc Productions. It stars Ben Small and Martin Sherman as Thomas in the UK and US dubs, respectively, in their final roles as the character. Co-stars include Keith Wickham, Kerry Shale, William Hope and Teresa Gallagher, with Tim Whitnall, Clive Mantle and Olivia Colman joining the cast. The film follows Percy the Small Engine, who learns to be brave when Thomas the Tank Engine discovers dinosaur footprints.

Beginning production in late 2013, it was released theatrically and on DVD in the United Kingdom on 1 September 2014.

== Plot ==
Thomas is sent to work at the Sodor clay pits after a bridge on his branch line is closed for maintenance. Whilst hauling a train during a heavy thunderstorm, Thomas discovers footprints on falling rocks during an avalanche. The following day, Thomas retells his findings to Percy and later returns to the clay pits to investigate the footprints. He is quickly stopped by a new steam shovel named Marion, who warns him about the danger caused by the earlier landslides.

When Thomas and Percy meet up at the docks, Percy becomes paranoid that the footprints might be from a monster lurking on Sodor. After departing from the docks, Percy notices something moving towards him in the distance, and runs back to the docks in terror. After emerging from the fog, what Percy saw turns out to be a steam engine nicknamed Gator; his sloping water tanks make him resemble an alligator. Percy remains paranoid later that night, constantly misinterpreting his surroundings for monsters during his mail delivery journey.

Percy meets with Gator at the docks; the latter missed his ship and has to wait for another. Before being sent to collect trucks, Gator tells Percy about a time when he conquered his fear of heights to deliver important supplies to a village. This, as well as some advice about braveness, inspires Percy to confidently take the night-time mail train. That night, James is frightened by Gator, resulting in him speeding away, passing a red railway signal, and crashing into a pond. In retaliation, James plots to scare Percy with a pile of scrap, which resembles a monster, that he found at the scrap yard. The trick works, resulting in Percy fleeing back to the sheds with his mail train. The other engines mock him, with Thomas choosing not to support him due to the vagueness of the footprint situation, leaving Percy feeling betrayed.

The following day, Percy sees Gator once more, who informs him that he is leaving by ship tonight. Thomas soon realises that James was behind the trick and urges him to apologise. James refuses, but begins feeling guilty. That night, Percy plans to run away on a ship with Gator. Thomas deducts where Percy is and rushes to the docks, convincing Cranky to help in stopping the ship. He manages to grab the ship with his hook, but is almost pulled into the sea. The ship returns to the docks before Cranky can collapse, but Cranky informs Thomas that Percy was already unloaded before the ship departed.

James finds Percy at the clay pits and tries to apologise, only to be ignored by Percy. James accidentally causes another avalanche trying to prove he is braver, getting himself stuck whilst trying to reverse, and refuses to go forward out of fear. Percy buffers up and pushes James out of the way of falling rocks, and the two are chased by a continuing avalanche. Percy is swept up in the avalanche and is almost crushed by a falling boulder. Marion catches the boulder before it falls on Percy and discovers the fossilised skull of a Megalosaurus inside. Marion helps Percy to the Steamworks where he is repaired; when he returns, Percy receives and accepts an apology from both James and Thomas. After seeing the fossil on display, Percy rushes to the docks and gets the chance to say goodbye to Gator.

== Cast ==
- Mark Moraghan as the narrator
- Ben Small as Troublesome Trucks
- Keith Wickham as Salty and a shunter
- Teresa Gallagher as Annie and Clarabel
- Jonathan Broadbent as Bill and Ben
- Mike Grady as Sir Robert Norramby
- Bob Golding as some dockworkers
- Tim Whitnall as Timothy and Reg
- Clive Mantle as Gator
- Olivia Colman as Marion

=== United Kingdom ===
- Ben Small as Thomas
- Keith Wickham as Edward, Henry, Gordon, James, Percy, and the Fat Controller
- Teresa Gallagher as Emily
- Matt Wilkinson as Cranky and Kevin
- Steven Kynman as Porter and the dock manager

=== United States ===
- Martin Sherman as Thomas and Percy
- Kerry Shale as Henry, Gordon, James, Kevin, and Sir Topham Hatt
- William Hope as Edward and the dock manager
- Jules de Jongh as Emily
- Glenn Wrage as Cranky
- David Menkin as Porter

== Release ==
Thomas & Friends: Tale of the Brave was screened in over 80 Vue International cinemas in September 2014. The film was released on DVD in the United Kingdom on 1 September 2014, and on Blu-ray in the United States on 16 September the same year.

== Reception ==
=== Box office ===
Thomas & Friends: Tale of the Brave grossed US$368,729 internationally at the box office.
