= The Marksman (2005 film) =

- Official DVD cover
- Directed by: Marcus Adams
- Screenplay by: J. S. Cardone; Andy Hurst
- Story by: Travis Spangler; Tyler Spangler
- Produced by: Donald Kushner; Pierre Spengler; Andrew Stevens
- Starring: Wesley Snipes; William Hope; Emma Samms; Anthony Warren
- Cinematography: Michael Slovis
- Music by: Harry Toyler
- Production companies: Andrew Stevens Entertainment; Castel Film Romania
- Distributed by: Sony Pictures Home Entertainment
- Release date: September 6, 2005
- Running time: 95 minutes
- Country: United States
- Language: English
- Budget: $15 million

The Marksman is a 2005 American action film directed by Marcus Adams. The film stars Wesley Snipes, William Hope, Emma Samms and Anthony Warren. The film was released on direct-to-DVD in the United States on September 6, 2005.

== Plot ==
When the U.S. is tricked into targeting an 'armed' nuclear reactor captured by Chechen rebels, a Chechen leader is killed and rebel leaders capture the nuclear power plant. Painter (Wesley Snipes), a US Special Forces operative, known as 'The Marksman'. Painter and his Spec-Ops team only have a limited amount of time to resolve the conflict before U.S. military forces wade in. However, when things don't go according to plan, Painter suspects that foul play may be afoot.

== Cast ==
- Wesley Snipes as Enter "The Marksman" Painter
- William Hope as Jonathan Tensor
- Emma Samms as Amanda Jacks
- Anthony Warren as Captain Nash
- Peter Youngblood Hills as Hargreaves
- Ryan McCluskey as Rodgers
- Warren Derosa as Orin
- Christiaan Haig as "Hightop"
- Dan Badaru as Gen. Egor Zaysan
- Serge Soric as Andrey Flintov
- Gelu Nitu as Viktor Ivanov
- Matthew Salinger as General Parent
- John Guerrasio as Secretary Cummings
- Ian Ashpitel as Major Devro
- Peter Bradley Swander as Sergeant Hill
- Tim Abell as Lieutenant Carter
- Johnny Myers as Arthur Moffitt
- Vlad Ivanov as Mikhail Beslin
- Mihai Dinvale as Ilya Chikal
- Tania Popa as Valentina Benkova

== Production ==
=== Filming ===
The Marksman was filmed in Bucharest, Romania, in 49 days between August 16 and October 4, 2004.

== Release ==
=== Home media ===
DVD was released in Region 1 in the United States on September 6, 2005, and also Region 2 in the United Kingdom on November 28, 2005, it was distributed by Sony Pictures Home Entertainment.

== Reception ==
=== Box office ===
In the first week The Marksman opened at #11 at rentals chart and earned $1.36 million.

=== Critical response ===
This film generally garnered a very poor rating. Scott Weinberg of DVDTalk said the film is "just as bad as the worst junk piles tossed to guys like Steven Seagal, Dolph Lundgren, and/or Jean-Claude Van Damme.
