= Thomas & Friends: King of the Railway =

2013 film by Rob Silvestri

- Film poster and DVD cover
- Directed by: Rob Silvestri
- Written by: Andrew Brenner
- Produced by: Brian Lynch; Ian McCue; Halim Jabbour
- Starring: Teresa Gallagher; Keith Wickham; Matt Wilkinson; Togo Igawa; Ben Small; Kerry Shale; Jules de Jongh; Bob Golding; Jonathan Forbes; Rebecca O'Mara
- Narrated by: Mark Moraghan
- Music by: Robert Hartshorne; Peter Hartshorne
- Production company: HIT Entertainment
- Distributed by: HIT Entertainment
- Release date: 23 August 2013 (UK)
- Running time: 62 minutes
- Country: United Kingdom
- Language: English
- Box office: $419,914

Thomas & Friends: King of the Railway is a 2013 British animated adventure film that functions as the seventh feature-length special based on the British television series Thomas & Friends. The film was produced and distributed by HIT Entertainment with animation production by Canadian-based Arc Productions, who took over animation from Nitrogen Studios for the series and following specials from then on. It marks the debut of Mark Moraghan as the narrator for both English versions of the series. The movie centres on Thomas in the search for his new friend Stephen, who goes missing during the restoration of Ulfstead Castle.

King of the Railway had a two-day limited theatrical release in the United Kingdom on 23 August 2013 and was released on DVD on 2 September.

== Plot ==
In medieval times, Sodor was a kingdom under the rule of King Godred. One day, Godred's crown was stolen by thieves. Though the thieves were caught, the crown was hidden and considered lost forever.

In present day, Sir Topham Hatt announces to his engines that Sir Robert Norramby, the Earl of Sodor, is returning from his travels around the world for many years. Sir Robert has a project at the ruins of King Godred's castle at Ulfstead, but keeps it secret as a surprise. The engines speculate over what Sir Robert's plan is. Additionally, high-speed engine Spencer has been borrowed by Sir Robert and thus temporarily stays on Sodor. He accepts a race with Gordon, but is unable to compete due to his duties.

Thomas, James, and Percy are assigned to pull a heavy goods train to the castle. Once there, they encounter Jack the front loader, who informs them of the Earl's plans to restore the castle. The Earl tells them that one tall crate has to be taken to the Sodor Steamworks. At the works, the crate is opened to reveal an old and rusty engine: Stephenson's Rocket, referred to as Stephen. The Earl says that he has a "special job" for Stephen but warns Thomas not to tell him just yet. However, upon his restoration, Thomas tells Stephen about the special job to boost his spirits. Stephen gets excited and starts searching Sodor for his new job, but gradually notices the effects of his age. Meanwhile, Gordon and Spencer meet Connor and Caitlin, two streamliners who rival their speed.

Stephen learns of an abandoned mine below Ulfstead and investigates. The Earl tells Thomas, Percy, and James that the castle will be opened to the public as a tourist attraction and that Stephen's special job is to be their tour guide. Stephen reaches the mine but is disappointed to see that the entrance is blocked. Thomas and Percy lose control of some Troublesome Trucks, which drag them downhill and push Stephen into the mine. The impact causes a rockslide to trap him inside, but Thomas and Percy do not notice.

Upon learning that Stephen left the Steamworks, Thomas enlists everyone to help search for him. Inside the mine, Stephen finds an old wooden chest, in which he finds King Godred's crown. Having heard Stephen's last ounce of whistle as he searches the mine entrance, Thomas brings Jack to the mine, who clears the fallen rocks and rescues Thomas from a broken bridge while the latter rescues Stephen. At Ulfstead Castle's opening ceremony, the Earl unveils Godred's golden crown. During the ceremony, Gordon and Spencer accept a race with Connor and Caitlin.

== Voice cast ==
- Bob Golding as Stephen
- Mike Grady as Sir Robert Norramby
- Jonathan Forbes as Connor
- Rebecca O'Mara as Caitlin
- Miranda Raison as Millie
- Ben Small as Rheneas and the Troublesome Trucks
- Keith Wickham as Skarloey
- Teresa Gallagher as Belle, Annie and Clarabel
- David Bedella as Victor
- Togo Igawa as Hiro
- Steven Kynman as Paxton
- Michael Legge as Luke

=== United Kingdom ===
- Ben Small as Thomas and Toby
- Keith Wickham as Edward, Henry, Gordon, James, Percy, and the Fat Controller
- Teresa Gallagher as Emily
- Matt Wilkinson as Spencer, Kevin and Cranky
- Steven Kynman as Jack
- Kerry Shale as Diesel

=== United States ===
- Martin Sherman as Thomas, Percy, and Diesel
- William Hope as Edward and Toby
- Kerry Shale as Henry, Gordon, James, Kevin and Sir Topham Hatt
- Jules de Jongh as Emily
- David Menkin as Jack
- Glenn Wrage as Cranky and Spencer

== Reception ==
Common Sense Media rated Thomas & Friends: King of the Railway three out of five stars. Jeffrey Kauffman of Blu-ray.com called it "a typically sweet and lesson filled adventure," adding that "parents will be able to see every plot 'twist' coming from a country mile off, but younger kids should be delighted in the whimsy and occasional faux danger this outing offers."
