= Kerry Shale =

Canadian actor and writer (b. 1952)

- Born: 4 June 1952 (age 74)
- Occupations: Actor; writer
- Years active: 1978–present
- Website: www.kerryshale.com

Kerry Shale (born 4 June 1952) is a Canadian actor, host, writer based in the United Kingdom. His BBC Radio 4 comedy-drama The Kubrick Test was broadcast in 2020. He is the co-host of Is It Rolling, Bob? Talking Dylan, a podcast about Bob Dylan.

== Early life ==
Kerry Shale was born on 4 June 1952 in Winnipeg, Manitoba, Canada. He was raised in Canada before relocating to the United Kingdom in the late 1970s, where he began his professional acting career in London's West End theatre scene in 1978.

== Filmography ==
=== Film ===
Year	Title	Role(s)	Notes
1983	Yentl	Yeshiva Student	
1985	Runaway Train	Dubbing	Voice, uncredited
1986	Labyrinth	Goblin	Voice
1986	Little Shop of Horrors	Her Assistant	
1987	The Living Daylights	Voice of Necros	
1987	Superman IV: The Quest for Peace	MBC Newscaster	
1989	Asterix and the Big Fight	Unhygienix	Voice
1996	Jude	Showman	
1997	Welcome to Sarajevo	UN Convoy Official	
1998	B. Monkey	Texan	
1998	The Misadventures of Margaret	Librarian	
1999	RKO 281	Bernard Herrmann	
2000	102 Dalmatians	Le Pelt's assistant	
2002	Max	Dr. Levi	
2003	Code 46	Clinic Doctor	
2005	The Jacket	Prosecutor	
2005	Gideon's Daughter	Badalamenti	
2005	The Wedding Date	Clipboard Manager	Uncredited
2006	Manga Latina: Killer on the Loose	Victor La Cruz	
2008	Genova	Stephen	
2009	Universal Soldier: Regeneration	Dr. Robert Colin	
2009	Thomas & Friends: Hero of the Rails	Henry, Gordon, James, Kevin and Sir Topham Hatt	US dub
2010	Thomas & Friends: Misty Island Rescue	Diesel (UK) Henry, Gordon, James, Dash, Harold, Kevin and Sir Topham Hatt (US)	Voice
2010	London Boulevard	Lawyer	Uncredited
2011	Thomas & Friends: Day of the Diesels	Diesel (UK) Henry, Gordon, James, Kevin and Sir Topham Hatt (US) 'Arry, Bert, Norman and Sidney	Voice
2011	Arthur Christmas	UNFITA OPS	Voice
2012	Thomas & Friends: Blue Mountain Mystery	Diesel (UK) Henry, James, Kevin, Sir Topham Hatt, Mr. Percival and some workmen (US)	Voice
2012	A Fantastic Fear of Everything	Harvey Humphries	Voice
2012	Tad, the Lost Explorer	Tadeo Jones and Kopponen	Voice
2013	Thomas & Friends: King of the Railway	Diesel (UK) Henry, Gordon, James, Kevin and Sir Topham Hatt (US)	Voice
2013	The Hundred-Year-Old Man Who Climbed Out the Window and Disappeared	Harry S. Truman	
2013	Hello Carter	Tara Evans	
2014	Thomas & Friends: Tale of the Brave	Henry, Gordon, James, Kevin and Sir Topham Hatt	US voice
2014	Blood Moon	Father Domonic	
2015	Moonwalkers	Mr. White	
2015	Narcopolis	Martin Fox	
2015	The Cannibal in the Jungle	Peter Kalas	
2015	Thomas & Friends: The Adventure Begins	Henry and Gordon	US voice
2015	Thomas & Friends: Sodor's Legend of the Lost Treasure	Henry, Gordon and Kevin	US voice
2016	Thomas & Friends: The Great Race	Henry, Gordon and Kevin (US) Diesel and Scruff	Voice
2017	Thomas & Friends: Journey Beyond Sodor	Henry and Gordon (US) Kevin and the Troublesome Trucks	Voice
2017	Final Portrait	Art Dealer	
2017	The Trip to Spain	Matt	
2018	Show Dogs	Klaus Hochauser	
2018	Thomas & Friends: Big World! Big Adventures!	Henry, Gordon, Harold and Mr. Percival (US) Diesel and Beau	Voice
2019	Angel Has Fallen	Admiral Paul Sebring	
2021	Wrath of Man	Doctor	

=== Television ===
Years	Title	Role(s)	Notes
1981	Sorry!	Gavin	Episode: "The Godfather"
1983	The Comic Strip Presents...	Willy	Episode: "Five Go Mad on Mescalin"
1984	Freud	Otto Rank	Miniseries
1988	The Lion, the Witch and the Wardrobe	Mr. Beaver	6 episodes
1992	A Dangerous Man: Lawrence After Arabia	American Reporter	TV movie
1993	Cracker	Scene of Crime Expert	Episode: The Mad Woman in the Attic: Part 1
1994	The Adventure of the Red Circle	Leverton	Part of the Granada Television series Sherlock Holmes, originally broadcast on ITV on 28 March 1994
1994–96	Budgie the Little Helicopter	Chuck	
1996–98	Dennis the Menace	Gnasher	Voice
2002	Wilf the Witch's Dog		
2007	Holby City	Dr. Costello	Episode: Paranoid Android
2007	Not Going Out	Toby	
2007–10	Roary the Racing Car	Big Chris, Tin Top, Big Christine (US)	Voices
2010–21	Thomas & Friends	Henry, Gordon, James (2009-2015), Dash, Scruff, Max, Farmer Trotter, Mr. Percival and Sir Lowham Hatt (US) Diesel (US; 2015–2021 / UK), Kevin (UK; "Hasty Hannah" only / US), 'Arry and the Troublesome Trucks	Succeeded by Rob Rackstraw as James (US), Michael Brandon, Martin Sherman as Diesel, and Keith Wickham as Sir Topham Hatt
2010	The Trip	Steve's US Agent	2 episodes
2011	Doctor Who	Doctor Renfrew	Episode: "Day of the Moon"
2011–19; 2025–present	The Amazing World of Gumball	Various characters	
2022	The Creature Cases		Voice
2022	The Sandman	Nimrod	3 episodes
2022	Suspicion	Arnold Myerson	
2022	Shakespeare & Hathaway: Private Investigators	Joe Venice	
2023	Best Interests	Dr. David Pankerman	1 episode
2025	Wednesday	Gabe Packard	Episode: "The Devil You Woe"

=== Video games ===
Year	Title	Role(s)	Ref.	Notes
1999	Tomb Raider: The Last Revelation	Werner Von Croy		
2000	Tomb Raider: Chronicles	Werner Von Croy and Von Croy Sr.		
2003	Tomb Raider: The Angel of Darkness	Werner Von Croy, Thomas Luddick, various NPCs		
2003	Dog's Life	Jake, Wayne, Dwayne, additional voices		Writer
2003	Space Channel 5: Part 2	Fuse		
2004	Killzone	ISA Troops		
2008	Hot Shots Golf: Out of Bounds	Fernando, Shigeki Maruyama, Maru-Chan, Clark		
2010	Hot Shots Tennis: Get a Grip	Toshi and Xavier		
2011	LittleBigPlanet 2	Lex Luthor		
2012	LittleBigPlanet PS Vita	Lex Luthor		
2012	Deponia	Rufus, Cletus, Argus		
2012	Chaos on Deponia	Rufus, Cletus, Argus		
2012	The Testament of Sherlock Holmes	Sherlock Holmes		
2013	Lego City Undercover	Chief Marion Dunby		
2013	Puppeteer	Ying Yang and General Dragon		
2014	Transformers Universe	Derail		
2014	Sherlock Holmes: Crimes and Punishments	Sherlock Holmes		
2016	Batman: Arkham VR	Thug 3		
2016	Steep	Radio DJ Larry Miller		
2017	Lego Dimensions	Chief Marion Dunby		
2017	Xenoblade Chronicles 2	Cressidus, Perceval		
2017	The Lego Ninjago Movie Video Game	Rocker, Pilot, Veteran Miner Rambling Man, Bridge Warrior Leader, Blacksmith		
2018	Lego The Incredibles	Additional voices		
2018	Hitman 2	Carl Ingram		
2019	Terminator: Resistance	NPCs		
2020	Serious Sam 4	Filbert		
2020	Someday You'll Return	Daniel		
2025	Tomb Raider IV-VI Remastered	Werner Von Croy		Archived audio
2025	Marvel Cosmic Invasion	Forge, Supreme Intelligence, Professor X, Taskmaster		
