= Thomas & Friends: Misty Island Rescue =

2010 film by Greg Tiernan

- Official poster
- Directed by: Greg Tiernan
- Written by: Sharon Miller
- Produced by: Nicole Stinn (Nitrogen); Denise Green (HIT)
- Starring: Ben Small (UK); Martin Sherman (US); Jules de Jongh (US); William Hope (US); David Bedella (US); Glenn Wrage (US); Keith Wickham; Teresa Gallagher (UK); Togo Igawa; Kerry Shale; Matt Wilkinson
- Narrated by: Michael Angelis (UK); Michael Brandon (US)
- Edited by: Kevin Pavlovic
- Music by: Robert Hartshorne
- Production company: HIT Entertainment
- Distributed by: HIT Entertainment
- Release dates: 3 July 2010 (US); 2 October 2010 (UK)
- Running time: 63 minutes
- Country: United Kingdom
- Language: English
- Box office: $175,885

Thomas & Friends: Misty Island Rescue is a 2010 British animated fantasy adventure film and the fourth feature-length special based on the television series Thomas & Friends. The film was produced and distributed by HIT Entertainment with animation production by Canadian-based Nitrogen Studios. Thomas travels to "Misty Island" in search of Jobi wood before returning home to prepare for the opening of the Sodor Search & Rescue Centre.

Misty Island Rescue was first released in the United States on 3 July 2010 as a limited theatrical release. The special was also given a limited theatrical release in the United Kingdom.

== Plot ==
A new Sodor search and rescue centre is being built for Harold the Helicopter, Rocky the Crane, and a lifeboat; "Jobi" wood imported from Japan is required to build it. All of the engines want to help deliver the Jobi wood. Salty, the dockyard diesel, tells the other engines about Misty Island off the southern coast of Sodor that is perpetually surrounded by mist. Wanting to haul the logs himself, Thomas inadvertently insults Diesel by saying he cannot be useful. In retaliation, Diesel attempts to prove himself by taking the Jobi wood. Thomas chases after him, knowing that he is headed for an unfinished bridge. Diesel almost falls off before being rescued by Thomas, but all of the logs he had fall into the ocean below and are lost. As a reward for saving Diesel, Thomas is given a trip to the mainland. There is no room for Thomas on the ship that he is scheduled to take, so he asks to be carried on a raft chained to the rear of the boat, but the chain snaps and Thomas later wakes up on Misty Island.

Thomas explores the island and soon finds it to be inhabited by the logging Locos: a Climax Class C engine named Ferdinand and two small twins, Bash and Dash, who were sent to the island after causing trouble on the mainland. Sir Topham Hatt receives a call telling him Thomas is missing. A search party is sent to find him, to no avail.

Thomas discovers a logging station and learns that Misty Island is the only place other than Japan that grows Jobi wood. He and the others decide to go back to Sodor with the wood using the tunnel that connects Misty Island to Sodor. Halfway through the tunnel, it caves in on both sides. Thomas finds a hole in the ceiling of the tunnel and puffs steam out through it as a smoke signal, which is seen by the rest of the engines as the mist covering Misty Island clears. Sir Topham Hatt, Edward, Gordon, and James travel to Misty Island via ship while Percy and the garbage dump engine Whiff enter the tunnel. Percy and Whiff charge through the collapse and rescue Thomas and the logging locos. Realising that Edward, Gordon, and James do not know that he is no longer on Misty Island, Thomas returns to the island and reunites with them. Thomas and the logging locos attend the grand opening of the search and rescue centre. Meanwhile, Diesel 10 watches the engines from afar, and vows revenge.

== Voice cast ==
- Keith Wickham as Salty and Captain the Lifeboat
- Togo Igawa as Hiro
- Matt Wilkinson as Diesel 10 (post-credit scene)

=== United Kingdom ===
- Ben Small as Thomas, Ferdinand and Toby
- Matt Wilkinson as Bash, Victor, Rocky, Cranky, Kevin and the Dock Manager
- Keith Wickham as Dash, Percy, Whiff, Edward, Henry, Gordon, James, Harold and the Fat Controller
- Kerry Shale as Diesel
- Teresa Gallagher as Emily

=== United States ===
- Martin Sherman as Thomas and Percy
- William Hope as Bash, Whiff, Edward, Rocky, Toby and the Dock Manager
- Kerry Shale as Dash, Henry, Gordon, James, Harold, Kevin and Sir Topham Hatt
- Michael Brandon as Diesel
- Glenn Wrage as Ferdinand and Cranky
- Jules de Jongh as Emily
- David Bedella as Victor

== Reception ==
Common Sense Media critic, Renee Schonfield gave the film 3 stars out of 5 and said the "latest train adventures are suspenseful but not too scary".

João Paulo Simões of Now Then Magazine described Misty Island Rescue as a "near flawless narrative, in the most traditional sense", and that the greatest achievement of film is how "didactic" it's moral is.

In May 2025, on the Thomas & Friends 80th Anniversary Podcast, Sharon Miller stated that Misty Island Rescue was her favourite Thomas film that she worked on.
