= David Bedella =

American actor (born 1962)

- Born: September 25, 1962 (age 64); Gary, Indiana, U.S.
- Occupation: Actor
- Years active: 1980–present
- Partner(s): Pressley Sutherland (1997–present)

David Bedella (born September 25, 1962) is an American actor. He is best known for his roles in Jerry Springer: The Opera, In The Heights, and & Juliet. He has won three Olivier Awards.

== Early life ==
Bedella was born in Gary, Indiana, on September 25, 1962. He graduated in 1980 from Merrillville High School in Merrillville, Indiana.

== Career ==
After performing in Showboat '81 at Opryland USA, Bedella began eight years of theatre in Chicago from 1982 to 1990. In 1985, he won his first professional acting award, the Joseph Jefferson Award (Actor in a Supporting Role in a Musical) for his performance in A Chorus Line. After several National Tours including Dreamgirls, Jesus Christ Superstar, and 42nd Street, he relocated to New York City in the autumn of 1990 and began what would be 11 years of regional and Broadway work which included the Goodspeed Opera House in 1991 and a tour of La Cage aux Folles. From 1992 to 1995, he played Caiaphas in the 20th anniversary national tour of Jesus Christ Superstar. In 1995, he joined the original company of Smokey Joe's Cafe on Broadway, which he played on and off for five years before leaving to tour the United States in Almost Like Being in Love.

Having relocated to London in 2001, Bedalla won his most famous role in 2002, playing Jonathan Wierus in the first act and Satan in the second act of Jerry Springer: The Opera at the National Theatre. For this role, he received the 2004 Laurence Olivier Award for Best Actor in a Musical. Later that year, he appeared in a recurring role as plastic surgeon Dr. Carlos Fashola in the British medical drama series Holby City. He then played the title role in Hedwig and the Angry Inch and had a 16-month run playing as Frank-N-Furter in the UK tour of Richard O'Brien's The Rocky Horror Show from 2006 to 2007. During that period, he also had minor roles in films such as Batman Begins and Alexander.

In 2008, Bedella played Alexander Molokov in a concert version of Chess at the Royal Albert Hall on 12 and 13 May 2008, and performed in the West End gala performance of Elegies for Angels, Punks and Raging Queens at the Soho Revue Bar. Since 2009, he has provided voices of characters such as Carlos (The Great Race only), Victor, the Mayor of Sodor, and a Cuban man in the British and American dubs of Thomas & Friends. In 2012, he replaced Matt Wilkinson as Victor in the British dub of Blue Mountain Mystery. In 2015, he replaced Keith Wickham as the Mayor of Sodor in the British dub.

From 2009 to 2010, Bedella reprised his role as Frank-N-Furter in the UK tour cast of The Rocky Horror Show. In October 2011, he appeared in a concert of the new musical Soho Cinders at the Sondheim Theatre in London. From 2011 to 2012, he made his pantomime debut as Blackheart in Robinson Crusoe and the Caribbean Pirates at the New Theatre in Cardiff. In 2012, he played Arnold in Harvey Fierstein's Torch Song Trilogy at the Menier Chocolate Factory in London. In 2013, he appeared in the British drama series By Any Means. In 2014, he starred as popstar Frankie Parsons in the episode "Last Gasp" of the British dark comedy series Inside No. 9.

In 2014, Bedella appeared with Bradley Walsh in Peter Pan at the Milton Keynes Theatre and in the fall of that year, he portrayed the title role in a production of Sweeney Todd: The Demon Barber of Fleet Street at the Twickenham Theatre. On 16 January 2015, it was confirmed that he would be joining Mel Brooks' musical The Producers as Roger De Bris. He again reprised his role as Frank-N-Furter in The Rocky Horror Show alongside the show's writer Richard O'Brien.

For several years, Bedella has hosted his own live chat show called David Bedella and Friends, which won the London Cabaret Society's Best Long Running Cabaret Award in 2015. The chat show began at the Alley Cat venue and moved to the St. James Theatre in London, hosting an array of artists from stage and screen. From 2015 to 2017, he starred as Kevin Rosario in the Tony Award-winning In the Heights at the Kings Cross Theatre in London, for which he won a WhatsOnStage Award and his second Laurence Olivier Award for Best Actor in a Supporting Role in a Musical.

In 2017, Bedella recorded two songs for the album Wit & Whimsy – Songs by Alexander S. Bermange, which reached No. 1 in the iTunes comedy album chart. In 2018, he returned to Chicago as part of the cast of the American premiere of Nell Gwynn at the Chicago Shakespeare Theater. In 2019, he originated the role of Lance in the musical & Juliet. The musical made its world debut at the Manchester Opera House and then transferred to London's Shaftesbury Theatre. Bedella subsequently won the 2020 Laurence Olivier Award for Best Actor in a Musical for his performance. This marked his second win in this category and third Olivier win overall. He left the production on 26 March 2022.

Bedella has also partnered with John Linehan in pantomime at the Belfast Grand Opera House in Northern Ireland. In 2023, he reprised his role as Frank-N-Furter in the Adelaide, Melbourne, and Gold Coast legs of the Australian 50th Anniversary Tour of The Rocky Horror Show. In March 2024, Bedella began a run reprising his role as Lance in the Broadway production of & Juliet, marking his return to the Broadway stage. In the summer of 2026, he's set to portray Judge Turpin in Sweeney Todd: The Demon Barber of Fleet Street opposite Ramin Karimloo in the title role at the Birmingham Repertory Theatre.

== Personal life ==
Bedella has been in a relationship with Pressley Sutherland since 1997. In 2001, Sutherland was offered a job as a vicar in London, and convinced Bedella to move there with him by reminding him of the opportunities in the West End. They continue to reside in the city.

== Filmography ==
=== Film ===
| Year | Title | Role | Notes |
|---|---|---|---|
| 2004 | Alexander | Scribe Cadmus | |
| 2005 | Batman Begins | Maitre D | |
| 2009 | Thomas & Friends: Hero of the Rails | Victor (voice) | Direct-to-video |
| 2010 | Thomas & Friends: Misty Island Rescue | Victor (voice) | Direct-to-video |
| 2011 | Thomas & Friends: Day of the Diesels | Victor (voice) | Direct-to-video |
| 2012 | Thomas & Friends: Blue Mountain Mystery | Victor / Cuban Man (voice) | Direct-to-video |
| 2013 | Thomas & Friends: King of the Railway | Victor (voice) | Direct-to-video |
| 2013 | Resting | Harry Boe | Short Film |
| 2015 | Thomas & Friends: Sodor's Legend of the Lost Treasure | Victor (voice) | Direct-to-video |
| 2016 | Thomas & Friends: The Great Race | Victor / Carlos (voice) | Direct-to-video |
| 2016 | Punk Strut: The Movie | Walter Wall Jr. | |
| 2017 | Thomas & Friends: Journey Beyond Sodor | Victor (voice) | Direct-to-video |
| 2017 | This Is Axiom | Sam | Short Film |
| 2018 | A Reel Life | Precious Stone | |
| 2022 | All the Old Knives | Drew Favreau | |
| 2024 | Argylle | Leonard | |

=== Television ===
| Year | Title | Role | Notes |
|---|---|---|---|
| 2003 | Days That Shook the World | Voiceover Artist (voice) | Credited as David Bedalla |
| 2004–05 | Holby City | Carlos Fashola | 19 episodes |
| 2005 | Jerry Springer: The Opera | Warm-up Man / Satan | TV movie |
| 2005 | Blessed | Restaurant Owner-Quentin | Episode: "Just Looking (Stereophonics)" |
| 2009 | Great Performances | Alexander Molokov | Episode: "Chess in Concert" |
| 2009–20 | Thomas & Friends | Victor (voice) | 54 episodes |
| 2013 | By Any Means | Luis Velasquez | Episode: "Episode #1.3" |
| 2014 | Inside No. 9 | Frankie J. Parsons | Episode: "Last Gasp" |
| 2016 | Resting | Bernard | Episode: "Fucked" |
| 2018 | Deep State | Tilson | 2 episodes |
| 2022–23 | Tom Clancy's Jack Ryan | President Charles Bachler | 5 episodes |
| 2024 | Jesus Crown of Thorns | King Herod | 3 episodes |
| 2025 | Sister Boniface Mysteries | Hank Sawyer | Episode: "Biff! Pow! Zap!" |

== Awards and nominations ==
| Year | Awards | Category | Work | Result | Ref |
|---|---|---|---|---|---|
| 2004 | Laurence Olivier Awards | Best Actor in a Musical | Jerry Springer - The Opera | Won | |
| 2004 | WhatsOnStage Awards | Best Actor in a Musical | Jerry Springer - The Opera | Nominated | |
| 2016 | Laurence Olivier Awards | Best Actor in a Supporting Role in a Musical | In The Heights | Won | |
| 2016 | WhatsOnStage Awards | Best Supporting Actor in a Musical | In The Heights | Won | |
| 2020 | Laurence Olivier Awards | Best Actor in a Supporting Role in a Musical | & Juliet | Won | |
