= Thomas & Friends: Day of the Diesels =

2011 film by Greg Tiernan

- Film poster
- Directed by: Greg Tiernan
- Written by: Sharon Miller
- Produced by: Nicole Stinn (Nitrogen); Ian McCue (HiT)
- Starring: Ben Small; Martin Sherman (US); Jules de Jongh (US); William Hope (US); Glenn Wrage (US); David Bedella (US); Keith Wickham; Teresa Gallagher; Kerry Shale; Michael Brandon (US); Matt Wilkinson; Rupert Degas
- Narrated by: Michael Angelis (UK); Michael Brandon (US)
- Edited by: Kevin Pavlovic
- Music by: Robert Hartshorne; Peter Hartshorne
- Production companies: HIT Entertainment; Nitrogen Studios
- Distributed by: HIT Entertainment
- Release dates: July 23, 2011 (Australia); September 17, 2011 (UK)
- Running time: 57 minutes
- Country: United Kingdom
- Language: English
- Box office: $220,509

Thomas & Friends: Day of the Diesels is a 2011 British animated adventure film and the fifth feature-length special based on the British television series Thomas & Friends. It was produced and distributed by HIT Entertainment with animation production by Canadian-based Nitrogen Studios. The film centres on Thomas' best friend Percy, who is tricked by Diesel 10 into helping him take over the Sodor Steamworks.

The movie first premiered in Australia on 23 July 2011 as a limited theatrical release and in the United Kingdom on 17 September, nine days before its DVD release on 26 September.

== Plot ==
During a long, hot summer on Sodor, Thomas spots black smoke rising in the distance; an old farm shed has caught fire. Thomas finds Percy already at the scene attempting to help with the emergency. Suddenly, a new engine named Belle, a BR Standard Class 4 modified with water cannons on her water tanks, extinguishes a fire, but she runs out of water. Thomas and Percy take her to the Steamworks where Sir Topham Hatt congratulates her and says they need another fire engine. Belle suggests a road-rail hybrid fire engine she knows named Flynn and arrangements are made to bring him over from the mainland. Thomas starts to spend more time with Belle and later Flynn when he arrives. Percy feels left out, as well as from everyone else, and is convinced by Diesel, to visit Diesel's friend Diesel 10, at the rundown Dieselworks. Diesel claims that Diesel 10 will be Percy's mentor and new best friend. Diesel 10 informs Percy that Sir Topham Hatt does not care about the state of the Dieselworks, and Percy says he will ask Thomas for help regarding it.

By the time Flynn arrives on the island, Percy attempts to tell Thomas about the Dieselworks, but Thomas disregards this as Sir Topham Hatt asked him to show Flynn around. Feeling left out again, Percy goes back to the Dieselworks the next day and finds out that they lack a working crane. So, Percy goes to the Steamworks to tell Kevin about his dilemma and convinces Kevin to be the Dieselworks' crane. However, Thomas breaks the conversation to tell Percy that Flynn's hose is missing and that he must find it. While searching for it, Percy sees Flynn in his berth at Tidmouth Sheds next to Thomas, which makes Percy feel even more left out and sad. Forgetting about the hose, Percy takes Kevin to the Dieselworks while Victor is asleep, and Diesel 10 is happy to have a new crane.

Diesel 10 tells Percy to bring Thomas to the Dieselworks so they can have his full attention. Percy goes to Knapford Station the next day, where Gordon informs everyone that Kevin is missing, and Thomas tells Percy to inform Victor about moving Kevin. Percy has Thomas go to the Dieselworks himself to get Kevin, and Victor informs Sir Topham Hatt. Percy returns to the Dieselworks followed by Thomas. Diesel 10 puts Thomas in the back shed and the diesels go to the Steamworks so they can take it over. Percy is horrified to learn that Diesel 10 has been manipulating him, realizing that Thomas is his best friend and not Diesel 10. Percy returns to the Dieselworks and finds a fire in the main shed; he races to the Rescue Centre for Belle and Flynn, though Flynn does not have his hose. They return to the Dieselworks where Thomas and Kevin are being held hostage.

Percy frees Thomas and Kevin, and Belle and Flynn successfully put out the fire. Thomas, Percy, and Kevin rally the other engines to take back the Steamworks, where the diesels have wreaked havoc. The steam engines promise Diesel 10 that they will help him fix the Dieselworks. Sir Topham Hatt arrives, and orders Diesel 10 to fix the damage. Percy, Thomas, and Kevin tell Sir Topham Hatt all about the Dieselworks, and he says that he had already been planning to fix it. The steam engines and diesel engines then work together to fix the Dieselworks. Sometime later, Sir Topham Hatt reopens it, and Thomas and Percy reconcile.

== Voice cast ==
- Matt Wilkinson as Diesel 10
- Keith Wickham as Den, Salty, Paxton, and Dowager Hatt
- Teresa Gallagher as Belle
- Kerry Shale as 'Arry, Bert, Norman and Sidney
- Rupert Degas as Flynn and Dart

=== United Kingdom ===
- Ben Small as Thomas and Toby
- Keith Wickham as Percy, Edward, Henry, Gordon, James, and the Fat Controller
- Kerry Shale as Diesel
- Matt Wilkinson as Kevin, Stanley, Victor, Rocky, Cranky and Farmer McColl
- Teresa Gallagher as Emily, Mavis and Lady Hatt

=== United States ===
- Martin Sherman as Thomas and Percy
- Michael Brandon as Diesel
- Kerry Shale as Henry, Gordon, James, Stanley, Kevin and Sir Topham Hatt
- Jules de Jongh as Emily, Mavis and Lady Hatt
- William Hope as Edward, Toby, Rocky and Farmer McColl
- David Bedella as Victor
- Glenn Wrage as Cranky

== Release ==
The film was released on DVD in the United States by Lionsgate Home Entertainment on 6 September 2011.

== Reception ==
Renee Longstreet of Common Sense Media gave the film 3 stars out of 5, stating the film "offers standard Thomas fare". DVD Talk said in their review, "If your kid is tough enough to brave the spooky Dieselworks...there's two things that they probably won't be able to escape - Disinterest and boredom.", adding that the film is "(t)ruly a disappointment."
