= Michael Legge (actor) =

British actor

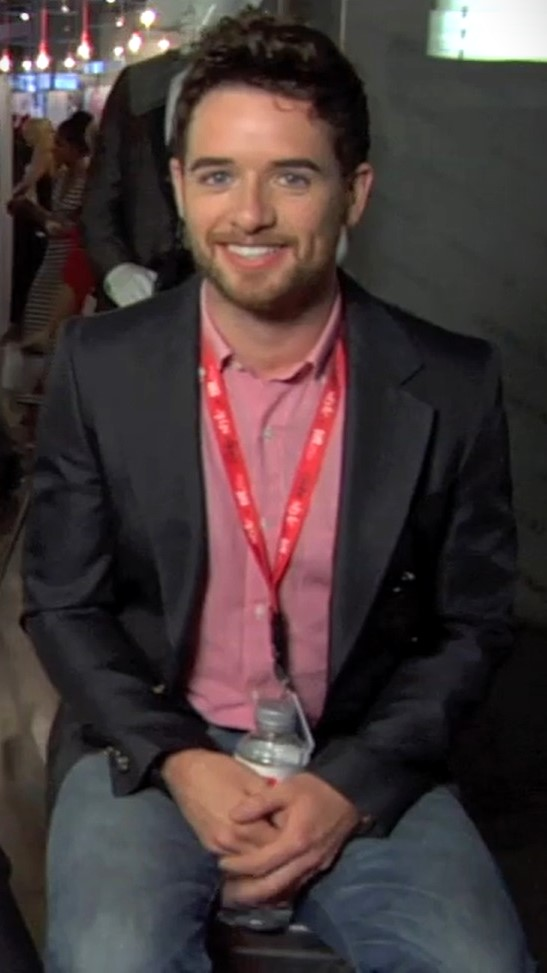
- Legge in 2013
- Born: Newry, Northern Ireland, UK
- Occupation: Actor
- Years active: 1996–2017
- Awards: 1

Michael Legge is a former actor from Northern Ireland.

== Early life and education ==
Michael Legge attended St Colman's College, Newry, where he was a contemporary of fellow Irish professional actor Kevin Trainor; both performed, aged 11, on the main Olivier stage of the National Theatre, London in 1990 as part of the National Theatre Challenge.

== Career ==
Legge appeared in a number of stage, film, television, and radio roles.

He is best known for playing the teenage Frank McCourt in Alan Parker's 1999 film, Angela's Ashes. He also played another Limerick character in the film Cowboys & Angels.

== Post-acting career ==
In 2017, Legge quit acting to move to Copenhagen and become a life coach.

== Filmography ==
=== Film ===
Year	Title	Role	Notes
1998	Soft Sand, Blue Sea	Store Guard	
1999	Straydogs	Niko	
1999	Whatever Happened to Harold Smith?	Vince Smith	
1999	Angela's Ashes	Older Frank McCourt	
2000	Girls from H.A.R.M.		
2003	Cowboys & Angels	Shane Butler	
2009	Sam and Jenny Go to a Play	Sam	
2011	Whole Lotta Sole	Randy	
2012	Mute	Hitchhiker	
2012	Tower Block	Jeff	
2012	Pop	Dr Bark	
2012	Tristan and the Golden Lion	Tristan Dieter Potter	Voice
2012	The Fitz-Caymen Experiment	Paul Diagio	Voice
2012	Blue Mountain Mystery	Luke	Voice
2013	King of the Railway	Luke	Voice
2013	The Stag	Little Kevin	

=== Theatre ===
Year	Title	Role	Theatre
2000	Cressida	Stephen Hammerton	Albery Theatre, London
2001	Presence	Pete	Jerwood Theatre, London
2002	Plasticine	Maksim	Royal Court Theatre, London
2003	Habeas Corpus		Waltham Theatre, London
2004/5	His Dark Materials	Will Parry	National Theatre, London
2006	Southwark Fair	Aurek	National Theatre, London
2008	Treasure Island	Jim Hawkins	Theatre Royal Haymarket, London
2009	Observe the Sons of Ulster Marching Towards the Somme	Martin Crawford	Hampstead Theatre, London
2012	My Cousin Rachel	Philip Ashley	Gate Theatre, Dublin
2014	Of Mice and Men	George	Birmingham Repertory Theatre, Birmingham

=== Television ===
Year	Title	Role	Episode
1996	The Precious Blood	John Willis	
1997/8	Dream Team	Conor McCarthy	1.01 – 1.64
2000	The Rosie O'Donnell Show	Michael Legge	21 January 2000
2002	On Home Ground	John King	2.1
2004	The Big Bow Wow	Frank	All
2004	Dunkirk	LCpl Wilf Saunders	
2004	Omagh	Michael Barrett	
2007–09	Shameless	PC Tom O'Leary	Series 4 to 6
2011	Outcasts	Tipper Malone	1.1–1.8
2013–2014; 2017	Thomas & Friends	Luke	Series 17-18; 21
2013	London Irish	Aidan	1.6
2013	The Bible	Stephen	2

== Awards and nominations ==
Year	Award	Category	Nominated work	Result
2000	Young Artist Awards	Best Performance in an International Film: Young Performer	Angela's Ashes	Nominated
2001	London Critics Circle Film Awards	British Newcomer of the Year	Angela's Ashes	Nominated
2004	Outtakes Dallas	Best Actor	Cowboys & Angels	Won
