= Cowboys & Angels =

- Directed by: David Gleeson
- Written by: David Gleeson
- Produced by: Nathalie Lichtenthaeler
- Starring: Michael Legge; Allen Leech; Amy Shiels; David Murray; Frank Kelly
- Cinematography: Volker Tittel
- Edited by: Andrew Bird
- Music by: Stephen McKeon
- Production companies: Wide Eye Films; Peter Stockhaus Filmproduktion; Grosvenor Park Productions
- Distributed by: Buena Vista International (Ireland); Salzgeber & Company Medien (Germany)
- Release date: 14 May 2003
- Running time: 89 minutes
- Countries: Ireland; Germany; United Kingdom
- Language: English

Cowboys & Angels is a 2003 comedy-drama film directed by David Gleeson. Set in Limerick, the film stars Michael Legge as Shane and Allen Leech as Vincent, Shane's gay roommate. It was released on May 14, 2003.

== Plot ==
The story concerns a hapless civil servant Shane (Michael Legge) who gets more than he bargained for when he moves into an apartment with Vincent (Alan Leech), a gay fashion student. The film sets out to explore the difficulties faced by young people in keeping their identities in a fast moving culture of drugs and clubs.

Shane strikes up a friendship with Jerry (Frank Kelly) an elderly civil servant who implores Shane to do more with his life. Shane though is attracted to Vincent's flamboyant easy-going lifestyle. Vincent plans to finish fashion college and move to New York to work on his own fashion line. He takes the uptight Shane under his wing and encourages him to relax more. The two become fast friends but Shane's life begins to spiral out of control when he gets involved with a botched drug run.

Things come to a climax when Jerry passes away and the botched drug run catches up with him. Both Vincent and Shane get arrested for drug possession in a Garda raid. Vincent panics as a drug conviction will end his dream of going to New York while Shane fears it will see him laid off from the Civil Service. Just as all seems lost the Guard on duty arrives and Vincent recognises the Garda as a married man he was seeing previously. The charges are dismissed and both Vincent and Shane are released.

The death of Jerry and the incident with the Gardaí force Shane to decide a change is warranted. Vincent encourages him to enter art school and the film ends with Vincent boarding a plane bound for New York while Shane enters art school.

== Cast and crew ==
Selected cast list
Character	Actor/Actress
Shane Butler	Michael Legge
Vincent Cusack	Allen Leech
Frankie	Sean Power
Gemma	Amy Shiels
Keith	David Murray
Jerry	Frank Kelly
Inspector	Nigel Mercier
Raid Garda 2	Mike Finn

Selected crew list
Position	Held by
Director	David Gleeson
Writer	David Gleeson
Producer	James Flynn
Producer	Brendan McCarthy
Producer	Nathalie Lichtenthaeler
Producer	Peter Stockhaus
Producer	Chris Chrisafis
Casting	Gillian Reynolds
Casting	Greg McCarthy

== Reception ==
On the review aggregator website Rotten Tomatoes, 57% of 21 critics' reviews are positive. Metacritic, which uses a weighted average, assigned the film a score of 51 out of 100, based on 13 critics, indicating "mixed or average" reviews.

Robert Koehler of Variety wrote, "As helmer, Gleeson doesn't yet have a full grasp of atmospherics, but he and editor Andrew Bird exert terrific control, economically packing in a lot of story in less than 90 minutes. Production package is aces above and below the line."
