= Thomas & Friends: The Great Race =

2016 film directed by David Stoten

- Directed by: David Stoten
- Written by: Andrew Brenner
- Based on: Thomas & Friends by Britt Allcroft
- Produced by: Ian McCue; Robert Anderson; Lynda Craigmyle; Jane Sobol
- Starring: Tina Desai; Kerry Shale; Keith Wickham; Rufus Jones; Rasmus Hardiker; John Schwab
- Narrated by: Mark Moraghan
- Music by: Chris Renshaw; Oliver Davis; Andrew Brenner
- Production company: Arc Productions
- Distributed by: HIT Entertainment; National Amusements
- Release date: May 21, 2016 (UK)
- Running time: 60 minutes
- Country: United Kingdom
- Language: English
- Box office: $3.6 million

Thomas & Friends: The Great Race is a 2016 British animated musical comedy film based on the British television series Thomas & Friends. It was produced and distributed by HIT Entertainment with animation production by Canadian-based Arc Productions. It centres on Thomas the Tank Engine aiming to prove that he is worthy of competing in the Great Railway Show.

The film stars the cast from the television series alongside special guest stars Tina Desai as Indian engine Ashima, Rufus Jones as the real-life locomotive Flying Scotsman, and John Schwab as Vinnie.

Thomas & Friends: The Great Race was given a limited theatrical release on 21 May 2016 in the United Kingdom through National Amusements before being released on DVD.

== Plot ==
Thomas the Tank Engine meets Gordon the Big Engine's brother, the Flying Scotsman, who is to compete in a race at the Great Railway Show, a series of rail competitions on the mainland; he encourages Thomas to try entering as well. Although every engine on the Island of Sodor wants to take part, Thomas fears he will not be chosen. Thomas tries several attempts to convince Sir Topham to choose him, such as becoming a streamliner to enter the race. When he vaguely phrases this idea to Sir Topham Hatt, the latter instead chooses Gordon to be streamlined. Thomas then proposes being repainted to enter the contest for "best decorated engine", but Sir Topham Hatt instead uses his idea for James and Emily.

At Brendam Docks, Thomas has a run-in with most of the competitors for the Great Railway Show when their rail ferry docks there by mistake, and as a result, one of them is left behind. Ashima—a decorated tank engine from India—accidentally bumps Thomas in her hurry to the ferry, nearly pushing him over the edge into the water. Smitten after she rescues him, Thomas quickly leaves the docks. Ashima is lost and the other engines are too busy to help her, and Thomas becomes jealous when he sees her performing his passenger train duties that he abandoned.

Meanwhile, Diesel devises a trick that involves disguising Paxton, Den, and Dart as trucks to fool Sir Topham into entering him into the shunting competition instead of Henry. Ashima tells Thomas he does not need to change himself and suggests he should partake in the shunting competition. Thomas tries moving Diesel's train to practise shunting, resulting in a crash. Sir Topham reveals he was planning to enter Thomas into the shunting challenge the whole time, but because of his needed repairs, Percy the Small Engine shall take his place. Once they leave, Thomas hurries to the competition after discovering that Gordon has not had his safety valve installed. At the Dieselworks, Diesel berates Paxton, Den, and Dart for the failed trick, then accidentally gets himself stuck in a crate.

The Great Railway Show is a disaster for Sodor's representatives; Henry, James, and Emily lose their respective competitions, and Gordon is eliminated from the race when his boiler explodes. With Percy's insistence, Thomas retakes his place in the shunting competition but sacrifices his win to Ashima to save her from crashing into a derailed flatbed. However, the judges decide to award Thomas and Ashima a tie for good sportsmanship.

With the Railway Show over, Thomas invites Ashima to come back to Sodor with him, allowing them to spend some more time together before catching her ship back to India from there. Diesel, still trapped inside the crate, is mistakenly loaded onto a ship heading away from Sodor. The diesels and Cranky the Crane watch him depart from the docks.

== Voice cast ==
- Mark Moraghan as Narrator
- Tina Desai as Ashima
- Rufus Jones as Flying Scotsman
- Kerry Shale as Diesel and Scruff
- Keith Wickham as Salty, Den, Norman, Stafford, Skarloey, Sir Handel, Bert, Sir Topham Hatt and some workmen
- Rob Rackstraw as Donald, Axel, Raul, Carlos, Etienne, Ivan, Flynn and Nigel the Railway Show Commentator
- Teresa Gallagher as Belle, Gina, Frieda, Daisy, Marion, Annie and Clarabel
- Jonathan Broadbent as Bill and Ben
- David Bedella as Victor
- Joe Mills as Douglas and Oliver
- Bob Golding as Stephen and Sidney
- Jonathan Forbes as Connor
- Rebecca O'Mara as Caitlin
- Robert Wilfort as Samson and Great Railway Show Judge
- Steven Kynman as Duck, Charlie, Dart, Paxton and Peter Sam
- John Hasler as Rheneas
- Tim Whitnall as Timothy and Mike
- Rasmus Hardiker as Philip
- Tom Stourton as Rex
- John Schwab as Vinnie
- David Menkin as Porter

=== United Kingdom ===
- John Hasler as Thomas
- Nigel Pilkington as Percy
- Keith Wickham as Edward, Henry, Gordon and James
- Teresa Gallagher as Emily
- Matt Wilkinson as Spencer, Stanley, Cranky, Kevin and the dock manager

=== United States ===
- Joseph May as Thomas
- Christopher Ragland as Percy
- Rob Rackstraw as James and Stanley
- Kerry Shale as Henry, Gordon and Kevin
- William Hope as Edward and the dock manager
- Jules de Jongh as Emily
- Glenn Wrage as Spencer and Cranky

== Songs ==
- "Will You Won't You" – Full company
- "Streamlining" – Thomas, Annie and Clarabel
- "Full of Surprises" – Diesel
- "You Can Only Be You" – Thomas and Ashima
- "The Shooting Star is Coming Through" (reprise of "Streamlining") – Gordon
- "Be Who You Are, and Go Far" (partial reprise of "You Can Only Be You") – Full company
- "He's Full of Surprises" (reprise of "Full of Surprises") – Ian McCue, Oliver Davis, Andrew Brenner and David Stoten

== Production ==
Thomas & Friends: The Great Race was produced and distributed by HIT Entertainment with animation production by Canadian-based Arc Productions. It stars John Hasler (UK) and Joseph May (US) as the voice of Thomas, alongside special guest stars Tina Desai as Indian engine Ashima; Rufus Jones as a depiction of the iconic real-life locomotive Flying Scotsman; and John Schwab as Vinnie, an American engine. These new additions were made by Mattel to add more international and female characters to the cast.

== Release ==
Thomas & Friends: The Great Race was given a limited theatrical release on 21 May 2016 in the United Kingdom through National Amusements before being released on DVD. It was released theatrically or straight-to-video depending on the country.

== Reception ==
=== Box office ===
Thomas & Friends: The Great Race ranked tenth in its opening weekend, grossing $214,133 from 292 theaters with an average of $733 per theater. It decreased 77.1% and fell to 19th in its sophomore weekend, grossing $48,944 from 205 theaters with an average of $238 per theater. The film ranked in 18th, 26th, and 27th place in its 3rd, 4th, and 5th weekends.

The film was re-released in China on 22 September 2017 and in South Korea on 30 November 2017. The film had a strong debut in China, ranking fifth in its first weekend and grossing $1.6 million. In its sophomore weekend, the film dropped 86.5% to 13th place, grossing $227,528. The film was less successful in South Korea, ranking 12th in its first weekend with $68,820 from 249 theaters, with an average of $276 per theater.

=== Critical response ===
Renee Schonfeld of Common Sense Media awarded the film 3 out of 5 stars, writing, "Entertaining train tale with mild peril, positive messages". Leslie Felperin, writing for The Guardian, wrote "Thomas gets a Jackson Pollock paint job but this CGI phase of the animated train franchise doesn't measure up to the original low-tech shows".
