= Thomas & Friends: Sodor's Legend of the Lost Treasure =

- Directed by: David Stoten
- Screenplay by: Andrew Brenner
- Produced by: Ian McCue; Jennifer Hill
- Starring: John Hasler; Joseph May; John Hurt; Jamie Campbell Bower; Eddie Redmayne; Keith Wickham; Olivia Colman; William Hope; Kerry Shale; Rob Rackstraw
- Narrated by: Mark Moraghan
- Edited by: Matthew Ahrens
- Music by: Robert Hartshorne; Peter Hartshorne
- Production company: HIT Entertainment
- Distributed by: HIT Entertainment
- Release date: 17 July 2015 (United Kingdom)
- Running time: 60 minutes
- Country: United Kingdom
- Language: English
- Box office: $3.4 million

Thomas & Friends: Sodor's Legend of the Lost Treasure is a 2015 British animated fantasy adventure film and the ninth feature-length special in the Thomas & Friends television series. The film is produced by HIT Entertainment with animation production by Arc Productions. The film follows Thomas as he unwillingly gets caught in a conspiracy to steal the recently discovered pirate treasure whilst trying to regain the trust of Sir Topham Hatt. The film stars John Hasler and Joseph May as the voice of Thomas, alongside special guest stars Sir John Hurt as Sailor John, the film's main antagonist and Eddie Redmayne as the purple tank engine Ryan, and Jamie Campbell Bower as Skiff the sailboat.

The film received a limited theatrical release in the United Kingdom in July 2015. It was met with generally positive reviews from critics.

== Plot ==
Thomas the Tank Engine wins a race against Bertie the Bus, who mentions that a new branch line is being built. This concerns Annie and Clarabel, who fear Thomas's branch line may be closed down. The next morning, Thomas plays a cheeky prank on Gordon the Big Engine which causes a derailment. As punishment for his misbehaviour, Sir Topham Hatt reassigns Thomas to assist in construction of the new branch line, while the new tank engine Ryan takes over Thomas's regular duties in the meantime.

At the construction site, part of the ground subsides beneath the new track. Thomas misses the caution signs and falls into a cavern where he finds a pirate ship. He tries to tell Sir Topham Hatt about the ship, but he thinks Thomas is making excuses. Rocky the crane is instead credited with discovering the ship, which is put on display at Arlesburgh Harbour.

Thomas meets Sailor John and his boat Skiff, the latter of whom has been fitted with wheels that allow him to travel on rails. John says he is looking for treasure, but he is hesitant to give Thomas details. The next day, Thomas neglects to tell Ryan about a faulty coal hopper, which leads to Ryan's wagons full of dynamite igniting after Ryan fills up with the coal. Thomas saves Ryan and disposes of the dynamite, but Hatt is once again enraged with him, thinking that he was chasing Ryan with the dynamite, and punishes him by confining him to his shed for the rest of the afternoon.

Marion the steam shovel finds a treasure chest full of gold and jewellery, which Sir Topham Hatt keeps in his office overnight intending to donate it to a museum. Thomas meets a furious John, who demands the treasure be handed over. Thomas says Sir Topham Hatt has the treasure and rightfully refuses to help John take it. That night, John breaks into Sir Topham Hatt's office and steals the treasure, using Skiff and the pirate ship as his getaway. Thomas chases them through a junction where the minimum-gauge engines slow the ship by derailing their open wagons. A loose rope is caught on Ryan, who derails the flatbed carrying the ship, leaving John with only Skiff and the treasure.

At Arlesburgh Harbour, Thomas tries derailing Skiff to no avail. At the rail-boat launch ramp, John rows Skiff out to sea, and Thomas ends up partially submerged. Skiff knocks John and the treasure overboard. The treasure sinks to the bottom of the harbour, and John is arrested by the police. Thomas is rescued and attempts to apologise to Sir Topham, realizing he will be furious with him again. Instead, Sir Topham Hatt is proud of Thomas as Ryan had explained everything to him, and he assures Thomas that he will always be his "number one engine".

When the branch line is completed, Sir Topham Hatt gives Thomas his old branch line job back, and lets him cut the ribbon to the new branch line, which he entrusts to Daisy the Diesel Railcar. The treasure is recovered and, now free of Sailor John, Skiff gives rail-boat tours of Arlesburgh Harbour.

== Voice cast ==
- Keith Wickham as Salty, Bert, Sir Topham Hatt, Bertie, and additional roles
- Eddie Redmayne as Ryan
- Jamie Campbell Bower as Skiff
- John Hurt as Sailor John
- Steven Kynman as Duck
- Joe Mills as Donald, Douglas, Oliver, and Toad
- Olivia Colman as Marion
- Tim Whitnall as Mike and Oliver the Excavator
- Teresa Gallagher as Daisy, Annie, Clarabel, and some children
- Tom Stourton as Rex
- Jonathan Broadbent as Bill and Ben
- Nathan Clarke as Alfie
- David Bedella as Victor

=== United Kingdom ===
- John Hasler as Thomas
- Keith Wickham as Edward, Henry, Gordon, James, and Percy
- Rob Rackstraw as Toby
- Teresa Gallagher as Emily
- Matt Wilkinson as Cranky, and Kevin
- Steven Kynman as Jack

=== United States ===
- Joseph May as Thomas
- William Hope as Edward and Toby
- Kerry Shale as Henry, Gordon, and Kevin
- Rob Rackstraw as James
- Christopher Ragland as Percy
- Jules de Jongh as Emily
- Glenn Wrage as Cranky
- David Menkin as Jack

== Reception ==
=== Box office ===
The film grossed £889,927 in the UK, US$72,928 in Hong Kong and US$2,510,062 in China for a total of $3,472,917 worldwide.

=== Critical response ===
On the review aggregator website Rotten Tomatoes, 80% of 5 critics' reviews are positive. Andrew Pulver of The Guardian gave the film a 3/5 stating, "Like Tale of the Brave, Lost Treasure jams locomotive action together with a pop motif supposedly beloved of kids: Brave had dinosaurs, Treasure has pirates." Renee Schonfeld of Common Sense Media gave it two out of five stars, writing that it has "more suspense, peril, and potential scares than usual".
