= Christopher Ragland =

American actor

- Born: Christopher Glynn Ragland; Winnetka, Illinois, U.S.
- Occupation: Actor
- Years active: 2008–present
- Spouse: Rachael Miller

Christopher Glynn Ragland is an American actor based in London, England, who is best known for his roles in the Thomas & Friends series from 2015 to 2021.

== Early life ==
Ragland was born in Winnetka, Illinois.

== Career ==
Ragland has provided voices for numerous video games including Driver: San Francisco. He also starred in the documentary series, I Shouldn't Be Alive, as Travis Wright.

He joined the voice cast of Thomas & Friends in 2015, taking over the role of Percy in the US dub from the nineteenth season until the show's cancellation in 2020. He replaced Martin Sherman, who also voiced Thomas and left the voice cast due to contractual disagreements. Ragland also voices the Troublesome Trucks in both the UK and US taking over from Ben Small, and Trevor in the US. His wife, Rachael Miller, joined the cast of the series in 2018, and voiced new main cast regular Rebecca in addition to numerous extra supporting and minor characters.

Aside from Thomas & Friends, Ragland has also lent his voice to several other animated projects including the films Inside Out and Minions, the English dubs of Sherlock Yack, My Knight and Me and Scary Larry and an episode of The Amazing World of Gumball.

== Personal life ==
Ragland currently resides in London, England. He was married to voice actress Rachael Miller, who also voiced Rebecca and several characters in the twenty-second season of Thomas & Friends and the movie Thomas and Friends: Big World! Big Adventures!.

== Filmography ==
=== Film ===
Year	Title	Role	Notes
2015	Thomas & Friends: The Adventure Begins	Troublesome Trucks	Film, Supporting role
2015	Sodor's Legend of the Lost Treasure	Percy the Small Engine	Minor US role
2015	Minions	Additional voices	
2015	Inside Out	Roger	
2016	Thomas & Friends: The Great Race	Percy the Small Engine	US voice UK singing voice; uncredited
2017	Thomas & Friends: Journey Beyond Sodor	Percy the Small Engine (US) Jem Cole and the Troublesome Trucks	Voice
2018	Big World! Big Adventures!	Percy the Small Engine (US) A race car and a cowboy	Voice
2026	Masters of the Universe	Orko	

=== Television ===
Year	Title	Role	Notes
2010	Get Out Alive	Byron Sanders	1 episode
2010–2012	I Shouldn't Be Alive	Travis Wright	Recurring role
2011–2019	The Amazing World of Gumball	Additional voices	Recurring role
2011–2012	Sherlock Yack	Additional voices	English dub
2012	Scary Larry		English dub
2014	That's English	Anthony	1 episode
2015–2021	Thomas & Friends	Percy the Small Engine, Trevor, Troublesome Trucks	Voice; main/recurring role; Succeeding Martin Sherman as Percy
2016	Undercover	Court Clerk	Mini-series; 1 episode
2017	My Knight and Me	Wilfried, Lance, Black rats	Voice; 18 episodes
2022	The Unstoppable Yellow Yeti	Ned	Voice

=== Video games ===
Year	Title	Role	Notes
2008	WoldShift	Trooper	
2011	Driver: San Francisco	Additional voices	
2013	Killzone: Mercenary	Additional voices	
2015	Randal's Monday	Ted, Supernerd, Prisoner Having Lunch	
2015	Anno 2205	Aidan Barghava	
2016	Deponia Doomsday	Additional voices	
2016	Homefront: The Revolution	Additional voices	
2017	Horizon Zero Dawn	Lut, Musas, Nasan	
2017	Lego Marvel Super Heroes 2	Additional voices	
2017	Star Wars: Battlefront II	Additional voices	
2017	Xenoblade Chronicles 2	Aegaeon	
2018	Xenoblade Chronicles 2: Torna – The Golden Country	Aegaeon	
2019	Irony Curtain: From Matryoshka with Love	Evan Kovolsky	
2019	Trials Rising	Player Character (Male)	
2019	Terminator: Resistance	Jacob Rivers	
2024	Lego Horizon Adventures	Mysterious Trader	
2024	Wizardry Variants Daphne	Vernant	
2025	The Hundred Line: Last Defense Academy	Shouma Ginzaki, Addamaque	
