= Martin Sherman (actor) =

American actor

- Born: Martin T. Sherman; 1971 (age 54–55); St. Petersburg, Florida, U.S.
- Occupations: Actor; director; writer; inventor
- Years active: 1994–present

Martin T. Sherman (born 1971) is an American actor, director, writer and inventor. He is known for his various voice roles in the children's television series Thomas & Friends as well as his voice role as Pac-Man in the 2005 video game Pac-Man World 3 and the 2025 remake of Pac-Man World 2.

== Early life ==
Martin T. Sherman was born in St. Petersburg, Florida in 1971. He is a graduate of Gibbs High School.

== Career ==
Sherman has starred in several films and television as well as providing voice acting for several video games, including Pac-Man in Pac-Man World 3 (2005), the first time the character ever had a voice actor in his games. From 2009 to 2015, Sherman voiced Thomas the Tank Engine and Percy the Small Engine in the American dub of the children's television series Thomas & Friends, as well as providing their voices for the Day Out with Thomas dummy units and the steam locomotive at the Strasburg Rail Road. He also voiced Diesel in the show's US dub from 2013 to 2015, taking over from former U.S. narrator Michael Brandon. After Sherman's departure from the series, Joseph May, Christopher Ragland, and Kerry Shale had taken over the roles of Thomas, Percy, and Diesel respectively, though Shale had already voiced the latter character in the UK dub.

In addition to his acting work, Sherman is also an inventor, specializing in ocean engineering.

== Filmography ==
=== Film ===
Year	Title	Role	Notes
2002	Gangs of New York	Man	
2005	Green Street	Mitch	
2005	The Tiger and the Snow	Soldato Americano	
2006	Incubus	Orin Kiefer (voice)	Uncredited
2009	Thomas & Friends: Hero of the Rails	Thomas, Percy (voice)	American dub
2010	Thomas & Friends: Misty Island Rescue	Thomas, Percy (voice)	American dub
2010	Spirit of the Forest	Piorno, Huhu (voice)	English dub
2011	Captain America: The First Avenger	Brandt's Aide	
2011	Thomas & Friends: Day of the Diesels	Thomas, Percy (voice)	American dub
2012	Thomas & Friends: Blue Mountain Mystery	Thomas, Percy (voice)	American dub
2013	Thomas & Friends: King of the Railway	Thomas, Percy, Diesel (voice)	American dub
2014	Thomas & Friends: Tale of the Brave	Thomas, Percy (voice)	American dub

=== Television ===
Year	Title	Role	Notes
2009–2015	Thomas & Friends	Thomas, Percy, Diesel (voice)	American dub
2011–2016	SkaterBots	Rodney Hawkins (voice)	
2014–2019	Marcus Level	Gorbar (voice)	Main cast
2015	Doctor Who	Man	Episode: "Hell Bent"

=== Video games ===
Year	Title	Role	Notes
2003	Conflict: Desert Storm II - Back to Baghdad	US Briefing Officer	
2004	Driv3r	Additional voices	
2004	Second Sight	Additional voices	
2005	Juiced	Jack	
2005	Sniper Elite	Karl Fairburne	
2005	Kameo: Elements of Power	Additional voices	
2005	Pac-Man World 3	Pac-Man, Blinky (Clyde)	
2005	Perfect Dark Zero	Killian	
2007	The Witcher	Radovid V the Stern	
2008	So Blonde	Kid	
2008	Emergency Heroes	Zach Harper	
2008	Everybody's Golf 5	Felipe	English dub
2008	Haze	Corporal Bobby Watchstrap	
2008	Crysis Warhead	Marine	
2012	Deponia	Wenzel, Gonzo	
2013	Crysis 3	Teammate #6	
2014	Sacred 3	Z4ngri3f	
2014	Randal's Monday	Matt	
2014	LittleBigPlanet 3	Gustavo	
2015	Lego Dimensions	Additional voices	
2016	Deponia Doomsday	Wenzel, Gonzo	English dub
2017	Horizon Zero Dawn	Dekamin, Muns, Shahavad	
2017	Lego Marvel Super Heroes 2	Spider-Man, Iron Fist	
2017	Star Wars Battlefront II	Voice Talent	
2018	Lego The Incredibles		
2018	State of Mind	Civil Doctor	
2019	Terminator: Resistance	Alvin	
2021	It Takes Two	Hammerhead	
2022	Xenoblade Chronicles 3	Teach	English dub
2025	Pac-Man World 2 Re-Pac	Pac-Man, Clyde	

=== Other work ===
- Day Out with Thomas (2014–2015) - Thomas and Percy (voice, pre-recorded dialogue)

== Production work ==
- Juiced (2005) – Writer
- Crusty Demons (2006) – Voice director
- So Blonde (2008) – Director
