= William Hope (actor) =

Canadian actor

- Other name: Bill Hope
- Occupation: Actor
- Years active: 1980–present

William Hope is a Canadian actor, best known for his numerous roles in the Alien and Alien vs. Predator franchises, portraying Lieutenant Scott Gorman in Aliens (1986) and Alien: River of Pain (2017), the Xenomorphs (Aliens) and Yautja (Predators) in Aliens Versus Predator (1999) and Aliens Versus Predator 2 (2001), Doctor H. G. Groves in Aliens vs. Predator (2010), and Colonial Marshal Waits in Alien: Isolation (2014) and its 2019 animated miniseries adaptation.

== Early life, family and education ==
Hope was born in Canada. He studied acting at the Royal Academy of Dramatic Art in London.

== Personal Life ==
Hope lives in Surrey, England.

== Career ==
Early in his career, he turned down a major role in Kubrick's Full Metal Jacket for a role in James Cameron's Aliens (1986) as Lt. Gorman. Soon after he appeared as Kyle MacRae in the horror film Hellbound: Hellraiser II (1988), the sequel to Clive Barker's Hellraiser (1987).

Hope appeared in Shining Through (1992) and The Saint (1997), Sky Captain and the World of Tomorrow (2004) and XXX (2002). He co-starred in two Wesley Snipes' action epics The Marksman (2005) and The Detonator (2006) and as the villain in Steven Seagal's action movie Submerged (2005).

He played Harry Ramos in the award-winning TV docudrama 9/11: The Twin Towers (2007), and as the President of Lehman Brothers in The Last Days of Lehman Brothers (2009) starring James Cromwell, in theatrical releases he has been seen opposite Woody Harrelson in The Walker (2007), Robert Downey Jr. in Sherlock Holmes (2009), and The Whistleblower (2010) with Rachel Weisz and Legacy with Idris Elba. He had television work including playing Matt LeBlanc's agent in Episodes (2011). He was also in Luc Besson's The Lady (2012) about the life of Aung San Suu Kyi and in 2011 he guest-starred in the BBC's final series of Spooks (2002) and alongside Johnny Depp in Tim Burton's Dark Shadows (2012).

Hope has performed as a voice and stage actor as well. He voiced several character in both the UK and US versions of Thomas & Friends. From 2009 to 2021, he provided voices for Edward, Toby, Whiff, Rocky and Farmer McColl in the US dub and also Bert of the Thomas & Friends children's TV and DVD series. He has also acted in London’s West End.

He also returned to the horror genre, working in the Solar Film's experimental Dark Floors, released in Europe in 2008. He is regularly heard on BBC Radio, and has performed in many radio plays. He is part of the BBC Broken News cast. He appeared in a book tour with author Tim Parfitt, his brother-in-law.

He is working on a new film in London that looks at dating in later life.

== Filmography ==
=== Film ===
Year	Title	Role	Notes
1981	Scanners	Hazmat Worker	Uncredited
1983	The Lords of Discipline	Senior	
1986	Aliens	Lieutenant Scott Gorman	
1987	Going Home	Lieutenant Anson	
1988	Hellbound: Hellraiser II	Kyle MacRae	
1992	Shining Through	Kernohan	
1993	Dropping the Baby	Harry	
1997	The Saint	State Department Official	
2000	Obedience	Dr. Norton	
2001	Never Say Never Mind: The Swedish Bikini Team	Bill Mason	
2002	XXX	Agent Roger Donnan	
2003	Labyrinth	Robert Fisk	
2003	Cockroach Blue	Flush Head	
2004	Sky Captain and the World of Tomorrow	American Broadcaster	
2005	The Marksman	Jonathan Tensor	
2005	Submerged	Agent Fletcher	
2006	The Detonator	Michael Shepard	
2008	Dark Floors	Jon	
2007	Finding Rin Tin Tin	Major Snickens	
2007	Trade Routes	Richter	
2007	The Walker	Mungo Tenant	
2009	Sherlock Holmes	American Ambassador Standish	
2009	Thomas & Friends: Hero of the Rails	Edward, Toby, Rocky and the Duke of Boxford	Film; US voice
2010	The Whistleblower	John Blakely	
2010	Thomas & Friends: Misty Island Rescue	Edward, Toby, Whiff, Bash, Rocky and the Dock Manager	Film; US voice
2010	The Glass House	Charles Lutz	
2010	Legacy	Mark Star	
2011	Captain America: The First Avenger	SHIELD Lieutenant	Film
2011	The Lady	James Baker	
2011	Thomas & Friends: Day of the Diesels	Edward, Toby and Rocky	Film; US voice
2011	Spiders 3D	Col. Jenkins	
2011	Cold Fusion	Willis	
2012	Thomas & Friends: Blue Mountain Mystery	Edward, Toby and Rocky	Film; US voice
2012	Gladiators of Rome	Fabrickus	English voice
2012	Dark Shadows	Sheriff Bill of Collinsport	
2013	Thomas & Friends: King of the Railway	Edward and Toby	Supporting Role; US voice
2013	Walking with the Enemy	Carl Lutz	
2013	Burton & Taylor	John Cullum	
2014	Thomas & Friends: Tale of the Brave	Edward and the Dock Manager	Film; Supporting Role; US voice
2015	Thomas & Friends: Sodor's Legend of the Lost Treasure	Edward and Toby	Film; Supporting Role; US voice
2015	Thomas & Friends: The Adventure Begins	Edward	Film; Main Role; US voice
2016	Tokyo Trial	John Patrick Higgins	
2016	Slumber	Malcolm	In production
2016	Thomas & Friends: The Great Race	Edward and the Dock Manager	Film; Supporting Role; US voice
2017	Thomas & Friends: Journey Beyond Sodor	Edward and Toby	Supporting Role; US voice
2018	Thomas and Friends: Big World Big Adventures!	Edward and Toby	Supporting Role; US voice
2018	The Catcher Was a Spy	John Kieran	
2022	Texas Chainsaw Massacre	Sheriff Hathaway	

=== Television ===
Year	Title	Role	Notes
1980	Flickers	Frank	1 episode
1982	Nancy Astor	Harry Langhorne	3 episodes
1984	Lace	Francis	2 episodes
1985	Tender Is the Night	American in bar	1 episode
1985	Behind Enemy Lines	Lt. Michael Turner	Television film
1986	The Last Days of Patton	MP Philip	Television film
1987	Screen Two	Lt. Anson	Episode: "Going Home"
1989	The Shell Seekers	Young Richard	Television film
1992	Tropical Heat	Lyle	Episode: "Stranger in Paradise"
1993	Scales of Justice	Defense lawyer	Episode: "Who Killed Sir Harry Oakes?"
1993	The Hidden Room	Kevin	Episode: "My Sister's Keeper"
1993	Street Legal	Mike Hogan	Episode: "Black and White in Color"
1994	To Save the Children	Duane Barton	Television film
1995	As Time Goes By	Young Lionel	Episode: "Improvements"
1996	Drop the Dead Donkey	James Sillett	Episode: "The Godless Society"
1997	The Vanishing Man	Kyle Jacob	Television film
1997	Bodyguards	Robert Connor	Episode: "Know Thine Enemy"
1998	The Vanishing Man	Kim Richards	Episode: "Out on a Limb"
1999	Gimme Gimme Gimme	Terry Clinger	Episode: "I Do, I Do, I Do"
1999	The Ambassador	Fr. Gardiner	Episode: "Unholy Alliance"
2000	Animated Epics: Moby Dick	Peter Coffin, Flask	Voices; Television film
2000	Sword of Honour	General Clayton	Television film
2002	Fields of Gold	Nick Venner	Television film
2004	Dunkirk	Cdr J Clouston RN	Television film documentary
2005	Coming Up	Major Winchester	Episode: "Viva Liberty!"
2005	Egypt	Theodore Davis	TV Mini-series documentary Episode: "The Search for Tutankhamun"
2005	Broken News	Robert Strang	Episode: "Hijack"
2006	The Eagle Falls	Col. Kyle	Television film
2006	Surviving Disaster	Jim Kyle	Episode: "Iran Hostage Rescue"
2006	Avenger	Stephen Edmonds	Television film
2006	If...	Kim	Episode: "If... The Oil Runs Out"
2006	Ultimate Force	Bob Schulman	Episode: "The Dividing Line"
2006	9/11: The Twin Towers	Harry Ramos	
2007	Midsomer Murders	Alan Alexander	Episode: "The Animal Within"
2008	Inspector Lewis	Quentin Jackson	Episode: "And the Moonbeams Kiss the Sea"
2008	Bonekickers	Preston Lester	Episode: "Warriors"
2008	Holby City	Steve Randall	Episode: "Hope, Faith and Charity"
2009	Moonshot	Psychologist	Television film
2010–2021	Thomas & Friends	Edward, Toby, Whiff, Bert (Season 16 onwards; US/UK), Bash, Rocky, Stephen Hatt, Farmer McColl, The Duke of Boxford, The Dock Manager, The Maithwaite Stationmaster (Double Trouble and Wonky Whistle only) and The Knapford Stationmaster (Season 17 onwards)	Main/Recurring Roles; US;UK
2011	Spooks / MI-5	Jim Coaver	Season 10, six episodes
Episodes	Matt's Agent	1 episode	
2012	Upstairs Downstairs	Ambassador Kennedy	Episode: "The Love That Pays the Price"
2013	Agatha Christie's Marple / Marple	Lippincott	1 episode ("Endless Night")
2013–2014	Rãmâi cu mine	Tony	4 episodes
2014	The Searchers	Amos Edwards	TV Mini-series; 2 episodes
2015	Thunderbirds Are Go	Professor Callaway	Voice; 1 episode
2015	The Syndicate	Scott Mitchell	3 episodes
2016	The Syndicate	Scott Mitchell	4 episodes
2017	Red Moon		Unknown episode
2018–2019	Deep State	Senator Hawes	7 episodes
2019	Alien: Isolation	Marshal Waits	Voice and likeness

=== Self ===
- McLibel (1998) – Guardian Newspaper Representative
- Superior Firepower: The Making of 'Aliens (2003) (V) – Himself
- Mummies: Secrets of the Pharaohs (2007) – Charles Wilbour

=== Video games ===
Year	Title	Role	Notes
1999	Aliens Versus Predator	Xenomorphs (Aliens) and Yautja (Predators)	Voice
2001	C-12: Final Resistance	Cyborg 1	Voice
2001	Aliens vs. Predator 2	Predators	Voice
2004	Vietcong: Fist Alpha		Voice
2004	Headhunter: Redemption	MW3M	Voice
2005	Constantine	John Constantine	Voice
2005	Evil Dead: Regeneration	Additional voices	Voice
2005	X3: Reunion	Ion	Voice
2005	Kameo: Elements of Power	Halis	Voice (as Bill Hope)
2005	Ultimate Spider-Man	Ultimate Carnage Vocal-Effects	Voice, uncredited
2006	Hitman: Blood Money	Guard At Metal Detector	Voice, uncredited
2008	EN Pinball		Voice
2010	Aliens vs. Predator	Doctor H. G. Groves	Voice
2012	Driver: San Francisco		Voice
2014	Alien: Isolation	Marshal Waits	Voice and likeness
2018	11-11: Memories Retold	Mr. Taylor	
2020	Resident Evil 3	Mikhail Victor, Dr. Nathaniel Bard	Voice and motion capture

=== Audiobooks/plays ===
Year	Title	Role	Notes
2015	Aliens	Narrator (all roles)	Novelisation
2015	Alien Resurrection	Narrator (all roles)	Novelisation
2017	Alien: River of Pain	Lieutenant Scott Gorman	Audible audio play; uncredited
