= Michael Brandon =

American actor (born 1945)

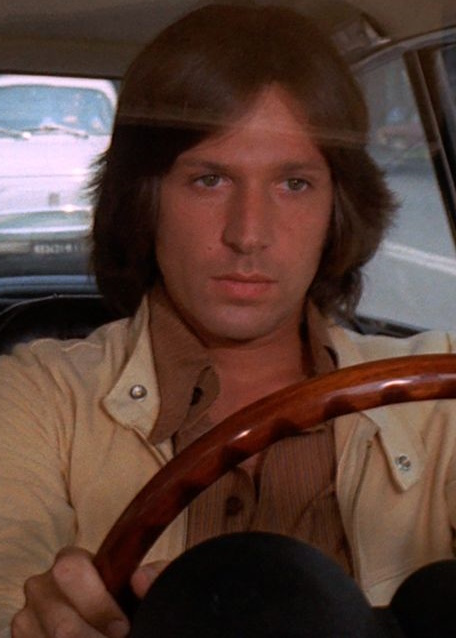
- Brandon in Four Flies on Grey Velvet, 1971
- Born: Michael Feldman; April 20, 1945 (age 81); New York City, New York, U.S.
- Education: American Academy of Dramatic Arts
- Occupation: Actor
- Years active: 1967–present
- Spouses: Lindsay Wagner (m. 1976; div. 1979); Glynis Barber (m. 1989)
- Children: 1
- Website: michaelbrandon.net

Michael Brandon (born Michael Feldman; April 20, 1945) is an American actor. He is known for his role as James Dempsey on the British drama series Dempsey and Makepeace (1985–86) and narrating the American dub of the children's television series Thomas & Friends (2004–12). His theatre credits include the original Broadway production of Does a Tiger Wear a Necktie? (1969), and Jerry Springer in the West End production of Jerry Springer: The Opera (2003–2004).

Brandon has starred in films including Lovers and Other Strangers (1970), Jennifer on My Mind (1971), Four Flies on Grey Velvet (1971), FM (1978), Promises in the Dark (1979), A Change of Seasons (1980), Rich and Famous (1981) and Captain America: The First Avenger (2011). He also acted in the TV movies The Third Girl from the Left (1973), Queen of the Stardust Ballroom (1975), James Dean (1976), Deadly Messages (1985), The Lost Battalion (2001) and Hawking (2004).

== Early life ==
Brandon was born Michael Feldman in Brooklyn, New York on April 20, 1945, to Jewish parents Miriam (née Tumen) and Sol Feldman. At age nine, he and his family moved to Valley Stream, New York, where he attended Memorial Junior High and graduated from Valley Stream Central High School. Brandon then attended the American Academy of Dramatic Arts and made his debut on Broadway before turning to cinema. He is of Jewish heritage.

== Career ==
Brandon starred in the TV series Dempsey and Makepeace and Dinotopia, the movies Lovers and Other Strangers (1970), Four Flies on Grey Velvet (1971), F.M. (1978), A Vacation In Hell (1979) and A Change of Seasons (1980), and the plays Does a Tiger Wear a Necktie? and Jerry Springer - The Opera.

Since moving to the UK, Brandon has worked in television shows such as The Bill, Trial & Retribution, and Dead Man Weds. He also played the title role in the musical Jerry Springer: The Opera for over a year in the National Theatre and after its transfer into the West End. Brandon starred in Singin' in the Rain in the summer of 2012.

In 2004, he became the fourth American narrator and Alec Baldwin's replacement from the seventh through the sixteenth seasons of the children's television series Thomas & Friends and has also narrated four of the CGI film specials, including Hero of the Rails, Misty Island Rescue, Day of the Diesels, and Blue Mountain Mystery, until departing from the role in 2012. In February 2008, he began his talk radio show on City Talk (now Greatest Hits Radio Liverpool & The North West), a new local radio station in Liverpool. In 2008, he appeared in the Series 4 finale of the BBC's Doctor Who, as General Sanchez, a UNIT officer. Also in 2008, he appeared in the television series Bones, as Roger Frampton, an American millionaire.

In 2011, Brandon guest-starred in an episode of the BBC1 con drama Hustle as Marcus Wendell (series 7, episode 3). Also in 2011, he was seen in a supporting role in the film Captain America: The First Avenger as a politician who befriends the titular character. In September 2013 he appeared in the ITV dancing show Stepping Out with wife Glynis Barber. In 2017, he premiered his autobiographical stand-up comedy, Off Ramps at the Edinburgh Fringe Festival. In 2022, he appeared in an episode of Casualty on BBC1.

== Personal life ==
Brandon lived with actress Kim Novak for 18 months in 1973–74. Brandon was married to actress Lindsay Wagner from 1976 to 1979. He has been married to actress Glynis Barber, with whom he co-starred in Dempsey & Makepeace, since 18 November 1989. The couple have a son, and live in London.

== Filmography ==
=== Film ===
Year	Title	Role	Notes	Ref.
1969	Goodbye, Columbus	Dartmouth		
1970	Lovers and Other Strangers	Mike		
1970	Jennifer on My Mind	Marcus Rottner		
1971	Four Flies on Grey Velvet	Robert Tobias		
1972	Strangers in 7A	Billy		
1973	Heavy Traffic	Street Cat (voice)		
1973	The Third Girl From the Left	David		
1974	Hitchhike!	Keith Miles		
1974	The Red Badge of Courage	Jim Conklin		
1975	Queen of the Stardust Ballroom	David Asher		
1975	Cage Without a Key	Ben Holian		
1976	James Dean	Bill Blast		
1978	FM	Jeff Dugan		
1979	A Vacation in Hell	Alan		
1979	Promises in the Dark	Dr. Jim Sanderson		
1980	A Change of Seasons	Pete Lachapelle		
1981	Rich and Famous	Max		
1983	Venice Medical	Dr. Pete Marcus		
1985	Deadly Messages	Michael Krasnick		
1989	Divided We Stand	Bryan Gibbs		
1990	Have a Nice Night	Tom Lepski		
1990	Want to Stay Alive?	Tom Lepski		
1990	Présumé dangereux	Tom Lepski		
1990	Try This One for Size	Tom Lepski		
1990	The Care of Time	Robert Halliday		
1996	The Disappearance of Kevin Johnson	Jeff Littman		
1997	The Apocalypse Watch	Ambassador Courtland		
1997	Deja Vu	Alex		
2001	Contaminated Man	Wyles		
2001	Scooby-Doo and the Cyber Chase	Skeleton Gladiator (voice)		
2001	The Lost Battalion	General Robert Alexander		
2004	Hawking	Arno Penzias		
2005	Calling All Engines!	US Narrator		
2006	The Detonator	Commander Flint		
2006	Are You Ready For Love?	Randy Bush		
2008	Me and Orson Welles	Les Tremayne		
2009	Toscanini in His Own Words	Wilfrid Pelletier		
2009	Hero of the Rails	US Narrator (voice)		
2009	The Last Days of Lehman Brothers	Jamie Dimon		
2010	Misty Island Rescue	US Narrator, Diesel (voices)		
2011	Captain America: The First Avenger	Senator Brandt		
2011	Day of the Diesels	US Narrator, Diesel (voices)		
2012	Blue Mountain Mystery	US Narrator, Diesel (voices)		
2014	Born of War	Harm Helder		
2017	The Time of Their Lives	Harry Scheider		
2019	Passport to Oblivion	Parkington (voice)		
2022	Renegades	Palmer		
2024	Canary Black	President of the United States		

=== Television ===
Year	Title	Role	Notes	Ref.
1969	Medical Center	Andy Tobin	Episode: "Thousands and Thousands of Miles"	
1969	Mr. Deeds Goes to Town	Unknown role	1 episode	
1972	Owen Marshall, Counsellor at Law	Pete Giannetta	Episode: "Journey Through Limbo"	
1972	Love American Style	Leonard	1 episode	
1973	Love Story	Gary Stone	Episode: "Love Came Laughing"	
1974	Medical Center	Dr. Lensko	Episode: "Web of Intrigue"	
1975	Police Surgeon	Brian Lewis	Episode: "Insight to Murder"	
1975	Police Story	Mike Ripley	Episode: "A Community of Victims"	
1983	St. Elsewhere	Tony Gifford	Episode: "AIDS & Comfort"	
1983–84	Emerald Point N.A.S.	David Marquette	11 episodes	
1985–86	Dempsey and Makepeace	Lt. James Dempsey	30 episodes	
1987	Screen Two	Eddie	Episode: "Visitors"	
1988	Tales of the Unexpected	Stephen Baker	Episode: "The Finger of Suspicion"	
1988	The Magical World of Disney	Jeff Robins	Episode "Rock and Roll Mom"	
1991	Dynasty: The Reunion	Arlen Marshall	2 episodes	
1992	Home Fires	Ted Kramer	6 episodes	
1994	Shattering the Silence	Ted Ricci	Episode: "Not in My Family"	
1994	Murder, She Wrote	Alex Weaver	Episode: "Proof in the Pudding"	
1997	The Knock	Greg Taylor	Mini-series	
1998	Dark Realm	Bristol	Episode: "Murder One"	
1998	J.A.G.	D.A. Nardoni, Col.Hegstetter	2 episodes	
1998	The Nanny	Stan	Episode: "The Nanny & the Hunk Producer"	
1998	Ally McBeal	D.A. Dawson	Episode: "The Inmates"	
1999	CI5: The New Professionals	Dr. Woods	Episode: "Skorpion"	
1999	Jonathan Creek	Capt. Frank Candy	Episode: "The Omega Man"	
1999	The Practice	D.A. Dawson	2 episodes	
2001	The Division	Judge Stone	Episode: "Deal with the Devil"	
2002	Dinotopia	Frank Scott	8 episodes	
2003	Ed Stone Is Dead	Dad	1 episode	
2004–12	Thomas & Friends	Narrator [Series 6–16], Diesel [Series 13–16], Mr. Bubbles [Series 13–15] (voices)	US dub; 239 episodes	
2004	The Catherine Tate Show	Various	Episode: "Car Party"	
2005	Dead Man Weds	Chuck Newman	6 episodes	
2006	Miss Marple	Martin Zimmerman	Episode: "The Sittaford Mystery"	
2006	The Catherine Tate Show	Robert	Episode: "Large Breasted Doctor"	
2006	Trial & Retribution	Max Stanford	Episode: "XI: Closure"	
2006–08	Jack and the Sodor Construction Company	US Narrator (voice)	13 episodes	
2007	Casualty	Mike Barnicott	Episode: "Inheritance"	
2007	The Bill	Louis Dreyfuss	4 episodes	
2008	Bewitched	Rex	1 episode	
2008	Doctor Who	General Sanchez	Episode: "The Stolen Earth"	
2009	After You've Gone	Bill Tucker	Episode: "There Will Be Pud"	
2009	Bones	Roger Frampton	Episode: "The Yanks in the U.K.: Parts 1 and 2"	
2009	New Tricks	Colonel Norton	Episode: "The Truth Is Out There"	
2010	Rosamund Pilcher's Shades of Love	Conrad	2 episodes	
2010	Hustle	Marcus Wendell	Episode: "Clearance from a Deal"	
2012	Mr. Selfridge	FW Woolworth	Episode: #1.8	
2012–17	Episodes	Elliot Salad	8 episodes	
2013	Death in Paradise	Joel Maurice	Episode: "A Deadly Curse"	
2014	Blandings	Grumman	Episode: "Lord Emsworth Acts for the Best"	
2015	Galavant	Sid's Dad	Episode: "Two Balls"	
2016–18	Tracey Ullman's Show	Hal	4 episodes	
2017	I Live with Models	Don	Episode: "Tommy's Dad"	
2017	Tracey Breaks the News	Rich	1 episode	
2017	Loaded	Leslie 'The Emperor'	3 episodes	
2018	Trust	Walter Annenberg	Episode: "White Car in a Snowstorm"	
2019	Urban Myths	Robert Calgary	Episode: "The Trial of Joan Collins"	
2022	Casualty	Bill Phillipsen	Episode: "On the Edge"	
2023	The Power	Robertson Laing	Episode: "A Better Future Is in Your Hands"	

==== TV films and miniseries ====
Year	Title	Role	Ref.
1971	The Impatient Heart	Frank Pescadero	
1976	Scott Free	Tony Scott	
1977	Red Alert	Carl Wyche	
1978	The Comedy Company	Paul Lester	
1980	A Perfect Match	Steve Triandos	
1982	Between Two Brothers	Lead	
1984	The Seduction of Gina	Keith Sindell	
1996	Gone in a Night	David Protess	
1997	The Knock	Greg Taylor	

=== Video games ===
Year	Title	Role	Notes	Ref.
2017	Star Wars: Battlefront II	Additional voices		
2021	King's Bounty II	The Seer		

== Theatre credits ==
Year	Title	Role	Venue(s)	Ref.
1967	Under the Yum Yum Tree	Lead	Barn Dinner Theater	
1968	The Rainmaker	Jim Curry	Barn Dinner Theater	
1969	Does a Tiger Wear a Necktie?	Prince	Belasco Theater, Broadway	
1979	Lady and the Clarinet	Jack	Long Wharf Theatre	
1992	The Writing Game	Leo Rafkin	Manhattan Theater	
1999	Speed the Plow	Cox	The Royal Lincoln	
2000	The Adjustment	Matt	Guildford's YvonneArnaud Theatre, National tour	
2003–04	Jerry Springer: The Opera	Jerry Springer	National Theatre / Cambridge, West End	
2007	On the Waterfront	Charlie	Hackney Empire Theatre	
2010	Wet Weather Cover	Brad	Kings Head / Arts Theatre, West End	
2011–12	Singing in the Rain	R.F. Simpson	Palace Theatre, London	
2014	The Long Road South	Jake Price	Hope Theatre, London	
2016	Off The Kings Road	—N/a	Jermyn Street Theatre, London	
2016	Carry On Chilcot	—N/a	Duke of Wales, London	
2017	All My Sons	—N/a	Lyric Theatre, Hong Kong	
2017	Off Ramps - A Stand-Up Story	—N/a	Assembly Rooms, Edinburgh Fringe	
2018	Local Hero	Mark Knopfler	Workshop, Mark Knopfler	
2019	Other People's Money	—N/a	Southwark, Part of Jorgy Jorgensen	
2019	Roman Holiday	—N/a	Shanghai Theatre Festival	
2019	White Christmas	—N/a	Dominion Theatre, West End	
2021	Straight White Men	—N/a		
