= Matt Wilkinson (actor) =

British actor

- Occupations: Actor; playwright; director
- Years active: 1995–present
- Website: matt-wilkinson.co.uk

Matt Wilkinson is a British voice actor, playwright and director.

== Career ==
=== Acting ===
Wilkinson trained at the Royal Academy of Dramatic Art. Early in his career, he performed on stage and screen. He took roles in 1998's The Avengers and The Tichborne Claimant directed by David Yates and The Jolly Boys' Last Stand. He appeared in the Channel 4 series Shackleton and the Working Title films Ali G Indahouse and About a Boy. In 2005 he played Fingerman in V for Vendetta.

He played Trigorin in The Seagull with Geraldine James at the Arcola Theatre in 2011.

=== Voice work ===
Wilkinson has voiced multiple TV and radio commercials including the iconic series If Carlsberg did. In 2006 he voiced Scott in the BBC's Blizzard: Race to the Pole and narrated series 2 Cops With Cameras.

His first role in animation was Weasel in Watership Down. Further work followed with The Adventures of Bottle Top Bill and His Best Friend Corky, UK & US seasons of Empire Square (produced and directed by Blur's Dave Rowntree), seasons 3 & 4 of 64 Zoo Lane and the title role in Bunny Maloney.

Wilkinson voiced over 20 characters in the UK & US dubs of Thomas & Friends including Rocky, Spencer, Victor, Kevin and Diesel 10. He was featured in Trust Me, I'm a Genie, Justin and the Knights of Valour, The Unbeatables, Doctor Who: Tales from New Earth and 101 Dalmatian Street. He voiced Fastanfurius in Netflix's 2025 Asterix & Obelix: The Big Fight and multiple characters in Pocoyo seasons 5 & 6 narrated by Stephen Fry.

For gamers he is known as the voice of Murmur in Hellgate: London and Felix Jaeger in Warhammer II.

=== Writing and directing ===
In 2002, Wilkinson wrote and directed his first play Sun is Shining about an explosive love affair between a British Chinese trader and a Glaswegian artist. A sell-out at the Kings Head Theatre, London and BAC Time Out Critics' Choice season (2003), it transferred to the Brits Off Broadway Festival at 59E59 Theaters in New York in 2004.

In 2003, Wilkinson co-adapted and performed in Red Demon by Hideki Noda. It played at the Young Vic and Theatre Cocoon, Tokyo. His play Red Sea Fish (Brighton Dome Studio | 59E59 Theaters, New York) was staged in 2009.

Since 2015, Wilkinson has collaborated with producer Pádraig Cusack. That year, he wrote and directed My Eyes Went Dark at the Finborough Theatre. Starring Cal MacAninch and Thusitha Jayasundera it was nominated for three Offies, including Best Play. The production transferred to the Traverse Theatre, Edinburgh 2016 and 59E59 Theaters New York 2017.

In 2021, he wrote and directed Psychodrama as a pop-up in North London. It was nominated for the 2021 Offies for: "Lead Performance in a Play" (Emily Bruni and "Sound Design" (Gareth Fry). The show transferred to the Traverse Theatre for the Edinburgh Fringe 2022 where it was nominated for Off Fest Award for Best Theatre.

In 2024, Wilkinson directed the UK premiere of the Tony-nominated The Sound Inside by Adam Rapp at Traverse Theatre as part of the Edinburgh Fringe. The play premiered to Irish audiences at the Pavilion Theatre, Dublin as part of the Dublin Theatre Festival 2025, becoming the most successful festival show in the venue's history.
