= List of songs recorded by Skye Sweetnam =

This is a list of songs recorded, sung or written by Skye Sweetnam.

== Released songs ==
This is a chronological list of officially released songs by Canadian singer-songwriter Skye Sweetnam.

=== 2002–2004 ===
- "Billy S."
- "Fallen Through"
- "Heart of Glass"
- "Hypocrite"
- "I Don't Care"
- "I Don't Really Like You"
- "Imaginary Superstar"
- "It Sucks"
- "Number One"
- "Sharada"
- "Shattered"
- "Shot to Pieces"
- "Smoke & Mirrors"
- "Split Personality"
- "Sugar Guitar"
- "Superstar"
- "Tangled Up in Me"
- "Tidal Wave"
- "Too Late"
- "Unpredictable"
- "Wild World"

=== 2007–2008 ===
- "Babydoll Gone Wrong"
- "Boyhunter"
- "Cartoon"
- "Ghosts"
- "Girl Like Me"
- "Human"
- "Kiss a Girl"
- "(Let's Get Movin') Into Action"
- "Make-Out Song"
- "Music Is My Boyfriend"
- "My Favorite Tune"
- "Scary Love"
- "Ultra"
- "Where I Want to Be"

== Unreleased songs ==
This is a chronological list of confirmed unreleased songs by singer-songwriter Skye Sweetnam.

- "Awakening" (James Robertson, Skye Sweetnam)
- "Blow Your Mind" (James Robertson, Skye Sweetnam)
- "Creep!" (Skye Sweetnam, Stefy Rae, Jimmy Harry)
- "Follow the Leader" (James Robertson, Skye Sweetnam)
- "Get Over You" (Alexander Cantrall, Karlin Kenneth, Lindy Robbins, Carsten Schack, Skye Sweetnam)
- "Give Me Direction" (James Robertson, Skye Sweetnam)
- "Hitch Hiking" (James Robertson, Skye Sweetnam)
- "Holes" (James Robertson, Skye Sweetnam)
- "I Ain't Givin' It Up" (Alexander Cantrall, Karlin Kenneth, Lindy Robbins, Carsten Schack, Skye Sweetnam)
- "Ice Song" (Skye Sweetnam, James Robertson)
- "I'm Coming for You" (James Robertson, Skye Sweetnam)
- "Kingdoms Crumble Down" (James Robertson, Skye Sweetnam)
- "My Brand New Life"
- "Party Song" (Ashley Coulter, Michael Fox, Skye Sweetnam)
- "Peg Legged Pretty a.k.a. Captain Sly" (Skye Sweetnam, Matt Drake)
- "Please" (Skye Sweetnam, James Robertson)
- "Poison the Princess" (James Robertson, Skye Sweetnam)
- "Rebel Wannabe" (Skye Sweetnam, Matt Drake)
- "Reckless" (Ashley Coulter, Michael Fox, Skye Sweetnam)
- "Remember Me" (Skye Sweetnam, Lester Mendez)
- "She's Got That Thing" (James Robertson, Skye Sweetnam)
- "Sold" (James Robertson, Skye Sweetnam)
- "Sound Soldier" (James Robertson, Skye Sweetnam)
- "That Girl in the Mirror" (James Robertson, Skye Sweetnam)
- "The Great Melody Escape" (James Robertson, Skye Sweetnam)
- "The Lion's Den" (James Robertson, Skye Sweetnam)
- "Utopia"
- "Audio Album" (James Robertson, Skye Sweetnam)

== Miscellaneous songs ==
=== Self-released ===
- "Boomerang" (YouTube video and MySpace)
- "Bring It Back" (MySpace)
- "Something Like a Heartbreak" (YouTube video) (James Robertson, Skye Sweetnam)
- "Love Sugar Sweet" (YouTube video)
- "Musick" (MySpace)
- "Stay" (MySpace)
- "Wolves & Witches" (James Robertson, Skye Sweetnam)
- "March Of The Sound Soldier"

=== Soundtrack songs ===
- "Part of Your World" - DisneyMania 3
- "Part of Your World (C-Girl Rock Remix)" - DisneyRemixMania
- "Cruella DeVil" – DisneyMania 4
- "Why Doesn't Santa Like Me?" – Radio Disney Jingle Jams

=== Theme songs ===
- "Fly by the Wayside" – Wayside
- "Just The Way I Am" – The Buzz on Maggie
- "Radio Free Roscoe Theme" – Radio Free Roscoe
- "My Life Me Theme" – My Life Me

=== Other ===
- "Girl Most Likely To" – The Barbie Diaries
- "Note to Self" – The Barbie Diaries
- "Lava Rock" – Super Monkey Ball: Step & Roll
- "Real Life" – The Barbie Diaries
- "This Is Me" – The Barbie Diaries

=== Sumo Cyco ===
- "LIMP"
- "Mercy"
- "Get Off"
- "Interceptor"
- "Danger"
- "Who Do You Want To Be" - Oingo Boingo Cover
- "Little Drummer boy"
- "Loose Cannon"
- "Where Do We Go"
- "Renegade"
- "Permanent Holiday (Locked in the Trunk of His Car)"
- "The Ugly"
- "Go Go Go"
- "Cry Murder"
- "Fighter"
- "Fuel My Fire"
- "Like A Killer"
- "Brave"
- "We Ride"
- "Crowd Control (Do What We Want)"
- "My Name is Rock n' Roll"
- "System Victim"
- "Sirens"
