= Joseph May =

British actor

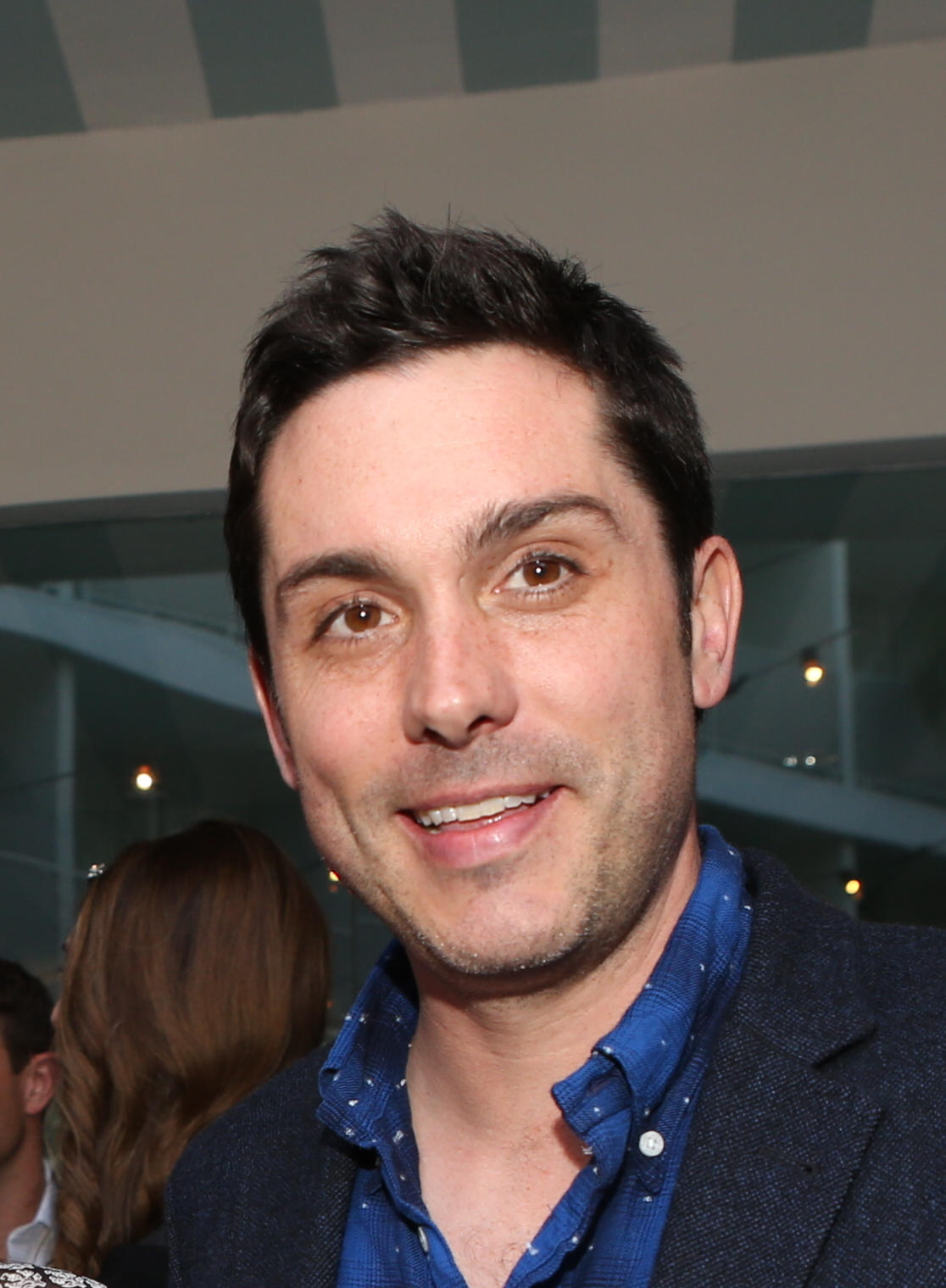
- May in 2014
- Born: England
- Education: London Academy of Music and Dramatic Art
- Occupation: Actor
- Years active: 1997–present
- Agent: Characters Talent Agency

Joseph May is a British actor. He is best known for his role as Adam Moseby in Bugs, Andy Button in the television series Episodes, Paul who was the boyfriend of Sam Colloby, in Casualty, Luke in I Live with Models and for voicing Thomas in the US dub of the children's television series Thomas & Friends from 2015 to 2021.

His other television roles include Dan Sanders in Hollyoaks, Sgt. Markham in Stargate: Atlantis and Justin Trudeau in The Windsors.

His voice work in animation and video games include Link in G.I. Joe: Valor vs. Venom, Mr. Wexler in The Barbie Diaries, Autolycus in Class of the Titans, Michael Corleone in The Godfather, Perdido in Xenoblade Chronicles 2, Chase McCain in Lego City Undercover, Jost and Saravad in Horizon Zero Dawn, Hiro in The Crew 2 and Ellis in Blair Witch and Varka in Genshin Impact.

== Early life ==
Born in England and raised in Calgary, Alberta, Canada, May returned to the United Kingdom to study at the London Academy of Music and Dramatic Art.

== Career ==
May may be most recognised by British-American television viewers as Paul, the unemployed partner of gay nurse Sam Colloby in Casualty's 12th season. He also starred in the final season of the sci-fi series Bugs as the naive and misguided Adam Mosby. May has also appeared in the television series Stargate: Atlantis as Sgt. Markham of the United States Marine Corps, Episodes as Andy Button, a television casting director, and as Larry Schwarz in the BBC television movie We'll Take Manhattan.

May's initiation into film was as a miner in the Brian Gilbert 1997 Oscar Wilde biopic, Wilde. Since then, he has appeared in the critically acclaimed World War II miniseries Band of Brothers as second lieutenant Edward Shames, 2001's Investigating Sex as Roger, Resident Evil as Dr. Blue and Holby City as surgeon George Kerwan in 2010.

May voiced the character of main protagonist Chase McCain for the 2013 video game Lego City Undercover and its prequel, Lego City Undercover: The Chase Begins.

In 2015, he joined the US voice cast of Thomas & Friends as Thomas the Tank Engine (following Martin Sherman's departure from the title role after the eighteenth series), starting with the special The Adventure Begins. In 2021, the show ended its run after 24 seasons and a reboot titled All Engines: Go! started airing. May voiced the character of the mercenary Phantom in the team-based first-person shooter Dirty Bomb.

In 2019, he went to play Brett Huntley in the television miniseries Dark Mon£y, which featured Babou Ceesay and John Schwab.

== Filmography ==
=== Film ===
Year	Title	Role	Notes
1997	Wilde	First Miner	
1997	FairyTale: A True Story	Houdini's Assistant	
2001	Investigating Sex	Roger	Also known as Internal Affairs
2002	Resident Evil	Mr. Blue	Film
2004	G.I. Joe: Valor vs. Venom	Link	Voice, direct-to-video film
2006	The Barbie Diaries	Mr. Wexler	Voice
2006	Circumference	Steve	Short film
2007	White Noise: The Light	EMT	
2007	They Wait	Paramedic	
2009	Last Flowers	Harvey	Short film
2012	Resident Evil: Retribution	Dr. Blue	Archival footage
2015	Thomas & Friends: The Adventure Begins	Thomas the Tank Engine	Voice, US version
2015	Sodor's Legend of the Lost Treasure	Thomas the Tank Engine	Voice, US version
2015	Viking	Gallery Assistant	Short film
2016	Resident Evil: The Final Chapter	Dr. Blue	Archival footage
2016	Thomas & Friends: The Great Race	Thomas the Tank Engine	Voice, US version
2016	Bb	Officer Henry Harris	
2017	Poles Apart	Grizzly Bear (Aklak)	Voice, short film
2017	Journey Beyond Sodor	Thomas the Tank Engine	Voice, US version
2018	Thomas & Friends: Big World! Big Adventures! The Movie	Thomas the Tank Engine	Voice, US version
2019	Thomas & Friends: Digs and Discoveries (Part 1 & 2)	Thomas the Tank Engine	Voice, US version
2019	Thomas & Friends: Steam Team to the Rescue	Thomas the Tank Engine	Voice, US version
2020	Thomas and the Royal Engine	Thomas the Tank Engine	Voice, US version

=== Television ===
Year	Title	Role	Notes
1997	Bodyguards	Courier	Episode: "Know Thine Enemy"
1997	Casualty	Paul	8 episodes
1998–99	Bugs	Adam Moseby	6 episodes
1999–2000	Hollyoaks	Dan Sanders	Regular role
1999–2000	A Dinner of Herbs	Ben Hamilton	3 episodes
2001	Band of Brothers	Lieutenant Edward Shames	Episode: "The Breaking Point"
2001–2007	Scooter: Get a Clue!	Ben	Voice, main role 156 episodes
2002	American Bikers	Young Michael Baldwin	Voice, episode: "The Age of Bikers"
2003	Da Vinci's Inquest	Police Constable #2	Episode: "Send in the Clowns"
2004	Stargate: Atlantis	SGT# Markham	Episodes: "Thirty Eight Minutes" and "The Defiant One"
2004	Dead Like Me	Ken	Episode: "The Shadow End"
2005	Godiva's	Cop #1	Episode: "The Hungry Ghost"
2005	Class of the Titans	Autolycus	Voice
2005	Killer Instinct	Max Keller	Episode: "Game Over"
2006	The Dead Zone	Young Nolan	Episode: "Revelations"
2007	Blood Ties	Jude Marstens	Episode: "Drawn and Quartered"
2007	Psych	Bruce/Father	Episode: "Gus's Dad May Have Killed an Old Guy"
2009	Batman Black and White	Superman	Voice, 2 episodes
2010	I Shouldn't Be Alive	Dr. Andy Wolf	Episode: "Nightmare on the Mountain"
2010–14	Holby City	George Kerwan / Kristopher Wyngarten	5 episodes
2011–17	Episodes	Andy Button	22 episodes
2012	Titanic	Victor Giglio	3 episodes Television miniseries
2013	Dracula	Ewan Telford	1 episode
2014	Mistresses	Mickey	Episodes: "Rebuild" and "Open House"
2015–17	I Live with Models	Luke	Main Role
2015–21	Thomas & Friends	Thomas the Tank Engine	Voice, US version; succeeding Martin Sherman
2017	The Windsors	Justin Trudeau	Episode: "#2.5"
2018	Sky Comedy Shorts	Producer	Episode: "Kris Marshall's Whodunnit"
2019	Living the Dream	TJ Starmer	3 episodes
2019	Dark Mon£y	Brett Huntley	Television miniseries Episodes: "Shattered Dreams" and "The Valiant One"
2026	Dragon Striker	TBA	

=== Video games ===
Year	Title	Voice role	Notes
2005	SSX on Tour	Mackenzie "Mac" Fraser	Credited as Joe May
2006	The Godfather	Michael Corleone	
2006	Need for Speed: Carbon	Samson	Credited as Joe May
2009	Dead Space: Extraction	Nathan McNeill	
2011	Battlefield 3	Sanders	
2011	LittleBigPlanet 2	Green Lantern	
2012	LittleBigPlanet PS Vita	Green Lantern	
2013	Lego City Undercover	Chase McCain	
2013	Lego City Undercover: The Chase Begins	Chase McCain	
2013	Killzone: Shadow Fall	VSA Soldier	
2013	Trials Fusion	Rider	
2014	Escape Dead Island	Cliff Calo	
2015	Blues and Bullets	Osmond Burke, Carmine, Hank Sörensen, Additional voices	
2015	Dirty Bomb	Phantom	
2015	Lego Dimensions	Chase McCain	
2015	Soma	Peter Strasky and Brandon Wan	
2017	Tom Clancy's Ghost Recon: Wildlands	Nomad	Male
2017	Lego Dimensions	Chase McCain	
2017	Horizon Zero Dawn	Jost / Saravad	
2017	Forza Motorsport 7	The Racing Expert	
2017	Xenoblade Chronicles 2	Perdido	
2017	Need for Speed: Payback	Additional voices	
2018	A Way Out	Additional voices	
2018	The Crew 2	Hiro	
2019	The Division 2	Manny Ortega	
2019	Blair Witch	Ellis	
2020	Cyberpunk 2077	Jefferson Peralez	
2022	Dying Light 2: Stay Human	Barney	
2022	Aether Gazer	Tyr	
2023	Dead Island 2	Michael Anders, Sean	
2024	Wuthering Waves	Mortefi	
2025	The Hundred Line: Last Defense Academy	SIREI, Dahl'xia	
2025	Genshin Impact	Varka	
2025	Elden Ring: Nightreign	Ironeye	
