= Charmz =

Australian pop music group

- Origin: Sydney, New South Wales, Australia
- Genres: Pop
- Years active: 2006
- Labels: Shock
- Past members: Shannon Cordes; Gianna Dalla-Vecchia; Paris Maggs; Lauren Stowe

Charmz were an Australian four-piece girl band. They were put together by Mattel and Shock Records to promote a motion capture film, The Barbie Diaries (May 2006), which features Barbie in a band, Charmz. The group were developed through a singing contest for 8- to 14-year-old girls, who had to send in a video of themselves singing. The four winners, out of around 500 entrants, were 13-year-olds, Gianna Dalla-Vecchia, Paris Maggs and Lauren Stowe, and 14-year-old, Shannon Cordes.

Charmz members were taken to a recording studio in Sydney, where they were mentored by Ricki-Lee Coulter, a former Australian Idol contestant. Their self-titled album was released on 28 October 2006. It contains cover versions of tracks by Coulter, Robbie Williams, Bananarama, Gwen Stefani, the Mamas & Papas, and Hilary and Haylie Duff.

The album's single, "This Is Me", is a cover version of the original by Skye Sweetnam (the voice of Barbie in the film) and was written by Dorian Cheah, Amy Powers and Michele Vice. Charmz' rendition was issued ahead of the album on 31 July 2006, which peaked at No. 57 on the ARIA singles chart.

== Discography ==
=== Albums ===
List of albums, with selected details
Title	Details
Charmz	Released: October 2006; Format: CD; Label: Shock/Mattel

=== Singles ===
List of singles, with selected chart positions
Title	Year	Peak chart positions	Album
Title	Year	AUS	Album
"This Is Me"	2006	57	Charmz
