= Noise from the Basement =

Studio album by Skye Sweetnam
- Released: September 21, 2004
- Recorded: 2002–2004
- Genre: Pop-punk; pop rock; alternative rock; power pop
- Length: 39:24
- Label: Capitol
- Producer: Skye Sweetnam; James Robertson; Andrew Slater; Jeremy Wheatley; LCV

Skye Sweetnam chronology
Noise from the Basement (2004)	Sound Soldier (2007)

Singles from Noise from the Basement
- 1. "Billy S." Released: May 19, 2003; 2. "Tangled Up in Me" Released: June 21, 2004; 3. "Number One" Released: December 6, 2004

Noise from the Basement is the debut album by Canadian singer-songwriter Skye Sweetnam, released on September 21, 2004, by Capitol Records. It debuted and peaked at number 124 on the Billboard 200 and number 15 on the Oricon Album Charts. The album sold 71,000 copies in United States as of June 2007.

== Development and recording ==
Originally planned for a late 2003 release, the release of Sweetnam's debut album was postponed several times by the record label, being pushed back to April, then May and finally August of the following year before its official release in September of that year.

== Music and lyrics ==
Noise From The Basement was subject to many comparisons among critics with Avril Lavigne due to their similarities – same nationality and resembling attitude although Skye has described herself as being more "girly-girl" than her and mentioned that after hearing both albums, she could not find any real similarities between their sound.

== Promotion ==
Three songs from Noise from the Basement were released as singles. "Billy S." was released as the lead single, followed by "Tangled Up In Me" and "Number One". "Superstar" was released as a standalone track on iTunes.

Prior to the release of her debut album, Sweetnam toured in summer camps in the American Camplified Tour, from July to August 2003. In September, she performed in some venues in Ontario, New Brunswick, Nova Scotia and Newfoundland. She was also the opening act for Britney Spears' Onyx Hotel Tour and performed in the United States, Canada and Europe in the Spring of 2004. About that experience, she said:

"I love catching people off guard. That's why opening for Britney was so great. I was playing for people who had no idea who I was and had never heard my music. And by the end of the set, a lot of them found themselves really getting into it."

Skye was supposed to continue opening for Britney in the Summer, when the tour was going to return for a second round of concerts, but the Onyx Hotel Tour was eventually cancelled due to Spears injuring her knee. Following cancellation, Sweetnam regretted that it could no longer be used to promote Noise from the Basement, stating:

"It was kind of disappointing (when Britney hurt her knee) because we had this whole media hype behind the tour. It would have worked really well for a lead up for my album."

On August 5, 2004, she performed in the Fourth Annual Pantene Pro-Voice Concert, in New York City. Starting that month, she was a featured artist on AOL breakers for two months, and was also featured in a series of magazines, namely Rolling Stone, Blender, Teen People and Teen Vogue. Further promotion was backed up by a live performance of "Tangled Up In Me" in The Tonight Show with Jay Leno, one day before album's final release, and Sessions@AOL live performances a week earlier that same month.

In November 2004, Sweetnam went on tour with Ryan Cabrera and praised the positive reception from the audience in both Cabrera and Spears tours, mentioning she was fortunate to open for artists with different musical styles. Earlier that year, the track "Imaginary Superstar" was featured in Sleepover soundtrack and a shorter version of "Number One" was used in Women's National Basketball Association television commercials. This version had different lyrics from the album version, being recorded exclusively for the campaign.

== Track listing ==
No.	Title	Writer(s)	Producer(s)	Length
1.	"Number One"	Skye Sweetnam; Paul Cafaro; Peter Konicek; Eric Valentine	LCV; Sweetnam	2:43
2.	"Billy S."	Sweetnam; James Robertson	Robertson; Sweetnam	2:16
3.	"Tangled Up in Me"	Sweetnam; Robertson; Aslyn Nash; Jimmy Harry	Andrew Slater; Julian Raymond; Howard Willing	2:52
4.	"I Don't Really Like You"	Sweetnam; Robertson	Robertson; Sweetnam	2:56
5.	"I Don't Care"	Sweetnam; Robertson	Robertson; Sweetnam	3:36
6.	"Heart of Glass"	Debbie Harry; Chris Stein	Robertson; Sweetnam	3:01
7.	"Sharada"	Sweetnam; Robertson	Robertson; Sweetnam	2:37
8.	"It Sucks"	Sweetnam; Robertson	Robertson; Sweetnam	2:20
9.	"Fallen Through"	Sweetnam; Robertson	Robertson; Sweetnam	3:41
10.	"Hypocrite"	Sweetnam; Robertson	Robertson; Sweetnam	2:58
11.	"Unpredictable"	Sweetnam; Robertson	Robertson; Sweetnam	3:09
12.	"Shot to Pieces"	Sweetnam; Robertson	Robertson; Sweetnam	2:02
13.	"Smoke & Mirrors"	Sweetnam; Robertson	Robertson; Sweetnam	3:23
14.	"Split Personality" (Hidden track on North American editions)	Sweetnam; Robertson	Robertson; Sweetnam	2:03

Japanese bonus tracks
No.	Title	Writer(s)	Producer(s)	Length
14.	"Imaginary Superstar"	Sweetnam; Robertson	Robertson; Sweetnam	2:48
15.	"Tidal Wave" (special edition bonus track)	Sweetnam; Robertson	Robertson; Sweetnam	3:48
16.	"Sugar Guitar" (special edition bonus track)	Sweetnam; Robertson	Robertson; Sweetnam	3:16

Japanese bonus DVD
No.	Title	Length
1.	"About Me"
2.	"Skye in Japan"
3.	"Shattered" (music video) (song written by Sweetnam, Robertson)
4.	"Imaginary Superstar" (music video)
5.	"Billy S." (music video)
6.	"Tangled Up in Me" (music video)
7.	"Number One" (music video)
8.	"Tangled Up in Me" (making of)
9.	"Fallen Through" (Sessions@AOL) (audio track)
10.	"Heart of Glass" (Sessions@AOL) (audio track)
11.	"I Don't Care" (Sessions@AOL) (audio track)
12.	"Number One" (Sessions@AOL) (audio track)
13.	"Tangled Up in Me" (Acoustic) (Sessions@AOL) (audio track)
14.	"Tangled Up in Me" (Sessions@AOL) (audio track)
15.	"Unpredictable" (Sessions@AOL) (audio track)

Chinese/Korean Bonus AVCD
No.	Title	Length
1.	"Superstar" (music video)
2.	"Billy S." (music video)
3.	"Tangled Up in Me" (music video)
4.	"Number One" (music video)
5.	"Skye in Korea" (live performance)
6.	"Superstar" (karaoke)
7.	"Photo gallery"
8.	"Superstar" (audio track)
9.	"Imaginary Superstar" (audio track)
10.	"Sugar Guitar" (audio track)

Taiwanese/Thai bonus AVCD
No.	Title	Length
1.	"Billy S." (music video)
2.	"Tangled Up in Me" (music video)
3.	"Billy S." (live performance)
4.	"Tangled Up in Me" (making of)
5.	"Too Late" (audio track) (written by Sweetnam, Robertson)
6.	"Tidal Wave" (audio track)

== Personnel ==
- Skye Sweetnam – vocals
- James Robertson – various instruments
- Jeremy Wheatley – programming, background vocals
- Tim Van Der Kuil – guitar
- Damon Wilson – drums
- Andrew Martino – drums
- Vincent Sciara – keyboards

== Chart positions ==
Chart	Peak position
Japan Oricon Weekly International Albums Chart	15
US Billboard Top Heatseeker Albums	4
US Billboard 200	124

== Release history ==
Country	Date	Edition(s)	Label
Canada	September 21, 2004	Standard	EMI
United States	September 21, 2004	Standard	Capitol
Italy	October 27, 2004	Standard	Capitol
Japan	November 3, 2004	Standard	EMI
Japan	May 25, 2005	Special Edition CD+DVD	EMI
Portugal	November 29, 2004	Standard	EMI
South Korea	January 6, 2005	CD+DVD	EMI
South Korea	December 21, 2005	Special Edition CD+AVCD	EMI
Taiwan	January 14, 2005	CD+VCD	Gold Typhoon
France	February 14, 2005	Standard	Capitol
Thailand	May 31, 2005	CD+VCD	EMI
Germany	June 15, 2005	Standard	EMI
China	February 1, 2006	Special Edition CD+AVCD	EMI
