= Edward Shames =

U.S. army officer during World War II

Edward D. Shames
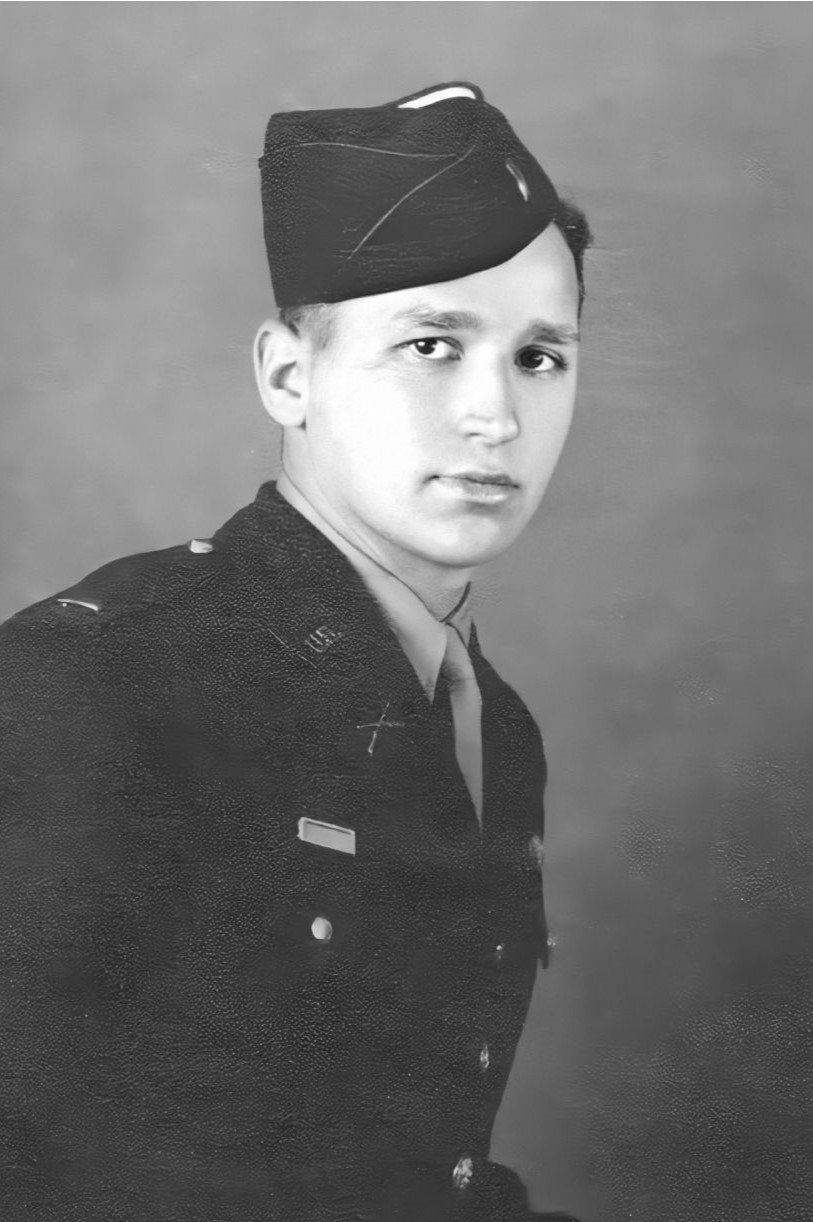
- Shames in 1945
- Born: June 13, 1922; Norfolk, Virginia, U.S.
- Died: December 3, 2021 (aged 99); Virginia Beach, Virginia, U.S.
- Relatives: David Shames (father); Sadie Shames (mother); Anna Shames (sister); Simmie Shames (sister); George Shames (brother)
- Military career
- Allegiance: United States
- Branch: United States Army
- Service years: 1942–1973
- Rank: Colonel
- Nickname: "Ed"
- Service number: 13117836 (enlisted)
- Units: 101st Airborne Division: I Company, 3rd Battalion, 506th Parachute Infantry Regiment; E Company, 2nd Battalion, 506th Parachute Infantry Regiment
- Conflicts: World War II: Operation Overlord; Operation Market Garden; Battle of the Bulge
- Other work: Specialist on Middle East affairs for the National Security Agency (1945–1982)

Colonel Edward David Shames (June 13, 1922 – December 3, 2021) was a United States Army enlisted man and officer who later served in the U.S. Army Reserve. During World War II, he was assigned to the 506th Parachute Infantry Regiment, 101st Airborne Division. Shames was Jewish and reported being deeply affected by his personal viewing of Nazi Germany's concentration camps.

Shames was the last surviving officer and, following the death of Roderick G. Strohl in December 2019, oldest surviving member of the regiment's Easy Company, 2nd Battalion. He was survived only by Private First Class Bradford C. Freeman.

== Early life ==
Shames was born in Norfolk, Virginia, in June 1922, to David and Sadie (Winer) Shames. Born in Latvia, David and Sadie were Russian Jewish immigrants who came to the United States in 1904, likely from Odessa.

Edward was the youngest of four brothers and sisters. Their father, who owned a grocery store, died in 1927 when Edward was five. Sadie's brother Ben Winer moved in to help raise the family.

By age 18, Shames was married to 16-year-old Lillian Hoffman. In 1940, he lived with his in-laws, Sam and Gussie Hoffman. The couple later divorced.

Shames married Ida Aframe in 1946.

== Military service ==
=== World War II ===
Shames enlisted in the U.S. Army on September 25, 1942. He read about and applied for duty with the 506th Parachute Infantry Regiment. He was sent to Toccoa, Georgia, for training, starting as a private in I Company, 3rd Battalion of the 506th.

In England, Shames was promoted to Operations Sergeant. He built the sand tables the airborne unit used in planning the airdrop into Normandy.

Shames made his first combat jump into Normandy on D-Day as part of Operation Overlord.

On 13 June 1944, he received a battlefield commission to second lieutenant; the formal commission was later completed in England. He was the first NCO in the Third Battalion to receive such a commission in Normandy. He was transferred to Easy Company and took charge of its third platoon.

Shames fought with Easy Company in Operation Market Garden and volunteered for Operation Pegasus led by Frederick Heyliger. He was wounded once in his left leg during the campaigns. He then fought with the rest of E Company in the Battle of the Bulge in Bastogne. In Foy, Shames and Paul Rogers knocked out a German tank with a bazooka. In Germany, he saw some of the concentration camps in which the Germans imprisoned and murdered Europe's Jews and, like many American soldiers, was deeply affected.

During the exploration of Eagle's Nest, Shames found a supply of cognac labeled "for the Fuhrer's use only". He later used it to toast his oldest son's Bar Mitzvah.

=== Post-war ===
After World War II, Shames worked for the National Security Agency as a specialist on Middle East affairs from 1945 to 1982. He also served in the United States Army Reserve and retired as a colonel in 1973.

He was married to Ida Aframe (b. April 9, 1922) from 1946 until she died on February 21, 2019.

Shames died on December 3, 2021, at the age of 99 at his residence in Virginia Beach and he was buried in the Forest Lawn Cemetery in Norfolk, Virginia. He was survived by two sons, four grandchildren, and 12 great-grandchildren.

At Shames' funeral, the 101st Airborne Division sent a funeral detail of a music section, firing party, and casket party. The detail was from the unit that traced its lineage to Shames's Easy Company. The detail was commanded by the unit's battalion commander. The casket party was led by the second lieutenant who held the same organizational position that Shames held in Easy.

== In popular culture ==
Shames was portrayed in the HBO miniseries Band of Brothers by Joseph May.

He also provided an audio interview for the documentary Greatest Events of World War 2: In Colour where he briefly described the Battle of the Bulge in the Ardennes, Belgium.

Edward Shames and his men from the Easy Company, the 2nd Battalion of the 506th Parachute Infantry Regiment of the 101st Airborne Division, were the first to go into Hitler’s Eagle’s Nest. Once inside, Shames took 2 bottles of Cognac bearing a label that said “For the Führer’s use only” in Kehlsteinhaus was reported to be a room of alcohol. Getting two bottles, giving one to Robert Sink and taking one home. saving this Cognac for a special day. And in 1961 at the Norfolk’s B’nai Israel synagogue Colonel Ed Shames opened it in celebration of his son’s bar mitzvah. Drinking it at his son's Bar Mitzvah, he tossed the bottle away after emptying it out, saying years later that the two cent glass bottle was all what was left.
