= Lost in Cyco City =

Studio album by Sumo Cyco
- Released: June 10, 2014 (Canada)
- Recorded: 2013–2014
- Genre: Alternative metal; punk rock; hard rock; alternative rock
- Length: 42:38
- Label: Independent
- Producer: Matt Drake

Sumo Cyco chronology
Lost in Cyco City (2014)	Opus Mar (2017)

Singles from Sumo Cyco
- 1. "The Ugly" Released: October 13, 2013; 2. "Go Go Go" Released: January 13, 2014; 3. "Cry Murder" Released: June 13, 2014; 4. "Brave" Released: October 6, 2014; 5. "Fighter" Released: April 9, 2015; 6. "Like A Killer" Released: November 12, 2015; 7. "Fuel My Fire" Released: April 1, 2016; 8. "Crowd Control" Released: April 1, 2016

Lost in Cyco City is the debut studio album by Canadian rock band Sumo Cyco. The album was released independently in Canada on June 10, 2014.

The band has released eight singles and music videos to promote the record.

Professional ratings
Review scores
Source	Rating
PopMatters	7/10 stars

== Track listing ==
All songs written by Skye Sweetnam and Matt Drake except where noted.

No.	Title	Length
1.	"The Ugly"	4:56
2.	"Go Go Go"	3:18
3.	"Fighter"	4:04
4.	"Cry Murder"	3:52
5.	"Like a Killer"	3:57
6.	"Fuel My Fire" (Skye Sweetnam, Kenny Corke, Matt Drake, Ryan Leger)	3:50
7.	"We Ride"	4:20
8.	"Brave"	3:16
9.	"Get Off"	3:13
10.	"Crowd Control (Do What We Want)"	4:09
11.	"My Name Is Rock n' Roll"	3:43
Total length:		42:38

== Release history ==
Country	Date
Canada	June 10, 2014
