= Initiation (Sumo Cyco album) =

Studio album by Sumo Cyco
- Released: 7 May 2021
- Recorded: 2019–2021
- Length: 40:44
- Label: Napalm
- Producer: Matt Drake

Sumo Cyco chronology
Opus Mar (2017)	Initiation (2021)

Singles from Initiation
- 1. "Love You Wrong" Released: 7 May 2019; 2. "Run with the Giants" Released: 30 August 2019; 3. "Bystander" Released: 11 February 2021; 4. "No Surrender" Released: 11 March 2021; 5. "Vertigo" Released: 8 April 2021; 6. "Bad News" Released: 5 May 2021; 7. "Sun Eater" Released: 8 October 2021

Professional ratings
Review scores
Source	Rating
Kerrang!	4/5

Initiation is the third studio album by Canadian rock band Sumo Cyco, which was released on 7 May 2021. It was the last to feature drummer Matt Trozzi before his departure that year. The single "Bystander" was released with the announcement of the album. "Bad News" was the last single released prior to the album. The single "Sun Eater" was released alongside the deluxe version of the album on October 8, 2021.

== Track listing ==
All tracks are written by Skye Sweetnam and Matt Drake.

Initiation track listing
No.	Title	Length
1.	"Love You Wrong"	3:19
2.	"Bystander"	4:05
3.	"Vertigo"	3:09
4.	"Bad News"	3:54
5.	"No Surrender"	4:03
6.	"M.I.A."	3:31
7.	"Cyclone"	4:24
8.	"Run with the Giants"	3:52
9.	"Overdrive"	2:54
10.	"Power & Control"	3:03
11.	"The Dance Is Doomed"	4:30
12.	"Awakened [Bonus Track]"	3:44
Total length:		44:28

Initiation - Deluxe version
No.	Title	Length
13.	"New Jive"	2:54
14.	"We Are the Nation"	4:42
15.	"Sun Eater"	4:14
Total length:		56:45
