= Opus Mar =

Studio album by Sumo Cyco
- Released: 31 March 2017
- Recorded: 2015–2017
- Genre: Alternative metal; hard rock; punk rock; alternative rock
- Length: 49:45
- Label: Independent
- Producer: Matt Drake; James Loughrey

Sumo Cyco chronology
Lost in Cyco City (2014)	Opus Mar (2017)	Initiation (2021)

Singles from Sumo Cyco
- 1. "Anti-Anthem" Released: 30 September 2016; 2. "Move Mountains" Released: 1 February 2017

Opus Mar is the second studio album by Canadian rock band Sumo Cyco, released on 31 March 2017.

The band has released music videos for "Anti-Anthem" "Move Mountains", "Sleep Tight", and "Free Yourself".

== Track listing ==
All songs written by Skye Sweetnam and Matt Drake except "Move Mountains" (Sweetnam, Drake, Webbe).

No.	Title	Length
1.	"Anti-Anthem"	3:50
2.	"Free Yourself"	4:00
3.	"Move Mountains" (featuring Benji Webbe of Skindred)	3:33
4.	"Passengers"	4:17
5.	"Brave II"	3:52
6.	"Sleep Tight"	4:39
7.	"Rivalry"	3:17
8.	"Kids of Calamity"	3:27
9.	"Won't Put Me Out"	3:35
10.	"Words"	3:06
11.	"The Broadcasters (Murdering by Radio)"	3:56
12.	"Rally"	3:36
13.	"Building Castles"	4:37
Total length:		49:45
