= Number One (Skye Sweetnam song) =

Single by Skye Sweetnam

from the album Noise from the Basement
- Released: December 6, 2004
- Recorded: 2003
- Genre: Pop punk
- Length: 2:43
- Label: Capitol
- Songwriters: Skye Sweetnam, Paul Cafaro, Peter Konicek, Eric Dodd
- Producers: LCV, Skye Sweetnam

Skye Sweetnam singles chronology
"Tangled Up in Me" (2004)	"Number One" (2004)	"Human" (2007)

"Number One" is the third and final single released from Noise From the Basement, the 2004 debut album from Canadian musician Skye Sweetnam. The song was written by Skye Sweetnam, Paul Cafaro, Peter Konicek, and Eric Dodd. It was produced by LCV and by Sweetnam herself. Although this single did not make an impact on the singles charts, it did manage to peak at #22 on the Much Music Top 30 Countdown in 2005.

== Music video ==
The video starts with Skye entering her room, throwing her guitar bag on the floor and getting on her bed. Skye then walks to her mirror-table, applying some eye liner. She then puts on a pink dress and starts singing. She can also be seen walking down a hallway with the same dress, holding and playing on a little pink guitar. When the song is nearly in the end, Skye removes the dress and enters a room, where she starts playing with her band.

== Releases ==
These are the other releases/recordings of "Number One":

- "Number One" (WNBA version) – 1:02
- "Number One" (Video version) – 2:49
- "Number One" (Album version) – 2:43
