= Sound Soldier =

Studio album by Skye Sweetnam
- Released: October 30, 2007
- Recorded: 2005–2007
- Genre: Pop rock; rock
- Length: 40:35
- Label: EMI
- Producer: Tim Armstrong; The Matrix; Soulshock and Karlin

Skye Sweetnam chronology
Noise from the Basement (2004)	Sound Soldier (2007)

Singles from Sound Soldier
- 1. "Human" Released: September 14, 2007

Professional ratings
Review scores
Source	Rating
AllMusic	3.5/5 stars

Sound Soldier is the second studio album by Canadian singer-songwriter Skye Sweetnam. The album was released in Canada on October 30, 2007, and on February 14, 2008, in Japan with an exclusive song "Girl Like Me". The first single off the album is "Human", produced by the Matrix.

AllMusic felt that the "uncongealed" album does not hold together as one musical statement. The various song genres are "scattershot", displaying a wide range of influences such as teen pop, industrial metal, techno, pop rock, ska, pop punk and electronic music. This album was never released onto streaming platforms in the United States as the album was exclusive to Canada and Japan. In a recent YouTube live, Skye said that Sound Soldier was released when labels weren't thinking about streaming services heavily and that's a part of why it isn't on worldwide streaming. According to an Interview with Skye and Matt Drake, lead guitarist in her band Sumo Cyco, Sound Soldier didn't sell as well as the label wanted it to which led to Skye's career with Capitol to remain at a standstill. The commercial sales of this album led to Capitol Records not promoting Skye's career nearly as heavily as they did during her "Noise From The Basement" album rollout. After this standstill Skye went on to legally get out of her contract with Captiol Records because they were holding her career back. After Skye was free from her contract, she went on to form the band "Sumo Cyco" with her longterm guitarist Matt Drake. In another interview, Skye said that she asked Matt what he was doing when she was out of her contract and asked to start the band in which she leads in. This album was a sonic transition for Skye vocally and instrumentally and it was a good way to introduce her new sound in the band "Sumo Cyco" because heavier rock elements were more prevalent in this album.

== Track listing ==
Sound Soldier track listing
No.	Title	Writer(s)	Producer(s)	Length
1.	"Music Is My Boyfriend"	Skye Sweetnam; Lauren Christy; Scott Spock; Graham Edwards	The Matrix	3:27
2.	"Human"	Sweetnam; Christy; Spock; Edwards	The Matrix	3:11
3.	"Boyhunter" (featuring Ak'Sent)	Sweetnam; Christy; Spock; Edwards	The Matrix	3:19
4.	"Ghosts" (featuring Tim Armstrong)	Sweetnam; Armstrong	Armstrong	3:13
5.	"My Favorite Tune"	Sweetnam; Christy; Spock; Edwards	The Matrix	3:20
6.	"Scary Love"	Sweetnam; Christy; Spock; Edwards	The Matrix	3:46
7.	"(Let's Get Movin') Into Action" (featuring Tim Armstrong)	Sweetnam; Armstrong	Armstrong	3:40
8.	"Cartoon"	Sweetnam; Christy; Spock; Edwards	The Matrix	3:20
9.	"Make-Out Song"	Sweetnam; Christy; Spock; Edwards	The Matrix	3:03
10.	"Ultra"	Sweetnam; Christy; Spock; Edwards	The Matrix	3:13
11.	"Kiss a Girl"	Sweetnam; Carsten Schack; Kenneth Karlin; Alex Cantrall	Soulshock and Karlin	3:31
12.	"Babydoll Gone Wrong"	Sweetnam; Christy; Spock; Edwards	The Matrix	3:39
Total length:				40:35

Japanese bonus track
No.	Title	Writer(s)	Producer(s)	Length
13.	"Girl Like Me"	Sweetnam; Shelly Peiken; Max Martin; Lukasz Gottwald	Martin; Dr. Luke	3:09

== Charts ==
Chart performance for Sound Soldier
Chart	Peak position
Japanese International Albums Chart (Oricon)	161

== Release history ==
Release history for Sound Soldier
Country	Date
Canada	October 30, 2007
Japan	February 14, 2008
