= Skye Sweetnam =

Canadian singer (born 1988)

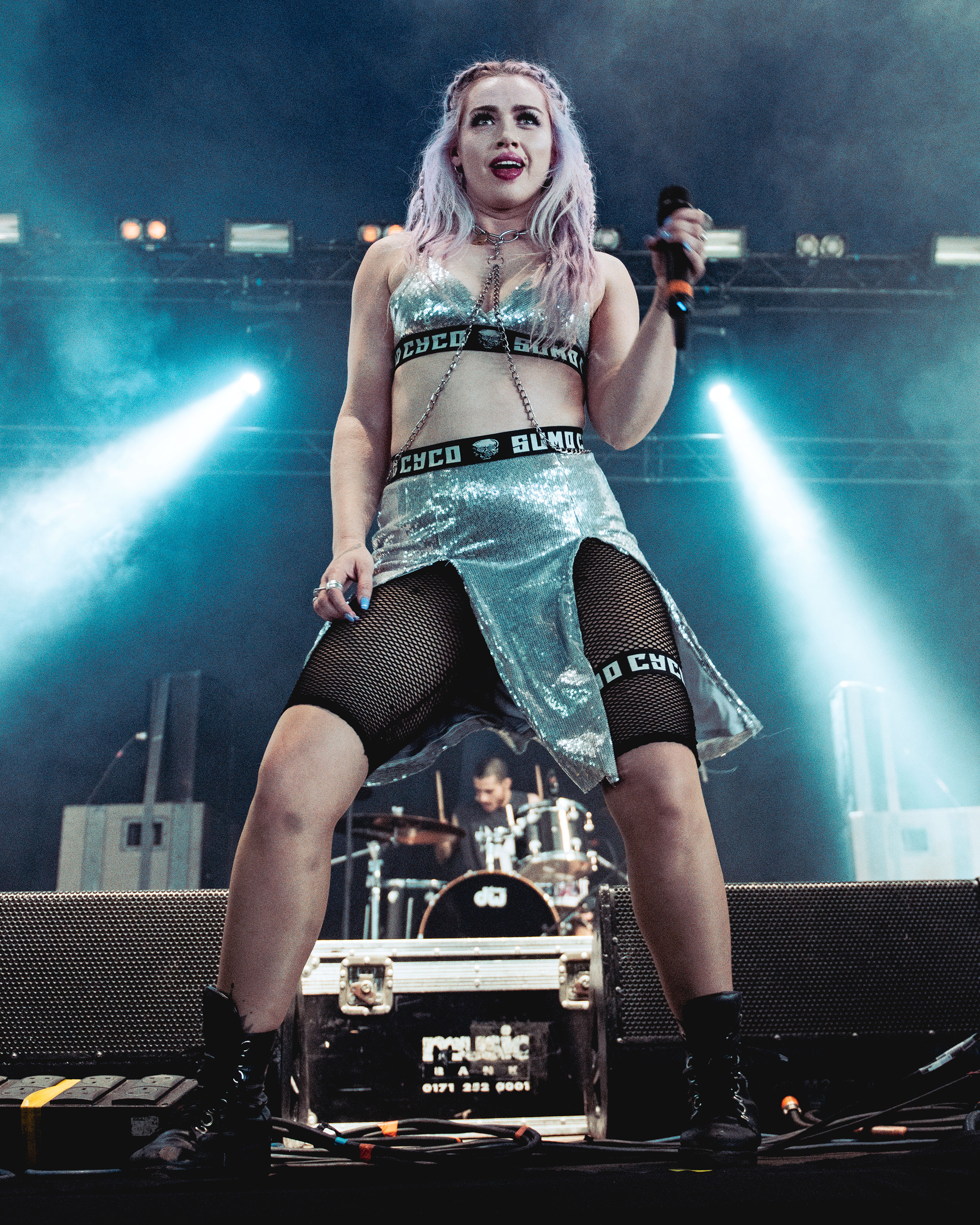
- Sweetnam (as Sever) with Sumo Cyco at Download Festival 2019

Background information
- Also known as: Sever
- Born: Skye Alexandra Sweetnam; May 5, 1988 (age 38); Bolton, Ontario, Canada
- Genres: Alternative metal; hard rock; pop-punk; pop rock
- Occupations: Singer; songwriter
- Years active: 2002–present
- Labels: Capitol; EMI; Napalm
- Member of: Sumo Cyco
- Website: sumocyco.com

Skye Alexandra Sweetnam (born May 5, 1988) is a Canadian singer and songwriter. She released two solo studio albums on Capitol Records/EMI — Noise from the Basement (2004) and Sound Soldier (2007) — and was nominated for a Juno Award for New Artist of the Year in 2006. Her 2003 debut single "Billy S." and its 2004 follow-up, "Tangled Up in Me", both charted in Canada, and she toured as an opening act for Britney Spears on the Onyx Hotel Tour in 2004. She is also known for voicing Barbie's singing parts in The Barbie Diaries (2006). Since 2011, she has been the lead vocalist of the alternative metal band Sumo Cyco, performing under the stage name Sever.

== Early life ==
Sweetnam was born on May 5, 1988, in Bolton, a community in Caledon, Ontario, to Deirdre and Greg Sweetnam. She was named after the Isle of Skye in Scotland. She has a sister, Aurora, and a brother, Cam. She began singing at the age of five and studied dancing and singing from a young age.

== Career ==
=== 2002–2006: Noise from the Basement ===
In 2002, Sweetnam began working with Canadian producer and instrumentalist James Robertson on material that became Noise from the Basement, released by Capitol Records/EMI. The album debuted at number 124 on the Billboard 200 and reached number 15 on the Oricon Album Charts in Japan. The lead single, "Billy S.", appeared in July 2003 on the soundtrack to the film How to Deal and reached number 15 on the Canadian Singles Chart. Two further singles, "Tangled Up in Me" and "Number One", followed. Sweetnam performed "Tangled Up in Me" on The Tonight Show with Jay Leno in September 2004 and was featured in Rolling Stone, Blender, Teen People, and Teen Vogue around the time of the album's release. In 2004, Sweetnam toured Europe and North America as the opening act for Britney Spears on the Onyx Hotel Tour.

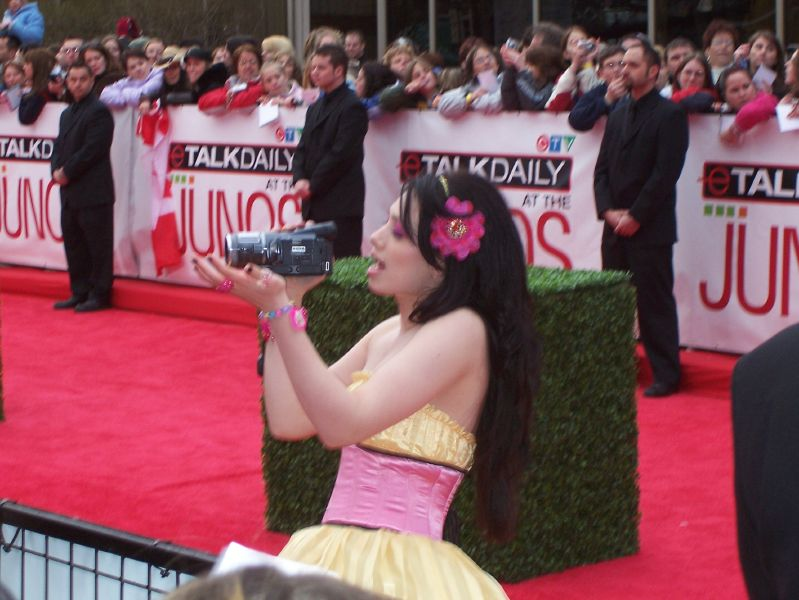
Sweetnam at the 2006 Juno Awards

Sweetnam provided the theme songs for several television series, including The Buzz on Maggie (Disney Channel), Wayside (Teletoon), and Radio Free Roscoe. She also recorded a cover of "Part of Your World" from The Little Mermaid for the compilation albums Disneymania 3 and DisneyRemixMania. In 2006, she provided the singing voice for Barbie in The Barbie Diaries, contributing four songs to the film's soundtrack. That same year, she was nominated for a Juno Award for New Artist of the Year.

=== 2007–2008: Sound Soldier ===
In March 2007, Sweetnam and Rancid frontman Tim Armstrong released the single "Into Action", written by Armstrong and featuring The Aggrolites. Sweetnam's second album, Sound Soldier, was released on October 30, 2007. Its lead single, "Human", was nominated for a 2008 MuchMusic Video Award for Best Cinematography. Sweetnam directed two of the album's music videos herself, for "Music Is My Boyfriend" and "Babydoll Gone Wrong".

"(Let's Get Movin') Into Action", a reworked version of the Armstrong collaboration, was used in the Canadian television series Degrassi: The Next Generation and appeared in the films Hotel for Dogs and Ramona and Beezus.

Sweetnam also recorded "Where I Want to Be" for Jun Senoue's album The Works and directed music videos for Leah Daniels and the band Ashes.

=== 2009–present: Sumo Cyco ===
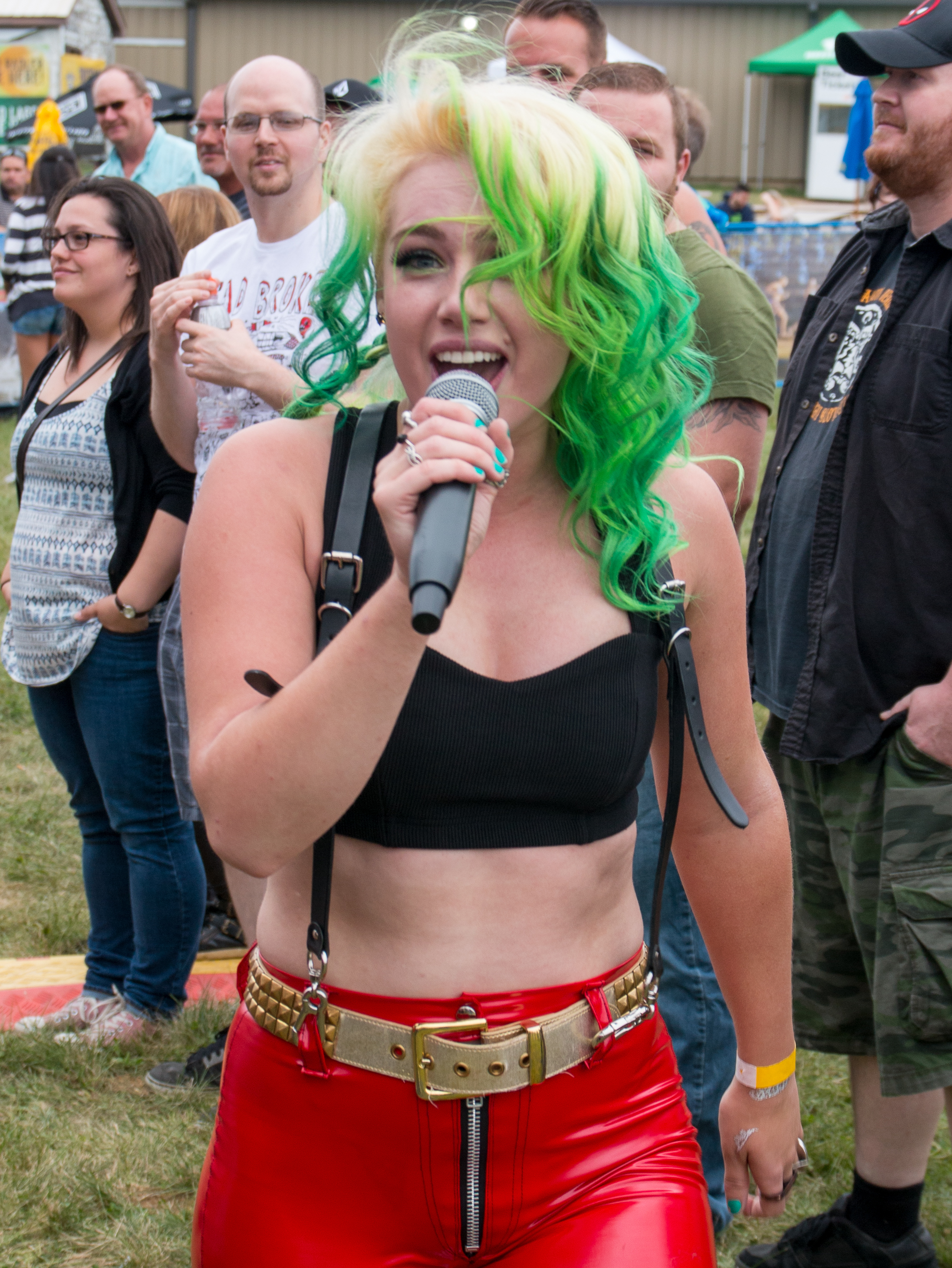
Sweetnam performing for Sumo Cyco at 2015 Festival of Friends in Ancaster, ON

In 2009, Sweetnam began working on new material and formed Sumo Cyco, a four-piece alternative metal and punk rock band, adopting the stage name Sever. The band made their live debut opening for Hollywood Undead in Toronto in April 2011.

In April and May 2014, Sumo Cyco toured Ireland and the United Kingdom after performing at Indie Week Ireland. Their debut album, Lost in Cyco City, was released on June 10, 2014 in Canada. In 2015, the band signed with TKO (The Kirby Organization) Booking Agency for worldwide representation.

Sumo Cyco's second album, Opus Mar, followed in 2017. In January 2020, the band signed with Napalm Records, which released their third album, Initiation, on May 7, 2021. Their fourth album, Neon Void, was released independently in October 2025 and received positive reviews from outlets including Blabbermouth.net and Dead Rhetoric.

== Filmography ==
Year	Title	Role	Notes
2003–2005	Radio Free Roscoe	Herself / Sydney DeLuca	Theme song singer; guest appearance in "The Bad Boy"
2004	Switched!	Herself	Episode: "Megan/Skye"
2005–2006	The Buzz on Maggie	Herself	Theme song singer
2005–2008	Wayside	Herself	Theme song singer
2006	The Barbie Diaries	Barbie	Singing voice
2011	My Life Me	Herself	Theme song singer

== Discography ==
Sweetnam released two solo studio albums and five singles. By 2007, she had sold approximately 160,000 albums worldwide and 154,000 singles digital downloads in the United States.

=== Solo studio albums ===
Title	Album details	Peak chart positions		Sales
Title	Album details	JPN	US	Sales
Noise from the Basement	Release date: September 21, 2004; Label: Capitol, EMI; Format: CD, digital download	15	124	CAN: 13,000; JPN: 69,000; US: 71,000
Sound Soldier	Release date: October 30, 2007; Label: EMI Canada; Format: CD, digital download	161	—	
"—" denotes an album that did not chart or was not released

=== With Sumo Cyco ===
- Lost in Cyco City (2014)
- Opus Mar (2017)
- Initiation (2021)
- Neon Void (2025)

=== Singles ===
List of singles, with selected chart positions, showing year released and album name
Title	Year	Peak chart positions				Album
Title	Year	CAN	FRA	ITA	US Pop	Album
"Billy S."	2003	15	92	—	—	How to Deal
"Tangled Up in Me"	2004	—	—	35	37	Noise from the Basement
"Number One"	2004	—	—	—	—	Noise from the Basement
"Superstar"	2005	—	—	—	—	Non-album single
"Human"	2007	—	—	—	—	Sound Soldier
"—" denotes a track that did not chart or was not released

=== Music videos ===
Year	Title	Album	Director(s)
2002	"Imaginary Superstar"	Noise from the Basement	Skye Sweetnam
2002	"Shattered"	Noise from the Basement	Skye Sweetnam, James Robertson
2003	"Billy S."	Noise from the Basement	Unknown
2003	Radio Free Roscoe Theme	Radio Free Roscoe	Unknown
2004	"Tangled Up in Me"	Noise from the Basement	Jake Nava
2005	"Number One"	Noise from the Basement	Wendy Morgan
2005	"Just the Way I Am"	The Buzz on Maggie	Unknown
2005	"Superstar"	Noise from the Basement	N/A
2006	"This Is Me"	The Barbie Diaries	Unknown
2007	"Music Is My Boyfriend"	Sound Soldier	Skye Sweetnam
2007	"Human"	Sound Soldier	Sean Wainsteim
2008	"Babydoll Gone Wrong"	Sound Soldier	Skye Sweetnam
2008	"(Let's Get Movin') Into Action"	Sound Soldier	Sean Wainsteim

== Awards and nominations ==
Year	Award	Category	Nominated work	Result
2006	Juno Awards	New Artist of the Year	Herself	Nominated
2008	MuchMusic Video Award	Best Cinematography	"Human"	Nominated

== See also ==
- List of Skye Sweetnam songs
