= Tangled Up in Me =

2004 single by Skye Sweetnam

Single by Skye Sweetnam

from the album Noise from the Basement
- Released: March 9, 2004
- Genre: Rock
- Length: 2:52
- Label: Captiol
- Songwriters: Aslyn; Jimmy Harry; Skye Sweetnam; James Robertson
- Producers: Andrew Slater; Julian Raymond; Howard Willing

Skye Sweetnam singles chronology
"Billy S." (2003)	"Tangled Up in Me" (2004)	"Number One" (2004)

"Tangled Up in Me" is a song recorded by Canadian musician Skye Sweetnam. It was released as the first single from Sweetnam's debut album Noise From the Basement on March 9, 2004, through Capitol Records. The song was written by Skye Sweetnam, James Robertson, Heather Mitchell, and Jimmy Harry. The song became Sweetnam's best-charting single in the United States after it was featured in an episode of MTV's Laguna Beach: The Real Orange County, reaching number 37 on the Billboard Mainstream Top 40. It also reached the top 40 in Italy. The song has sold 94,000 copies in the United States as of June 2007.

== Music video ==
The music video shows Skye Sweetnam performing with her band, becoming tangled up in wires. The music video received play on Canada's MuchMusic channel.

== Personnel ==
Personnel are taken from the US promo CD liner notes.

- Aslyn – writing
- James Harry – writing
- Skye Sweetnam – writing, vocals
- James Robertson – writing
- Andrew Slater – production
- Julian Raymond – production
- Howard Willing – production, engineering
- Tom Lord-Alge – mixing

== Charts ==
Weekly chart performance for "Tangled Up in Me"
Chart (2004)	Peak position
Italy (FIMI)	35
US Mainstream Top 40 (Billboard)	37

== Release history ==
Release dates and formats for "Tangled Up in Me"
Region	Date	Format	Label	Ref.
United States	March 9, 2004	Digital download	Capitol	
United States	June 21, 2004	Contemporary hit radio	Capitol	
United States	August 24, 2004	CD single	Capitol	
