= Lego City Undercover: The Chase Begins =

2013 action-adventure video game

- Cover art depicting Chase McCain (left) and Rex Fury (right) in the foreground
- Developer: TT Fusion
- Publisher: Nintendo
- Director: Nick Elms
- Producers: Azusa Tajima; Masakazu Miyazaki; Rob Shepherd
- Designers: Mike Bareham; Nolan Worthington
- Programmer: Patrick Senior
- Writers: Graham Goring; Mike Bareham
- Composers: Simon Withenshaw; Suddi Raval; Paul Weir
- Platform: Nintendo 3DS
- Release: NA: April 21, 2013; EU: April 26, 2013; AU: April 27, 2013
- Genre: Action-adventure
- Mode: Single-player

Lego City Undercover: The Chase Begins is an action-adventure game developed by TT Fusion and published by Nintendo for the Nintendo 3DS. Released in April 2013, it is based on the Lego City theme and serves as a prequel to Lego City Undercover, released one month prior for the Wii U. Set two years before the events of the original game, The Chase Begins follows rookie cop Chase McCain as he attempts to arrest Rex Fury, the city's most wanted criminal.

First announced at E3 2011 as Lego City Stories, the title was designed as a distinct game from its Wii U counterpart, incorporating 3DS-specific features while aiming for an immersive open world within the console's technical limitations. Several locations have been modified, and the game features a more linear progression structure, with missions taking place directly in the overworld as bite-sized tasks, replacing the Wii U version's longer, self-contained levels.

Lego City Undercover: The Chase Begins received mixed reviews from critics, who praised its charm, amount of content, and diverse missions, but criticized the lack of challenge and repetitive gameplay. While its ambition to create a large open world on the 3DS received praise, technical issues, such as long loading times, the short render distance, and an unstable framerate, were criticized. The game sold over 2 million units worldwide as of December 31, 2020.

== Gameplay ==
Lego City Undercover: The Chase Begins is an action-adventure game set in an open world in which the player fights crime in Lego City as police officer Chase McCain. The player targets gangs by chasing after criminals, building Lego objects by breaking apart and repurposing other objects, and finding collectible items like outfits. The world is generally split into seven districts, each of which are locked off until the player defeats the boss of a gang in a certain district. With each district, a new gang is introduced, and the player unlocks a new outfit which helps navigate the environment. The missions usually involve fighting characters, platforming sections, and fetch quests. The player can drive vehicles across the map, and helicopters are used to fast travel between different locations.

Compared to its Wii U counterpart, where missions take place in standalone levels, The Chase Begins follows a more linear approach in which missions take place directly in the city. The missions are shorter and simpler than in the Wii U game.

== Plot ==
The Chase Begins takes place two years before the events of Lego City Undercover. Chase McCain has just joined the Lego City Police Department and begins his career by helping apprehend the criminal Knuckles Gang. His superior, Deputy Dunby, sends Chase undercover to the Albatross Island prison, where the inmates have imprisoned the guards and are preparing for a mass break-out. Though Chase frees the Warden and stops most of the inmates, five high profile criminals manage to escape, including Rex Fury. Police Chief Gleeson believes Rex to be behind the breakout as part of a larger plan, explaining that while he is a suspect in a series of robbery cases, his guilt has never been proven due to operating in disguise.

While investigating the escapees' activities, Chase meets news reporter Natalia Kowalski, and the two develop a mutual attraction. Chase goes undercover to discover the escaped criminals' plans, including a theft of construction equipment, construction of a satellite surveillance system, and an attempt to prevent a space shuttle launch. While at the rocket launch site, Chase encounters Natalia again, and agrees to help her rescue her scientist father Henrik from the criminals. Chase frees Henrik, but Natalia is subsequently taken hostage. Chase rescues her, and Natalia identifies Rex Fury as her kidnapper. Realizing that being a witness to Rex's undisguised crimes puts her in danger, Gleeson has Chase take her to a safehouse for her protection.

While preventing a series of bombings, Chase overhears escapee Carl Walnuts meeting with wealthy industrialist Forrest Blackwell, who aided the criminals so they could destroy Bluebell Woods and he could use the land for a construction project, though Chase remains unaware of Blackwell's identity. Chase stops Walnuts, but is ambushed by Rex. Chase accidentally reveals Natalia is alive, leading Rex to kidnap her again and stage a series of arson attacks across Lego City. Chase rescues Natalia and puts out the fires, but learns they were a distraction from Rex's true target, the Lego City Bank. Chase prevents Rex's robbery, and the two engage in a vehicle chase across the city until being thrown from a moving truck to the police station, where Dunby and the press are waiting. Rex is arrested, but Chase suffers a concussion upon landing, and in his stupor, he accidentally reveals Natalia as a key witness against Rex on camera. As a result, Natalia goes into witness protection. Dunby takes credit for Fury's arrest and forcibly transfers Chase, now promoted to detective, to the other side of the world.

== Development ==
Lego City Undercover: The Chase Begins was announced during Nintendo's press conference at E3 2011 on June 7, 2011, with the tentative name Lego City Stories. On January 17, 2013, the game was revealed to be named Lego City Undercover: The Chase Begins, and that it would be a prequel to the Wii U game. It was released in April 2013.

From the beginning, the developers had the vision to make The Chase Begins and its Wii U counterpart "two very different games". Features exclusive to the Nintendo 3DS, such as StreetPass, its touchscreen and gyroscope, were incorporated into the game. Developers focused on creating an open world that would feel as immersive and realistic as possible while considering the technical limitations of the 3DS. Some of the game world's features include a traffic system, free roam gameplay, and side missions, the latter with a focus to also take place on the city's rooftops. As the game takes place two years prior to the Wii U game, several locations have intentionally been modified.

On December 22, 2020, Lego City Undercover: The Chase Begins was removed from the Nintendo eShop, along with the original Wii U game.

== Reception ==
Reception

Aggregate score
Aggregator	Score
Metacritic	62/100

Review scores
Publication	Score
Destructoid	5.5/10
Eurogamer	7/10
Famitsu	32/40
Game Informer	6/10
GameRevolution	8/10
GameZone	7.5/10
IGN	6.3/10
Nintendo Life	6/10
Nintendo World Report	5.5/10
Official Nintendo Magazine	64%
Pocket Gamer	3.5/5
Digital Spy	3/5
Metro	3/10

Lego City Undercover: The Chase Begins received "mixed" reviews according to the review aggregation website Metacritic. Reviews praised the game's ambition to create a large open world on the limited hardware of the Nintendo 3DS. Chris Vandergaag of Toronto Sun and Peter Nowak of The Globe and Mail enjoyed its high amount of content and collectibles. IGN's Richard George and Official Nintendo Magazine's Chris Scullion negatively noted the game's dense fog, long loading times, and unstable framerate. While Scullion found the game overall "technically impressive(ish)", he said navigating the world with its thick layers of fog and low density of non-player characters (NPCs) makes it feel "like you're wandering around a post-apocalyptic LEGO City", and compared the game's look to Silent Hill.

IGN's George described the story and characters as "charming, memorable and incredibly funny", but noted that compared to the Wii U game, its gameplay and humor "are compromised, leaving something that is just decent." Liam Martin of Digital Spy similarly praised the game's charm and "great cast of characters", while also enjoying its "mostly impressive visuals" and diverse missions and bosses.

Nowak of The Globe and Mail criticized the game structure as repetitive, summarizing it as: "McCain goes to a new location in the city; discovers a new costume/ability; uses it to fetch some items a few times; fights a bunch of thugs along the way with a boss battle at the end of each section; then he gets a second new ability." He also found the fights to occur too frequently and lack challenge. Chad Sapieha of National Post considered the gameplay monotone, describing the objectives as "largely composed of simple fetch or fix scenarios", and similarly found the fights too frequent and their execution mediocre and repetitive: "Every fight plays out in almost identical fashion: a couple of button taps to throw a suspect down, another to cuff him. It grows tedious quickly."

Mike LeChevallier of Slant Magazine gave it two stars out of five, saying, "With a full-bodied hike in attention to detail, The Chase Begins could have been a satisfying alternative for Lego fans who haven't yet obtained a Wii U, or simply gamers who've been bellowing for a well-made 3DS addition to the franchise. Disappointingly, what they've been allotted is a tattered set of hand-me-down Lego blocks, mismatched and marked with the fingerpaint smudges of those who've grown up and moved on to Minecraft." David Jenkins of Metro said, "The Wii U game was just a few flaws short of a minor classic, but this joyless companion piece is only a couple more problems shy of a complete disaster."

Between April 7th and May 4th of 2013, Lego City Undercover: The Chase Begins had sold 94,000 copies in the United States, including both physical and digital sales. On 12 September 2013, Nintendo announced that the game has sold 264,000 units in North America. As of December 31, 2020, worldwide sales reached 2.04 million copies, making it the 34th best-selling game for the Nintendo 3DS.
