= Billy S. =

2003 single by Skye Sweetnam

Single by Skye Sweetnam

from the album How to Deal and Noise from the Basement
- B-side: "Wild World"
- Released: May 19, 2003
- Length: 2:15
- Label: Capitol
- Songwriters: Skye Sweetnam; James Robertson
- Producers: James Robertson; Skye Sweetnam

Skye Sweetnam singles chronology
"Billy S." (2003)	"Tangled Up in Me" (2004)

"Billy S." is a song by Canadian musician Skye Sweetnam. It was released as her debut major label single in 2003. "Billy S." reached number 15 on the Canadian Singles Chart and also charted in France and the Flanders region of Belgium. The song was featured on the soundtrack to the movie How to Deal.

== Song information ==
The song's title, "Billy S." stands for Billy Shakespeare, a reference to William Shakespeare, whom Skye refers to throughout the song. The song contains numerous Shakespeare references including Juliet from Romeo and Juliet, Malvolio from Twelfth Night and the phrase "To be, or not to be" from Hamlet, which is changed to "To skip or not to skip, that is the question". Sweetnam thought that the title "Billy Shakespeare" was too long, and decided to shorten it.

== Music video ==
The music video for "Billy S.", filmed in Southern California, features Skye Sweetnam recording herself singing into a handheld camera. The video then goes on to show Sweetnam editing the video on a computer. The video also features scenes from the movie How to Deal. Skye is also shown, while making her video, gathering a group of people for the purpose of throwing a party and ultimately skipping school, walking triumphantly past the (school) bus. The video received regular airplay on MuchMusic and YTV.

== Track listings ==
Canadian CD single

1. "Billy S."
2. "Wild World"

European CD single

1. "Billy S."
2. "Tidal Wave"

French DVD single

1. "Billy S."
2. "Tidal Wave"
3. "Billy S." (video)

== Charts ==
Weekly chart performance for "Billy S."
Chart (2003–2005)	Peak position
Belgium (Ultratip Bubbling Under Flanders)	3
Canada (Nielsen SoundScan)	15
France (SNEP)	92

== Release history ==
Release dates and formats for "Tangled Up in Me"
Region	Date	Format	Label	Ref.
United States	May 19, 2003	Contemporary hit radio	Capitol	
United States	July 22, 2003	CD single	Capitol	
Germany	November 24, 2003	CD single	EMI	
