= Sumo Cyco =

Canadian rock band

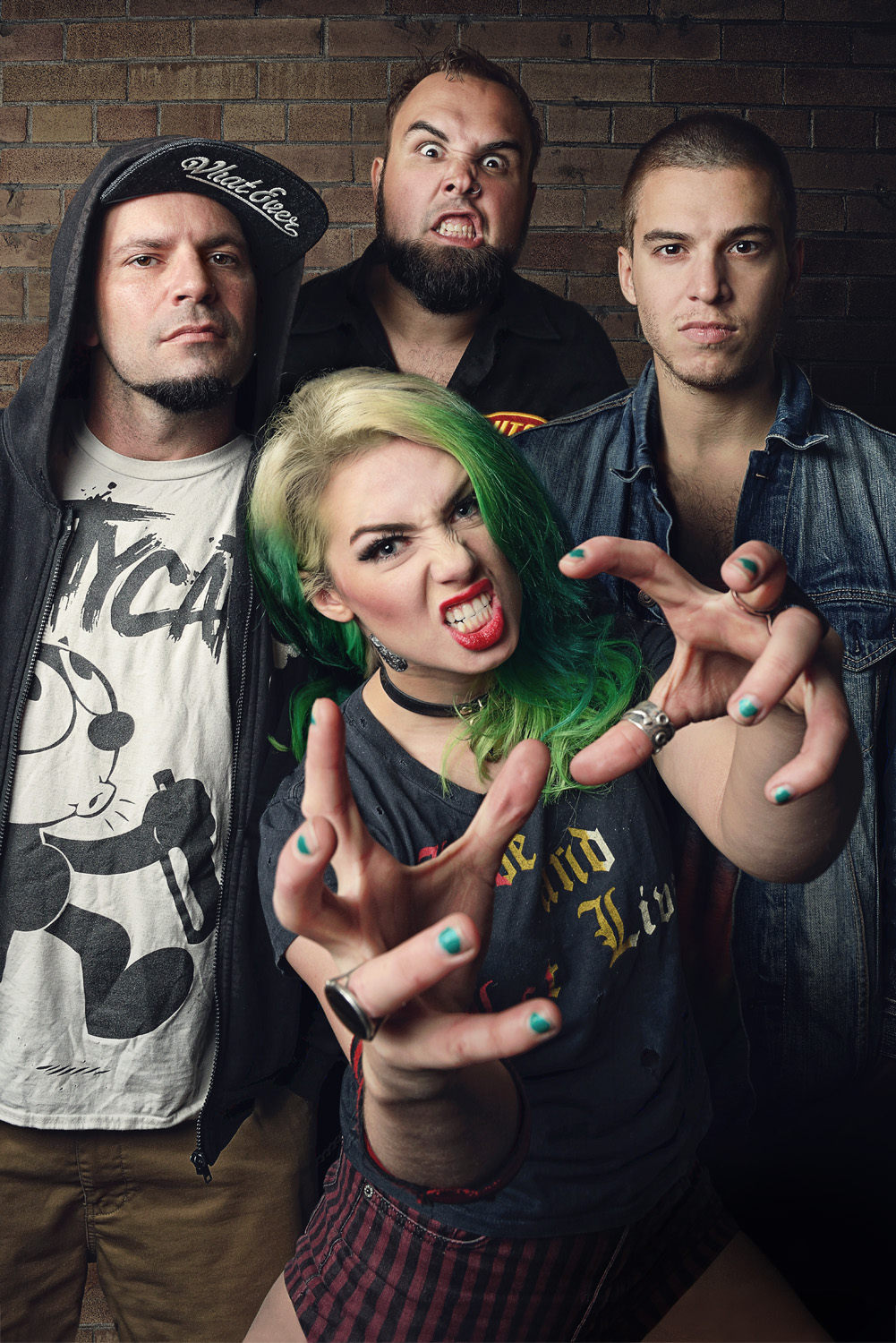
- Sumo Cyco in 2015

Background information
- Origin: Hamilton, Ontario, Canada
- Genres: Alternative metal; hard rock; punk rock; alternative rock
- Years active: 2011–present
- Label: Napalm
- Members: Skye Sweetnam; Matt Drake; Oscar Anesetti; Joey Muha
- Past members: Ryan Leger; Andy Joseph; Ken Corke; Matt Trozzi
- Website: sumocyco.com

Sumo Cyco is a Canadian rock band from Hamilton, Ontario, consisting of lead vocalist Skye Sweetnam, guitarist Matt Drake, bassist Oscar Anesetti, and drummer Joey Muha. The band emerged as a punk-metal act in 2011 and has since released three studio albums and numerous singles.

== History ==
=== 2011–2013: Formation ===
Sumo Cyco launched in March 2011 and had their first show, opening for Hollywood Undead, in April of that year, performing to a crowd of a thousand. In 2012 they won Best Female-Fronted Band at the Toronto Independent Music Awards. They also won at Indie Week Toronto, October 20, 2013, and attended Indie Week Ireland in Limerick in April 2014.

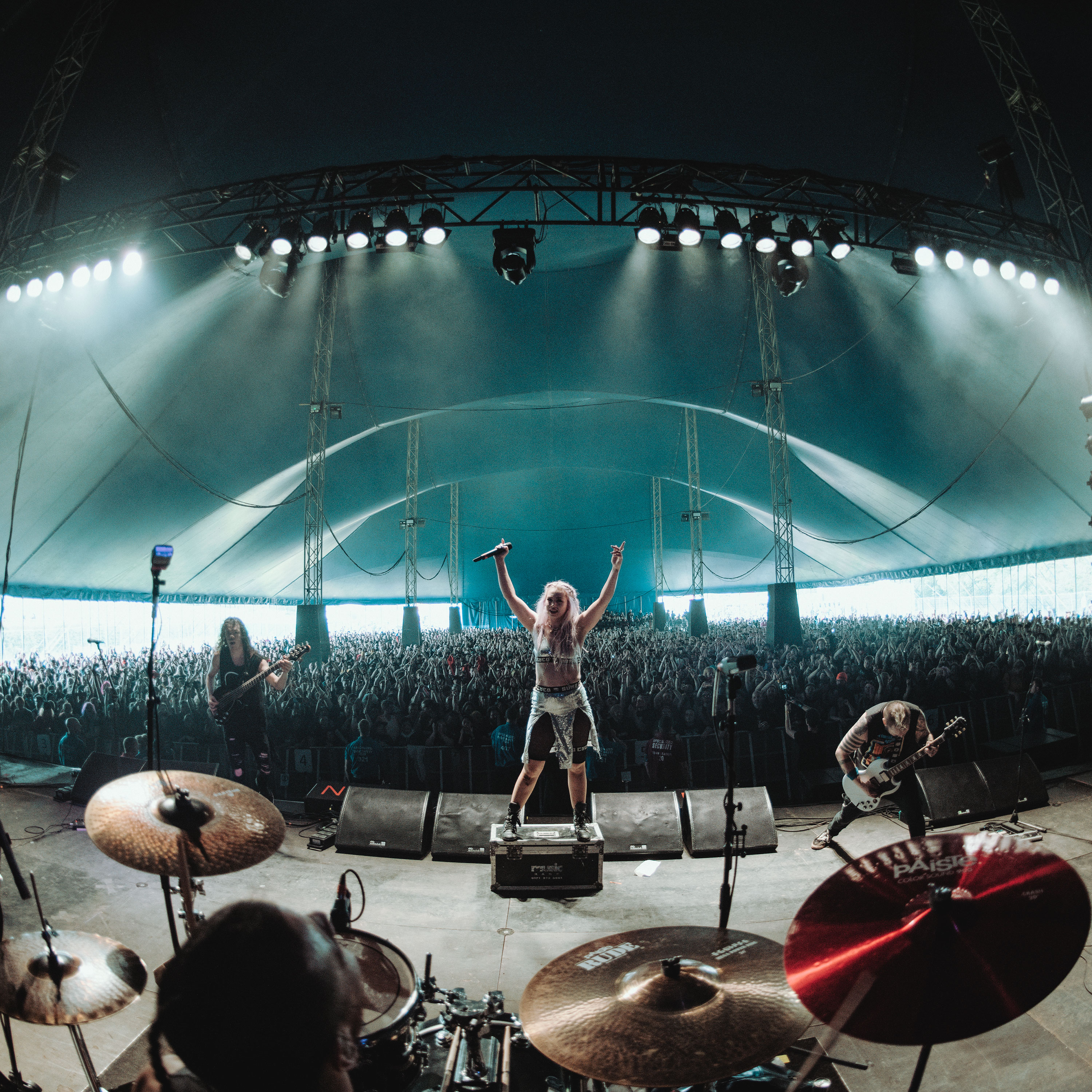
Sumo Cyco performing at Download Festival 2019, in England

=== 2014–2016: Lost in Cyco City ===
On June 10, 2014, the band released their first album, Lost in Cyco City.

In April 2016, their song "Fighter" was announced as the theme song for the World Darts Association's (WDA) 2016 Merseyside Open.

=== 2017–2020: Opus Mar and touring ===
On March 31, 2017, it was announced via Twitter that Sumo Cyco would release their sophomore album, titled Opus Mar. The record includes a guest appearance by Benji Webbe of Skindred, on the single "Move Mountains", released on February 1, 2017.

Sumo Cyco opened the main stage for the Offspring at the Sound of Music outdoor festival on June 10, 2017.

In October 2017, the band travelled to New Zealand to open for Devilskin on their seven-date cross-country tour.

Starting on April 25, 2018, they opened for Butcher Babies and Nonpoint on their co-headline tour.

On June 14, Sumo Cyco played the Kerrang! Avalanche Stage at Download Festival 2019.

In September 2019, they joined Jinjer and the Browning for a 44-date tour of North America.

In December 2019, Sumo Cyco announced that they would be opening for Wednesday 13 and the 69 Eyes on a tour through the US, from January 24 through February 22, 2020.

=== 2021–present: Initiation ===
On May 7, 2021, the band released their third album, Initiation. A deluxe version was issued on October 8, 2021, featuring the new single "Sun Eater".

== Band members ==
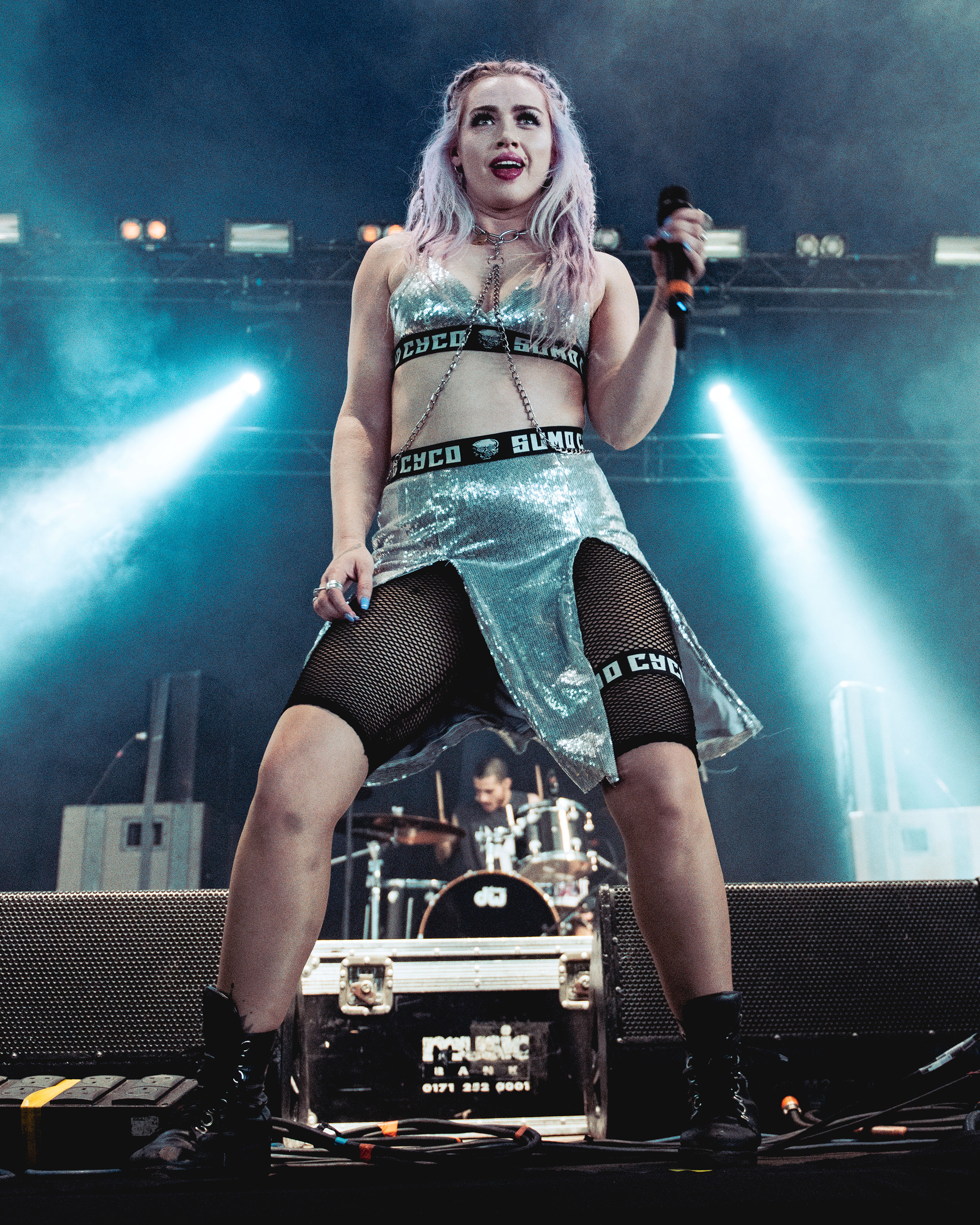
Skye Sweetnam & Matt Trozzi in 2019

Current

- Skye Sweetnam – lead vocals (2011–present)
- Matt Drake – guitars, backing vocals (2011–present)
- Oscar Anesetti – bass, backing vocals (2017–present)
- Joey Muha – drums (2021–present)

Past

- Ken "Thor" Corke – bass (2011–2017)
- Ryan "Legs" Leger – drums (2011–2013)
- Andy "Wolf" Joseph – drums (2013–2016)
- Matt Trozzi – drums (2016–2021)

Timeline

== Discography ==
=== Studio albums ===
- Lost in Cyco City (2014)
- Opus Mar (2017)
- Initiation (2021)
- Neon Void (2025)

=== Singles ===
Year	Titles	Length
2011	"Limp"	3:38
2011	"Mercy"	3:22
2011	"Interceptor"	2:48
2011	"Danger"	3:16
2012	"Who Do You Want to Be?" (Oingo Boingo cover)	3:33
2012	"Loose Cannon"	3:53
2012	"Where Do We Go?"	4:04
2013	"The Ugly"	4:56
2014	"Go Go Go"	3:18
2014	"Cry Murder"	3:52
2014	"Brave"	3:17
2015	"Fighter"	4:27
2015	"Like a Killer"	4:04
2016	"Fuel My Fire"	3:50
2016	"Crowd Control"	4:10
2016	"Anti Anthem"	3:50
2017	"Move Mountains" (featuring Benji Webbe)	3:45
2017	"Sleep Tight"	4:41
2017	"New Rules (Dua Lipa Cover)"	3:38
2018	"Free Yourself (Featuring Lars)"	4:55
2018	"Undefeated"	4:12
2019	"Love You Wrong"	3:20
2019	"Run with the Giants"	3:53
2021	"Bystander"	4:05
2021	"No Surrender"	4:28
2021	"Vertigo"	4:10
2021	"Bad News"	3:54
2021	"Sun Eater"	4:14
2025	"Villains"	3:23
2025	"Shivers"	3:33
2025	"Asteroid"	2:53
