= Lego City Undercover =

2013 action-adventure video game

- Box art for the Wii U version
- Developer: TT Fusion
- Publishers: Nintendo (Wii U); Warner Bros. Interactive Entertainment
- Directors: Erin Roberts (Wii U); Mike Taylor and Chris Wyatt (other versions)
- Producers: Masakazu Miyazaki; Azusa Tajima; Tim Welch
- Designer: Lee Barber
- Programmers: Phil Owen; Tom Matthews
- Artists: Paul Jones; Louise Andrew
- Writer: Graham Goring
- Composer: Paul Weir
- Platforms: Wii U; Nintendo Switch; PlayStation 4; Windows; Xbox One
- Release: Wii U: NA: 18 March 2013; PAL: 28 March 2013; Other versions: NA: 4 April 2017; EU: 7 April 2017; AU: 12 April 2017
- Genre: Action-adventure
- Mode: Single-player, multiplayer (non-Wii U versions only)

Lego City Undercover is a 2013 action-adventure game developed by TT Fusion and published by Nintendo for the Wii U. It was re-released for the Nintendo Switch, PlayStation 4, Windows, and Xbox One by Warner Bros. Interactive Entertainment in 2017. It is based on the City-themed toyline by Lego, and is the first Traveller's Tales Lego video game on a home console since Bionicle Heroes (2006) not to be based on a licensed property. The game follows police officer Chase McCain as he returns to Lego City and pursues escaped crime boss Rex Fury. Gameplay features McCain both exploring the open world hub of Lego City, and completing self-contained levels featuring puzzles and combat.

After satisfactory technical advancements and the completion of other Lego video games featuring existing IPs, the first prototypes for Lego City Undercover were produced in 2010, with development beginning in 2011 after Nintendo approached parent company TT Games about developing for the Wii U. At the time production began, it was to be the first Lego video game featuring voice acting, and it was the first in the TT Games Lego series not to rely on a movie or comic license. The script, written by Graham Goring, made extensive use of parody and references to various media. The Lego City hub was based on multiple real locations. Nintendo was generally hands-off with the development process but would receive updates and suggest changes.

The game was originally announced at E3 2011 as Lego City Stories for Wii U and Nintendo 3DS. Additional info was shown at E3 2012, where the game was also officially renamed to Lego City Undercover. The 3DS version became a standalone prequel, titled Lego City Undercover: The Chase Begins. Lego City Undercover was released in most regions in March 2013, with Japan following in July. The remastered version, which included local two-player multiplayer, was announced in 2016 and released in April 2017. The game received generally positive reviews from critics, who praised the story, humour, and evolved gameplay formula, but criticized the lack of co-op options and varying technical issues, such as long loading times. The original Wii U version sold over 1.15 million copies worldwide as of 31 December 2022.

== Gameplay ==
Chase engages in combat with aggressive criminals.

Lego City Undercover is an action-adventure game in which the player controls undercover cop Chase McCain, who is tasked with detaining the criminal Rex Fury. Chase can perform various moves such as swinging across poles and performing wall jumps. The game is set in Lego City, which serves as an overworld that contains levels set in different environments split up in 20 districts. Each level has a set of linear objectives that must be completed to reach the end, which can involve solving puzzles, building and breaking Lego bricks, and platforming challenges. Chase engages in combat with criminals that require button combinations to fight them. As the game progresses, Chase learns new abilities in the form of "disguises" that replicate occupations and personas; the abilities from the disguises are used in levels and exploring previously inaccessible content and areas in the overworld. For example, the miner disguise can smash through boulders with its pickaxe and grabs a dynamite out of the dynamite machine, and the criminal disguise can break through doors with a crowbar and can crack safes open.

In the overworld, puzzles and collectibles are also hidden, such as timed challenges and car chases. The player is allowed to use any vehicle in the environment to reach their location, including boats, helicopters, and the vehicles of other citizens. Lego studs serve as the game's currency, and can be found in the environment or by solving puzzles. Studs can be used to purchase new vehicles that can be summoned and used at the player's discretion. A rarer form of currency, called Super Bricks, often require more difficult platforming or puzzle-solving to collect. Super Bricks are used to complete "superbuilds", which vary in use when completed, such as a structure to summon vehicles or stunt ramps. The Wii U GamePad is used to further progress with multiple features, including scanning for Lego brick locations, taking photo evidence, and listening to private conversations. When these features are not being used, the GamePad displays a map of the environment. The 2017 re-release of the game added local multiplayer.

== Plot ==
Police detective Chase McCain returns to Lego City after being exiled two years prior. (Note: As depicted in Lego City Undercover: The Chase Begins) He learns from Mayor Gleeson that notorious criminal Rex Fury, whom Chase helped to arrest, recently escaped from prison. Chase is joined by dim-witted rookie Frank Honey and assisted by police technician Ellie Phillips in pursuing Rex. Chase is unwelcome to Natalia Kowalski, Chase's ex-girlfriend, who was forced into witness protection after he inadvertently revealed her as the witness in Rex's trial. Marion Dunby, the city's new Chief of Police, sent Chase away because of this mistake.

After dealing with several minor cases, Chase manages to gather clues that lead him to encountering Rex at Bluebell Mine, but is defeated before he can arrest him. Pressured by Gleeson, Dunby sends Chase undercover within a limousine company owned by criminal gang leader Chan Chuang. He works as a driver for billionaire Forrest Blackwell and steals a car for Chan. He encounters Natalia, who is searching for her missing father, and learns from her that Chan is working for a crime boss named Vinnie Pappalardo, who is very distrustful of strangers. To gain Vinnie's trust, Chase uses a prison transport truck from the police department to break Vinnie's cousin Moe DeLuca out of prison. In return, Moe helps Chase get into Vinnie's gang by having him steal a truck full of color guns and then deliver it to Vinnie's ice cream parlor. Chase is then tasked to steal a valuable stone called the Bell Pepper Emerald, and then steal a Moon buggy for Chan. Later, Natalia is captured while investigating Chan's connection to her father's disappearance; when Chase rescues her, she accepts his help in finding her father.

After rescuing Natalia from a group of mysterious men and partially reconciling with her, Chase later discovers that Vinnie is working for Rex. When Vinnie learns he will not be paid for his work and is ordered to steal more items for his buyer, he instructs Chase to steal from Blackwell. After breaking into his mansion but failing to secure any valuables due to being pursued by Blackwell's security forces, Chase returns to Vinnie's ice cream parlor, only to find it overrun by Rex's thugs and Vinnie locked in a freezer in retaliation for defying Rex's orders. Chase saves Vinnie from Rex's thugs and, after interrogating the thugs' leader, takes their place to learn what Rex is planning.

Chase manages to infiltrate Rex's hideout and overhears Natalia's father, lunar scientist Henrik Kowalski, being interrogated by Rex. He discovers that Blackwell himself organized the crime wave and kidnapped Natalia to coerce her father to work on his plans. Rescuing Kowalski, Chase calls Ellie with what he has learned, whereupon she informs him that Blackwell had recently been in the news with promises that he had plans that would change Lego City forever. Proceeding to Blackwell's mansion, he searches it to find evidence of Blackwell's crimes and locate Natalia. Chase soon discovers that Blackwell originally had plans to build an apartment complex and shopping mall in Bluebell National Park, but was stopped by Lego City due to the presence of an endangered squirrel species in the park. Humiliated and enraged at being denied, Blackwell built a colony on the Moon and converted his high-rise Blackwell Tower into a rocket, which Chase discovers will burn Lego City when it is launched. Chase quickly has Henrik and the police department build a force field to prevent the rocket's engines from destroying the city.

Learning that Blackwell still has Natalia, Chase pursues him in a space shuttle to the Moon. Chase boards and launches Blackwell's rocket, where he defeats Rex in a final battle. Blackwell destroys the rocket, sending Chase and Rex into freefall towards Earth, and attempts to escape before being accidentally hurled into deep space. Skydiving towards Natalia's prison within the rocket's command module, Chase rescues her by triggering the module's parachute. As they land, Gleeson congratulates Chase for saving Lego City, while Dunby offers him the honor of overseeing Rex's arrest. Chase turns it down, claiming Natalia is more important to him, and they rekindle their relationship.

== Development ==
The development team at TT Fusion had been wanting to create a video game based on the Lego City theme for some time, as did the Lego franchise, but the available technology and the fact that most staff were working on existing IPs limited their ability to create such a game. Prototyping for what would become Lego City Undercover began in 2010, and lasted roughly twelve months. In 2011, Nintendo approached the company and showed them the Wii U hardware, asking whether they would like to develop a game for it. Having already had good experiences with Nintendo with successful ports of their previous titles and liking the platform's specs, the team agreed to work with Nintendo. Developing a game not tied to a movie license gave the team a degree of freedom previously unavailable, while also presenting difficulties with multiple aspects including the story, gameplay and general mechanics of the game. Due to the high compatibility between the team's concept and its prospective hardware, ports to other consoles were not seriously considered, until a few years after the game was released. They were also able to integrate the GamePad functions into the game, making part of Undercover's world. Nintendo generally left the team to develop the game as they pleased, though they received regular updates on the project and would notify them if they saw anything as a problem. Development was split between TT Fusion studio and the Traveller's Tales Knutsford headquarters.

As they did not have a solid idea of what the game would be, the team began with creating a small environment with drivable vehicles and Lego buildings. Various ideas for gameplay were considered, one of which was a city builder similar to the SimCity series, and a fixed camera angle was also quickly abandoned. One of the early gameplay challenges was the combat, which needed to fit into the story context of the lead character being a policeman. Instead of a simple brawling style, the team designed the battle system to allow for defensive gameplay and not involve an equivalent to lethal take-downs. While many critics made comparisons between Lego City Undercover and the Grand Theft Auto series, Goring insisted that the series never played a role of inspiration in the game's development, and the elements instead came from exploring new ideas for a Lego video game and ways of using the Wii U GamePad. Pre-existing open-world video games were never used as inspiration for their overall darker tone. According to lead designer Lee Barber, the goal of the game was to accomplish the opposite, which featured open-world gameplay and exploration but had a positive and upbeat style, which was instructed by the Lego City franchise itself. To follow this pattern, criminals and the crimes committed were not serious ones, and the undercover disguise was implemented so Chase could commit criminal acts but for a morally justified reason.

=== Setting and writing ===
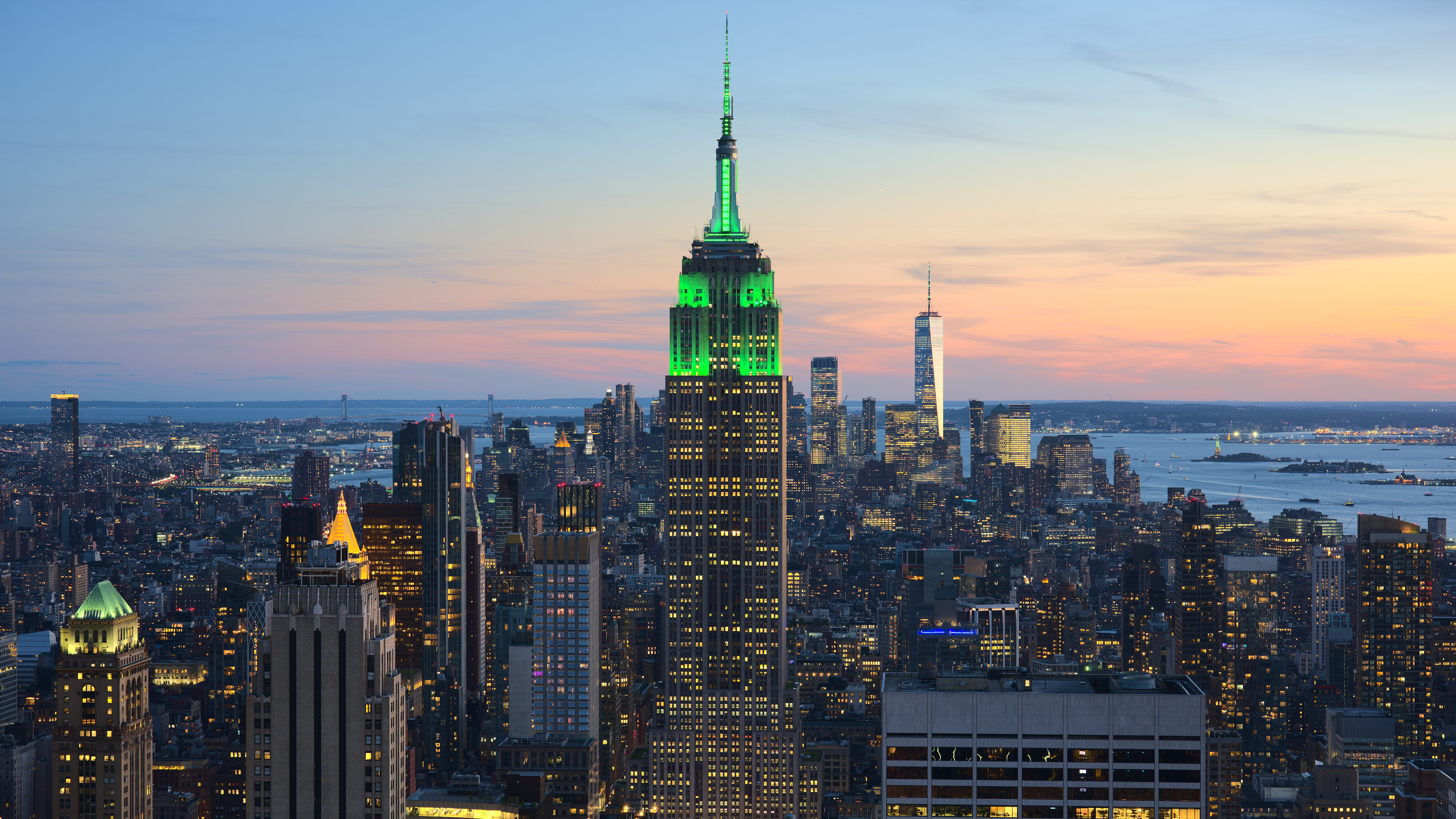
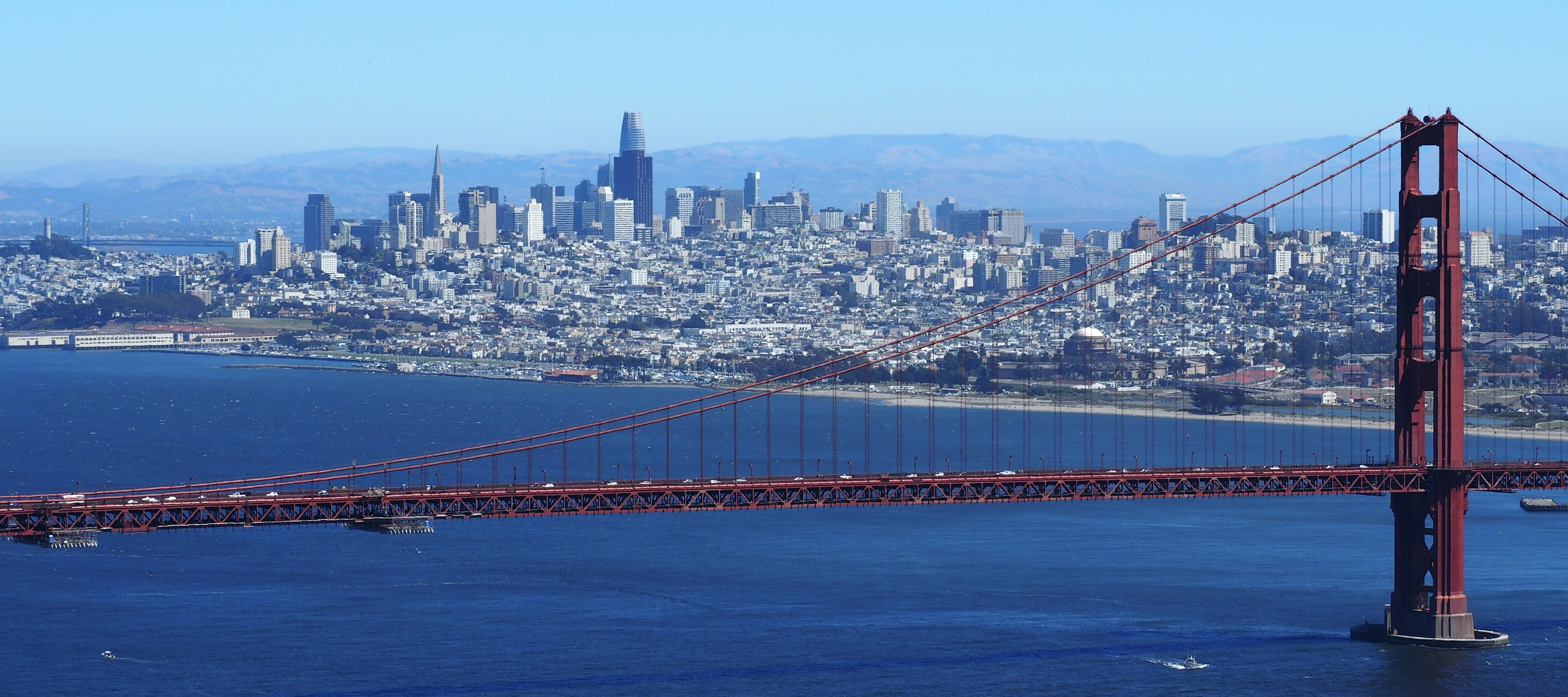
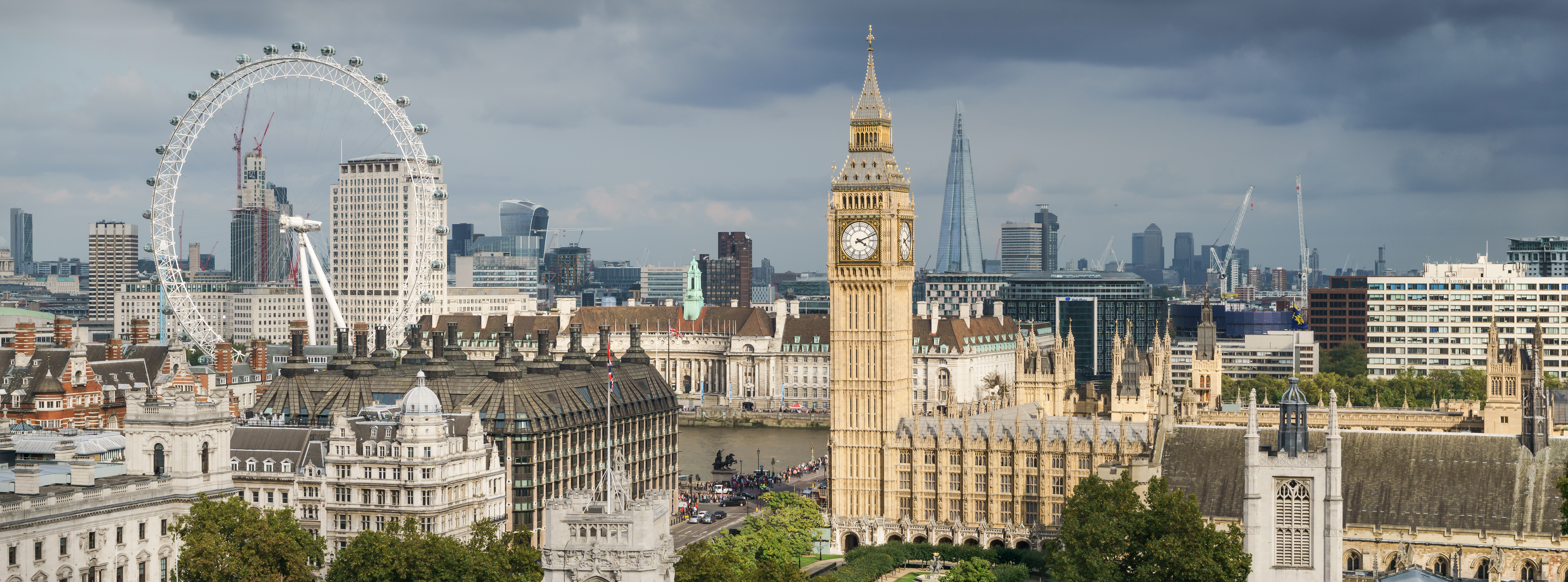
Elements from New York City, San Francisco and London (from top to bottom) were incorporated into the Lego City overworld.

While designing the setting, the team used elements from multiple locations, including New York City, San Francisco and London. The game makes reference to various real-world locations and structures, such as Times Square, the Statue of Liberty, the Golden Gate Bridge, and Alcatraz Federal Penitentiary. The space station on Apollo Island is also heavily inspired by the John F. Kennedy Space Center in Florida. As the game was being developed for a Nintendo console, the team included multiple Nintendo-themed Easter eggs for players to find. The team had to create a new game engine as previous ones were not able to cope with the scale of the environments. The newly made engine was created from scratch, and was made to handle memory, object and vehicle physics, and traffic systems. Executive producer Loz Doyle considered this to be the most difficult part of the development process, as they continuously kept hitting the memory limit of the console.

The team wanted the main character to have depth as they knew both children and adults would play the game. Undercover features full voice acting, which at the time development started was a first for the series, although due to development time, others featuring voice acting were developed and released ahead of it. The team collaborated with voice casting and recording company Side UK. A large voice casting session was held, and several established comedians were requested to come in as the team wanted good delivery for the funny sections of the script. By the time the script writer, former stand-up comedian Graham Goring, was brought on board, a rough outline of the story had been created. His main role was to fill in the gaps and put in as much humor as possible. Goring was given a lot of freedom when it came to the parodies, although the team were regularly consulted on the suitability of the material and a script editor was assigned to check his work. Drawing on his former profession, Goring included a large amount of one-liners and humor intended for both children and adults. Following the template of The Simpsons, the game contains a high number of family-friendly parodies, referencing movies such as The Shawshank Redemption and The Matrix, and TV series such as Starsky & Hutch. The game's story took a while to write, as the team wanted to give it depth. Easter eggs and references to the Super Mario series were included in the game. The song "Walking on Sunshine" by Katrina and the Waves was licensed for use in the opening cutscene.

=== Announcement and release ===
Lego City Undercover was announced during Nintendo's press conference at E3 2011 on 7 June 2011 under the tentative title Lego City Stories. At Nintendo's press conference at E3 2012 on 5 June, the game was revealed to have had a name change to Lego City Undercover. The game's debut trailer was shown during that event, revealing game footage. During the Nintendo Direct held on 13 September 2012, some new trailers detailing the story were shown, along with the announcement that a Chase McCain minifigure would come with the game as a pre-order bonus on North America and Australia while stocks last, and be included in the first copies of the game on Europe. A police high speed chase toy was also released and includes a code for additional in-game content. Nintendo also published the game in Japan on 25 July 2013. At the time of the game's release the Wii U was lacking in major releases, making Lego City Undercover the first major release from Nintendo in 2013; Doyle was very proud of the final product, and declared it to be the best Lego video game as well as the best Wii U game at the time of its release.

On 22 November 2016, Warner Bros. Interactive Entertainment announced that a remaster would be released for Nintendo Switch, PlayStation 4, Windows, and Xbox One in April 2017, which introduced split-screen cooperative support. The Mario Easter eggs from the original game were mostly kept intact in the Nintendo Switch version, with the exception of the Mario Hat being replaced by a generic helicopter.

On 22 December 2020, the Wii U version of Lego City Undercover and its 3DS prequel were removed from the Nintendo eShop.

== Reception ==
Lego City Undercover reviews

Aggregate score
| Aggregator | Score | | | | |
| Aggregator | NS | PC | PS4 | Wii U | Xbox One |
|---|---|---|---|---|---|
| Metacritic | 78/100 | 80/100 | 77/100 | 80/100 | 77/100 |

Review scores
| Publication | Score | | | | |
| Publication | NS | PC | PS4 | Wii U | Xbox One |
|---|---|---|---|---|---|
| 4Players | 76/100 | N/A | 78/100 | 77/100 | 78/100 |
| Destructoid | N/A | N/A | N/A | 7/10 | N/A |
| Edge | N/A | N/A | N/A | 5/10 | N/A |
| Electronic Gaming Monthly | N/A | N/A | N/A | 8/10 | N/A |
| Eurogamer | N/A | N/A | N/A | 9/10 | N/A |
| Game Informer | N/A | N/A | N/A | 8.50/10 | N/A |
| GameRevolution | N/A | N/A | N/A | 4.5/5 | N/A |
| GameSpot | N/A | N/A | N/A | 8.0/10 | N/A |
| GamesRadar+ | N/A | N/A | N/A | 4/5 | N/A |
| GameStar | N/A | 85/100 | N/A | N/A | N/A |
| Hardcore Gamer | N/A | N/A | 3.5/5 | N/A | N/A |
| IGN | 8/10 | 8/10 | 8/10 | 8.0/10 | N/A |
| Nintendo Life | 6/10 | N/A | N/A | 8/10 | N/A |
| Pocket Gamer | 4/5 | N/A | N/A | N/A | N/A |
| Polygon | N/A | N/A | N/A | 7/10 | N/A |
| Push Square | N/A | N/A | 6/10 | N/A | N/A |
| The Guardian | N/A | N/A | N/A | 4/5 | N/A |

=== Critical reception ===
The Wii U version of the game received a score of 80/100 on the review aggregator website Metacritic, indicating "generally favorable reviews". When re-released to other consoles and PC, all new versions received a score ranging from 77 to 80 on the site.

==== Wii U version ====
Many critics compare the game and its mechanics positively to that of the Grand Theft Auto series, albeit in a more family-friendly and playful manner. Another common positive was the use of popular culture references that also helped broaden the appeal to a larger audience, including references to The Shawshank Redemption, Goodfellas, and the Mario franchise among others. In a negative review by Edge, the staff believed that Lego City Undercover lacked originality with its repetitive urban and city environments with disassociated references to popular culture, although they felt it was slightly justified without its use of pre-existing source material.

Gameplay generally received mixed opinions. Many critics found the combat mechanics to be lackluster, but positively received its physical wit. Critics enjoyed the implication of disguises as a gameplay mechanic, with George noting how it helped give variety to the Lego series' repetitive formula, but some negatively received how the game often required constantly swapping between them with minimal variance. Carsillo called the Wii U GamePad and its use in the game "an ingenious little plot device", and Cork admitted he "completely fell for the gimmick". However, Edge and Oertel felt that the GamePad was used too minimally and therefore not meaningful, with Bischoff calling its use "forced." Carsillo cited several technical issues as the main fault of the game, such as slow loading times, poor frame rate, and bad camera control. Destructoid believed the general gameplay of Lego City Undercover was disappointing as it retained a similar format found in other Lego games, but did not consider the gameplay itself to be a negative. George and Polygon's Justin McElroy expressed similar negative feelings about the game's loading time and frame rate. Vehicles were received positively, but some cited poor handling.

Electronic Gaming Monthly's Ray Carsillo considered the game's original theme to be a positive, as it stood out against other Lego games and had the potential for widespread appeal, and Eurogamer reviewer Tom Bramwell believed this was accomplished effectively. GameSpot's Kevin VanOrd also noted positively how the game's wit extended beyond references to other media, including its own slew of written and visual gags. Richard George of IGN appreciated how the story had a "strong sense of progression throughout the game". The characters and voice acting were received positively, and George noted how the character's and their relationships with each other matched a police drama with family-friendly slapstick and caricatures. Writing for GameRevolution, Daniel Bischoff enjoyed the comedic writing and it helped him remember the experience beyond its gameplay. The Guardian positively compared the games writing style and cutscenes to the works of Zucker, Abrahams and Zucker, pointing out its continuous use of cliches, sketches, and gags.

James Stephanie Sterling of Destructoid considered the environment to be dynamic, which many other critics considered to be the reason why the overworld was fun to continuously explore and drive around. Jeff Cork, writing for Game Informer, enjoyed the level of detail in the environment and found it enjoyable driving through it without an objective. 4Players reviewer Mathias Oertel cited the worldbuilding as a reason that made Lego City Undercover "irresistible". Destructoid called the overworld a "sprawling world of color and distraction". Critics noted how objects in the distance would pop into view abruptly, and Edge felt that while it was not a major flaw, they felt disappointed that the "first major exclusive in 2013" for the Wii U does not run smoothly. Sterling saw the collectibles as a reason to remain invested in the game after completing the story, but Oertel contrarily referred to the overworld secrets as "irrelevant". Bischoff appreciated that the collectibles felt like an addition rather a necessity, unlike previous games.

==== Other versions ====
Critics praised the addition of cooperative multiplayer to the other versions, although GameStar's Tobias Veltin cited the lack of online play as a negative. IGN reviewer Tristan Oglivie derided the multiplayer for the lack of new content beyond second-player support; Liam Croft of Push Square expressed similar opinions but appreciated the feature being included. Oertel rated all new versions positively, but gave a lower score to the Nintendo Switch version, citing noticeable frame drops that were not as present in the Wii U version. Oglivie and Pocket Gamer's Emily Sowden also noted the frame rate decrease of the Nintendo Switch when being used as a portable, but Oglvie praised the higher frame rate of the other versions. Veltin awarded the PC version the website's "Gold Award" for having a high score, praising the game's presentation, design, and story, but criticized the lack of mouse support. Reviewing the PS4 version, Sam Spyrison of Hardcore Gamer declared the game to be high quality and an improvement over past Lego titles, but believed that the game lacked gameplay that an older audience would find appealing. Oglivie considered the removal of the Wii U GamePad unimpactful, noting its absence to be more convenient but overall less enjoyable.

=== Sales ===
In the UK, the game debuted at number 12 in the all-formats chart, and debuted at number 8 in the individual-format chart and at number 1 in the Wii U chart. In Japan, the game sold more than 18,000 copies during its first week, entering all the charts at number 9. By 31 December 2022, the Wii U version had sold 1.15 million units worldwide.
