= The Barbie Diaries =

2006 motion capture film

- DVD cover
- Directed by: Eric Fogel
- Written by: Elise Allen; Laura McCreary
- Produced by: Kallan Kagan
- Starring: Kelly Sheridan; Skye Sweetnam; Sarah Edmondson; Venus Terzo; Matt Hill; Chiara Zanni; Andrew Francis; Maryke Hendrikse; Anna Cummer
- Voice director: Kallan Kagan
- Executive producer: Rob Hudnut
- Edited by: Bryan Shelton
- Music by: Russ DeSalvo; Peter Schwartz
- Production companies: Curious Pictures; Mattel
- Distributed by: North America; Lionsgate Home Entertainment; Overseas; Universal Pictures Video; UK and Ireland; Right Entertainment
- Release dates: April 30, 2006 (Nickelodeon); May 9, 2006 (DVD)
- Running time: 70 minutes
- Country: United States
- Language: English

The Barbie Diaries is a 2006 animated motion capture teen drama film directed by Eric Fogel and written by Elise Allen and Laura McCreary which premiered on Nickelodeon and then on DVD.

The eighth entry in the Barbie film series, it features Kelly Sheridan as the talking vocal provider for Barbie and Skye Sweetnam as her singing vocals. The only Barbie film produced by Curious Pictures and thus the only film in the first decade of the Barbie film franchise not to be produced by Mainframe Entertainment (currently Mainframe Studios), this is also the last Barbie film to be originally distributed by Lionsgate in the United States and Canada, as Universal Studios (now Universal Pictures), who already released the films overseas with international distributor Entertainment Rights, was set to take over the home video distribution rights from the next film, Barbie in the 12 Dancing Princesses.

== Plot ==
In this film, Barbie is portrayed as a typical American teenager who is a sophomore in high school who encounters the problems that real-life teens often encounter: making new friends, dating, gossip and getting involved in school activities. She always gets beaten in everything by Raquelle, a snobby girl who used to be her best friend in fifth grade. On the first day of school, she attempts to become anchorwoman for the school TV station but Raquelle beats her to it. Instead, she becomes Raquelle's personal assistant, buying her drinks and doing her work.

When Raquelle dumps her boyfriend Todd, on whom Barbie has a crush, he and Barbie begin hanging out together and soon become a couple. Todd asks Barbie to the Fall Formal. Thrilled, Barbie, as well as her best friends Tia and Courtney, rush to buy a dress when they discover that Raquelle and Todd are together again. The mysterious woman at the counter, whose name is Stephanie, gives them advice and offers them some charm bracelets for free. Barbie's happens to come with a diary which she writes her hopes in.

Soon after, what she wrote starts to mysteriously come true. Someone leaves her love notes and her band, Charmz, gets a gig at the school dance that Barbie was previously invited to. Next, Barbie decides to do a piece on popular kids and "What Makes Them Popular." She soon starts to neglect her friends and the story is quite mean. She even skips Tia's class-president election to hang out with Reagan and Dawn, Raquelle's friends. She starts skipping band practice and spends hours talking to them on the phone and hanging out with them. Barbie realizes that her hopes written in the diary came true and rushes to the mall to ask Stephanie about it. To her shock, it is revealed that the woman never worked there and apparently does not exist.

Tia and Courtney discover that it is Kevin who has been leaving Barbie the love notes, not Todd. They pressure him to tell her, but he refuses. Dawn and Reagan find out that Barbie only befriended them because of her story and stop hanging out with her. They tell Raquelle. Soon, Raquelle steals Barbie's magic bracelet, leaving her unable to use the diary anymore. Tia and Courtney watch footage of the story, and they discover that Barbie has told them a secret about Tia. They confront her and let her know that they no longer want to be friends with her. The night of the story, Barbie apologizes to her friends and chooses to instead showcase Kevin's film clips depicting a paperclip chain attacking his eBook. Out of shame, Barbie refuses to go to the dance. On the night of the dance, her friends arrive and tell her that she has to perform with them, giving her the dress that they put on hold for her at the mall.

Still worried as she has no bracelet, Kevin takes one of his guitar strings and loops it around her wrist. Barbie points out that it is a "stupid piece of bent metal" until she realizes that is what her bracelet was. The girls rock the concert with Courtney finally able to do a drum stick maneuver that she couldn't do before. While dancing with Todd she asks him about the notes in her locker but he denies knowing about any notes. Confused, Barbie thinks back to other people who were in the places the notes had said. Realizing that it was Kevin all along, Barbie leaves in the middle of the dance and goes over to Kevin. Kevin gives her back the charm bracelet that he found on the ground. She apologizes for never realizing, but points out that the bizarre rhyming in the notes was a giveaway. The two dance together and become a couple. At the end, Barbie and Kevin watch a movie while eating ziti as Kevin asked.

== Cast ==
- Kelly Sheridan as Barbie Roberts
  - Skye Sweetnam as Barbie Roberts (singing voice)
- Sarah Edmondson as Courtney, a Japanese-American girl and one of Barbie's friends.
- Venus Terzo as Tia, an African-American girl and one of Barbie's friends.
- Matt Hill as Kevin, a nerd, and Barbie's friend and later her boyfriend.
- Chiara Zanni as Raquelle, a mean girl and Barbie's rival.
- Maryke Hendrikse as Reagan, Raquelle's sidekick.
- Anna Cummer as Dawn, an Asian girl, and Raquelle's sidekick.
- Andrew Francis as Todd, a popular boy, Barbie's crush, and Raquelle's boyfriend.
- Heather Doerksen as Stephanie, a mysterious woman who works at the shop counter.

== Soundtrack ==
The Barbie Diaries (Movie Soundtrack)

Soundtrack album by Various artists
- Released: May 9, 2006
- Genre: Pop rock
- Label: Capitol

The film's eponymous soundtrack album was released on the same date as the film itself. Containing 5 songs and excluding the film's theme song, "This Is Me", it is sold along with the DVD on Walmart. The songs "Girl Most Likely To" and "Real Life" were sung by different artists for the album instead of Skye Sweetnam whose versions were featured in the film.

=== Track list ===
No.	Title	Writer(s)	Length
1.	"Invisible" (performed by Kesha)	Martin Briley and Chris Pelcer	3:16
2.	"Girl Most Likely To" (performed by Dana Calitri)	Nina Ossoff, Kathy Sommer and Dana Calitri	3:53
3.	"Feels Like Love" (performed by Tabitha Fair)	Martin Briley, Russ DeSalvo and Dana Calitri	3:57
4.	"Real Life" (performed by Lucy Woodward)	Martin Briley, Russ DeSalvo and Dana Calitri	3:31
5.	"Fate Finds a Way" (performed by Elanya)	Michael Sakolir	3:27

=== This Is Me ===
"This Is Me"

Song by Skye Sweetnam
- Released: 2006
- Genre: Pop punk
- Length: 3:42
- Label: Capitol
- Songwriters: Amy Powers; Michèle Vice-Maslin; Dorian Cheah
- Producer: Dorian Cheah

"This Is Me" is a pop punk song and the film's opening track sung by Skye Sweetnam, written by Dorian Cheah, Amy Powers and Michèle Vice-Maslin and distributed by Capitol Records. (Note: For additional work user may have to select 'Search again' and then 'Enter a title:' &/or 'Performer:') Played during the film's opening credits, its accompanying music video which was included as a bonus feature in film's DVD release features the opening credits scenes depicting Barbie, Tia and Courtney playing their instruments and performing interwoven with footages of Skye Sweetnam during her recording sessions for the song and her live stage concert performances.

=== Other songs ===
- "This Is Me" (performed by Skye Sweetnam)
- "Girl Most Likely To" (movie version) (performed by Skye Sweetnam)
- "Real Life" (end credits) (performed by Skye Sweetnam)
- "Note to Self" (performed by Skye Sweetnam)
- "Where You Belong" (performed by Huckapoo) (originally from the soundtrack of the Disney Channel Original Series That's So Raven)
- "I Don't Wanna Sleep" (performed by Deanna DellaCioppa)

== Promotion and Charmz ==
To promote the release of the film, Mattel teamed up with Australian record label, Shock Records, to put together a local 4-piece girl band under the name Charmz in the likeness of Barbie's eponymous in-film band through a singing contest for girls aged 8 to 14.

The aspiring girls of around 500 entrants had to send in a video of themselves singing of which 4 would plucked out from. The 4 plucked out were Gianna Dalla-Vecchia, Paris Maggs, Lauren Stowe (all aged 13 at the time) and 14-year-old Shannon Cordes.

The 4 winners, now under the Charmz name, were taken to a recording studio in Sydney, where they were mentored by former Australian Idol contestant, Ricki-Lee Coulter. Their self-titled album was released on 28 October 2006. It contains cover versions of tracks by Coulter, Robbie Williams, Bananarama, Gwen Stefani, The Mamas and the Papas and Hilary and Haylie Duff.

The rendition of "This Is Me" by Charmz was issued ahead of the album on 31 July 2006, which peaked at No. 57 on the ARIA singles chart.

=== Discography ===
- Charmz (28 October 2006) – Shock/Mattel
- "This Is Me" (31 July 2006) – Shock/Mattel (SPIKE010)

== See also ==
- List of Barbie films
