= L&YR Class 32 =

British steam locomotive class (1908–1929)

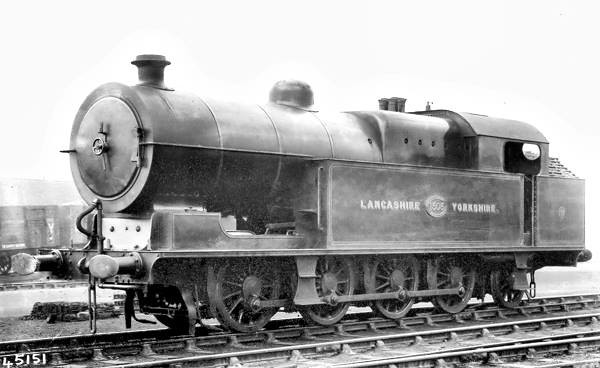
Type and origin
- Power type: Steam
- Designer: G. Hughes
- Builder: Horwich Works
- Order number: Lot 59
- Serial number: 1004–1008
- Build date: 1908
- Total produced: 5
Specifications
- Configuration
  - Whyte: 0-8-2T
  - UIC: D1′ n2tG
- Gauge: 4 ft 8 1/2 in (1,435 mm)
- Driver dia.: 4 ft 6 in (1.372 m)
- Trailing dia.: 3 ft 8 in (1.118 m)
- Loco weight: 84.00 long tons (85.35 t)
- Fuel type: Coal
- Fuel capacity: 3.00 long tons (3.05 t)
- Water cap.: 2,000 imp gal (9,100 L; 2,400 US gal)
- Boiler pressure: 180 lbf/in^{2} (1.24 MPa)
- Heating surface: 2,198 sq ft (204.2 m^{2})
- Cylinders: Two, inside
- Cylinder size: 21 1/2 in × 26 in (546 mm × 660 mm)
- Valve gear: Joy
- Train brakes: Vacuum
Performance figures
- Tractive effort: 34,052 lbf (151.5 kN)
Career
- Operators: Lancashire and Yorkshire Railway; → London, Midland and Scottish Railway
- Class: L&YR: 32
- Power class: LMS: 6F
- Numbers: L&YR 1501–11505; LMS: 11800–11804
- Nicknames: Little Egberts
- Withdrawn: 1927–1929
- Disposition: All scrapped

The Lancashire and Yorkshire Railway Class 32 was a small class of 0-8-2T steam locomotives, intended for heavy shunting and banking duties.

== Overview ==
After the introduction of Henry Ivatt's Class L1 in 1903, several UK railway companies designed extremely large tank engines with eight- or even ten-coupled driving wheels (Note: Holden's 0-10-0T Decapod for the Great Eastern Railway) and few carrying axles to give the drivers the highest possible adhesive weight. Although their maximum speed was limited without a pilot truck they were as large as the loading gauge and axle load restrictions allowed, thus allowing a high tractive effort.

On some lines this was used for accelerating suburban passenger services to compete with new electric railways, while on others they were used as heavy shunters to cope with the increasing weight of freight trains. These were particularly needed with the introduction of hump shunting. Although the tank engine layout restricted their coal and water capacity (their large boilers left little space for side tanks), all of their duties were relatively short ranged and thus did not require long endurance.

== Hughes' locomotives ==
In 1908, Hughes produced this type of locomotive for the Lancashire and Yorkshire. These tank engines were based on the previous Aspinall Class 30 0-8-0 tender engines, although their similarities were often over-emphasised. Their coupled wheelbase was extended by 2 ft (0.61 m) to 24 feet 6 inches (7.47 m), requiring the two centre drivers to be flangeless with widened tyre treads to allow them to negotiate tight curves within a marshalling yard. This was more successful than similar flangeless drivers had been with Hoy's Class 26 2-6-2Ts, where the centre drivers tended to drop between the rails if tracks were not well maintained. The two inside cylinders were 21 1/2 by 26 inches (546 mm × 660 mm), the largest of any non-compound engine in Britain.

== Boiler design ==
The type 'L' boiler was substantially different from any other class. It was 5 ft 9.5 in (1.765 m) in diameter (6 ft 1 in (1.85 m) over the outer wrapper), 1 ft (0.30 m) larger than the 'J' boiler of previous engines. A Belpaire firebox and Ramsbottom safety valves were used. A similar boiler was fitted to Hughes' 1910 large-boilered Class 9, a development of the Class 30. Although this was another feature said to be shared with the 0-8-0s, they were actually longer than the L boiler. The L boiler was unique to the Class 32, although they were made on the same flanging plates as Hughes' Dreadnought class. This nonstandard boiler would lead to the class' early withdrawal when they needed replacement after 20 years.

Superheating was an innovation at this time and not yet firmly established, mostly from difficulties in providing adequate cylinder lubrication. Hughes was an advocate of superheating and used it when rebuilding the 7 ft 3 in (2,210 mm) Class 4 express 4-4-0s, fitting Schmidt superheaters and piston valves along with Walschaerts valve gear. Despite this, he recognised that an intermittently worked shunting engine like the Class 32 would not allow the superheater elements to reach optimum working temperature, thus retaining a saturated boiler.

Other fittings included vacuum brakes and oval buffers, to avoid locking when rounding tight curves with their long overhang.

== Service ==
=== Lancashire & Yorkshire ===
All five engines were ordered from Horwich Works in one batch as Lot 59 on 28 November 1907 and delivered between March and April 1908. They carried the full 'passenger' livery of the L&YR in black with single red and double white lining.

Their original purpose was for the hump shunting yards at Aintree. However, problems with the spring hangers fouling the electric third rail system on the Liverpool to Ormskirk lines between the engine shed and the sidings led to their transfer from this service. Nos. 1501 and 1502 were then allocated to Accrington for working the 1 in 38 Baxenden bank.

1505 was first allocated to Agecroft for the Manchester Ship Canal sidings at New Barnes junction. Nos. 1503 and 1504 were later transferred here, upon which 1505 joined the other engines at Accrington as a spare.

The class were nicknamed Egberts or Little Egberts after a troupe of circus elephants, although there is no obvious record of said troupe. Another explanation could be The Egbert Brothers, a music hall double act of this time, known for their routine 'The Happy Dustmen'.

List of locomotives
L&YR Nº	Works Nº	Service Date	Allocation	LMS Nº	Withdrawn
1501	1004	31 March 1908	Accrington	11800	August 1925
1502	1005	18 March 1908	Accrington	11801	June 1927
1503	1006	27 March 1908	Agecroft	11802	June 1926
1504	1007	10 April 1908	Agecroft	11803	October 1929
1505	1008	27 April 1908	Agecroft, later Accrington	11804	February 1927

=== LMS ===
Despite the urgency for their building, there appears to have been little need for the class in service, especially in their later years. Soon after the Grouping in 1923, LMS policy for weeding out non-standard types made the class superfluous. Their boiler's eventual need for replacement, and their unique design, led to the whole class' withdrawal between 1927 and 1929. All were allocated LMS numbers, but only 1504 was repainted in LMS black livery with its new number of 11803 painted on and losing its original cast numberplate.
