= L&YR Class 2 (Aspinall) =

British steam locomotive class (1888–1935)

Type and origin
- Power type: Steam
- Designer: John Aspinall
- Builder: Beyer, Peacock and Company
- Build date: 1888-1889
- Total produced: 30
Specifications
- Configuration
  - Whyte: 4-4-0
- Gauge: 4 ft 8 1/2 in (1,435 mm)
- Leading dia.: 3 ft 0 1/2 in (0.927 m)
- Driver dia.: 6 ft 0 in (1.829 m)
- Length: 24 ft 7 1/2 in (7.506 m)
- Adhesive weight: 29.50 long tons (29.97 t)
- Loco weight: 43.25 long tons (43.94 t); 44.6 long tons (45.3 t)
- Fuel type: Coal
- Boiler pressure: 160 psi (1.10 MPa); 180 psi (1.24 MPa) (Note: Information relates to rebuilt locomotives)
- Cylinders: 2
- Cylinder size: 18 in × 26 in (457 mm × 660 mm)
- Valve gear: Joy
Performance figures
- Tractive effort: 15,910 lbf (70.8 kN); 17,900 lbf (79.6 kN)
Career
- Operators: L&YR, LMS
- Power class: LMS 1P
- Nicknames: Peacocks
- Withdrawn: 1901, 1930-1935
- Disposition: All scrapped
- Details as built except where stated

The L&YR Class 2 (Aspinall) was a class of 4-4-0 steam locomotives of the Lancashire and Yorkshire Railway.

== Design and construction ==
When Aspinall joined the L&YR in 1886 he was able to demonstrate to board needed 1,114 locomotives to operate the required 22¼ million annual mileage and was thus 151 short. (Note: Based on LNWR average annual engine mileage of 19,500) (Note: The company was operating a commonplace one team per engine policy at that time to avoid issues of split responsibility)

For express passenger engines Aspinall chose to stick with developing the L&YR Barton Wright 4-4-0 with 6 feet 0 inches (1.83 m) driving wheels. To cope with the locomotive shortage and new route to Liverpool the L&YR ordered a further batch of 16 from Vulcan Foundry who had built the most recent order for 20. Quoted at £1,830 they were delivered in 1887 and incorporated longer wheelbase, increased boiler pressure, larger cylinders and bogie wheels of just over 3 ft.

Aspinall had inspirations to increase the size of the driving wheels to with the objective achieve to speed advantages demonstrated by the GNR Stirling 4-2-2 and the LY&R Ramsbottom 2-4-0s. These would come with the Aspinall 7ft 3in 4-4-0s in 1891 as L&YR's own new Horwich Works came into operation. In the interim a batch of 30 with 6 ft driving wheels were ordered from Beyer Peacock. The L&YR had strong connections to Beyer Peacock at the time with John Ramsbottom being a both a consultant on the new Horwich Works and a director of Beyer Peacock. The L&YR was able to negotiate a priced fixed at £1,990 for two years and to delay initial deliveries which both helped finances and enabled design refinements to the boiler and motion.

The Beyer Locomotives the L&YR standardized Joy valve gear, and equipped with the swing-link bogie. (Note: Lane (2010), pp. 45, 50 implies by omission the 1887 Vulcan Foundry 4-4-0 batch did not have swing link bogies. Aspinall would have been familiar with swing link bogies introduced by Inchicore with the GS&WR Class 2) Other features such as 3 feet 0 1/2 inch (0.927 m) bogie wheels, 8 feet 11 inches (2.718 m) coupled wheelbase 160 psi boiler were the same as the last batch from Vulcan Foundry.

=== Rebuilds and modifications ===
The supplied built-up chimneys were replaced with the LY&R standard Horwich parallel type by 1900. Several had their boiler pressure increased to 180 psi in the early 1900s but in all but three cases it was reduced back to 160 psi by the grouping. Numbers 982, 999 and 1003 were rebuilt by George Hughes between 1910 and 1915 with saturated Belpaire firebox. Some engines feature extended smokeboxs on saturated boilers. After World War I there was tendency to switch tenders with those of other classes and tender coal rails were seemingly randomly fitted although there does appear to be some logic pertaining to the particular duties an individual engine was expected to perform.

== Service ==
Marshall notes the class were popular throughout their network.

The class were initially based mainly in Lancashire mainly working semi-fast passenger trains from Manchester, Colne, Liverpool, Southport, Blackpool and Bradford. Bradford based engines were later displaced by Apsinalls 7ft 3in 4-4-0s

29 passed to the London, Midland and Scottish Railway at the grouping in 1923.

== Numbering ==
L&YR and LMS numbering.
L&YR nos.	LMS nos.	Notes
922, 924	10100-10101	The two survivors from the last Vulcan Foundry batch which had many similarities to the Beyer Peacock batch and were numbered at the start of this sequence by the LMS.
978-986	10102-10110	
988-1007	10111-10130	The sequence gap is due to the loss of 987 in the Tormorden crash

== Withdrawal ==
The LMS, which soon moved to a Midland Derby bias, adopted a "scrap and build" as opposed to a "rebuild" engine policy and the Fowler 2P 4-4-0 being was as the LMS standard light passenger engine. Withdrawals began in 1930 and the last locomotive was withdrawn in 1935. None have been preserved.

== Incidents ==
No 987 was scrapped following a collision at Todmorden on 4 November 1901. No 987 was hauling a Manchester to York passenger train composed of only three bogie coaches due to earlier operational problems. The train mistakenly routed onto the Burnley branch in dense fog conditions where it collided with pilot engine No. 809 pushing it 640 yards (590 m) along on an uphill gradient. Both engines were badly damaged; all four locomotive crew were injured, two severely; and four passengers were also slightly injured.

== Bibliography ==
- Bulleid, H.A.V. (1967). The Aspinall Era. Ian Allan Ltd.
- Casserley, H.C.; Johnston, S.W. (1966). Locomotives at the Grouping, no.3, LMS. Ian Allan.
- Druitt, E. (1901). "Lancashire and Yorkshire Railway" (PDF). Board of Trade. Archived (PDF) from the original on 23 August 2019.
- Lane, Barry C. (2010). Lancashire & Yorkshire Railway Locomotives. Pendragon. ISBN 9781899816170.
- Marshall, John (1970). The Lancashire & Yorkshire Railway, volume 2. Newton Abbot: David & Charles. ISBN 0-7153-4906-6.
- Marshall, John (1972). The Lancashire & Yorkshire Railway, volume 3. Newton Abbot: David & Charles. ISBN 0-7153-5320-9.
- Mason, Eric (1953). The Lancashire and Yorkshire. Railways before the grouping. Vol. 3. London: Ian Allan.
- Whitehouse, Patrick; Thomas, David St John (1987). LMS 150. Newton Abbot: David & Charles.
