= L&YR Barton Wright 4-4-0 =

British steam locomotive class (1880–1930)

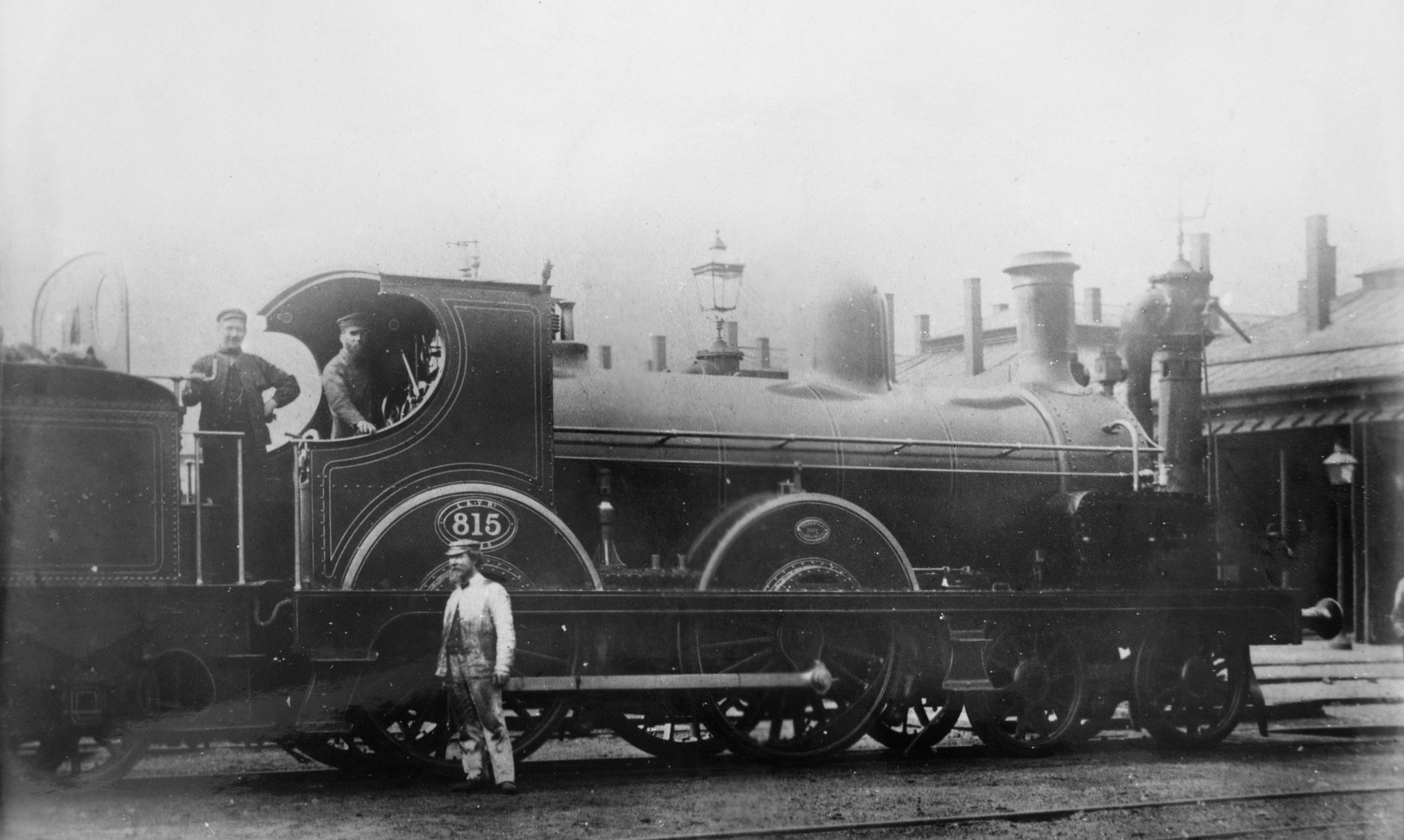
- L&YR 815 built by Neilson in 1883
Type and origin
- Power type: Steam
- Designer: William Barton Wright
- Builder: Sharp Stewart; Kitson; Neilson; Vulcan Foundry
- Build date: 1880–1887
- Total produced: 110 (Note: Including Vulcan Foundry ordered by Aspinall but excluding Beyer Peacock and later)
Specifications
- Configuration
  - Whyte: 4-4-0
- Gauge: 4 ft 8 1/2 in (1,435 mm) standard gauge
- Leading dia.: 3 feet 7 3/4 inches (1.111 m)
- Driver dia.: 6 feet 0 inches (1.83 m)
- Loco weight: 41 long tons 15 cwt 2 qr (93,580 lb or 42.45 t)
- Boiler pressure: 140 psi (0.97 MPa)
Performance figures
- Tractive effort: 13,160 lbf (58.5 kN) (Note: Figure applies to later Sharp Stewart Locomotives)
Career
- Withdrawn: 1930 (Note: Only two survived past 1914)

The Lancashire and Yorkshire Railway (L&YR) Barton Wright 4-4-0 was four-coupled eight-wheeled bogie express engine which entered service in 1880.

The L&YR Class 2 was similar and introduced for the Lancashire and Yorkshire Railway in 1885. Both classes were designed by William Barton Wright.

== Design and construction ==
Locomotive superintendent William Barton Wright ordered the first eight of the type in 1879 from Sharp, Stewart and Company for the Hellifield−Chatburn line.

Sharp Stewart supplied a further 16 in 1881 with Neilson and Company supplying 20 in 1883 and 10 in 1884, the latter having Joy valve gears. The final batches Barton Wright batches went back to link motion: 20 from Kitson and Company in 1885 and 20 from Vulcan Foundry up to 1886. Following Barton Wright's resignation and John Aspinall's appointment, the final 16 ordered from Vulcan Foundry delivered in 1887 had 4 in (10 cm) longer coupled wheelbases, Timmis springs on the eight axles, and bogie wheels reduced to 3 feet 0 inches (0.91 m) to permit straight main frames and a horizontal grate.

Thirty-six L&YR Class 2 locomotives were produced. Subsequent developments based on the design were the Aspinall L&YR Class 2, of which 30 were ordered from Beyer, Peacock and Company with Joy valve gears and 160 psi (1,100 kPa) boilers, as well as other variations, and the L&YR Class 3 with 7 feet 3 inches (2.21 m) driving wheels.

== Service ==
The 6 feet 0 inches (1.83 m) driving wheels were suited to more challenging routes but on a non arduous route the Ramsbottom 2-4-0s could be faster. Smaller tenders were initially necessary until bigger turntables were installed.

Most were withdrawn in the early 1900s with only two, Nos. 922 and 924 going past 1914 to be classified Class 2 by Hughes in 1919. These passed through amalgamation into the LNWR at the grouping in 1923, finally becoming London, Midland and Scottish Railway (LMS) Nos. 10100 and 10101 respectively before withdrawal in November 1930.

== 1887 Royal Jubilee Exhibition ==
One of the final Vulcan Foundry batch with 3 ft bogie wheels batch was exhibited at the Royal Jubilee Exhibition, Manchester 1887.

== Bibliography ==
- Bulleid, H.A.V. (1967). The Aspinall Era. Ian Allan Ltd.
- Marshall, John (1972). The Lancashire & Yorkshire Railway, volume 3. Newton Abbot: David & Charles. ISBN 0-7153-5320-9.
