= Class 32 =

Class 32 or 32 class may refer to:

- BHP Newcastle 32 class, Australian diesel-electric locomotive
- L&YR Class 32, British 0-8-2T steam locomotive
- New South Wales 32 class locomotive, Australian 4-6-0 steam locomotive
- South African Class 32-000, South African diesel-electric locomotive introduced in 1959
- South African Class 32-200, South African diesel-electric locomotive introduced in 1966
