= D19 =

D19 may refer to:

== Ships ==
- Brazilian destroyer escort Bauru (D19), a Cannon-class destroyer escort of the Brazilian Navy
- HMS Glamorgan (D19), a County-class destroyer of the Royal Navy
- HMS Malcolm (D19), a Admiralty type destroyer of the Royal Navy
- HMS Queen (D19), a Ruler-class escort carrier of the Royal Navy
- HMS Queenborough (D19), a Q-class destroyer of the Royal Navy

== Other uses ==
- D-19 (Michigan county highway)
- D-19 launch system for Soviet and later Russian R-39 missiles
- Allis-Chalmers D19, an American tractor
- Dewoitine D.19, a French fighter aircraft
- GSR Class D19, an Irish steam locomotive
- Leapmotor D19, an electric car
- LNER Class D19, an English steam locomotive class
