= GS&WR 0-6-4T =

Irish rail locomotive type

Great Southern & Western Railway 0-6-4T
Type and origin
- Power type: Steam
- Designer: Alexander McDonnell
- Builder: Inchicore Works
- Build date: 1876–1880
- Total produced: 6
Specifications
- Configuration
  - Whyte: 0-6-4T
- Gauge: 5 ft 3 in (1,600 mm)
- Driver dia.: 4 ft 6 1/2 in (1.384 m)
- Axle load: 12 long tons 13 cwt (28,300 lb or 12.9 t)
- Loco weight: 51 long tons 6 cwt (114,900 lb or 52.1 t)
- Fuel type: Coal
- Fuel capacity: 2 long tons 10 cwt (5,600 lb or 2.5 t)
- Water cap.: 2,540 imp gal (11,500 L; 3,050 US gal)
- Boiler pressure: 150 psi (1.03 MPa)
- Heating surface
  - Firebox: 103.5 sq ft (9.62 m^{2})
  - Tubes: 900 sq ft (84 m^{2})
- Cylinders: Two, inside
- Cylinder size: 18 in × 24 in (457 mm × 610 mm)
Performance figures
- Tractive effort: 18,200 lbf (80.96 kN)
Career
- Operators: GS&WR → GSR
- Class: 203
- Numbers: 201–202, 203–206
- Withdrawn: 1928, 1940
- Disposition: All scrapped
- Details refer to No. 203 as built.

The (GS&WR) 0-6-4T were a set of 6 locomotives of two variants of the 0-6-4T arrangement designed by Alexander McDonnell. When introduced in 1876 it was the first use of a 0-6-4 configuration in the British Isles. The final four locomotives were to be designated GS&WR Class 203.

== Design ==
The design utilised many existing components of the existing 0-6-0T and 0-4-4T designs. 18x24in cylinders were already being retrofitted to existing goods engines to cope with existing traffic needs. The first two locomotives, Nos. 201 and 202, were built as back tanks holding water above the rear bogie and were particularly noted for adhesion problems with little weight on the front driving wheels. The subsequent batch of four in 1880 were built with side tanks and being four tons heavier gave some improvement in adhesion.

== Service ==
Experience with the 0-6-4T tanks was unusually disappointing for a McDonnel design. Experience at Cork has shown they were extremely prone to slipping while the long frames and wheelbase were problematic in the tight curves of marshalling sidings; with the powerful thrust of the large cylinders not being able to be utilised. Ivatt and Aspinall were to address these issues in a 0-6-0T design that was to become known as the GS&WR Class 201.

== Withdrawals ==
The first two, Nos. 201 and 202, were withdrawn relatively early and their numbers reallocated to a pair of members of GS&WR Class 201 built in 1895 some eight years after the first four. (Note: On withdrawal in 1895 these locomotives saw departmental use having names in place of their numbers) No. 204 was rebuilt as a 0-6-0T in 1914. No. 205 and 206 were withdrawn in 1928 with No 203 lasting until 1940.
