= GS&WR McDonnell 2-4-0 =

Irish 1860s passenger locomotive types

Type and origin
- Power type: Steam
- Designer: Alexander McDonnell
- Builder: Inchicore
- Build date: 1868—1876
- Total produced: 32
Specifications
- Configuration
  - Whyte: 2-4-0
- Gauge: 5 ft 3 in (1,600 mm)
- Driver dia.: 6 ft 6 in (1,980 mm)
- Loco weight: 32 long tons (33 t)
- Fuel type: Coal
- Boiler pressure: 140 lbf/in^{2} (0.97 MPa)
- Cylinders: 2
- Cylinder size: 16 in × 22 in (406 mm × 559 mm)
Career
- Operators: GS&WR
- Disposition: all scrapped
- Details refer to initial batch of six built in 1868, details vary for later batches notably those for secondary work with 5' 7" wheels

The GS&WR McDonnell 2-4-0 types were a set of passenger locomotive classes introduced on the Great Southern and Western Railway (GS&WR) of Ireland by its locomotive engineer Alexander McDonnell between about 1868 and 1877.

== History ==
Alexander McDonnell joined the GS&WR as locomotive superintendent in 1864, replacing John Wakefield. McDonnell brought experience from the London & North Western Railway at Crewe and was impressed by the designs being produced by Beyer, Peacock & Company of Manchester at that time. McDonnell used designs from Beyer Peacock as the basis for the GS&WR Class 101 0-6-0 goods locomotive which was to become the most numerous type in Ireland. The Dublin to Cork express services were powered by Wakefield's 2-2-2 locomotives and McDonnell in 1968 again turned to Beyer-Peacock drawings to direct Inchicore to produce six passenger express 2-4-0 locomotives with 6-foot-6-inch (1.98 m) driving wheels and 16-by-22-inch (410 mm × 560 mm) cylinders for express passenger work.

A smaller design suitable for secondary passenger duties with 5-foot-8-inch (1.73 m) wheels and 15-by-22-inch (380 mm × 560 mm) cylinders was produced from 1869. While McDonnell aimed for standardisation locomotives were sometimes included parts reclaimed from scrapped locomotives for economy reasons. Additional batches of both the express and secondary types were built with a number of variations.

The larger 2-4-0 locomotives were all withdrawn before the start of the twentieth century, Three of the lighter type built in 1873 survived until amalgamation to Great Southern Railways in 1925 though were withdrawn shortly thereafter in 1928.

== Fleet ==
All the locomotives were constructed at Inchicore and utilised a maximum boiler pressure of 140 lbf/in^{2} (0.97 MPa).

McDonnell 2-4-0 Locomotives for GS&WR (Note: There may be instances of discrepancies between (Murray & McNeil, 1971) and (Rowledge, 1993) in matters of dates, wheel sizes, cylinder dimension and Nos. 62—63)
| Class | Nos. | Type | Introduced | Count | Wheelsize | Cylinder | Weight | Notes |
|---|---|---|---|---|---|---|---|---|
| 56 | 56—61 | Express | 1868—70 | 6 | 6 feet 6 inches (1.98 m) | 16 by 22 inches (410 mm × 560 mm) | 32 LT | |
| 1 | 1, 4, 9, 11, 14, 16–19, 3, 12, 20 | Secondary | 1869—74 | 12 | 5 feet 7 1/2 inches (1.715 m) | 15 by 22 inches (380 mm × 560 mm) | | |
| 62 | 62–63 | Express? | 1870—71 | 2 | 6 feet 0 inches (1.83 m) | 16 by 22 inches (410 mm × 560 mm) | | |
| 21 | 21—26, 66—69 | Secondary | 1873-76 | 10 | 5 feet 8 inches (1.73 m) | 16 by 20 inches (410 mm × 510 mm) | 27 LT | |
| 64 | 64—65 | Express | 1875 | 2 | 6 feet 6 1/2 inches (1.994 m) | 17 by 22 inches (430 mm × 560 mm) | 30 LT | |

== Legacy ==
McDonnell developed the lightweight 2-4-0 into the Kerry bogie 4-4-0 in 1877 with the addition of a swing-link bogie mechanism used in American practice. Henry Ivatt later used the lightweight design as the basis for his 2-4-2T tank locomotives. The larger express passenger locomotive was a predecessor to the Aspinall GS&WR Class 52 and 60, which in turn led through to the Robert Coey 4-4-0 passenger locomotives.
