= GS&WR Class 201 =

Class of Irish 0-6-0T locomotives

Great Southern & Western Railway Class 201
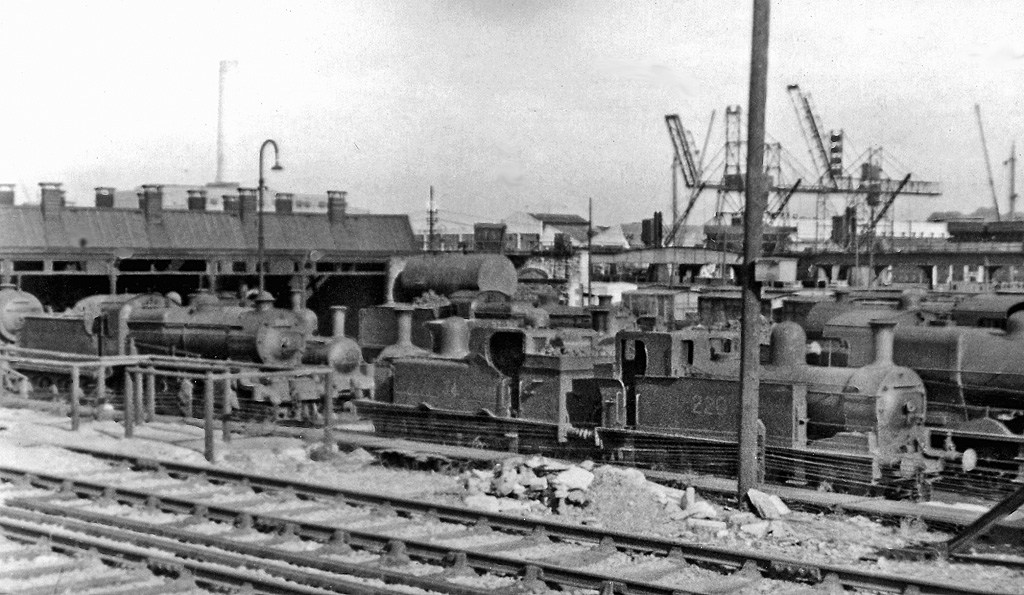
- Class 201 No. 220 (right foreground) at Cork (Glanmire Road) Locomotive Depot, 17 July 1955
Type and origin
- Power type: Steam
- Designer: Henry Ivatt
- Builder: Inchicore Works
- Build date: 1887 (4), 1895 (2), 1901 (4)
- Total produced: 10
Specifications
- Configuration
  - Whyte: 0-6-0T
  - UIC: C n2t
- Gauge: 5 ft 3 in (1,600 mm)
- Driver dia.: 4 ft 6 1/2 in (1.384 m)
- Axle load: 1887/1895 locos: 15 long tons 0 cwt (33,600 lb or 15.2 t), 1901 locos: 15 long tons 10 cwt (34,700 lb or 15.7 t)
- Loco weight: 1887 locos: 40 long tons 5 cwt (90,200 lb or 40.9 t), 1895 locos: 42 long tons 15 cwt (95,800 lb or 43.4 t), 1901 locos: 43 long tons 16 cwt (98,100 lb or 44.5 t)
- Fuel type: Coal
- Fuel capacity: 1887 locos: 2 long tons 0 cwt (4,500 lb or 2 t); 1895/1901 locos: 1 long ton 10 cwt (3,400 lb or 1.5 t)
- Water cap.: 1887 locos: 945 imp gal (4,300 L; 1,135 US gal); 1895/1901 locos: 730 imp gal (3,300 L; 880 US gal)
- Firebox
  - Grate area: 18.8 to 19.3 sq ft (1.75 to 1.79 m^{2})
- Boiler pressure: 150 to 160 psi (1.03 to 1.10 MPa)
- Heating surface
  - Firebox: 105 to 112.5 sq ft (9.75 to 10.45 m^{2})
  - Tubes: 823 to 938 sq ft (76.5 to 87.1 m^{2})
- Cylinders: Two, inside
- Cylinder size: 18 in × 24 in (457 mm × 610 mm)
Performance figures
- Tractive effort: 18,200 to 19,400 lbf (80.96 to 86.30 kN)
Career
- Operators: GS&WR → GSR → CIÉ
- Class: GS&WR: 201; GSR/CIÉ: 201 or J11
- Numbers: 201, 202, 207–210, 217–220
- Withdrawn: 1949–1963
- Disposition: All scrapped

The GS&WR Class 201 was a class of ten 0-6-0T locomotives designed by Locomotive Engineer, Henry Ivatt in 1887 for shunting heavy goods trains at Kingsbridge and Cork yards. Although the design is generally attributed to Ivatt they were actually created in the last year of Alexander McDonnell's tenure. The locomotives were built in three batch with variations between batches: Nos. 207—210 were introduced in 1887; 201 and 202 followed in 1895 taking numbers formerly held by Sambo and Negro; while the final batch 214—217 emerged in 1901.

== Design ==
The decision to proceed with an 0-6-0T design was discussed between Ivatt and John Aspinall due to issues with preceding 0-6-4T locomotives. Ivatt's design incorporated the same cylinders, coupled-wheels and boilers as the 0-6-4Ts.

== Service ==
Constraints on the locomotive design meant that the coupled wheelbase had to be as short as possible to negotiate the curves in the dock areas but the locomotive had to have sufficient power available for the increasing load of the trains.

Under the system employed by the Great Southern Railways they became Class J11. All of the class survived until 1949, with No. 217 being withdrawn in 1961 and No. 201 withdrawn in 1963.
