= GS&WR Class 52 =

GS&WR 52 & 60 Classes
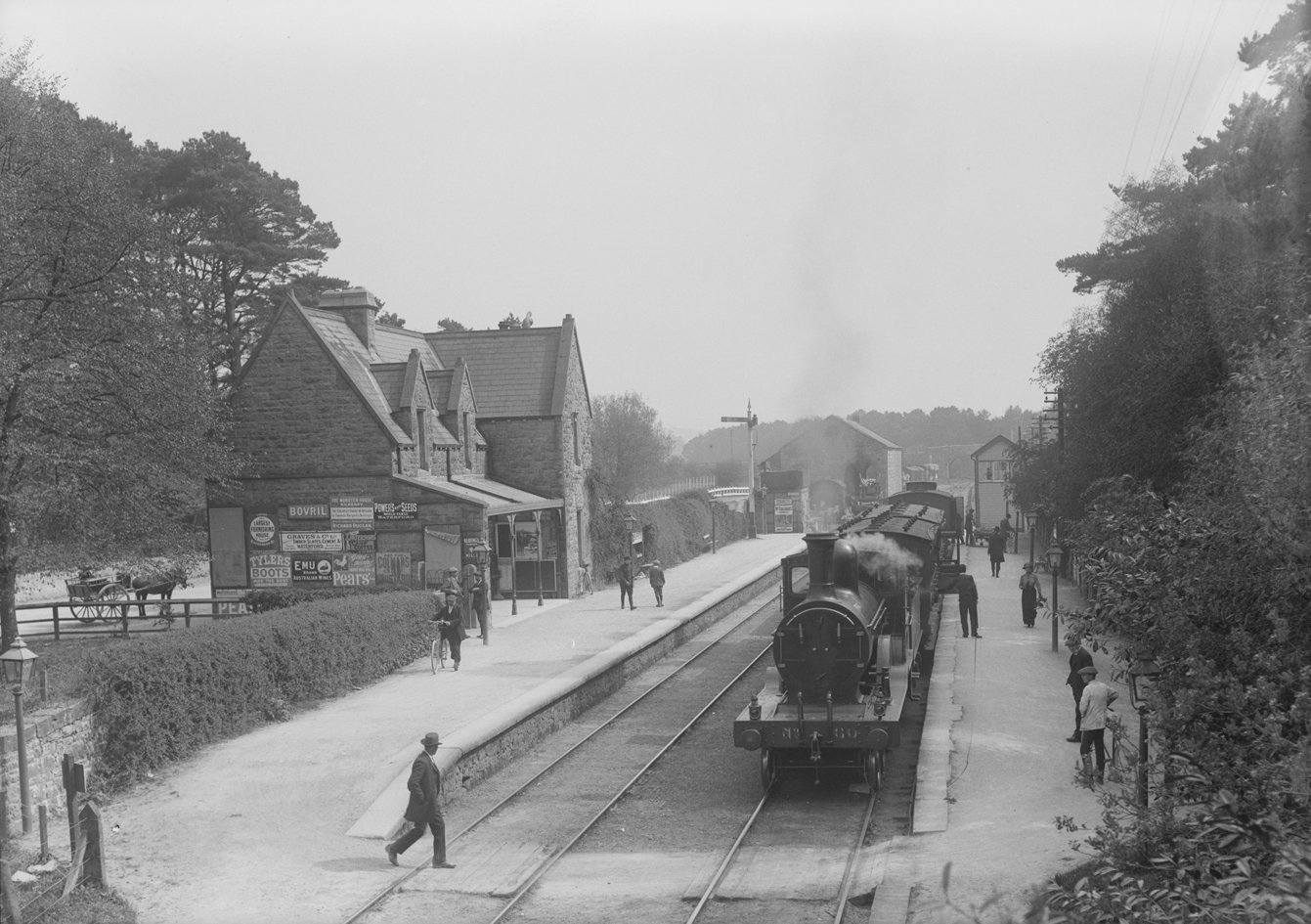
- No. 60 at Abbeyleix 1909
Type and origin
- Power type: Steam
- Designer: J Aspinall
- Builder: Inchicore
- Build date: 1883—1895
- Total produced: 30 plus 15 in class 60
Specifications
- Configuration
  - Whyte: 4-4-0
- Gauge: 5 ft 3 in (1,600 mm)
- Leading dia.: 3 ft 0 in (910 mm)
- Driver dia.: 6 ft 7 in (2,010 mm)
- Length: 27 ft 6 1/2 in (8,395 mm)
- Axle load: 12.4 long tons (12.6 t)
- Loco weight: 36.4 long tons (37.0 t)
- Water cap.: 2,730 imp gal (12,400 L; 3,280 US gal)
- Boiler pressure: 160 lbf/in^{2} (1.10 MPa)
- Cylinders: 2
- Cylinder size: 17 in × 22 in (432 mm × 559 mm)
Performance figures
- Tractive effort: 10,940 lbf (48.66 kN)
Career
- Operators: GS&WR; GSR; CIÉ
- Class: D17/D14/D13 (Inchicore)
- Number in class: 30+15
- Numbers: 1,3,4,9,11,12,14,16,18,20,52—59,97,98; 60—65,85—89,93—96
- Locale: Ireland
- Withdrawn: 1959
- Details for Class 52 as built

The Great Southern and Western Railway (GS&WR) Class 52 consisted of twenty 4-4-0 express passenger tender locomotives designed by John Aspinall. Aspinall also built a further fifteen similar but slightly larger locomotives of GS&WR Class 60.

The locomotives were built soon after Aspinall took up his post, and were to an extent a derivation of an Alexander McDonnell 2-4-0 design incorporating the same boiler but having a leading bogie.

== Improved Class 60 ==
The Class 60 was a more powerful evolution of Class 52, being slightly heavier and having an increased tractive effort.

== Service ==
The GSR Class 52 was initially deployed on fast express main-line services, and were almost immediately displayed to more secondary duties by the GS&WR Class 60. The arrival of the GS&WR Class 301 and later more powerful locomotives seen them all displaced to secondary routes. They were even known to work Dublin to Bray suburban services on very rare occasions despite their large diameter wheels being less suitable for fast acceleration.
