= L&YR Class 26 =

British steam locomotive class (1903–1926)

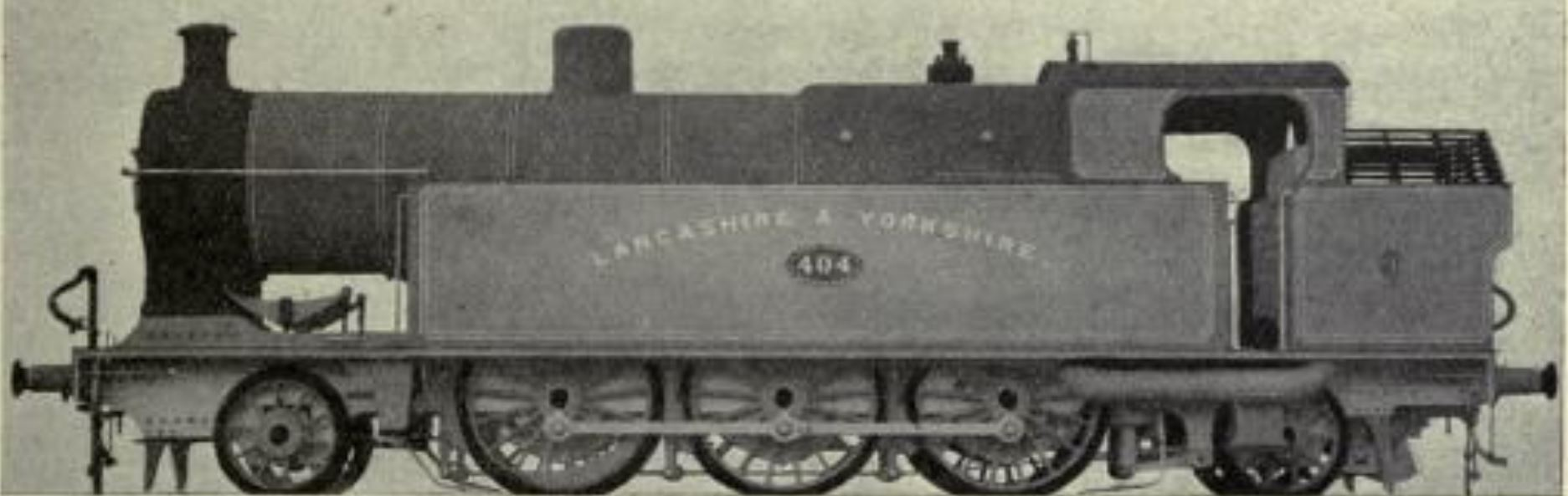
Type and origin
- Power type: Steam
- Designer: Henry Hoy
- Builder: Horwich Works
- Order number: Lot 49
- Serial number: 861–880
- Build date: October 1903 – August 1904
- Total produced: 20
Specifications
- Configuration
  - Whyte: 2-6-2T
  - UIC: 1′C1′ n2t
- Gauge: 4 ft 8 1/2 in (1,435 mm)
- Leading dia.: 3 ft 7 3/4 in (1.111 m)
- Driver dia.: 5 ft 8 in (1.727 m)
- Trailing dia.: 3 ft 7 3/4 in (1.111 m)
- Length: 42 ft 4 in (12.9 m)
- Loco weight: 77.5 long tons (78.7 t)
- Fuel type: Coal
- Fuel capacity: 3.75 long tons (3.81 t)
- Water cap.: 2,000 imp gal (9,100 L; 2,400 US gal)
- Firebox
  - Grate area: 26.0 sq ft (2.42 m^{2})
- Boiler pressure: 175 lbf/in^{2} (1.21 MPa)
- Heating surface: 2,038.6 sq ft (189.39 m^{2})
- Cylinders: Two, inside
- Cylinder size: 19 in × 26 in (483 mm × 660 mm)
- Valve gear: Joy
Performance figures
- Tractive effort: 19,797 lbf (88.1 kN)
Career
- Operators: Lancashire and Yorkshire Railway; → London, Midland and Scottish Railway
- Power class: LMS: 3F
- Withdrawn: December 1920 – August 1926
- Disposition: All scrapped

The L&YR Class 26 was a class of 20 2-6-2T passenger steam locomotives of the Lancashire and Yorkshire Railway designed by Henry Hoy and introduced in 1903. Most passed to the London, Midland and Scottish Railway (LMS) at the grouping in 1923 though they were withdrawn soon afterwards with none remaining in service after 1926.

== Design and construction ==
Hoy intended the class to work Manchester, Rochdale, Oldham and Bury services where the Aspinall 2-4-2T Class 5 struggled with the steeper gradients and heavier trains. They were somewhat of an evolutionary design, due to their larger size with six-coupled wheels and the Belpaire firebox used on the Class 7 High Flyers and Coal engine 0-8-0 types.

== Service ==
On introduction in 1903 they were allocated to Liverpool to Southport workings to cover a temporary shortage of electric stock. They were subsequently placed on their intended routes where they were initially successful, but problems shortly emerged. Their heavy weight damaged track and their long rigid wheelbase put pressure on rails in sharply-curved sidings. The centre wheels had their flanges removed which eased some issues but increased the risk of derailment on slightly misaligned track and most notably at junctions. This is because flangeless driving wheels work better on smaller wheels with short spacing. Their side tanks tended to leak badly and they gained a reputation for poor stopping ability.

When George Hughes upgraded to the Class 5 2-4-2T with superheaters they were able to replace the Class 26 and the latter were removed from passenger services in 1913. They were then placed on banking and shunting duties with water pickup equipment and coal rail removed for increased visibility. They performed poorly with their 5 ft 8 in (1.73 m) driving wheels and flangeless centre wheels.

== Numbering ==
Table of locomotives
L&YR no.	Built	LMS no.	Withdrawn	Notes
202	Oct 1903	—	Dec 1920	
387	Nov 1903	11700	May 1925	
404	Nov 1903	—	Dec 1920	
454	Nov 1903	11701	Jan 1926	
467	Dec 1903	11702	May 1925	
527	Jan 1904	11703	Mar 1926	
712	Feb 1904	11704	Aug 1926	
744	Feb 1904	11705	Aug 1926	
837	Mar 1904	11706	Jun 1925	
125	Mar 1904	—	May 1923	
1441	Apr 1904	11707	Aug 1926	
1442	Apr 1904	11708	Jul 1925	
1443	May 1904	11709	Jun 1925	
1444	May 1904	11710	Jan 1925	
1445	Jun 1904	11711	Sep 1924	
1446	Jun 1904	11712	Aug 1926	
1447	Jul 1904	11713	Feb 1926	
1448	Jul 1904	11714	Feb 1925	
1449	Jul 1904	11715	1924	
1450	Aug 1904	11716	Aug 1926	

== Withdrawal ==
One was withdrawn in 1920 with irreparably cracked frames. Three (Nos 202, 404 and 125) were withdrawn in 1923 before being allocated an LMS number. Ultimately only Nos. 11704 and 11711 carried their LMS number in service and all members of the class were withdrawn by 1926. All were scrapped by 1928.

== Sources ==
- Baxter, Bertram (1982a). Baxter, David (ed.). British Locomotive Catalogue 1825–1923. Vol. 3B: Lancashire and Yorkshire Railway and its constituent companies. Ashbourne, Derbyshire: Moorland Publishing Company. ISBN 0-903485-85-0.
- Casserley, H. C. & Johnston, Stuart W. (1966). Locomotives at the Grouping 3: London, Midland and Scottish Railway. Shepperton, Surrey: Ian Allan. ISBN 0-7110-0554-0.
- Lane, Barry C. (2010). Lancashire & Yorkshire Railway Locomotives. Pendragon. ISBN 9781899816170.
