= GS&WR Class 47 =

GSWR Classes 28 & 47
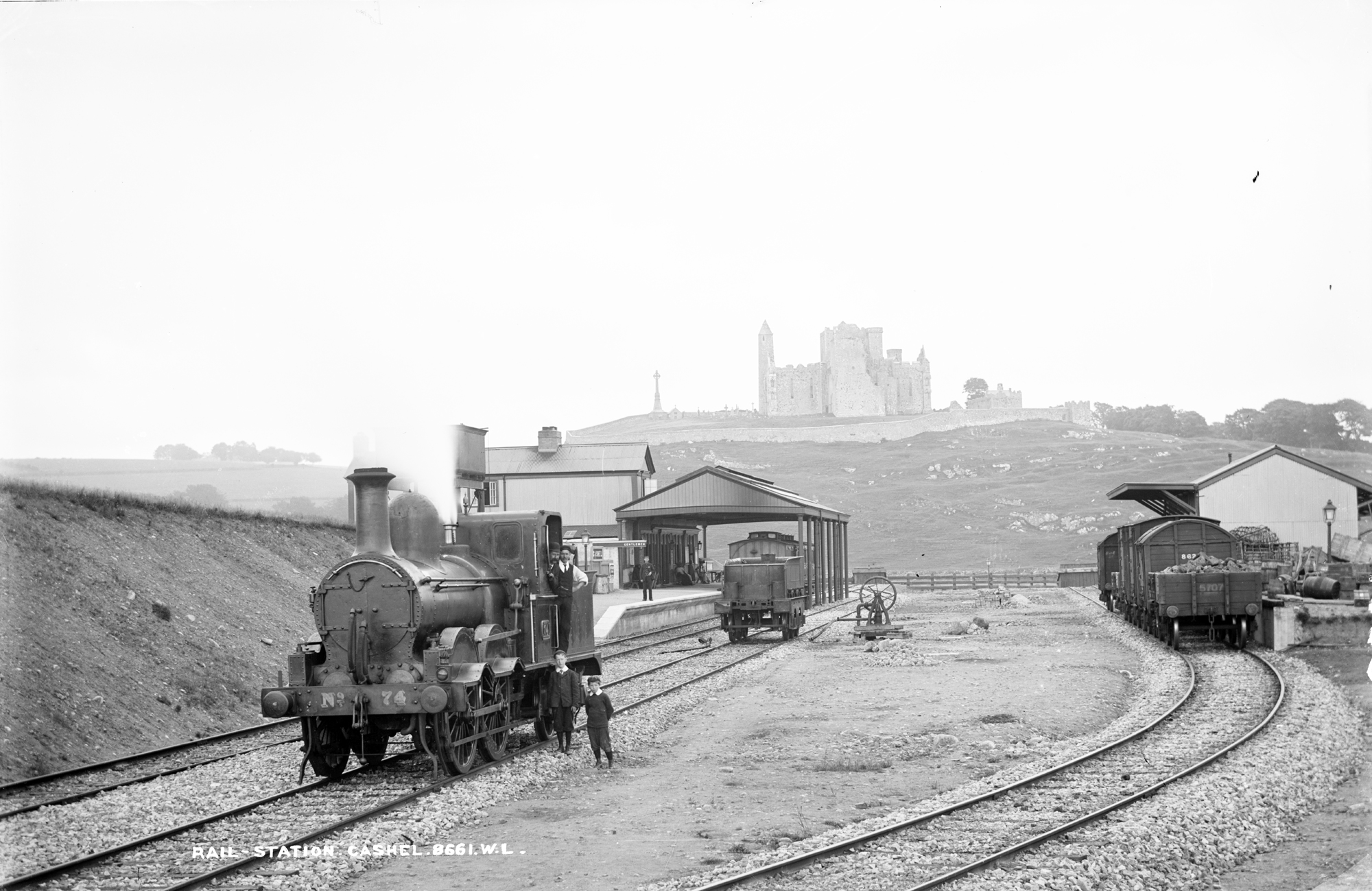
- No. 74 at Rock of Cashel 1905
Type and origin
- Power type: Steam
- Designer: Alexander McDonnell
- Builder: Inchicore
- Build date: 1879—1887
- Total produced: 23
Specifications
- Configuration
  - Whyte: 0-4-4BT
- Gauge: 5 ft 3 in (1,600 mm)
- Driver dia.: 5 ft 8 1/2 in (1,740 mm)
- Trailing dia.: 3 ft 9 in (1,140 mm)
- Length: 33 ft 6 1/2 in (10,224 mm)
- Loco weight: 41.8 long tons (42.5 t)
- Water cap.: 1,044 imp gal (4,750 L; 1,254 US gal) back; 135 imp gal (610 L; 162 US gal) side
- Boiler pressure: 150 lbf/in^{2} (1.03 MPa)
- Cylinders: 2
- Cylinder size: 16 in × 20 in (406 mm × 508 mm)
Performance figures
- Tractive effort: 9,530 lbf (42.39 kN)
Career
- Operators: GS&WR; GSR
- Class: E3 (Inchicore)
- Power class: S/ RT
- Number in class: 20 (47); 4 (28)
- Numbers: 28,40,47–51,70–83
- Locale: Ireland
- Withdrawn: 1905—1945
- Disposition: All scrapped
- Details refer to class 47

The Great Southern and Western Railway (GS&WR) Class 47 consisted of twenty 0-4-4BT locomotives designed by Alexander McDonnell and introduced from 1883. They were intended for branch lines around Cork and for Dublin—Kildare and Dublin-Kilkenny services.

Class 47 was preceded by four members of class 28 introduced from about 1879, these having a slightly longer wheelbase. Only one of class 28 remaining into GSR service when it was renumbered 40 and included in GSR Class 47. This was the 100th locomotive built under the Alexander McDonnell period and was temporarily numbered 100 when new.

== Model ==
There is a detailed O Gauge model of engine 47 in the Fry model railway collection.
