= Launch-type boiler =

Type of steam boiler

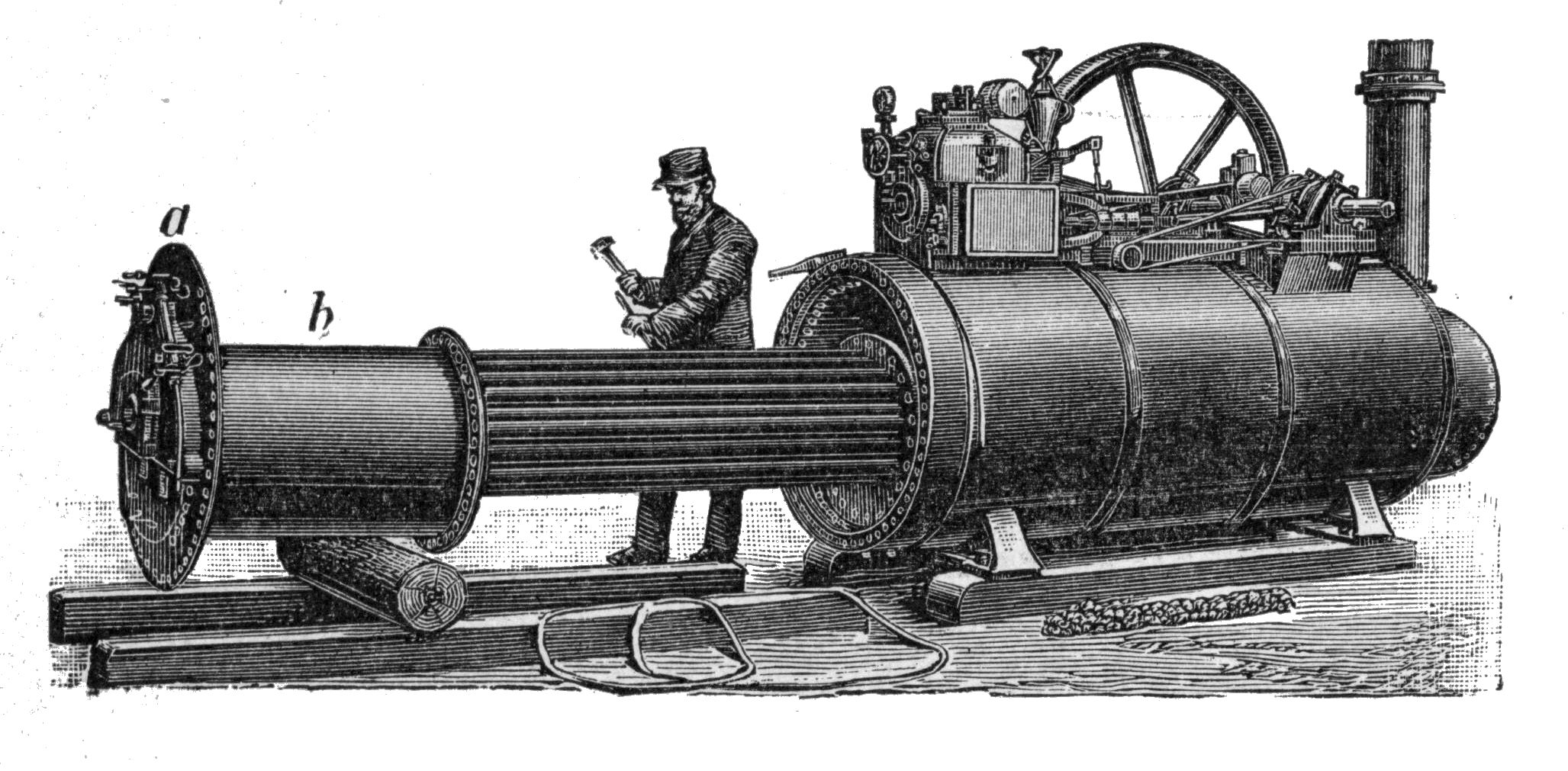
German semi-portable engine, with boiler firebox withdrawn for servicing

A launch-type, gunboat or horizontal multitubular boiler is a form of small steam boiler. It consists of a cylindrical horizontal shell with a cylindrical furnace and fire-tubes within this.

Their name derives from the boiler's popular use at one time for small steam yachts and launches. They have also been used in some early Naval torpedo boat destroyers.

== Description ==
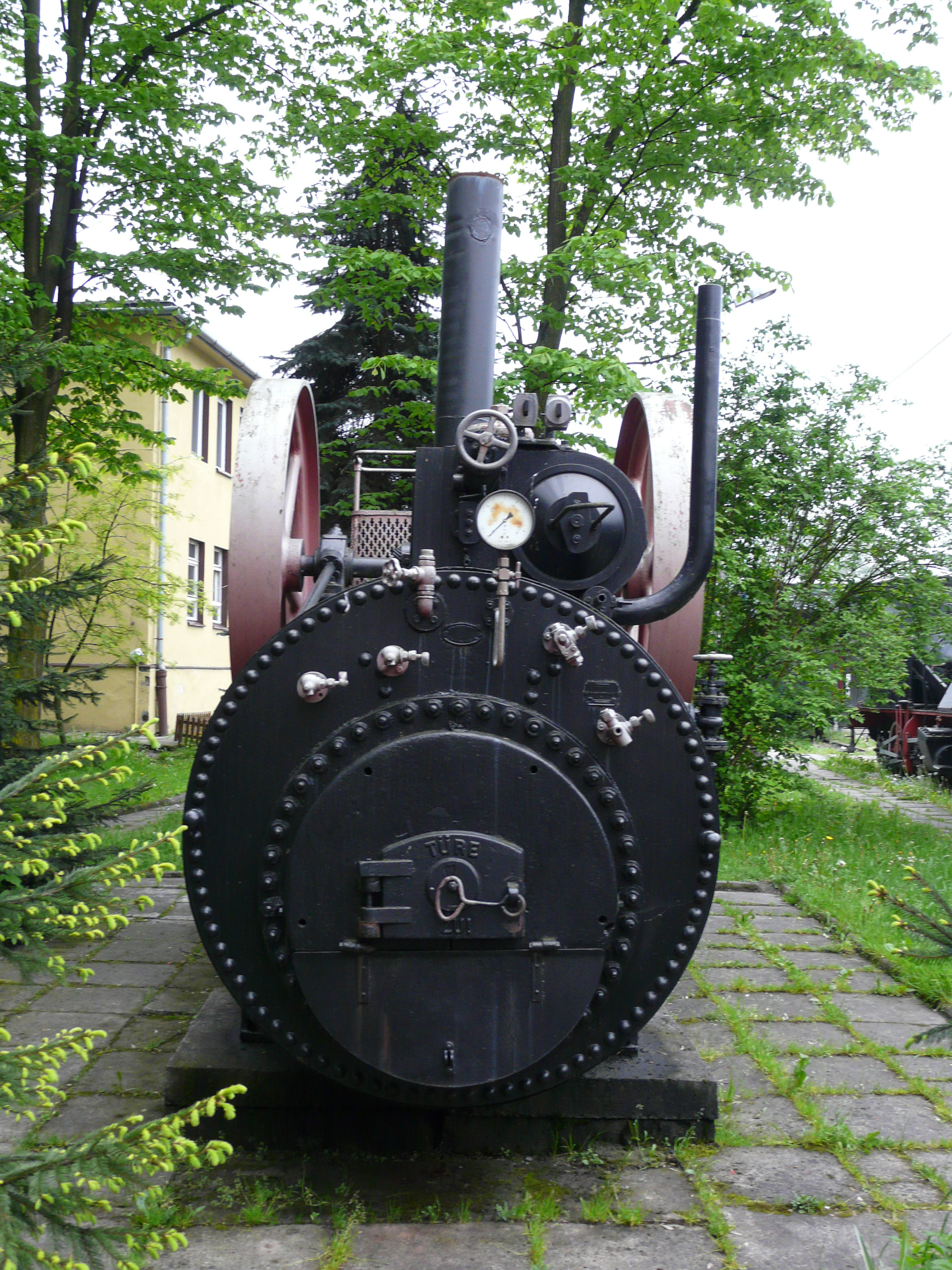
End-on view of the furnace, showing the small steam space above

The cylindrical furnace or firebox fits entirely within the boiler's outer shell. Unlike the locomotive boiler, there is no firebox grate emerging beneath the main boiler. The boiler has similarities with both the locomotive boiler (the multiple small fire-tubes), and the Scotch marine boiler (the short cylindrical furnace). As a fire-tube boiler it has generous heating area and so is an effective steamer. Firebox construction is also simpler, thus cheaper, than for the locomotive firebox. As the circular furnace is largely self-supporting against boiler pressure, it did not require the extensive and costly stays of the locomotive boiler. This also allowed the boiler to be made with a bolted joint in the outer shell and so the whole furnace and tube nest could be withdrawn for inspection and maintenance.

The firebox is of limited size though, and unlike the locomotive boiler cannot expand beyond the size of the boiler shell. This limits the sustained output that is possible. The grate and ashpan are also limited in size, the grate being a set of bars part-way across the furnace tube and the ashpan the restricted space beneath this. These features limit the boiler's ability to burn hard bituminous coal and they require a supply of Welsh steam coal, or similar, instead. Firing with wood or biomass fuels was difficult. Firebox capacity is further restricted by the space used for the ashpan and also by the dry-back furnace. The small ashpan also restricts their ability to steam for long periods.

One drawback of the boiler was the large diameter of the furnace relative to the boiler shell, and thus the small steam space above the crown of the furnace. This made the boilers prone to priming, particularly on a rough sea, where water could be carried over into the steam pipe.

A more serious danger was the limited reserve of the water level, where the water level had only to drop by a small amount owing to inattention before the furnace crown would be exposed, with likely overheating and risk of boiler explosion. The boiler was safe when correctly fired, but could not be left unattended. These water level restrictions became even more troublesome when the boiler was tilted, even by as little as a steep railway line. An unusual rate of wear and number of replacement furnaces supplied for the Heywood locomotives has been put down to this cause.

The boiler did see some popularity in mainland Europe, as a boiler for small portable engines. A similar boiler, but arranged with return fire-tubes, was built in America as the Huber boiler.

== Bagnall boiler ==
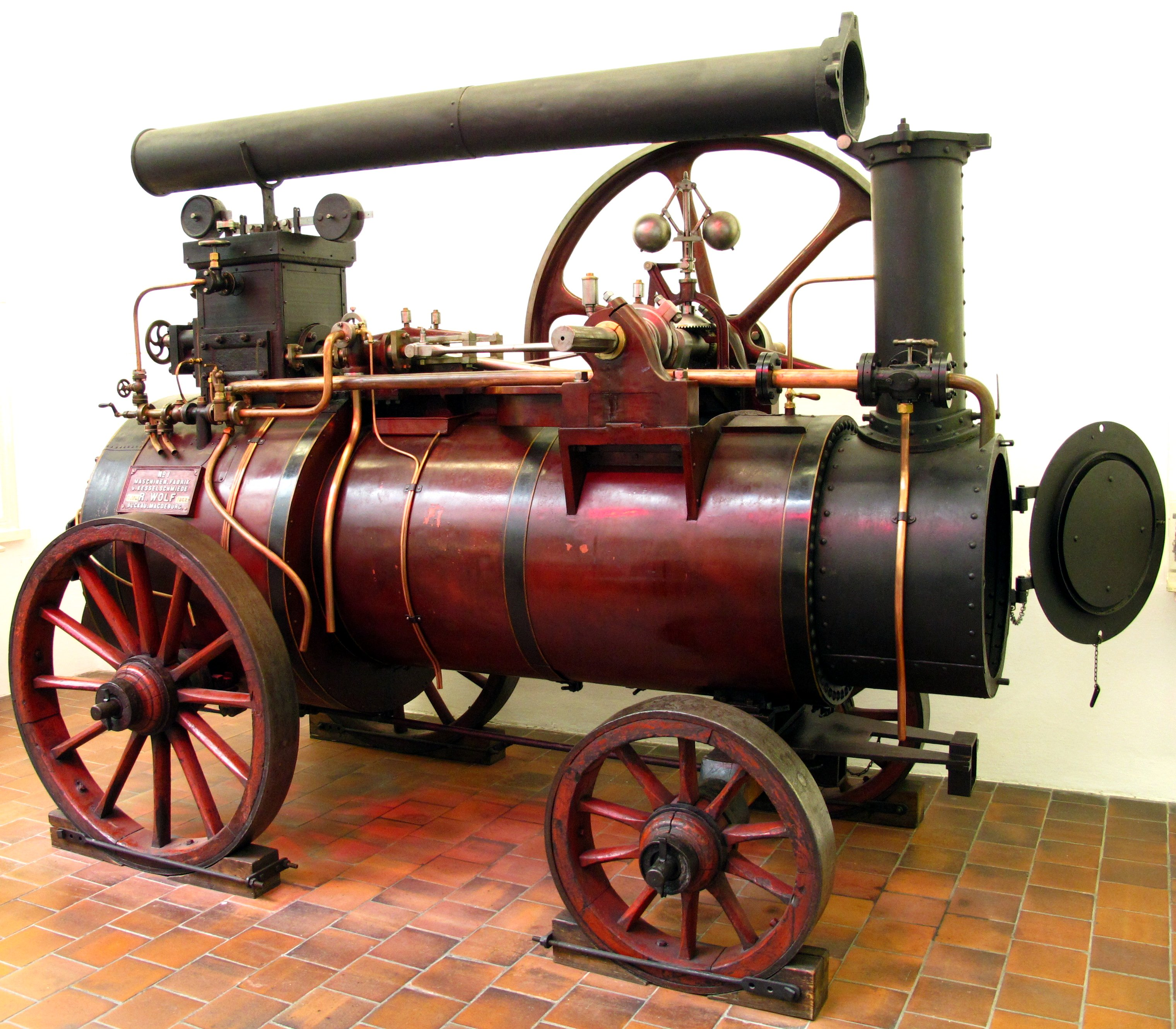
Early semi-portable engine, 1860s, with enlarged furnace

To reduce the limitations of the small furnace, an enlarged form was developed. The area of the boiler shell alongside the furnace was enlarged in diameter, but remained circular. This permitted a larger diameter of furnace to be fitted. The firebox section of the shell was offset downwards, so that the tube nest from the upper part of the furnace was in the lowest, water-filled, portion of the shell. As the plates were still cylindrical they did not require stays, but there may have been a few small rod stays to support the flat part of the throatplate between the two sections of the shell.

This boiler design was used for semi-portable engines from the 1860s. As the wider grate allowed the burning of poor fuels, such as straw or sugarcane waste, it was favoured for agricultural use and was widely known as the 'colonial' type. Marshalls built many of these and patented the design as their 'Britannia' firebox. This was also offered in a lengthened form as a log-burning furnace, particularly for use in Australia and Africa where forest land was being clear-felled for agriculture.

All-circular launch boilers (rather than locomotive boilers) were not widely used in coal-rich Britain, apart from these enlarged types. They were sometimes known as 'marine' boilers, although this enlarged form was not favoured for marine use, owing to its raised centre of gravity.

=== Bagnall railway locomotives ===
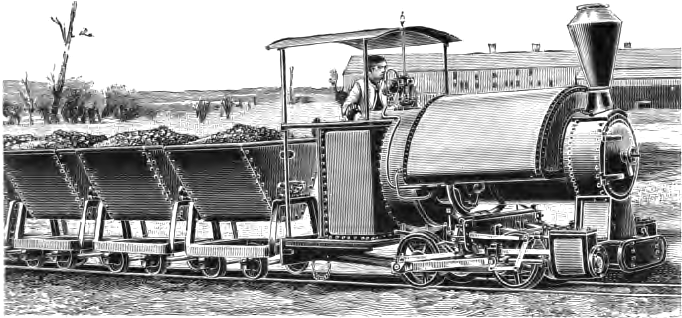
Small Bagnall contractor's loco

The enlarged circular firebox was also used by W. G. Bagnall for narrow-gauge locomotives, from 1890.

One of the last of these to be built, the last industrial narrow-gauge steam locomotive to be built for use in the UK, was Monarch, an articulated locomotive built in 1953 for Bowaters Paper Railway in Kent. This was originally built for the 2 ft sugar plantation railways in South Africa, but re-gauged to 2 ft 6 in. These were articulated to Bagnall's modified Meyer design. The original Meyer locomotive used two articulated bogies beneath a tank locomotive frame carrying the boiler and water tanks. This limited the space available for the firebox, a disadvantage which could be avoided, for small locos, by the use of Bagnall's boiler with a circular firebox entirely above the frames.

== Railway locomotives ==
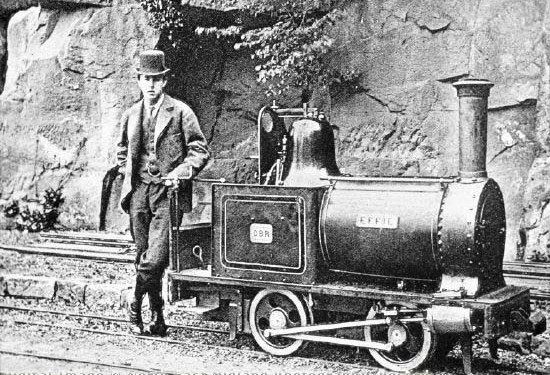
Locomotive Effie on Sir Arthur Heywood's Duffield Bank Railway

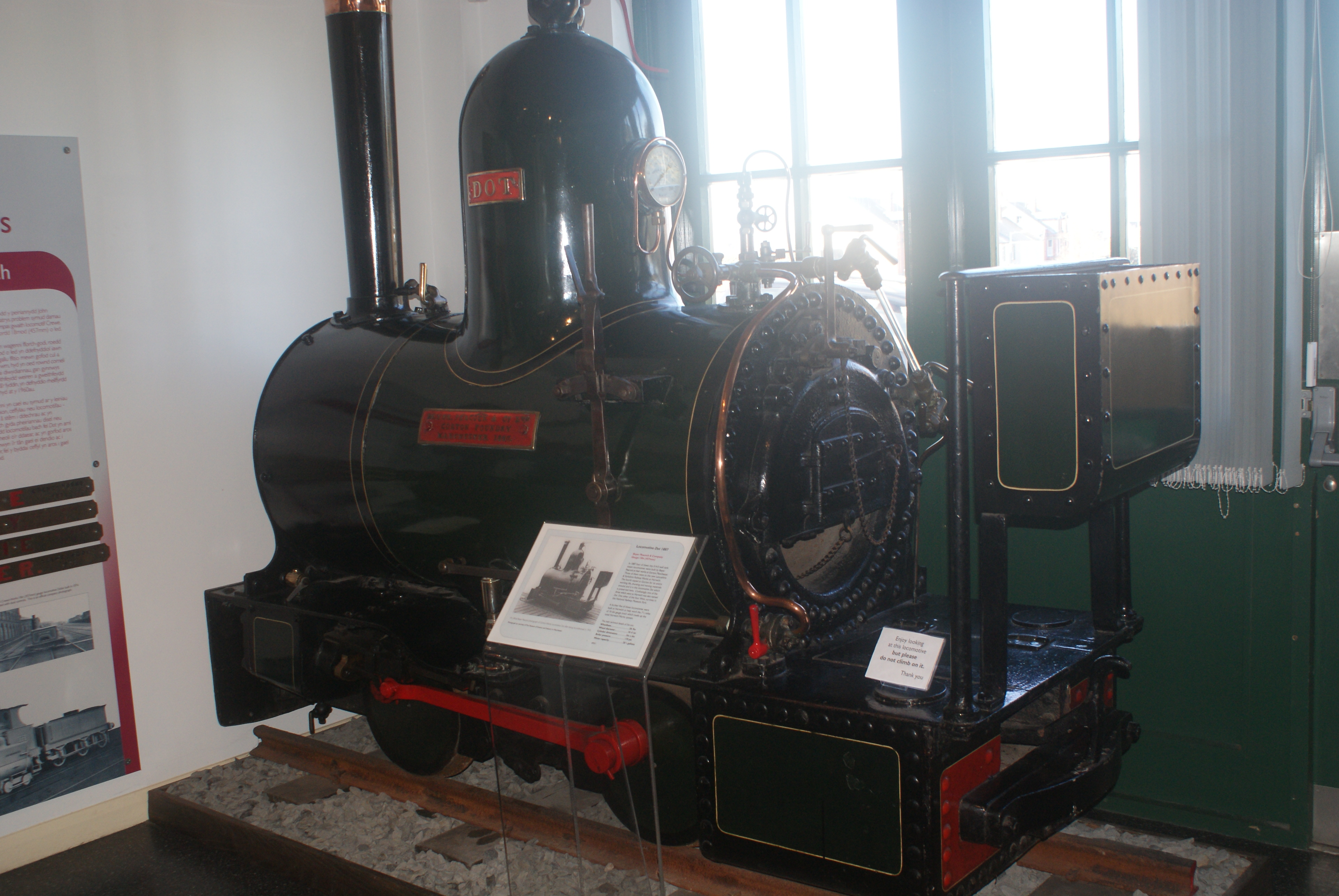
Dot, from the Gorton Foundry works railway

Launch-type boilers were only rarely used for railway locomotives, although they were notably used by Sir Arthur Heywood from 1874 for his 15 in (381 mm) minimum-gauge railways at Duffield Bank and Eaton Hall.

Other minimum-gauge railways, notable the 18 in (457 mm) gauge works railways at Crewe, Horwich and the Guinness brewery in Dublin, also used launch-type boilers, owing to the limited space between the frames for a conventional firebox.

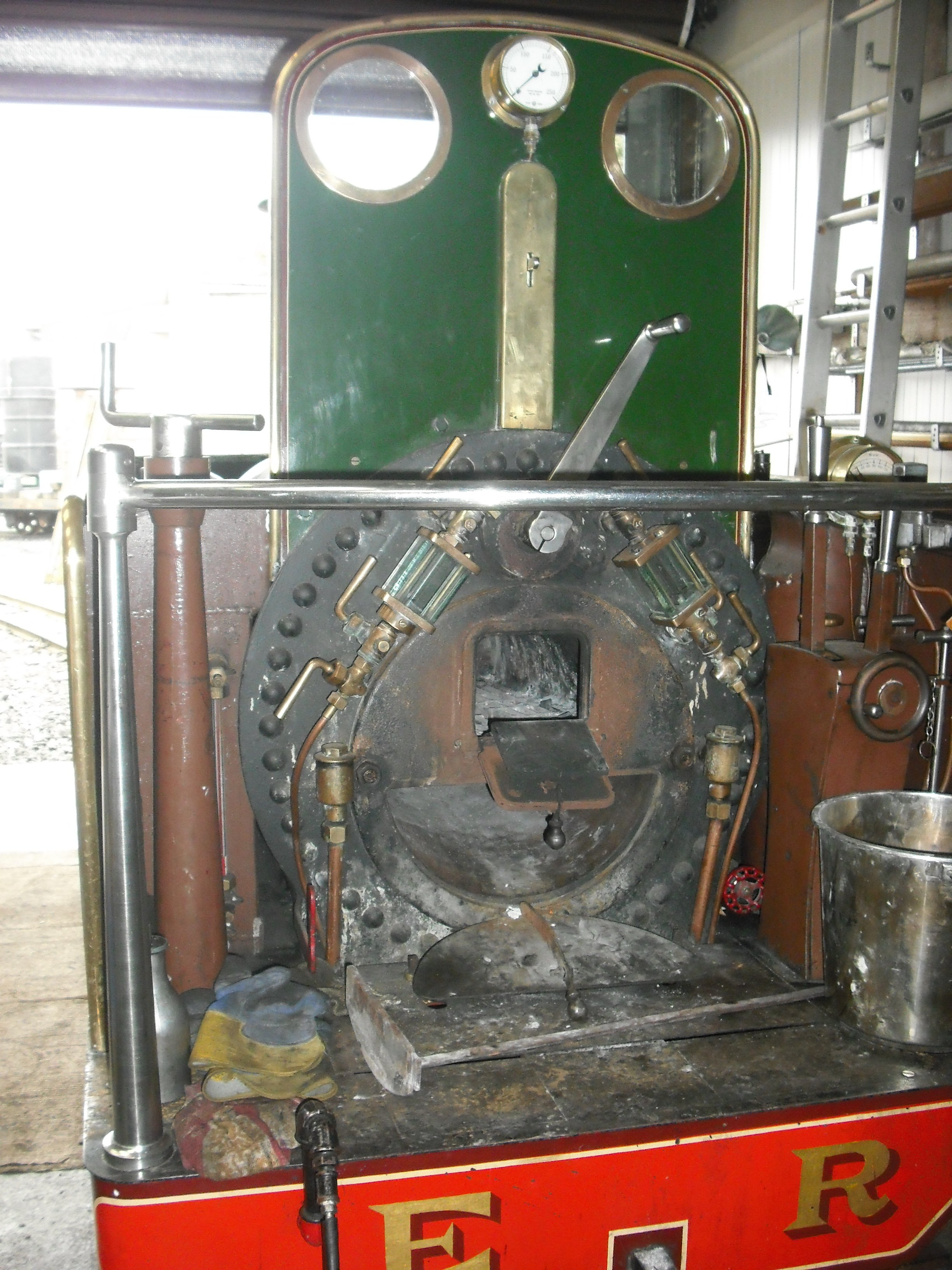
Heywood-designed Ursula at the Perrygrove Railway, showing the limited grate and ashpan size.

A limitation of this design for steam locomotives was the need to fit fire, grate and ashpan all within the confined circular furnace tube. This limited the radiative heating surface of the furnace, and thus the immediate steam-raising power of the boiler. They were noted as being slower to light from cold than conventional. As the ashpan space beneath the grate was small, locomotives could only operate for a short time before needing to rake out this ashpan. On a main line railway this would have required a return to the engine shed. On small narrow-gauge contractor lines, the ash would simply be dumped wherever convenient and so this was much less of a drawback.

=== Conical boilers ===
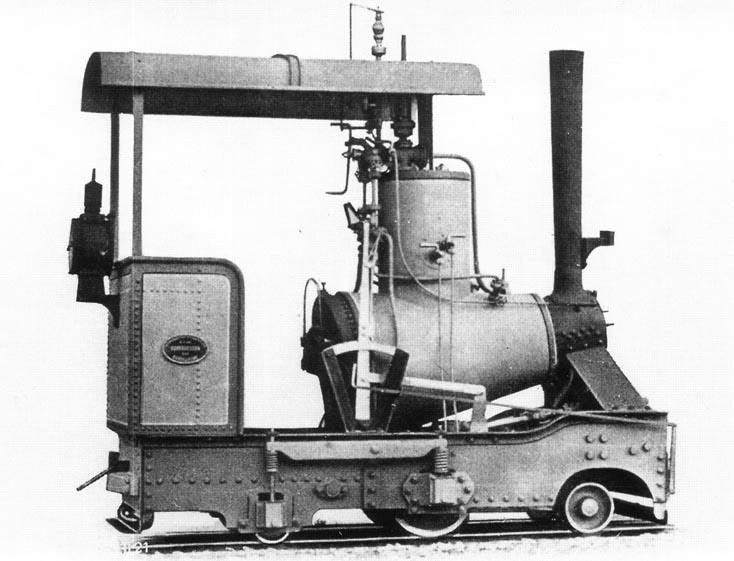
Hohenzollern Nº 447

In 1888 the Hohenzollern Locomotive Works delivered the first two narrow-gauge 600 mm (1 ft 11 5/8 in) Feldbahn locomotives for the Prussian Army. These used a conical development of the launch boiler. A backplate of enlarged diameter and a greatly reduced smokebox tubeplate were fitted into a steeply conical shell. This was installed with the upper edge (Note: or 'generatrix') of the cone horizontal. The purpose of the conical shape was to increase water depth over the furnace, the hottest part of the evaporative surface. The furnace and tubes were moved to the lower part of the shell, with the tubes running upwards parallel to the lower edge of the cone. A difficulty was the boiler's lack of steam space, requiring an enlarged dome, of almost as much capacity as the main shell. As a major virtue of the launch boiler is the simplicity of its construction, rolling a conical shell and fitting a large dome represented a considerable increase in their complexity and cost.

These locomotives, and their boilers, were a complete failure. They were undersized and underpowered for the task, with tiny wheels prone to derailment on uneven track and (for the first 2-2-2 locomotive) limited adhesion from its single driver. Despite being some years after Heywood and the publication of his Minimum Gauge Railways, they ignored almost all of Heywood's principles. The boilers lacked evaporative capacity and could not support sustained running.

=== Lentz boiler ===
A large launch-type boiler with a corrugated furnace, described as the Lentz boiler, was fitted to the first Heilmann steam-electric locomotive 'La Fusée Electrique' of 1890. The boiler design was German in origin. A similar boiler, the 'Vanderbilt' was used in the USA.

=== Lancashire & Yorkshire Railway ===
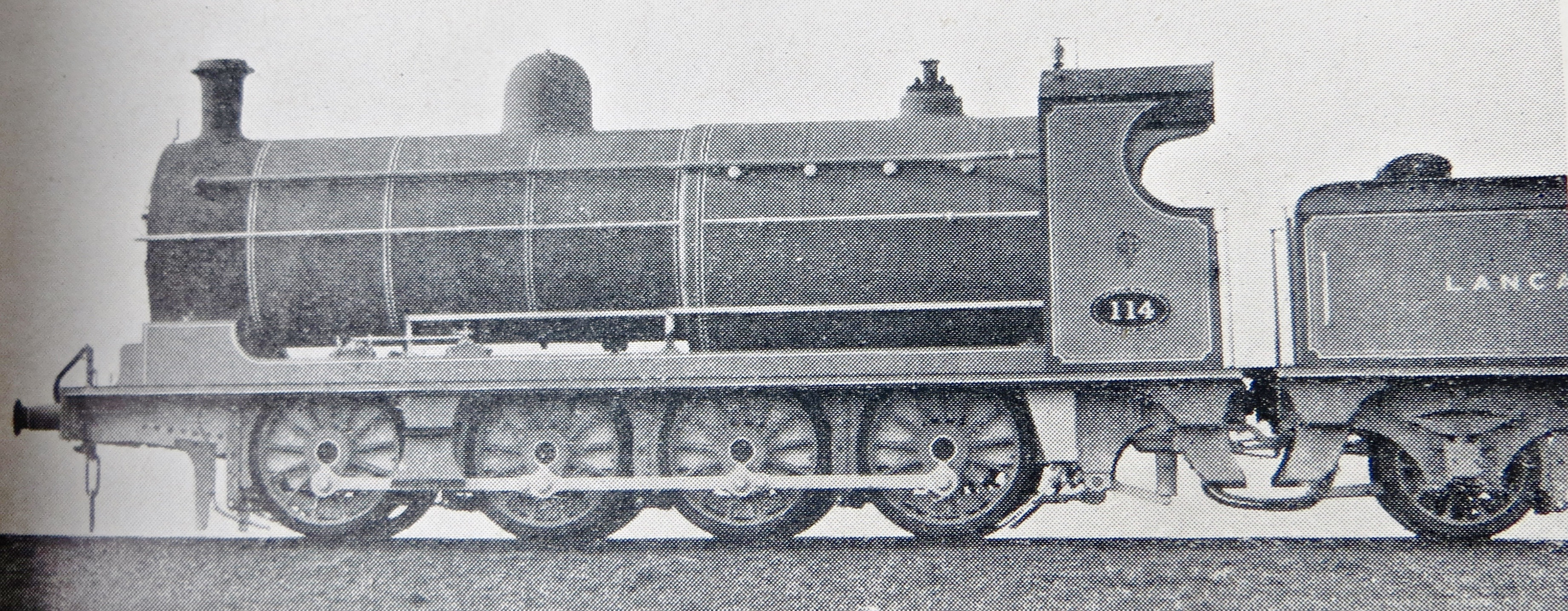
L&YR Class 30 with cylindrical furnace

The Lancashire and Yorkshire Railway suffered problems with firebox stays, leading to a boiler explosion with an 0-8-0 'Class 30' near Knottingley in 1901 Their Chief Mechanical Engineer Henry Hoy, sought to avoid the problems of the stayed firebox altogether and so developed an alternative boiler and firebox. This used a corrugated tubular furnace and cylindrical outer firebox, as for the Lentz. Such corrugated furnaces were already in widespread use locally, with the Lancashire and Galloway stationary boilers of the Lancashire cotton mills and local makers already had several designs available. The furnace was also of steel, rather than the copper used for fireboxes at this time. Hoy's involvement was ironic, as a major cause of the original accident had been Hoy's invention of a new brass alloy for firebox stays, an inelastic alloy that turned out to have serious drawbacks. One Class 30, 396, was rebuilt in 1903 and 20 more were built new with this boiler.

The boilers showed a number of drawbacks in service. They were slow to warm up after lighting, and the limited ashpan space limited their working time away from the shed. Both of these were as a result of the furnace heating area largely being shielded by the grate across it. It has been suggested that they would have been more successful with oil firing, (Note: This was a modern development in boiler firing at the time, exemplified by the new Dreadnought-class battleships. Holden on the Great Eastern Railway was also experimenting with oil firing. However the L&YR was based in the Lancashire Coalfield.) as this would have allowed the whole furnace diameter to have been used and would have avoided ash build up.

The new boiler design did not last long in service and the locomotives were rebuilt with conventional boilers after ten years. (Note: The eight to ten year interval before rebuilding would be a typical service life for such a boiler. It indicates that the boilers were adequate, and were not withdrawn from service merely to replace them, but also that the experiment was not considered a success and so they were not continued with.) Hoy's successor, George Hughes, described these boilers unfavourably in papers read to the I. Mech E.

=== NZR E class ===
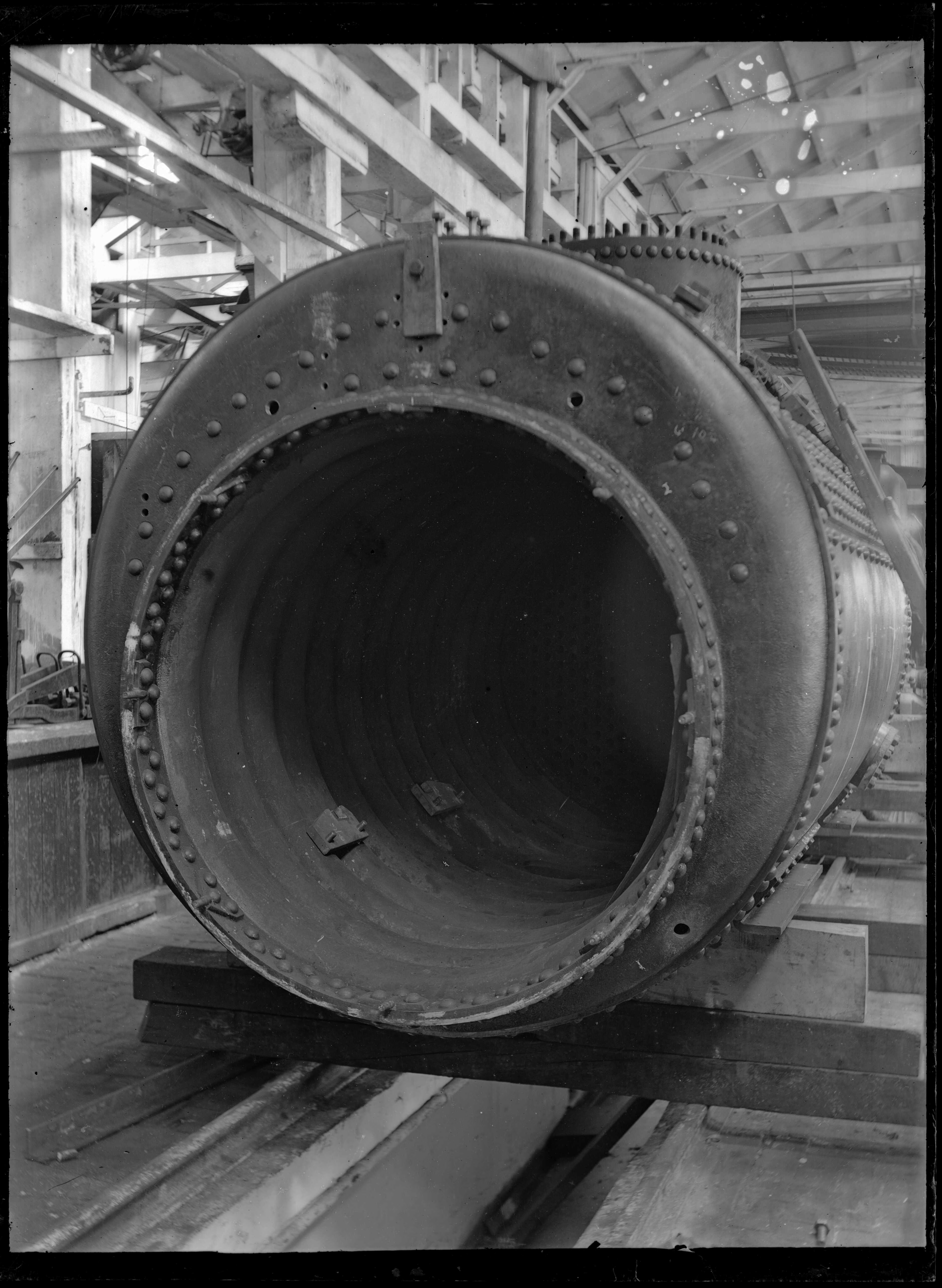
Corrugated furnace of the NZR E class

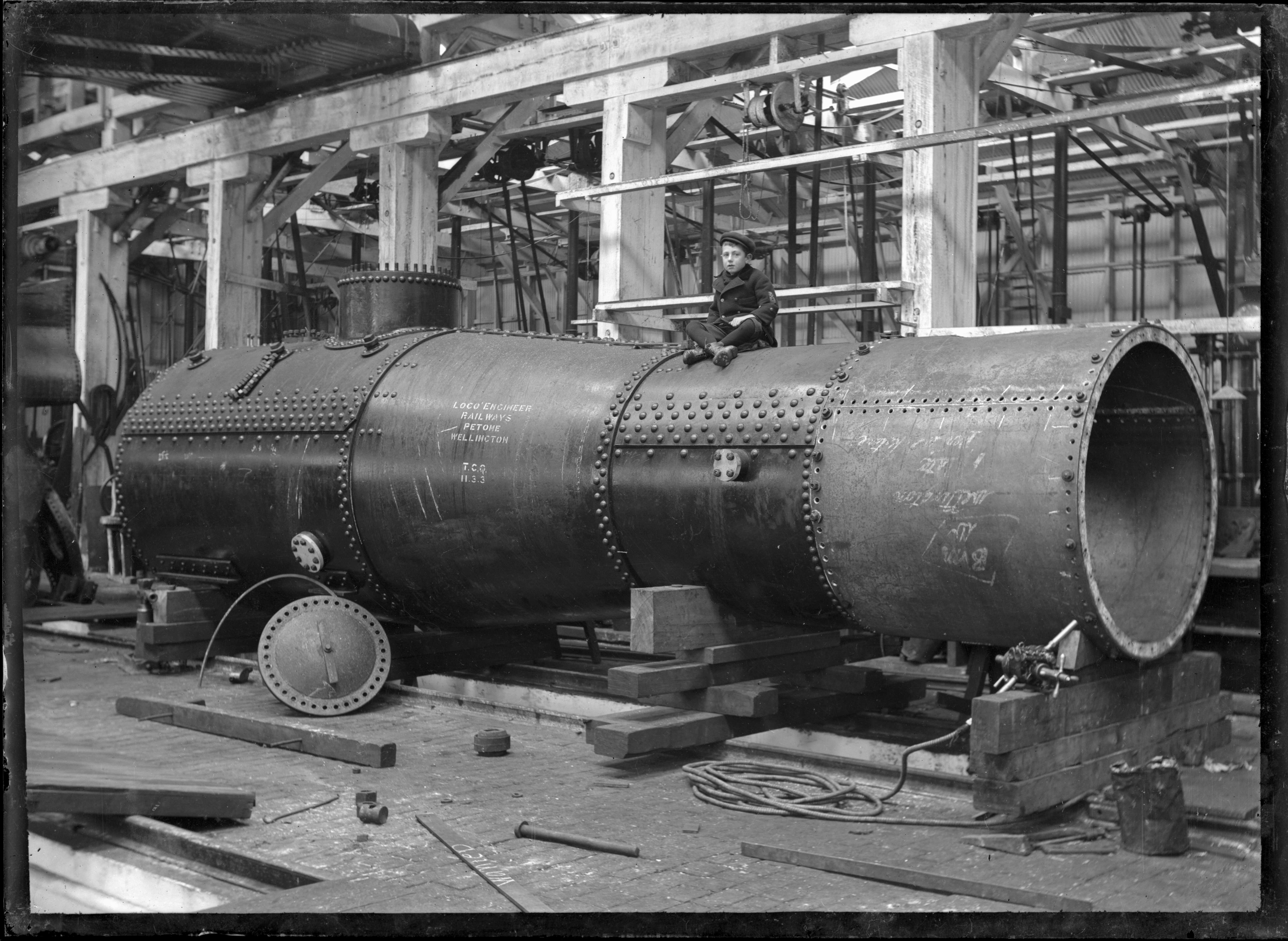
Boiler of the NZR E class

The single NZR E class of 1906 was an experimental Vauclain compound articulated 2-6-6-0T Mallet, intended for working the Rimutaka Incline. Compounding encouraged the choice of the then remarkably high boiler pressure of 200 psi (14 bar; 1,400 kPa), which required a strong firebox construction. The NZR chief draughtsman G. A. Pearson chose a corrugated furnace design in a tapered boiler, similar to the Vanderbilt.
