= Henry Hoy =

Henry Albert Hoy (1855–1910) was a locomotive engineer with the Lancashire and Yorkshire Railway (L&YR). Hoy was born on 13 January 1855 in London, and educated at King Edward VI's Grammar School in St Albans, and at St John's College, Liverpool University.

== Career ==
=== London and North Western Railway ===
In 1872 he began an apprenticeship under Francis William Webb at the London and North Western Railway's Crewe works. In 1878 Hoy transferred to the drawing office, where he designed continuous brakes.

=== Lancashire and Yorkshire Railway ===
In 1884 Hoy moved to the L&YR, becoming an outdoor assistant in the locomotive department under Barton Wright in Manchester; he was promoted to works manager a year later. In 1886 Hoy was made works manager at the L&YR's new works at Horwich. He worked principally on electrical engineering.

When John Aspinall was appointed General Manager in 1899, Hoy became Chief Mechanical Engineer. His principal contribution was the design of an electrification system for the Liverpool to Southport line, including motor bogies.

==== Locomotive designs ====
See: Locomotives of the Lancashire and Yorkshire Railway

Hoy's only locomotive design was a twenty-strong class of troublesome 2-6-2Ts, built 1903–04, which became LMS nos. 11700–11716.

He conducted various other experiments. One of these was the use of a new brass alloy for making firebox stays. Its composition was 62% parts copper, 38% parts zinc and 0.37% of iron. This alloy was a failure. Despite being claimed to be more elastic, it suffered problems in service. In the worst of these, a fatal boiler explosion with a Class 30 0-8-0 near Knottingley in 1901 was caused by the failure of a number of firebox rod stays made from this alloy. These locomotives were an Aspinall design, but had been constructed during Hoy's tenure. On investigation it was found that the alloy was brittle enough to have cracked, even within the thickness of the copper plates of the firebox. Previously the boiler had given trouble with leaks from its stays, probably from early cracking, and where the heads of the stay had been hammered to caulk this, this had caused the heads of the stays to crack. The size of the firebox waterspace was also criticised, although this was due to Aspinall's standard boilers, rather than Hoy's construction. A waterspace of only 2 1/2 inches (64 mm) was narrow, but not unique for contemporary practice. The L&Y did though make it a policy to provide a waterspace of 4 inches after this, even at the cost of a reduction in grate area.

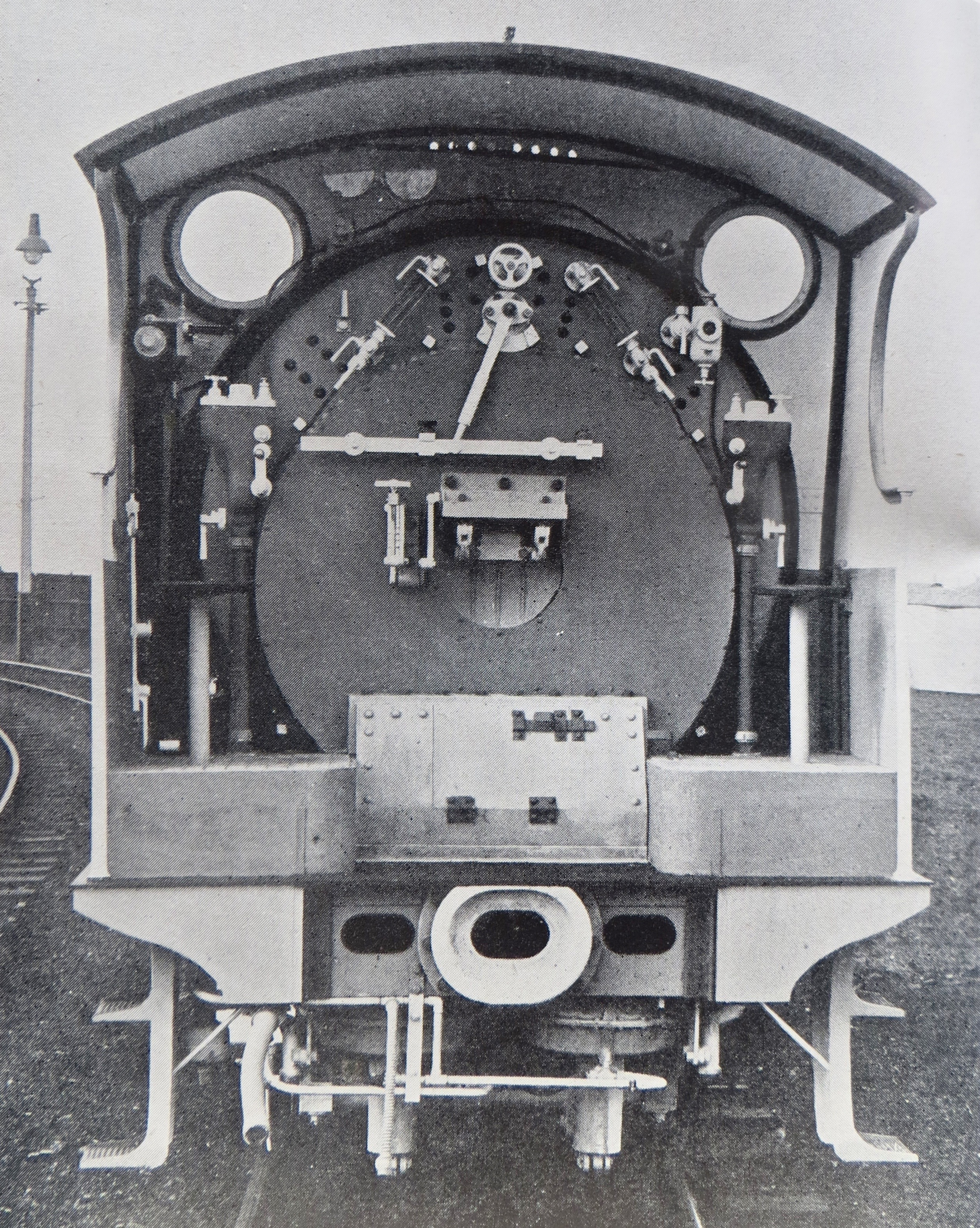
Backhead of a class 30, showing the large circular firebox

Hoy sought to avoid the problems of the stayed firebox altogether and so developed an alternative boiler and firebox for the Class 30. This used a corrugated tubular furnace and cylindrical outer firebox, as for the Lentz boiler. The furnace was also of steel, rather than the copper used for fireboxes at this time. One, no. 396, was rebuilt in 1903 and 20 more were built new with this boiler. The new boiler design did not last long in service and the locomotives were rebuilt with conventional boilers after ten years. (Note: The eight to ten-year interval before rebuilding would be a typical service life for such a boiler. It indicates that the boilers were adequate, and were not withdrawn from service merely to replace them, but also that the experiment was not considered a success and so they were not continued with.) Hoy's successor, George Hughes, described these boilers unfavourably in papers read to the I. Mech E.

=== Beyer Peacock ===
In 1904 Hoy resigned from the L&YR to become general manager of Beyer, Peacock and Company in Manchester. He was replaced by George Hughes. There he reorganised the works, but died on 24 May 1910.

== Patents ==
- GB190311837, published 31 December 1903, Improvements in bogie trucks for rolling stock
- GB190406820, published 17 November 1904, Improvements in safety valves
- GB190511874, (with Beyer Peacock), published 8 March 1906, Improvements in boilers
- GB190600945, published 12 April 1906, Improvements in means for applying chills for hardening and toughening the interior surfaces of cylinders, tubes and the like

Preceded by John Aspinall	Chief Mechanical Engineer of the Lancashire and Yorkshire Railway; 1899–1904	Succeeded by George Hughes
