= L&YR Class 3 =

British steam locomotive class (1891–1930)

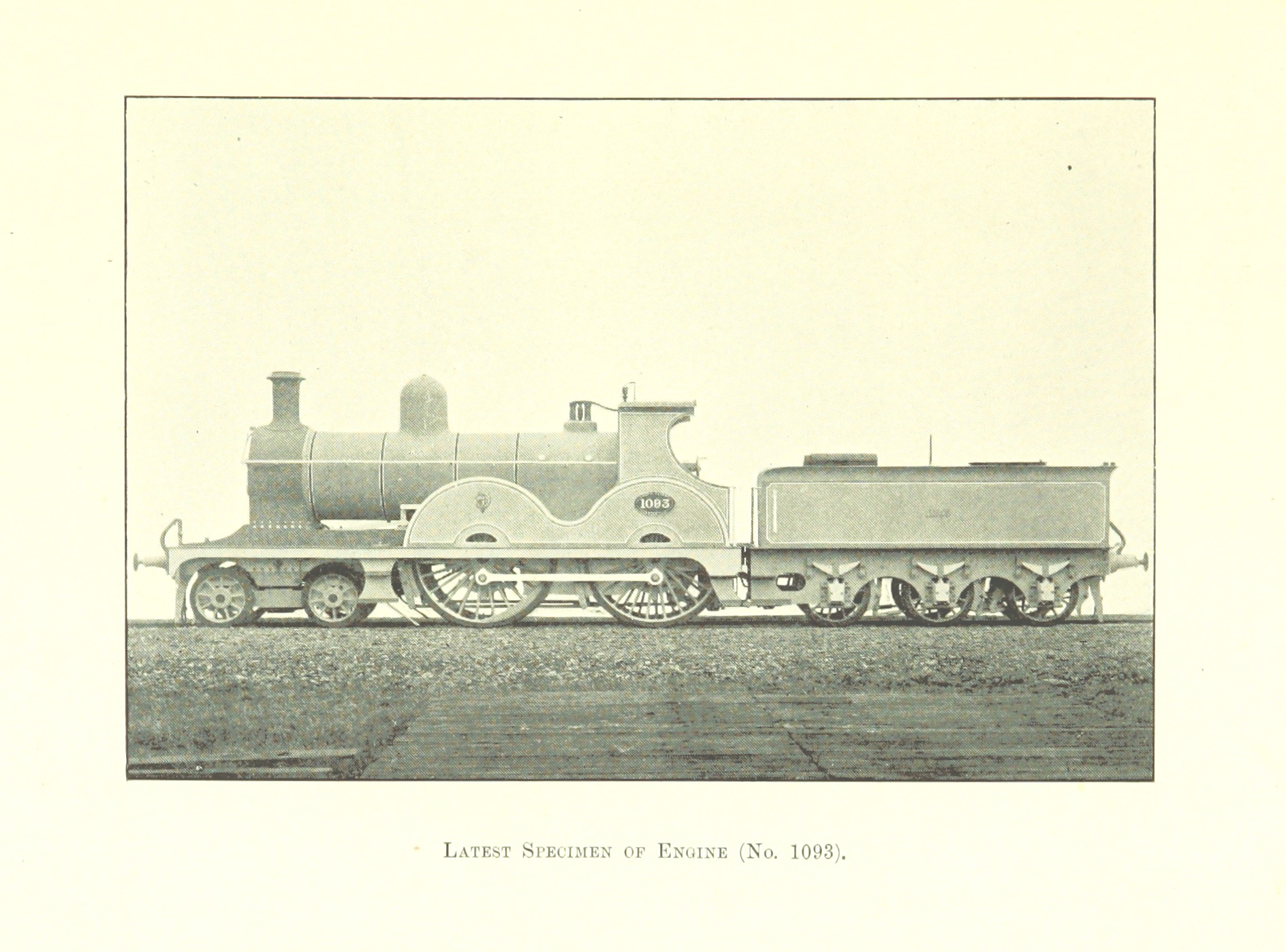
- No. 1093 in photographic paint
Type and origin
- Power type: Steam
- Designer: John Aspinall
- Build date: 1891-1894
- Total produced: 40
Specifications
- Configuration
  - Whyte: 4-4-0
- Gauge: 4 ft 8 1/2 in (1,435 mm)
- Driver dia.: 7 ft 3 in (2.210 m)
- Loco weight: 44.8 long tons (45.5 t)
- Fuel type: Coal
- Boiler pressure: 180 psi (1.24 MPa)
- Cylinders: 2
- Cylinder size: 18 in × 26 in (457 mm × 660 mm)
- Valve gear: Joy
Performance figures
- Tractive effort: 14,814 lbf (65.9 kN)
Career
- Operators: L&YR, LMS
- Power class: LMS 2P
- Withdrawn: 1925-1930
- Disposition: All scrapped

L&YR Class 4
Type and origin
- Power type: Steam
- Designer: George Hughes
- Rebuild date: 1908-1909
- Number rebuilt: 6
Specifications
- Configuration
  - Whyte: 4-4-0
- Gauge: 4 ft 8 1/2 in (1,435 mm)
- Driver dia.: 7 ft 3 in (2.210 m)
- Loco weight: 48.75 long tons (49.53 t)
- Fuel type: Coal
- Boiler pressure: 180 psi (1.24 MPa)
- Cylinders: 2
- Cylinder size: 19 in × 26 in (483 mm × 660 mm) or 20 in × 26 in (508 mm × 660 mm)
- Valve gear: Joy or Walschaerts
Performance figures
- Tractive effort: 17,576 lbf (78.2 kN) (19"); 18,290 lbf (81.4 kN) (20")
Career
- Operators: L&YR, LMS
- Power class: LMS 3P
- Withdrawn: 1925-1926
- Disposition: All scrapped

The L&YR Class 3 was a class of 4-4-0 steam locomotives of the Lancashire and Yorkshire Railway introduced in 1891 with forty being built. George Hughes rebuilt six locomotives with superheaters between 1908 and 1909, they were later designated L&YR Class 4. All passed to the London, Midland and Scottish Railway at the grouping in 1923 but were withdrawn by 1930.

== Design ==
=== Origins ===
The design originated with a William Barton Wright's 4-4-0 of 1880 with driving wheels of 6 feet 0 inches (1.83 m) and boiler pressure of 140 psi (0.97 MPa). Aspinall then produced a modified version with 6ft wheels which was the basis for the class 3.

=== Class 3 ===
John Aspinall succeeded Barton Wright in 1886. He initially ordered more locomotives of Barton's Wright's 4-4-0 design. but determined a driving wheels of 7 feet 3 inches (2.21 m) and boiler pressure increased to 160 psi (1.10 MPa) should give increased speed for the same tractive effort.

=== Class 4 ===
Six locomotives were rebuilt with superheaters by George Hughes between 1908 and 1909. They became L&YR Class 4 in the Hughes classification scheme introduced in 1919. All six passed to the London, Midland and Scottish Railway at the grouping in 1923.

There were two different versions of the rebuild. One had 19" bore cylinders and Joy valve gear. The other had 20" bore cylinders and Walschaerts valve gear.

== Numbering ==
The L&YR numbered them 1093-1229 and then randomly, using numbers between 318 and 498. The LMS numbered its 34 Class 3 locomotives 10150-10183. The six which had been rebuilt to Class 4 were numbered in a separate series, LMS 10190-10195.

=== Class 4 numbering ===
L&YR no.	LMS no.	Cylinders
1112	10190	19"
1110	10191	20"
1104	10192	20"
1098	10193	20"
1105	10194	20"
455	10195	19"

== Withdrawal ==
Withdrawals began in 1925 and the Class 4 superheated locomotives were all withdrawn by 1926. The last members of the type were withdrawn and scrapped in 1930.

== Bibliography ==
- Bulleid, H.A.V. (1967). The Aspinall Era. Ian Allan Ltd.
- Casserley, H.C.; Johnston, S.W. (1966). Locomotives at the Grouping, no.3, LMS. Ian Allan.
- Marshall, John (1972). The Lancashire & Yorkshire Railway, volume 3. Newton Abbot: David & Charles. ISBN 0-7153-5320-9.
