= GS&WR Class 2 =

Great Southern & Western Railway Class 2
Type and origin
- Power type: Steam
- Designer: Alexander McDonnell
- Builder: Inchicore Works
- Build date: 1877–1880
- Total produced: 12
Specifications
- Configuration
  - Whyte: 4-4-0
  - UIC: 2′B n2
- Gauge: 5 ft 3 in (1,600 mm)
- Leading dia.: 3 ft 0 in (0.914 m)
- Driver dia.: 5 ft 8 1/2 in (1.740 m)
- Axle load: 10 long tons 12 cwt (23,700 lb or 10.8 t)
- Adhesive weight: 20 long tons 12 cwt (46,100 lb or 20.9 t)
- Loco weight: 34 long tons 10 cwt (77,300 lb or 35.1 t)
- Boiler pressure: 150 psi (1.03 MPa)
- Cylinders: Two
- Cylinder size: 16 in × 20 in (406 mm × 508 mm)
Performance figures
- Tractive effort: 9,530 lbf (42.39 kN)
Career
- Operators: GS&WR → GSR → CIÉ
- Class: GS&WR: 2 GSR/CIÉ: 2 or D19
- Number in class: 12
- Nicknames: Kerry Bogies
- Withdrawn: 1953
- Disposition: All scrapped

The GS&WR Class 2 was a lightweight 4-4-0 steam locomotive used by the Great Southern and Western Railway in Ireland in the late 19th and in the first half of the 20th century. They were the first locomotives of type 4-4-0 in Ireland.

Many Irish branch lines, some very long, were lightly laid and needed special locomotives to work the trains. With a locomotive weight just of 34 1/2 long tons (35.1 t; 38.6 short tons) and maximum axle load of just over 10 long tons (10 t; 11 short tons), the GS&WR Class 2 was a most successful type fulfilling these requirements.

== History ==
This class of 4-4-0 locomotives was designed by Alexander McDonnell, the Locomotive Superintendent of the GS&WR, and built between 1877 and 1880. The locomotives were intended for light branch line work and they made their mark on the lightly laid Kerry line, gaining the name "Kerry Bogies" although they were also used on the Cork to Youghal line and as an assisting engine on the steeply graded (1 in 60 / 1.7 %) section of the main line from Glanmire to Blarney, this latter work taxing their capabilities to the limit.

Mechanically they were the first bogie locomotives to have used the American principle of the "swing-link" bogie where hinged links control the truck's lateral (sideways) movement.

== Development ==
Many changes took place during the long life of these locomotives, which lasted almost to the end of steam traction on the Córas Iompair Éireann (CIÉ). The boiler and firebox arrangement was the largest and most obvious change. As built the locomotives had a McDonnell raised round top firebox but this was replaced over the years by the Belpaire 'U' types, all members of the class being converted by 1950. Chimneys and smokeboxes were also changed. The original cab, described as "abbreviated", offered little protection for the crew, and was replaced.

The tender was a six-wheel design with flaired top and was of rivetted construction.

In 1925 the Great Western and Southern Railway became part of Great Southern Railways. The locomotives retained their GS&WR numbers and class, but gained an additional classification of Class D19.

Most were rebuilt with a belpaire firebox in the 1930s but No. 46 was withdrawn unrebuilt in 1935. CIÉ withdrew most of the remainder between 1945 and 1953 noting that while the type was "quite a good design for a light engine" the demand for such a type was decreasing.

== Livery ==
Originally lined black, until around 1918 when the Great Southern and Western Railway introduced its long-lived standard all-over unlined battleship-grey livery. This lasted past the Great Southern Railways amalgamation, and into the CIÉ era. In latter CIÉ days, the only change was that pale yellow painted numerals on cabsides replaced earlier GSWR style cast number plates. A few older CIÉ 4-4-0s were treated to the 1950s lined green livery — but no locomotives of this class were among them.
