= LNWR Newton Class =

Locomotives built in the 19th century

LNWR Newton class
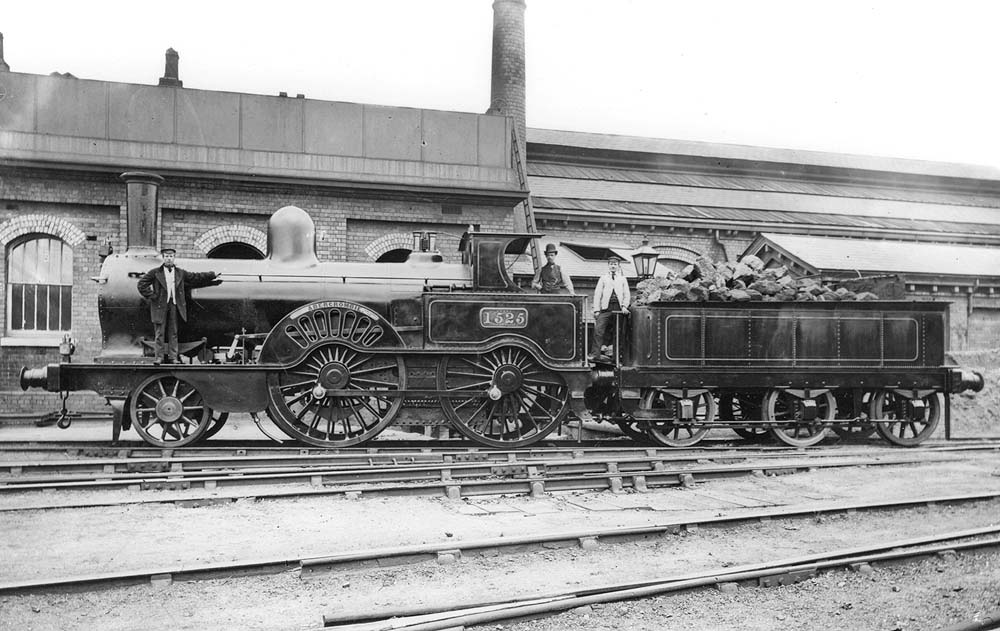
- LNWR 1525 Abercrombie at Monument Lane loco depot
Type and origin
- Power type: Steam
- Designer: John Ramsbottom
- Builder: Crewe Works
- Serial number: 920–929, 980–999, 1160–1179, 1280–1289, 1300–1309, 1380–1385, 1479–1488, 1682–1691
- Build date: April 1866 – August 1873
- Total produced: 96 (LNWR); 10 (L&YR)
Specifications
- Configuration
  - Whyte: 2-4-0
  - UIC: 1B n2
- Gauge: 4 ft 8 1/2 in (1,435 mm)
- Leading dia.: 3 ft 9 in (1.143 m)
- Driver dia.: 6 ft 9 in (2.057 m)
- Tender wheels: 3 ft 9 in (1.143 m)
- Wheelbase
  - Engine: 15 ft 8 in (4.775 m)
  - Leading: 7 ft 5 in (2.261 m)
  - Coupled: 8 ft 3 in (2.515 m)
- Loco weight: 29 long tons (29 t)
- Water cap.: 1,500 imp gal (6,800 L; 1,800 US gal)
- Firebox
  - Grate area: 15 sq ft (1.4 m^{2})
- Boiler
  - Diameter: 4 ft 0 3/16 in (1.224 m)
  - Tube plates: 10 ft 6 in (3.200 m)
- Boiler pressure: 140 lbf/in^{2} (970 kPa)
- Heating surface: 1,099 sq ft (102.1 m^{2})
- Cylinders: Two, inside
- Cylinder size: 17 in × 24 in (432 mm × 610 mm)
Performance figures
- Tractive effort: 10,190 lbf (45.33 kN)
Career
- Operators: London and North Western Railway
- Scrapped: November 1880 - January 1894
- Disposition: All scrapped

The LNWR Newton Class was a class of ninety-six 2-4-0 steam locomotives built by the London and North Western Railway at their Crewe Works between 1866 and 1873.

They were officially designated Curved Link 6-ft 6-in Passenger due to the use of a curved link between the fore and back eccentric rods of their Stephenson valve gear and the use of 6-foot-6-inch (1.981 m) diameter wheel centres, which, together with 1 1/2-inch (38 mm) thick tyres gave a driving wheel diameter of 6 ft 9 in (2.057 m).

They were designed by John Ramsbottom who had 76 built, all without cabs and with pierced driving wheel splashers. Ramsbottom's successor F. W. Webb, built twenty more, all with cabs. The earlier locomotives also gained cabs, and all eventually had the splashers filled in.

All were 'renewed' (replaced) by a like number of LNWR Improved Precedent Class between 1887 and 1894.

== Fleet list ==
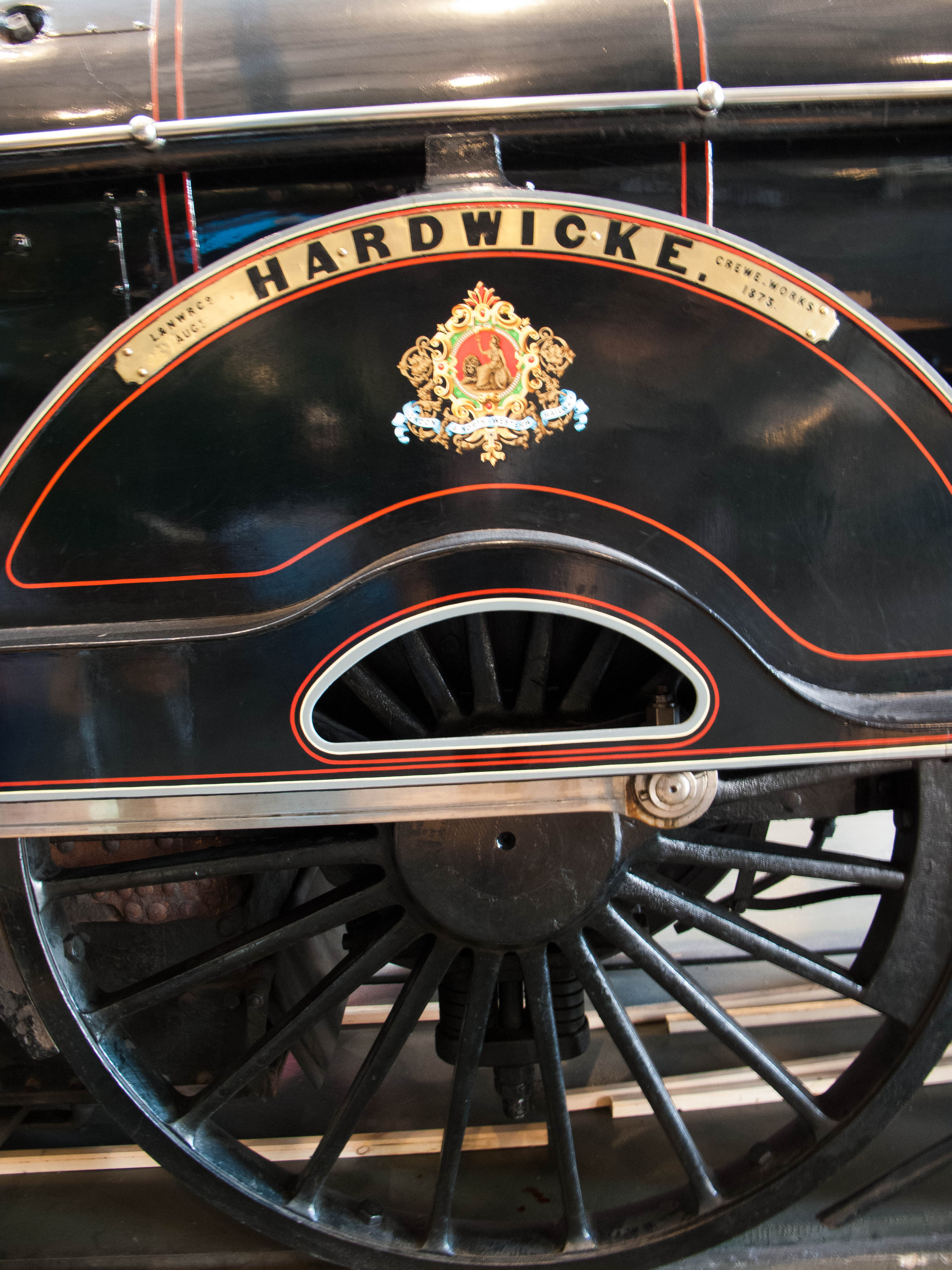
Nameplate of LNWR No. 790 Hardwicke at National Railway Museum still displaying the original year of build of the 'renewed' Newton.

Table of locomotives
LNWR No.	Name	Crewe Works No.	Date built	Date scrapped	Notes
1480	Newton	920	April 1866	November 1888	
1481	The Duke of Edinburgh	921	June 1866	October 1888	Was to have been named Franklin
1482	Herschel	922	May 1866	January 1890	
1483	Newcomen	923	May 1866	March 1890	
1484	Telford	924	May 1866	November 1890	
1485	Smeaton	925	May 1866	December 1887	
1486	Dalton	926	May 1866	March 1890	
1487	Faraday	927	May 1866	June 1887	
1488	Murdoch	928	May 1866	November 1888	
1489	Brindley	929	May 1866	April 1893	
1513	Shakespeare	980	October 1866	February 1890	
1514	Scott	981	October 1866	November 1890	
1515	Milton	982	October 1866	May 1890	
1516	Byron	983	November 1866	June 1891	
1517	Princess Helena	984	November 1866	November 1888	
1518	Countess	985	November 1866	May 1891	
1519	Duchess	986	November 1866	June 1891	
1520	Franklin	987	November 1866	May 1891	
1521	Gladstone	988	November 1866	September 1889	
1522	Pitt	989	November 1866	January 1888	
1523	Marlborough	990	November 1866	April 1893	
1524	Wolfe	991	November 1866	March 1890	
1525	Abercrombie	992	November 1866	May 1891	
1526	Drake	993	November 1866	January 1890	
1527	Raleigh	994	November 1866	February 1888	
1528	Frobisher	995	November 1866	February 1888	
1529	Cook	996	November 1866	September 1889	
1530	Columbus	997	November 1866	November 1888	
1531	Cromwell	998	November 1866	November 1890	
1532	Hampden	999	November 1866	June 1892	
1666	Ariadne	1160	March 1868	June 1891	
1667	Corunna	1161	March 1868	April 1893	
1668	Dagmar	1162	March 1868	May 1891	
1669	Ilion	1163	March 1868	March 1888	
1670	Ganymede	1164	March 1868	June 1887	
1671	Shamrock	1165	March 1868	June 1891	
1672	Talavera	1166	March 1868	February 1890	
1673	Lucknow	1167	April 1868	May 1891	
1674	Delhi	1168	April 1868	November 1890	
1675	Vimiera	1169	April 1868	May 1891	
1676	The Nile	1170	April 1868	May 1891	
1677	Badajos	1171	April 1868	January 1890	
1678	Airey	1172	April 1868	April 1892	
1679	Bunsen	1173	April 1868	January 1888	
1680	Livingstone	1174	May 1868	June 1891	
1681	Minerva	1175	May 1868	February 1888	
1682	Novelty	1176	May 1868	June 1892	
1683	Sisyphus	1177	May 1868	April 1891	
1684	Speke	1178	May 1868	June 1891	
1685	Gladiator	1179	May 1868	November 1880	
1744	Magdala	1280	October 1869	April 1892	
1745	John Bright	1281	October 1869	April 1892	
1746	Bevere	1282	November 1869	January 1890	
1747	Tennyson	1283	November 1869	May 1891	John Mayall from 1885
1748	Britannia	1284	November 1869	July 1889	
1749	Hibernia	1285	November 1869	January 1888	
379	Sedgwick	1286	December 1869	October 1888	
380	Quernmore	1287	December 1869	June 1891	
381	Patterdale	1288	December 1869	April 1893	
382	Buckingham	1289	January 1870	May 1890	
393	Brougham	1300	August 1870	April 1893	
394	Eamont	1301	August 1870	April 1893	
395	Scotia	1302	September 1870	June 1892	
396	Dunrobin	1303	September 1870	April 1891	Tennyson from 1885
271	Minotaur	1304	September 1870	June 1887	
275	Vulcan	1305	September 1870	January 1888	
276	Pluto	1306	September 1870	November 1888	
295	Penmaenmawr	1307	September 1870	April 1893	
304	Hector	1308	September 1870	June 1892	
308	Booth	1309	September 1870	May 1890	
2001	Henry Crosfield	1380	April 1871	November 1890	
2002	Madge	1381	April 1871	June 1891	
2003	Alecto	1382	April 1871	June 1891	
2004	Witch	1383	April 1871	May 1891	
2005	Lynx	1384	April 1871	January 1894	
2006	Princess	1385	April 1871	November 1890	
1211	John Ramsbottom	1479	March 1872	November 1888	
1212	Pioneer	1480	March 1872	November 1888	
1213	The Queen	1481	April 1872	January 1892	
1214	Prince Albert	1482	April 1872	November 1890	
1215	Albion	1483	April 1872	April 1893	
1216	Premier	1484	April 1872	November 1888	
1217	Florence	1485	April 1872	April 1891	
1218	Phaeton	1486	April 1872	November 1890	
1219	Lightning	1487	April 1872	January 1888	
1220	Belted Will	1488	April 1872	June 1887	
1141	S. R. Graves	1682	1873	November 1888	
941	Blenkinsop	1683	August 1873	October 1888	
942	Shah of Persia	1684	August 1873	April 1893	
974	Richard Cobden	1685	August 1873	January 1890	
696	Director	1686	August 1873	November 1888	
787	Clarendon	1687	August 1873	April 1893	
790	Hardwicke	1688	August 1873	January 1892	
1020	Wordsworth	1689	August 1873	May 1891	
1132	North Western	1690	August 1873	June 1887	
403	Isabella	1691	August 1873	January 1892	

== Lancashire & Yorkshire Railway ==
In 1873 ten locomotives of the type were built at Crewe for the Lancashire and Yorkshire Railway (L&YR) and utilised on passenger expresses between Blackpool, Manchester and Yorkshire. They were given the numbers 456–462 and 731–733. Most were fitted with replacement boilers about and other standard L&YR parts 1888. They were then used on Liverpool−Manchester expresses on the new L&YR route. The more powerful Barton Wright 4-4-0s took over on the more demanding sections to Yorkshire though the Ramsbottom engines were considered faster on light loads. Most were withdrawn in the period 1895 to 1897 but Nos. 461, 462 and 731 lasted to 1904, 1912 and 1926 respectively. No. 731 had been used as the Chief Mechanical Engineer's (CME) locomotive since 1886, based at Horwich and attached to a combined bogied tender-saloon vehicle. It passed back to the LNWR when the L&YR amalgamation of 1922 and into the London Midland and Scottish Railway (LMS) in 1923 at the grouping. It was scrapped when the LMS CME department moved to Derby.

== Preservation ==
Even though no locomotive from the Newton class was saved for posterity, their legacy is still carried on via a nameplate of one of their succeeding designs. The Improved Precedent No. 790 (later LMS No. 5031 Hardwicke (built April 1892 and withdrawn February 1932) currently sitting at the National Railway Museum Shildon still display nameplates indicating 1873 as the year of build.
