= L&YR Class 30 =

British steam locomotive class (1900–1950)

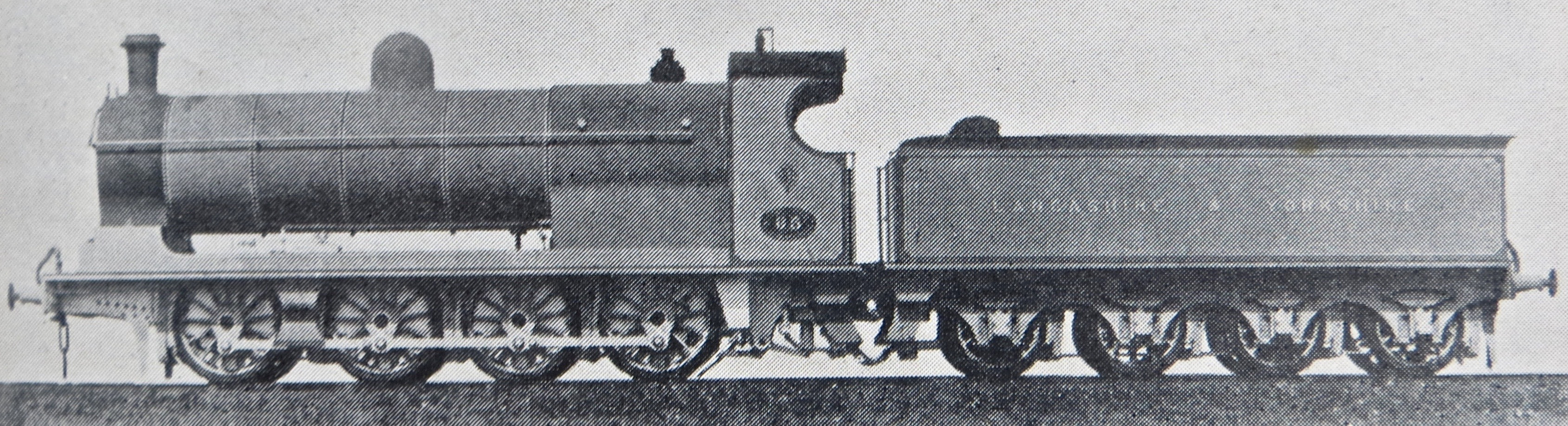
- L&YR 0-8-0 Class 30 with standard Belpaire boiler
Type and origin
- Power type: Steam
- Designer: Aspinall
- Build date: 1900-1908
- Total produced: 60
Specifications
- Configuration
  - Whyte: 0-8-0
- Gauge: 4 ft 8 1/2 in (1,435 mm)
- Driver dia.: 4 ft 6 in (1.372 m)
- Loco weight: 53.8 long tons (54.7 t)
- Fuel type: Coal
- Boiler pressure: 175 psi (1.21 MPa)
- Cylinders: Two, inside
- Cylinder size: 20 in × 26 in (508 mm × 660 mm)
- Valve gear: Joy
Performance figures
- Tractive effort: 28,644 lbf (127.4 kN)
Career
- Operators: L&YR, LMS, BR
- Power class: LMS 5F
- Nicknames: Sea Pigs
- Withdrawn: 1926-1950
- Disposition: All scrapped

The L&YR Class 30 was a class of 0-8-0 steam locomotives of the Lancashire and Yorkshire Railway. The class was designed by John Aspinall and introduced in 1900.

== Hoy locomotives ==
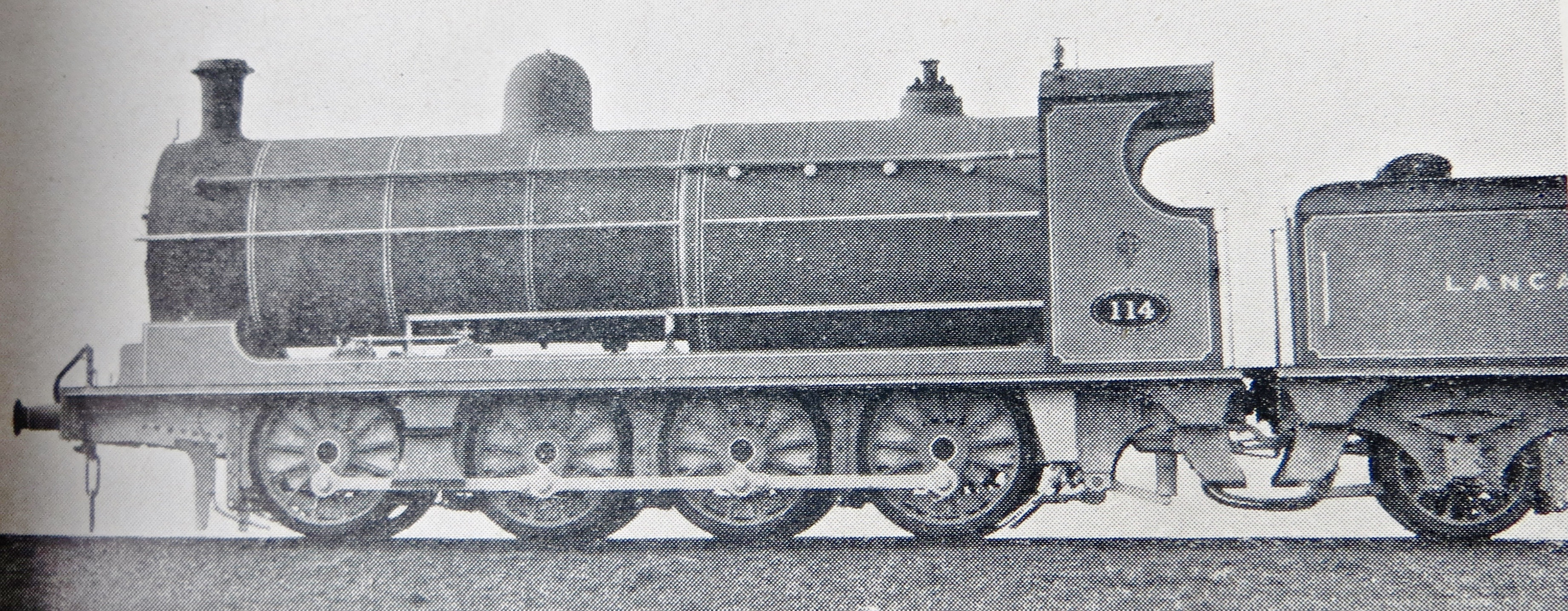
No. 114 built at Horwich with a cylindrical firebox, longer than the original type

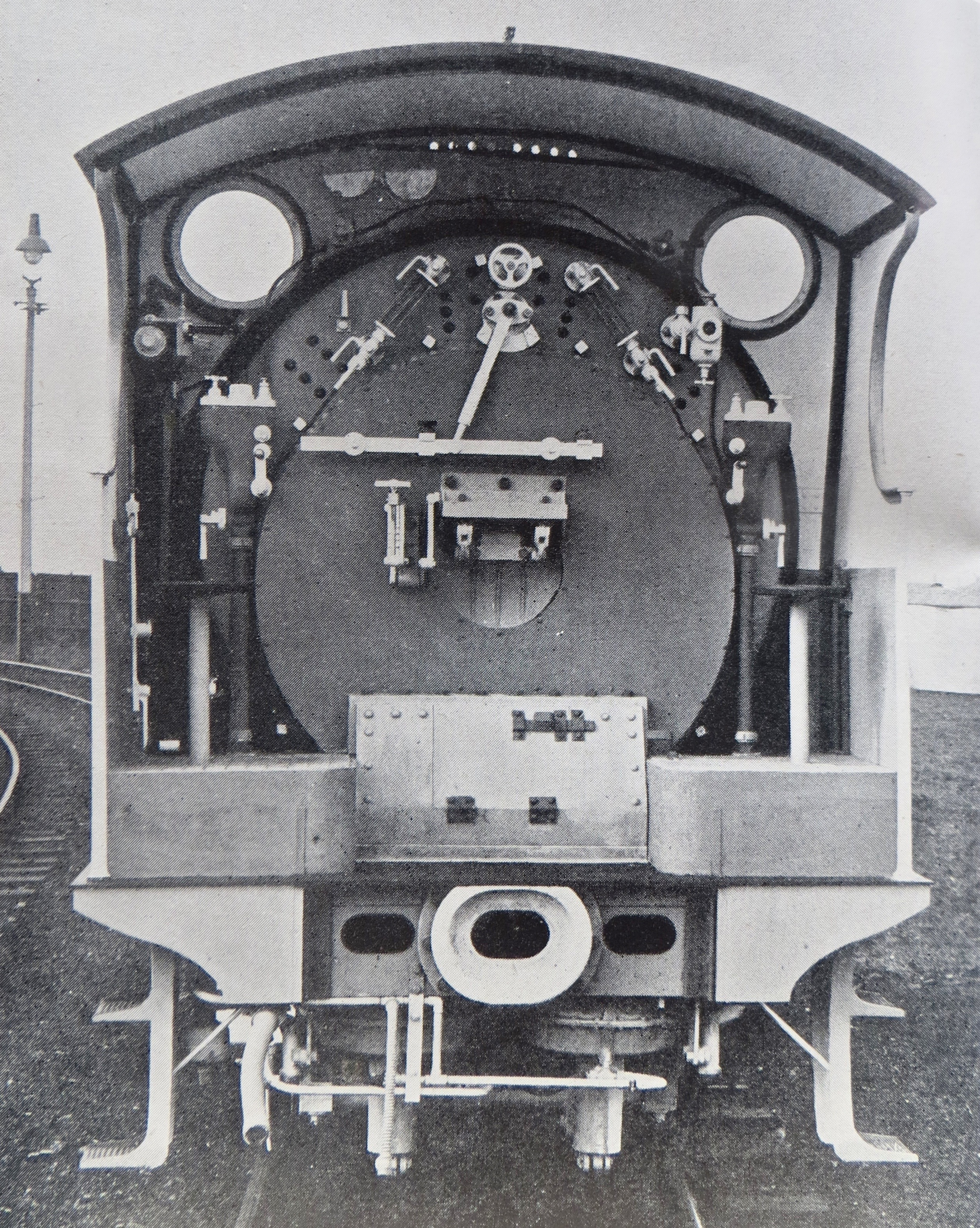
Footplate view of cylindrical firebox

Twenty of the class, built in 1903, were fitted with Henry Hoy's cylindrical firebox with a corrugated steel inner furnace, inspired by contemporary textile mill boiler practice in the area. The inner furnace was designed to be stiff enough, owing to the corrugations, to avoid the need for stays. This was not a great success (the internal flue deformed under steam pressure and water circulation was poor) and they were later rebuilt with conventional boilers between 1911 and 1914. Crews referred to them as "Sea Pigs" which implies they were not well liked.

== Numbering ==
A total of 60 locomotives were built, all of which passed to the London, Midland and Scottish Railway (LMS) in 1923. The LMS numbered them 12700-12759 and gave them the power classification 5F. By 1948, British Railways (BR) inherited only one surviving locomotive: LMS No. 12727 (L&YR No. 1433), which was renumbered 52727.

== Withdrawal ==
The first locomotive was withdrawn in 1926 and the last in 1950. None were preserved.
