= John Aspinall (engineer) =

British locomotive engineer

Sir John Aspinall
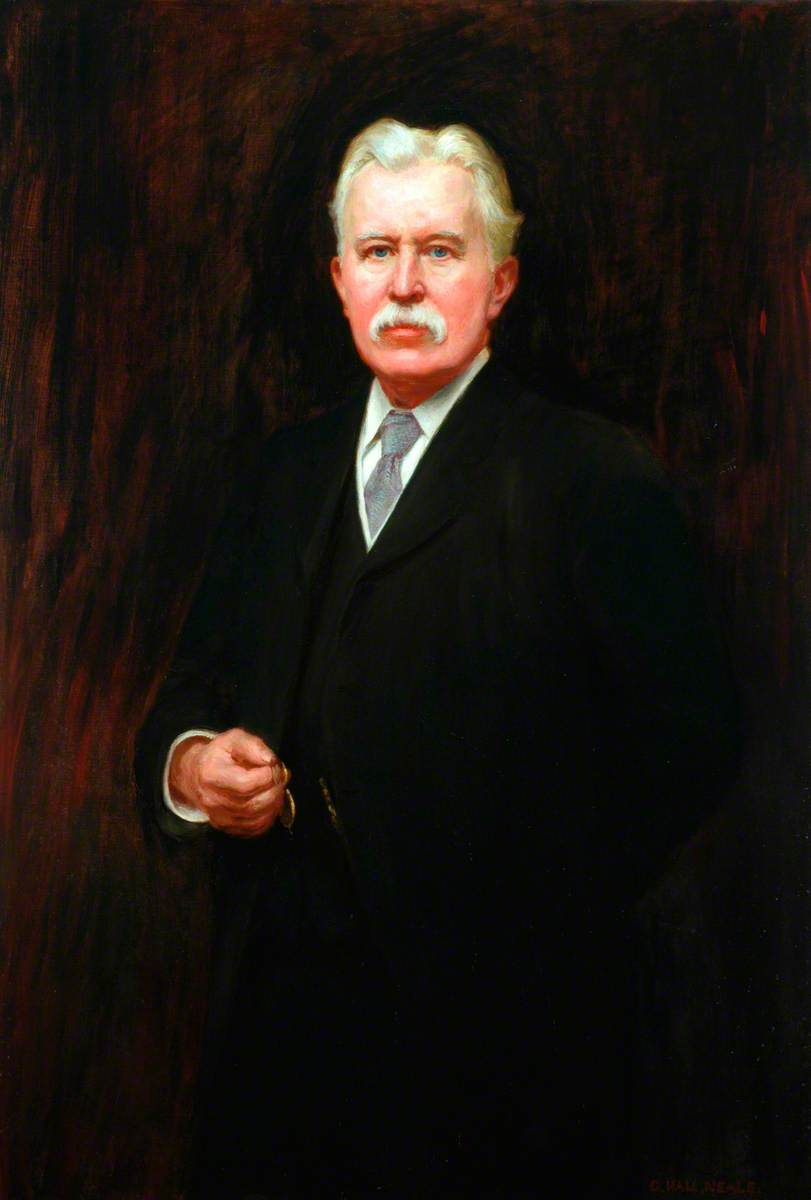
- Aspinall by George Hall Neale, c. 1920
- Born: 25 August 1851; Liverpool, England
- Died: 19 January 1937 (aged 85)
- Engineering career
- Discipline: Civil, Mechanical
- Institutions: Institution of Civil Engineers (president), Institution of Mechanical Engineers (president)

Sir John Audley Frederick Aspinall (25 August 1851 – 19 January 1937) was an English mechanical engineer who served as Locomotive Superintendent of the Great Southern and Western Railway (GS&WR) of Ireland and Lancashire and Yorkshire Railway (L&YR) of England. He introduced vacuum brakes to his locomotives in Ireland, a trend which was followed in Britain, and designed several locomotives. He was also president of the Institution of Mechanical Engineers and of the Institution of Civil Engineers.

== Biography ==
Aspinall was born on 25 August 1851 in Liverpool to a Roman Catholic judge. He attended the Roman Catholic boarding school of Beaumont College, Berkshire before being apprenticed to engineers John Ramsbottom and Francis Webb of the London and North Western Railway in 1868. He was sent by Webb to the United States of America in 1872 where he was greatly impressed by the larger loading gauge in use there.

In 1875, he moved to the Great Southern and Western Railway of Ireland and became their works manager at Inchicore, Dublin. Aspinall was promoted to Locomotive Superintendent in 1883 and introduced a form of vacuum braking to his locomotives which was soon adopted by several other lines, including the London and North Western and Great Northern Railways. He was succeeded at Inchicore by Henry Ivatt and was to keep links with both Inchicore and Ivatt.

He became the Chief Mechanical Engineer of the Lancashire and Yorkshire Railway in 1886. Continuing the work of his predecessor, William Barton Wright, he modernised the locomotive stock and continued Barton Wright's philosophy of standardisation, bringing in several of his own design. He was promoted to L&YR general manager in 1899, a position he was to hold until 1919. In this capacity he introduced electrification and greatly expanded the transport of coal.

Aspinall served as president of the Institution of Mechanical Engineers between 1909 and 1910 and was interned in Germany at the outbreak of the First World War in 1914. Aspinall received a knighthood on 13 June 1917 for his contributions to the war effort and national transport system. He served as president of the Institution of Civil Engineers between November 1918 and November 1919. Aspinall also conducted the inquiry into the Sevenoaks railway accident. He was the first recipient of the Institution of Mechanical Engineers' James Watt International Medal, receiving it in 1937.

He died on 19 January 1937. His son, John, was a barrister and first-class cricketer.

He wrote seven academic papers and was the holder of fourteen patents.

== Locomotive designs ==
- GS&WR Classes 52 and 60, classes of 4-4-0 passenger locomotive serving the period 1883 to 1960.
- L&YR Class 2 and Class 3, two designs of 4-4-0 steam locomotive.
- L&YR Class 5, a class of 270 steam tank locomotives with a 2-4-2T wheel arrangement.
- L&YR Class 7, a class of 40 steam passenger locomotives built between 1899 and 1902 with a 4-4-2 wheel arrangement.
- L&YR Class 21, class of small 0-4-0ST steam locomotives for shunting duties.
- L&YR Class 23, a class of 0-6-0ST steam locomotive used for shunting and for short-trip freight working, originally by William Barton Wright, rebuilt by Aspinall.
- L&YR Class 27, a class of 0-6-0 steam locomotive designed for freight work.
- L&YR Class 30, a class of 0-8-0 steam locomotives, designed by Aspinall, built under Hoy.

== See also ==
- Locomotives of the Lancashire and Yorkshire Railway

Professional and academic associations
Preceded by Tom Hurry Riches	President of the Institution of Mechanical Engineers; 1909–1910	Succeeded by Edward B. Ellington
Preceded by Harry Edward Jones	President of the Institution of Civil Engineers; November 1918 – November 1919	Succeeded by John Griffith
Business positions
Preceded by Alexander McDonnell	Locomotive Superintendent of the Great Southern and Western Railway; 1883–1886	Succeeded by Henry Ivatt
Preceded by Locomotive Superintendent of the Lancashire and Yorkshire Railway; W. Barton Wright	Chief Mechanical Engineer of the Lancashire and Yorkshire Railway; 1886–1899	Succeeded by Henry Hoy
Preceded by J. H. Stafford	General Manager of the Lancashire and Yorkshire Railway; 1899–1919	Succeeded by Arthur Watson
