= James the Red Engine =

Fictional steam locomotive

- The Railway Series and Thomas & Friends character
- Model used in series 8-10 of the television series
- First appearance: Thomas the Tank Engine (1946)
- Created by: Wilbert Awdry
- Designed by: George Hughes (in-universe); Reginald Payne
- Voiced by: British: Keith Wickham (2009–2017); Rob Rackstraw (2017–2021); Luke Marty (2021–2022); Tom Dussek (2022–2025); American: Kerry Shale (2009–2015); Rob Rackstraw (2015–2021); Luke Marty (2021–2025); Other: Susan Roman (Thomas and the Magic Railroad, final cut); Michael Angelis (original workprints); Adrian Egan (original workprints); Edward Glen (original workprints); Kevin Duhaney (original workprints, cut 8 only); Phil Fehrle (original workprints); Neil Crone (original workprints, cut 12 only); Nigel Pilkington (2027-present)

In-universe information
- Species: Steam locomotive

James the Red Engine is a fictional character from the British children's books, The Railway Series, created by Wilbert Awdry. He is an anthropomorphic tender locomotive, and is the number 5 engine on the North Western Railway, the Fat Controller's railway on the Island of Sodor, along with Thomas the Tank Engine, Percy the Small Engine, and Gordon the Big Engine. He also appears in the television adaptation Thomas & Friends, and other media in the franchise.

James debuted in the 1946 book Thomas the Tank Engine. Two books in the series, James the Red Engine and James and the Diesel Engines, are dedicated to James.

== Prototype and background ==
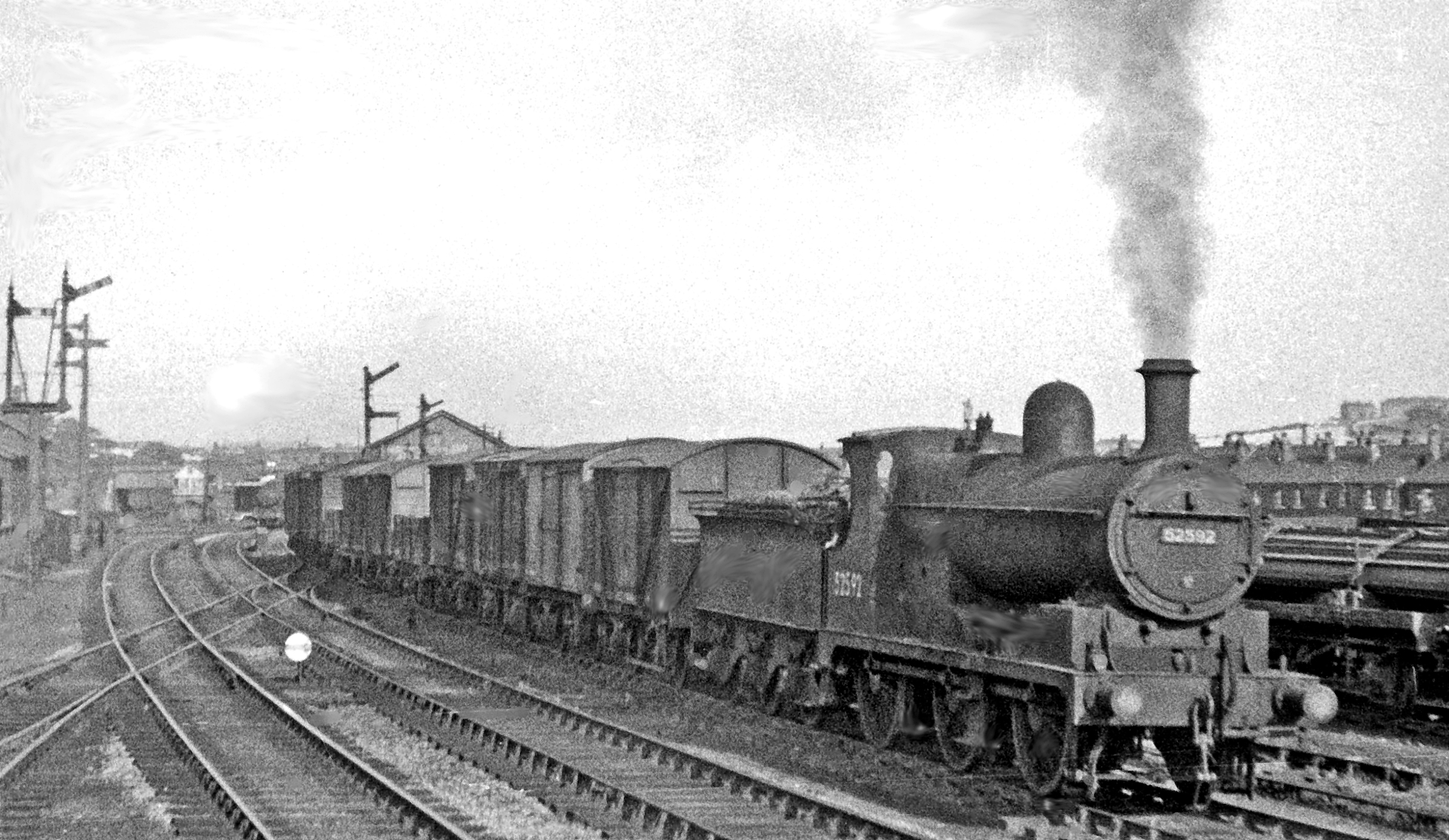
James' basis, an L&YR Class 28 in 1953

James first appeared in The Railway Series in the 1946 book Thomas the Tank Engine. He was named after James Furze, a friend of the publisher's son. He was originally painted black. At the request of the publishers, Awdry dedicated James the Red Engine to the character. James was painted red in this and subsequent books.

James is based on the L&YR Class 28, an 0-6-0 mixed-traffic tender engine designed by George Hughes and based on the earlier L&YR Class 27 designed by John Aspinall. According to Awdry, the Class 28s were powerful engines but had a tendency to be nose-heavy, especially when used as relief engines on excursion trains and driven at speed. In the book The Island of Sodor: Its People, History and Railways, Awdry gave a fictional history of the engine. James was built by Hughes as an experiment to see if the nose-heaviness could be counteracted. The locomotive was fitted with larger 5 feet 6 inches (1.68 m) driving wheels and a pony truck, making it into a 2-6-0. (The real Class 28 has 5 feet 1 inch (1.55 m) wheels.) James is also missing the prominent front sandboxes fitted to the Class 28s. The improvement was not as great as hoped for and after the grouping, the LMS sold James to the Fat Controller's North Western Railway.

=== Models ===
Awdry had two models of James on his OO gauge model railway. The first, from the 1950s, was based on a 2-6-0 Glasgow and South Western Railway locomotive, the Austrian Goods, designed by Peter Drummond; this is the design that Awdry had originally intended to use for James. The model was red with yellow lining. Despite being professionally made and "a beautiful model", the motor was unreliable, so it could not be used regularly. Awdry later noted that it was sent away in the 1980s for a new motor and chassis and came back "completely transformed".

Awdry's second model of James was based on a 1960s Tri-ang Johnson 3F 0-6-0; a conversion which Hornby used for the production version of their model of James several decades later.

== James in The Railway Series ==
James the Red Engine was the third book in the Railway Series by Reverend W. Awdry. It picked up where the previous book, Thomas The Tank Engine, left off, as James was introduced in "Thomas & The Breakdown Train", the fourth and final story in Thomas the Tank Engine, where the Troublesome Trucks pushed him into a field after his wooden brake blocks caught fire. James was rescued by Thomas and the Breakdown Train and was repainted red.

== James in Thomas & Friends ==
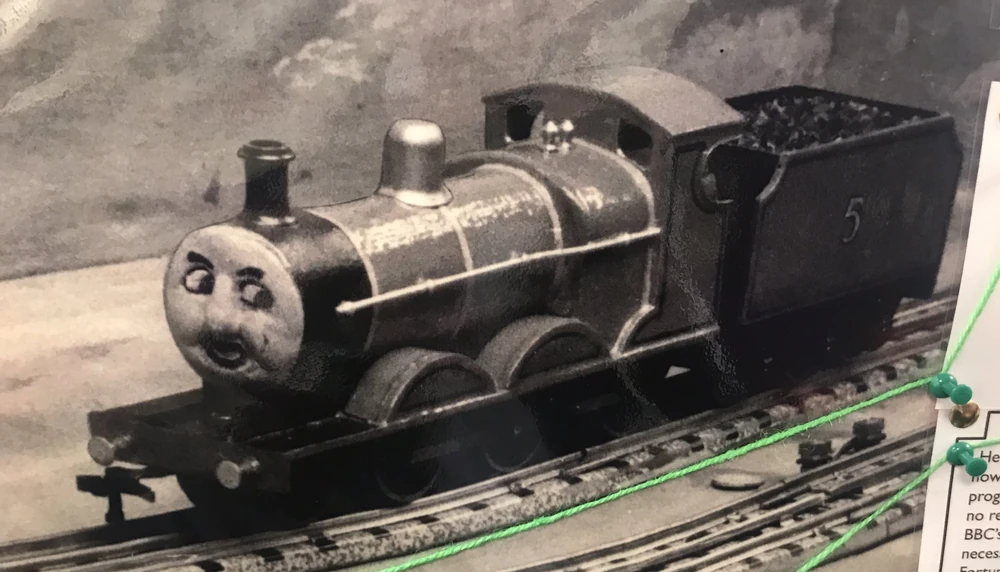
The model of James used in the lost 1953 television pilot

Unlike the books, the TV episode "Thomas and the Breakdown Train" had James in his red colour from the beginning. For unknown reasons, James also appeared in all episodes before "Thomas and the Breakdown Train" even though this story established him as being a new engine.

Like in the books, James hates getting dirty but is more vocally proud of his red paintwork, which often gets him into trouble.

James is one of only four characters that appears in every Thomas & Friends film, but only has major roles in four of them.

He is one of the leads of the 2013 film Thomas & Friends: King of the Railway, in which he, Thomas, and Percy assist in the restoration of Ulfstead Castle and the construction of the Earl of Sodor's estate.

James is the main antagonist of the 2014 film Thomas & Friends: Tale of the Brave. He pulls a prank on Percy which leads the latter to think there is a monster on the island. Feeling conflicted and guilty about his act, James initially taunts Percy before they make amends after Percy saves James from a rockslide.

Thomas & Friends: The Adventure Begins retells the first seven episodes of the show, with some alterations; most notably, James appears in his original black livery from the second book. In this version, James arrived on Sodor before Thomas and is the engine Annie and Clarabel originally belonged to. Thomas chases after the runaway James but fails to stop him and James crashes into a field. Thomas then gets the breakdown train, has James put back on the tracks, and takes him to the Steamworks. James comes back some time later, now painted in his familiar red, but finds that his two coaches have been assigned to Thomas's newly acquired branch line.

In the 2017 film Journey Beyond Sodor, Henry is prevented from taking a freight train to the mainland, so James is assigned to take his place. James has been teasing Thomas for being stuck on his branch line, so Thomas takes the train to spite him. James volunteers to go find the missing Thomas in the hope of being praised as a hero. After some investigation, he uncovers and is imprisoned in a large steelworks that Thomas had escaped from earlier and is forced to work there. He is eventually rescued by Thomas and a group of misfit experimental engines.

=== James in All Engines Go ===
In the 2021 reboot, James was brought back as a supporting character, rather than as part of the main cast as with the original series. Much like many of the other characters in the reboot, many of James' design elements and personality were altered to a more engaging dynamic towards the young engines. He does exhibit carelessness with his often-dropped cargo.

== Legacy ==
=== Awards ===
A large-scale working replica of James, along with Thomas, Percy, Gordon, Harold and Jack, was created by BBC Visual Effects for Thomas & Friends: The All Aboard Live Tour. This battery-powered locomotive is listed in the Guinness Book of Records as the "largest model railway engine" ever built, at 2.64 x 1.5 x 6.52 metres.

=== Real-life replicas ===
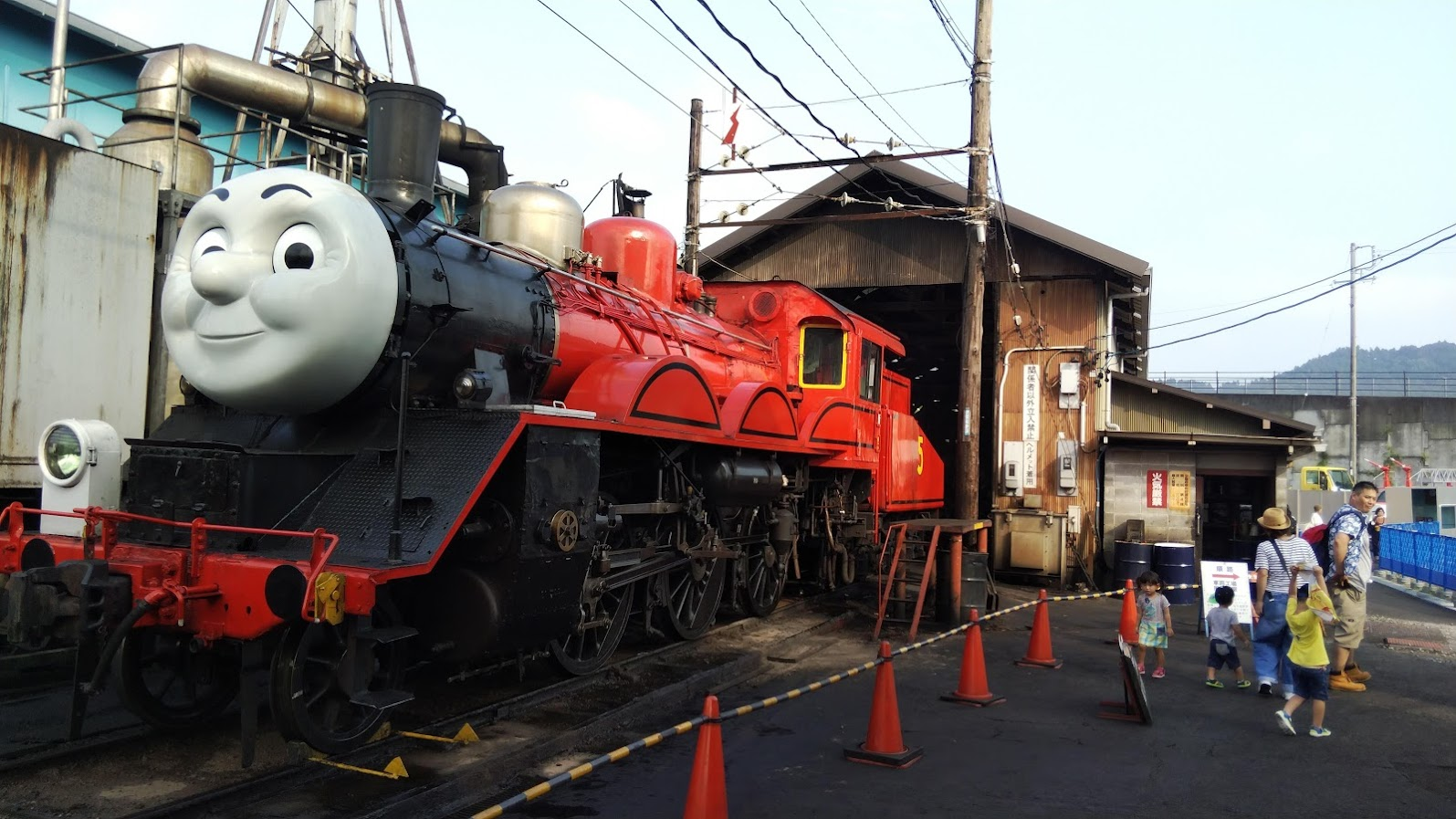
Oigawa Railway C56 44 as James

The Mid-Hants Railway repainted one of its engines – a Southern Railway N Class – into the livery of James. The engine retained this colour scheme for many years and participated in The Railway Series golden jubilee celebrations at the National Railway Museum. On the East Lancashire Railway, unrestored LMS Ivatt Class 2 Mogul No. 46428 has been painted as James the Red Engine.

The Japanese Ōigawa Railway's locomotives include five characters from the Thomas & Friends series: Thomas the Tank Engine, Hiro, Percy, James, and Rusty. The locomotives are based at Shin-Kanaya Station.
