= Thomas Land =

Thomas Land may refer to:

- Thomas Thompson Land (1815–1893), Justice of the Louisiana Supreme Court
- Thomas Land (Drayton Manor), a Thomas & Friends theme park in the United Kingdom
- Thomas Land (Fuji-Q Highland), a Thomas & Friends theme park in Japan
