= Thomas & Friends (franchise) =

Media franchise

- Logo used since 2026
- Created by: Britt Allcroft
- Owners: The Britt Allcroft Company / Gullane Entertainment (1984–2002); HIT Entertainment (2002–2012); Mattel (2012–present)
- Years: 1984–present
- Based on: The Railway Series by Wilbert Awdry

Films and television
- Films: List of films
- Television series: Thomas & Friends (1984–2021); Shining Time Station (1989–95); Thomas & Friends: All Engines Go (2021–25); Thomas & Friends: Railway Stories (2026–present)

Games
- Video games: List of video games

Miscellaneous
- Toys: List of merchandise
- Theme park attractions: Day Out with Thomas; Thomas Land (Drayton Manor); Thomas Land (Fuji-Q Highland)

Thomas & Friends (formerly known as Thomas the Tank Engine & Friends) is a children's media franchise based on the Railway Series books by Wilbert Awdry, created by Britt Allcroft in 1984, and owned by Mattel since 2012. The franchise revolves around the titular protagonist, Thomas the Tank Engine, as well as an ensemble cast of anthropomorphic steam locomotives and other vehicles, who all work on the Island of Sodor.

In 1984, The Railway Series books were adapted into a television series initially titled Thomas the Tank Engine & Friends. This ran for 24 series and had several feature-length specials produced during its run. A film adaptation, Thomas and the Magic Railroad, was released theatrically in 2000. After the television series ended in 2021, a reboot titled Thomas & Friends: All Engines Go began in the same year and concluded in 2025. Another reboot premiered on Netflix and YouTube in September 2026, titled Thomas & Friends: Railway Stories, and a second theatrical film is also in development at Mattel Films.

== History ==
=== Background ===
In 1942, two-year-old Christopher Awdry caught measles and was confined to a darkened room. His father told him rhymes to cheer him up, which soon expanded into stories. These formed the basis for The Railway Series books. The first book, The Three Railway Engines, was published in 1945, with Awdry's 26th and final book, Tramway Engines, following suit in 1972. Christopher continued the series, writing 16 more books from 1983 to 2011. These books inspired Britt Allcroft to create the Thomas the Tank Engine & Friends television show.

=== Early attempts at adaptation ===
Multiple attempts to create a show based on The Railway Series happened since 1953, when Eric Marriott was approached by the BBC to adapt two stories based on the Railway Series stories. During the broadcast of The Sad Story of Henry, the engine used in the broadcast fell and was picked up by a hand seconds later. Models moved jerkily, and all effects, music and sound had to be superimposed.

Later, in 1973, Andrew Lloyd Webber, who had read The Railway Series as a child, approached publisher Kaye & Ward with a proposal for his own musical television series, with songs from himself and lyricist Peter Reeves. However, the publishers and the author refused to give Lloyd Webber's company "control of almost everything", which Lloyd Webber's lawyers argued was necessary in order to "secure the investment money from America which would be needed to pay for the animation and the film-making."

The status of the project seemed uncertain, and while Stanley Pickard, Kaye & Ward's managing director at the time, told Awdry that he was "maintaining personal contact with Andrew and still had a slight hope that there might be a way out", Wilbert remained apprehensive, saying that "Once the Americans get hold of it the whole series would be vulgarised and ruined."

Eventually, an agreement was reached and Awdry received an advanced payment of £500. A pilot episode was commissioned from Granada, which would feature 2D cutouts of the engines moving along a background in a style reminiscent of Ivor the Engine, with involvement from animator Brian Cosgrove. The cutouts and backgrounds would be based upon illustrations from The Railway Series. The pilot episode was completed by early 1976, but Granada ultimately decided not to produce a full series, as they feared that at the time Awdry's stories were not popular enough outside the UK to justify investing the time and money needed to make the series. Andrew Lloyd Webber later established the Really Useful Group in 1977, a name derived from the phrase "Really Useful Engine".

=== Early years and the series' success ===
In 1979, British television producer Britt Allcroft was producing a documentary on the Bluebell Railway, a heritage railway in Sussex which featured in the Railway Series book Stepney the Bluebell Engine. As part of her research before filming, Allcroft read some books in The Railway Series and was highly entertained and impressed with the stories which Awdry had written, later remarking that "there was something in the stories that I felt I could develop that would connect with children. I saw a strong emotional content that would carry with little children's experiences with life."

Allcroft worked to convince Awdry that she could, with funding, convert the stories into a successful television show. Her efforts were successful, and she purchased the television rights from the publishers of The Railway Series at a cost of what was then £50,000 ($74,000 in U.S. dollars at the time). Allcroft still had to work to raise the money to finance production and, despite showing a keen interest, wanted a level of creative control which she did not want to forego. In the end, after several years of searching and having to place a second mortgage on her home, Allcroft raised sufficient funding from her local bank manager.

In 1982, Allcroft had secured the world-wide licensing rights to the books for a limited period, and the following year work began on the show.

The series ran starting with the first series in 1984. Series 12 would be the final series to use be filmed in live action (although some computer-generated imagery (CGI) was incorporated), as production transitioned to full CGI in the late 2000s.

=== Reboot ===
In October 2020, Mattel Television formed a new co-production partnership with Corus Entertainment's Nelvana and greenlit two new seasons for the Thomas & Friends series, consisting of 104 11-minute episodes and two hour-long specials.

In January 2021, it was announced that the new episodes were set to be released as an entirely new television series known as Thomas & Friends: All Engines Go. Executive producer Christopher Keenan stated that it was, "crafted to appeal to contemporary audiences' sensibilities while maintaining Thomas' core brand ethos".

The series serves as a reboot of the original Thomas & Friends series that ran from 1984 to 2021. It was originally set to be a continuation of the original series (with the two seasons labeled as series 25 and 26), but Mattel Television later confirmed it to be a separate series. It received immense criticism from fans regarding the new character redesigns and art style, as well as its faithfulness to the source material.

Unlike the original series, Thomas & Friends: All Engines Go was developed in North America rather than Europe.

In celebration of the reboot, the official Japanese YouTube channel created a three-episode miniseries titled Salaryman Thomas (Japanese: サラリーマントーマス). It reimagines the engines as live-action adult office workers.

=== Second reboot ===
In May 2025, a new Thomas & Friends project was announced to be releasing in 2026, said to be a "thrilling new journey that is set to delight fans old and new." This was later revealed to be a new television series. The new series was fully unveiled in January 2026, with several pieces of promotional material and a short clip. The series utilizes the new franchise logo and design. Later a trailer was released on 20 August revealing the new show, titled "Thomas & Friends: Railway Stories", along with a new special, "Really Helpful Engines". It premiered on 17 September, and premiered on Netflix on 30 September, kicking off the franchise's reboot on television.

== Productions ==
Television
Title	Seasons	Episodes	Premiere date	End date	Production companies	Original network	Ref.
Thomas & Friends	24	584	9 October 1984	20 January 2021	Clearwater Features; Gullane Entertainment; HIT Entertainment; Nitrogen Studios; Mattel Television	ITV	
Shining Time Station	5	75	29 January 1989	20 November 1995	The Britt Allcroft Company; Catalyst Entertainment	PBS	
Thomas & Friends: All Engines Go	4	156	13 September 2021	11 September 2025	Mattel Television; Nelvana	Cartoonito	
Thomas & Friends: Railway Stories	1	18	17 September 2026	—N/a	Mattel Studios; Brown Bag Films	Netflix; YouTube	

Thomas & Friends films and specials
Year	Title	Ref.
2000	Thomas and the Magic Railroad	
2005	Thomas & Friends: Calling All Engines!	
2008	Thomas & Friends: The Great Discovery	
2009	Thomas & Friends: Hero of the Rails	
2010	Thomas & Friends: Misty Island Rescue	
2011	Thomas & Friends: Day of the Diesels	
2012	Thomas & Friends: Blue Mountain Mystery	
2013	Thomas & Friends: King of the Railway	
2014	Thomas & Friends: Tale of the Brave	
2015	Thomas & Friends: The Adventure Begins	
2015	Thomas & Friends: Sodor's Legend of the Lost Treasure	
2016	Thomas & Friends: The Great Race	
2017	Thomas & Friends: Journey Beyond Sodor	
2018	Thomas & Friends: Big World! Big Adventures!	
2019	Thomas & Friends: Digs & Discoveries	
2020	Thomas & Friends: The Royal Engine	
2021	Thomas & Friends: Marvelous Machinery	
TBA	Thomas & Friends	

Thomas & Friends: All Engines Go television specials
Year	Title	Ref.
2021	Thomas & Friends: Race for the Sodor Cup	
2022	Thomas & Friends: The Mystery of Lookout Mountain	
2023	Thomas & Friends: The Great Bubbly Build	
2024	Thomas & Friends: The Christmas Letter Express	
2025	Thomas & Friends: Sodor Sings Together	

Thomas & Friends: Railway Stories specials
Year	Title	Ref.
2026	Thomas & Friends: Railway Stories: Really Helpful Engines	

== Commercialisation ==
=== Amusement parks ===
In 1998, Thomas Land opened as a themed area in Fuji-Q Highland in Fujiyoshida, Japan. The land features several themed attractions, including an interactive dark ride and a roller coaster built by Sansei Technologies.

From 2007 until 2017, Drusilla's Park in Sussex, England operated a railway ride featuring Thomas, Annie and Clarabel. The track ran through the Zoo Park.

Since 2007, several Six Flags amusement parks in the US have included Thomas & Friends-themed attractions: Six Flags Discovery Kingdom, Six Flags New England, Six Flags Magic Mountain, Six Flags Over Georgia and Six Flags America. However, in late 2010, Six Flags began the process of renaming and re-theming non-Warner Bros. licensed attractions, including Thomas & Friends.

In 2008, Drayton Manor in Staffordshire, England opened Thomas Land.

In 2018, Kennywood in West Mifflin, Pennsylvania opened Thomas Town, which features four rides featuring Thomas, Cranky, Flynn, and Harold, and a live entertainment show hosted by Sir Topham Hatt.

=== Merchandise ===
Thomas & Friends merchandise has been produced to capitalise on the success of the television series. In the United Kingdom, merchandise was produced starting with the original broadcast of the television series in 1984. Manufacturers produced Thomas-branded items after the television series was broadcast in the United States and Japan. By 1997, the franchise generated over $1 billion in retail sales.

Thomas & Friends ranked number one in the preschool toys category in the U.S. and made the top 10 for the U.S. toy industry in 2010. In January 2011, Thomas & Friends ranked as the number-one preschool toy property in the U.K. for the 11th year in a row. Thomas is also a top-selling toy in Australia, Germany, Japan, and Korea. While the total traditional toy industry in the United States increased 1.9 per cent in 2010, overall Thomas & Friends toy sales increased over 47.1 per cent. Over 200 million books have been sold worldwide.

== Heritage railways ==
HIT Entertainment and later Mattel licenses Day out with Thomas events all over the world, where visitors can ride on a train hauled by replicas of the series' characters.

As none of the E2 Class survived into preservation, locomotives from other classes have been adapted to resemble Thomas. Most replicas are based on 0-6-0 locomotives such as the Austerity 0-6-0ST number 3781, which was converted from a saddle-tank to a side-tank in 1994. at the Mid-Hants Railway. The Strasburg Rail Road in Lancaster, PA (USA) adapted Brooklyn Eastern District Terminal 15 in 1999 and introduced a replica of the character Percy at the Day Out With Thomas event on 13 September 2014. The Talyllyn Railway, in Tywyn in North Wales, upon which the Skarloey Railway in the Railway Series and the television series was based, has held events in the summer in which one or more Skarloey Railway engines "visit" their railway since as early as 1983; the most recent incarnation of these is the Rev. W. Awdry's Little Engines Weekend, which took place in July 2026.

Due to the increasing licensing fees and restrictions imposed by HiT including the need for "Sir Topham Hatt" to undergo a Criminal Records Bureau check, some heritage railways in the UK and overseas no longer run "Thomas" days.

The play The Queen's Handbag, staged to celebrate the 80th birthday of Queen Elizabeth II, featured well-loved characters from children's literature. A near life-sized Thomas carried Sophie Dahl to the stage to meet Sir Topham Hatt (Jonathan Ross) at the beginning of the show. The same Thomas had previously been used in the All Aboard Live Tour.

The Japanese Ōigawa Railway has five locomotives that appear Thomas, Hiro, Percy, James, and Rusty, based at Shin-Kanaya Station. Thomas runs between Shin-Kanaya and Kawaneonsen-Sasamado Station.

== Popularity with autistic audience ==
In 2001, the British National Autistic Society conducted a survey of 81 parents of children with autism and Asperger syndrome to investigate their relationship with Thomas. The survey confirmed the organisation's anecdotal evidence that children with autism spectrum disorders associate more strongly with Thomas than with other children's characters.

In the National Autistic Society's 2007 survey, conducted with 748 UK parents of children under 10 with autism, 58% of parents reported Thomas was the first children's character their children enjoyed, with about one-third of parents reporting their children were able to learn basic facial expressions from the characters. 54% of parents reported that the stories contributed to their child's sense of security.

Mattel developed the autistic character Bruno the Brake Car for Thomas & Friends: All Engines Go. They worked with organisations including the Autistic Self Advocacy Network and the National Autistic Society, and cast Elliott Garcia and Chuck Smith in the UK and US versions respectively to voice the character.
