= T&F =

T&F may refer to:

- Track and field, a collection of sporting events which include running, throwing and jumping.
- Track & Field (video game), a 1980s video game by Konami based on the above sport
- Taylor and Francis, an international company which publishes books and academic journals
- Thomas & Friends (titled Thomas the Tank Engine & Friends prior to 2003), a British television series based on The Railway Series of books by the Reverend Wilbert Awdry and his son, Christopher Awdry.
