= Thomas Land (Drayton Manor) =

Themed area of Drayton Manor Theme Park in Staffordshire

Drayton Manor Resort
- Coordinates: 52.6128°N 1.7133°W
- Opening date: 15 March 2008; 18 years ago Staffordshire, England, U.K.
- Replaced: Robinsons Land

Ride statistics
- Attraction type: Themed area
- Theme: Thomas & Friends
- Rides: 18
- Website: Official website

Thomas Land is a themed area at Drayton Manor Resort in Staffordshire, England, based on the popular long-running children's television series, Thomas & Friends. It stands on the former site of Robinsons Land, a themed area sponsored by the soft drinks brand of the same name. The construction began while the park was still open in September 2007, and many of the Robinsons Land rides were moved to other areas of the park for the remainder of the season. Many of the rides housed in Robinsons Land except the Veteran Cars (now Sodor's Classic Cars) were sold to Funland in Hayling Island. Thomas Land officially opened to the public on 15 March 2008. An expansion of Thomas Land with additional attractions and private party rooms opened on 8 April 2015.

== Rides ==
Thomas Land is set in 3 acres (12,000 m^{2}) of parkland and features many themed rides, alongside outdoor and indoor play areas and the "Discover Thomas & Friends Exhibition".

| # | Name | Opened | Manufacturer | Description |
|---|---|---|---|---|
| 1 | Bertie Bus | 15th March 2008 | Zamperla | A Bertie the Bus-themed crazy bus ride. In partnership with Arriva. Formerly known as ‘Crazy Bertie Bus.’ |
| 2 | Blue Mountain Engines | May 2011 | Zamperla | A junior regetta ride with cars resembling Skarloey, Rheneas, Sir Handel and Peter Sam. The ride was originally located in space where Terence's Driving School originally stood, but was moved to the Thomas Land Expansion in 2015, where Merrick was added to the middle of the ride until sometime in 2018, when he was moved next to it. |
| 3 | Captain's Sea Adventure | 8th April 2015 | Zamperla | A watermania ride with Captain-themed vehicles. |
| 4 | Cranky’s Drop Tower | 15th March 2008 | Zamperla | A Cranky the Crane themed 8m high sky drop ride. |
| 5 | Diesel's Locomotive Mayhem | 15th March 2008 | Zamperla | A demolition derby ride featuring 6 themed cars based on Diesel, Mavis, Iron Bert, Salty, Dennis and Rusty. Originally known as Diesel's Locomotion Mayhem. |
| 6 | Flynn's Fire Rescue | 8th April 2015 | Zamperla | A fire brigade ride with Flynn-themed cars. In partnership with West Midlands Fire Service. |
| 7 | Harold’s Helicopter Tours | 15th March 2008 | Zamperla | A Harold the Helicopter-themed samba tower ride. It's located within Tidmouth Sheds, where guests can gain photo opportunities with Edward, Henry, Gordon, Toby, and Rosie. (repainted red in 2019) Formerly known as ‘Harold’s Heli Tours.’ |
| 8 | James and the Red Balloon | 1st April 2017 | Zamperla | A samba balloon ride based on the Thomas & Friends episode of the same name from the sixth season. |
| 9 | Jeremy Jet's Flying Academy | 15th March 2008 | Zamperla | An aero top jet ride with Jeremy the Jet-themed jets. Relocated to the Thomas Land Expansion in 2015. Formerly known as ‘Jeremy’s Flying Academy.’ |
| 10 | Lady's Carousel | 15th March 2008 | Zamperla | A junior carousel ride with Lady and a train of carriages instead of horses. |
| 11 | Rocking Bulstrode | 15th March 2008 | Zamperla | Bulstrode-themed rockin' tug ride. |
| 12 | Sodor Classic Cars | 1972 | Supercar | A car ride. This is the only ride in the area not themed to Thomas & Friends, and was left over from the Robinsons Land area. Formerly known as ‘Sodor’s Classic Cars.’ |
| 13 | Toby's Tram Express | 8th April 2015 | Zamperla | A Toby-themed barnyard ride. |
| 14 | Troublesome Trucks Runaway Rollercoaster | 15th March 2008 | Gerstlauer | A junior roller coaster located in Thomas Land with Troublesome Truck-themed cars. The height limit is 1m with an adult and 1.2m alone. Formerly known as ‘Troublesome Trucks Runaway Coaster.’ |
| 15 | Winston's Whistle-Stop Tour | 19th July 2013 | Zamperla | An aerial ride with Winston-themed cars. |
| 16 | Thomas and Percy's Submarine Splash | 29th April 2023 | Intamin | A 455m long water ride based on the All Engines Go episode of the same name. |
| 17 | Thomas, Rosie and Percy Engine Tours | 15th March 2008 | Metallbau Emmeln | A themed train ride. The ride first included Thomas and Percy engines. Rosie was added in 2009. A CGI face was added to Thomas in 2014, while CGI faces were added to Percy and Rosie in 2015. Rosie was later repainted red in 2019. |
| 18 | Terence’s Driving School | 15th March 2008 | SB International | A driving school ride with Terence-themed cars. Relocated in May 2011 to the Farmer McColl's Farm area. Relocated in February 2024 to the Main Thomas Land Area. |
| 19 | Spencer's Outdoor Adventure Play | 15th March 2008 | Unknown | An outdoor adventure play area. Formerly known as ‘Spencer’s Activity Park.’ Closed in 2024, until reopening in 2026 and permanently closed later in the year. |
| 20 | Emily's Adventure Play | 15th March 2008 | Unknown | An indoor soft play area. |
| 21 | Discover Thomas & Friends Exhibition | July 2009 | HIT Entertainment | An indoor miniature model railway exhibition with the original models from the first to twelfth series of the television series. Relocated in 2023 in the Thomas Land Shop near Winston's Whistle-Stop Tour. |

== Train rides ==
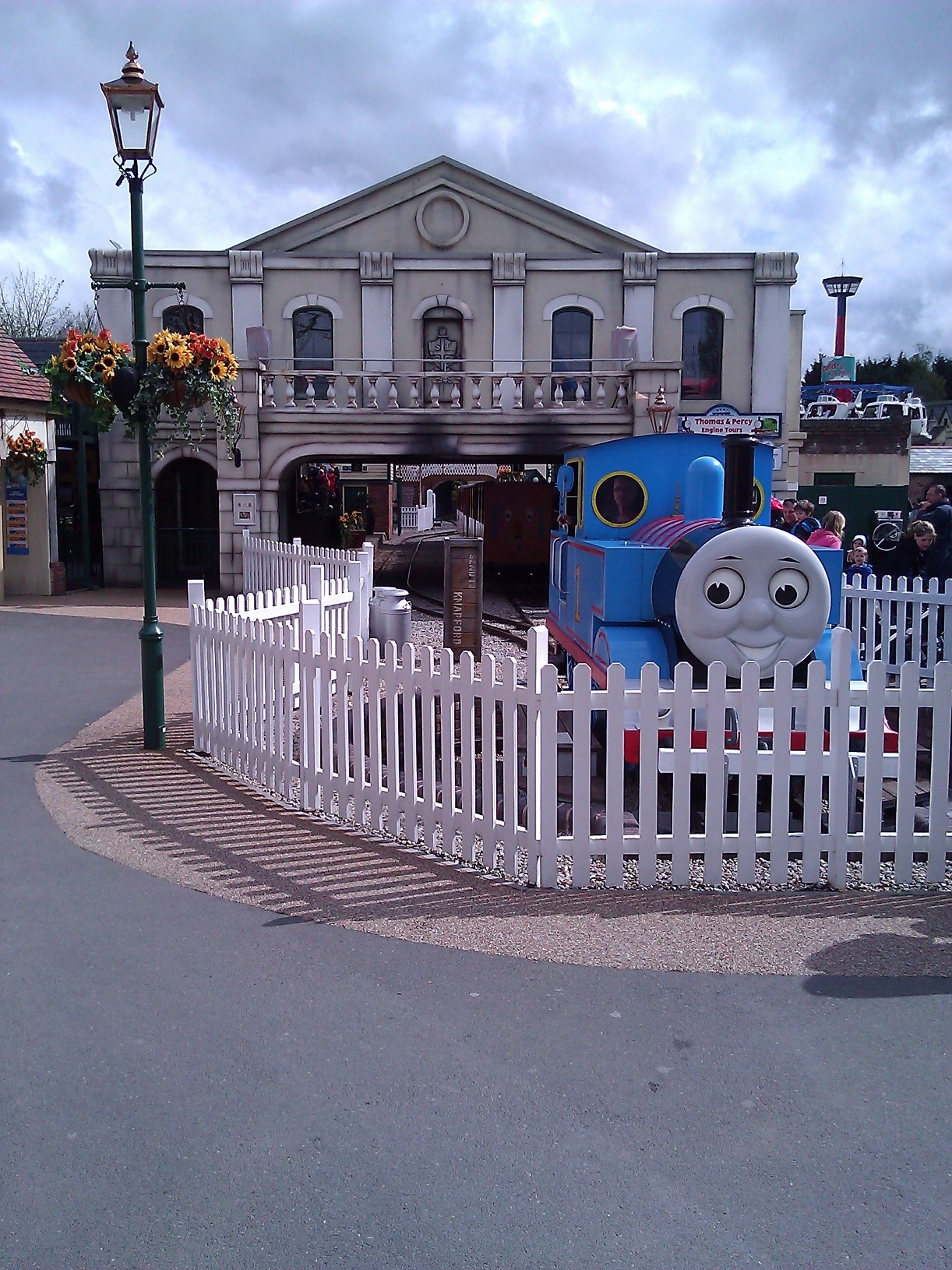
Thomas at Knapford Station

Models of Thomas, Percy and Rosie are used on a 2 ft (610 mm) narrow gauge railway that takes visitors through the park. The line features Tidmouth Sheds with stationary facades of other engines, Knapford Station, which serves as the main station and a refreshment stand, Dryaw and Tidmouth Hault. It also has many sidings and sheds along the way, one of which used to feature a "sleeping" model of James, which was moved near to the James and the Red Balloon ride in 2017.

== See also ==
- List of amusement parks in the United Kingdom
- Thomas Land (Fuji-Q Highland), a Thomas & Friends theme park in Japan
