= L&YR Class 28 =

British steam locomotive class (1909–1957)

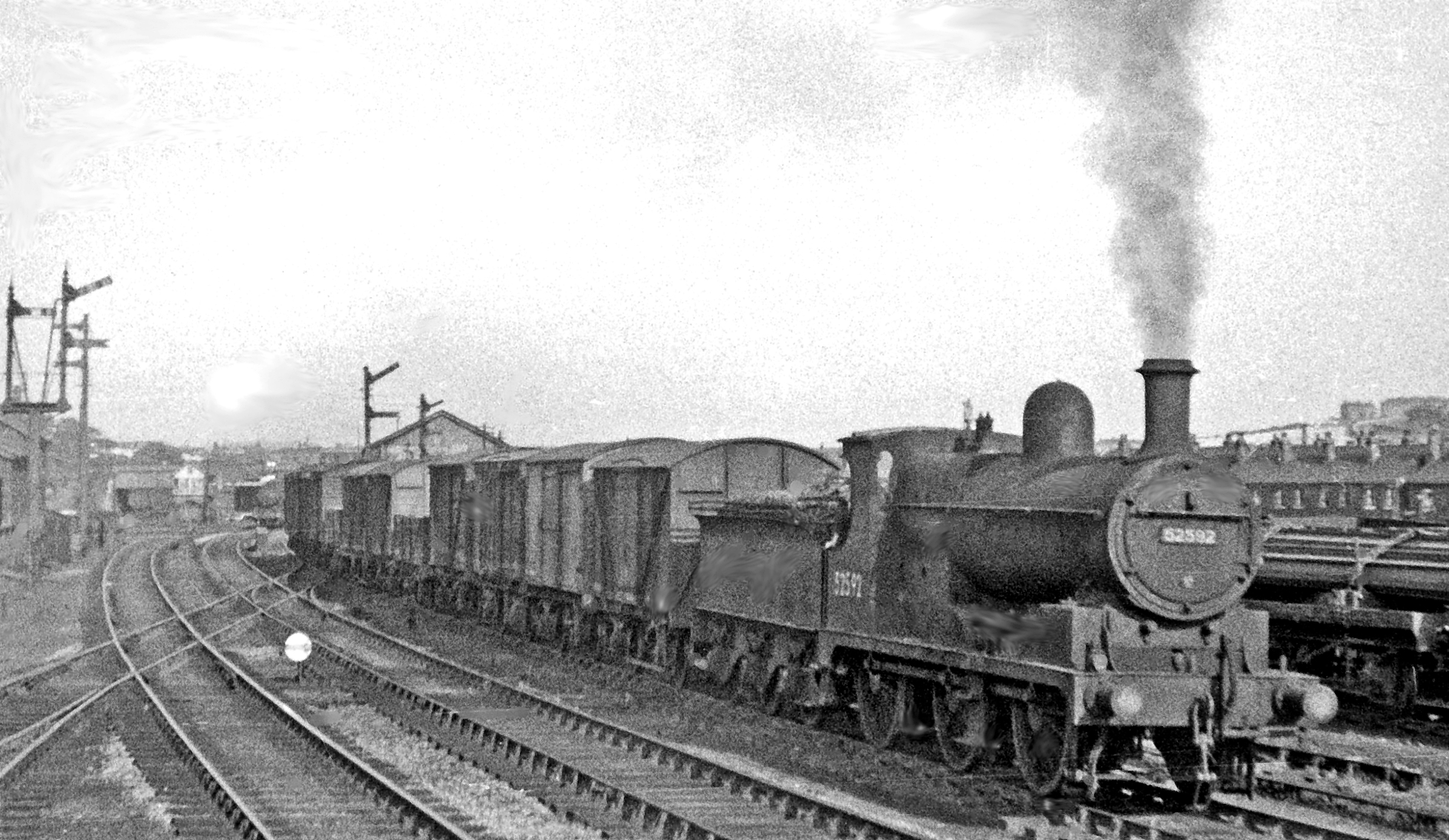
- Rebuilt 27 Class locomotive with BR No. 52592 shunting at Thornhill
Type and origin
- Specification given for L&YR 898 Class at delivery
- Power type: Steam
- Designer: George Hughes
- Builder: L&YR, Horwich Works
- Build date: 1909–1912
- Total produced: 42 (new-builds); 63 (rebuilt from class 27); Total: 105
- Rebuild date: 1911–1922
- Number rebuilt: 63
Specifications
- Configuration
  - Whyte: 0-6-0
- Gauge: 4 ft 8 1/2 in (1,435 mm) standard gauge
- Wheel diameter: 5 ft 1 in (1.549 m)
- Length: 49 ft 10 1/2 in (15.202 m)
- Height: 13 ft 4 3/4 in (4.083 m)
- Loco weight: 44 long tons 5 cwt (99,100 lb or 45 t)
- Total weight: 70 long tons 7.5 cwt (157,600 lb or 71.5 t)
- Fuel type: Coal
- Fuel capacity: 5 long tons 0 cwt (11,200 lb or 5.1 t)
- Water cap.: 1,800 imp gal (8,200 L; 2,200 US gal)
- Boiler pressure: 180 psi (1.24 MPa)
- Cylinders: Two, inside
- Cylinder size: 20 1/2 in × 26 in (521 mm × 660 mm)
- Valve gear: Joy
- Valve type: Piston
Performance figures
- Tractive effort: 27,406 lbf (121.9 kN)
- Factor of adh.: 3.8
Career
- Operators: Lancashire and Yorkshire Railway; London, Midland and Scottish Railway; British Railways
- Class: Class 28
- Power class: LMS & BR: 3F
- Numbers: LMS: 12515…12619 (with gaps); BR: 52515…52619 (with gaps)
- Withdrawn: 1936–1957
- Disposition: All scrapped

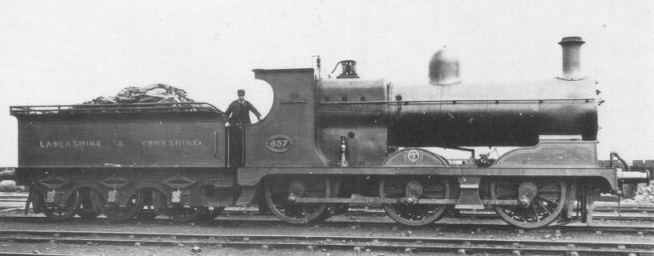
First in class locomotive of 657 Class fitted with Belpaire firebox and superheater, built 1912, Horwich works serial No. 1152.

The Lancashire and Yorkshire Railway Class 28 was a class of 0-6-0 steam locomotive, designed by George Hughes for the Lancashire and Yorkshire Railway (L&YR). It was a redesign of Aspinall's Class 27, with the addition of a superheater. The class consisted of both newly built locomotives as well as rebuilt Class 27 locomotives.

== Technical specifications ==
The locomotives of the Class 28 had two inside cylinders and an inside Joy valve gear, similar to the Class 27. However, instead of the slide valves used in the Class 27, the Class 28 had piston valves due to the addition of a superheater. All newly built locomotives of the Class 28 and some of the converted locomotives received Belpaire fireboxes and had larger 20 1/2 inches (520 mm) cylinders compared to the Class 27 locomotive, which 18 inches (460 mm) cylinders. Furthermore, the smokebox was extended to accommodate the superheater header, the footplate and the front sandboxes were extended, too. The drivers had the same diameter of 5 ft 1 in (1.549 m) as the Class 27.

== History ==
The Class 28 only came into existence with the introduction of the Hughes Classification scheme in 1919. Prior to this, locomotive classes were identified by the running number of the first delivered unit. This method of designation was often confusing, particularly because the Lancashire and Yorkshire Railway (L&YR) frequently reused numbers from scrapped locomotives for new ones. In some cases, the same numbers were assigned up to four times. New number blocks were only created when the locomotive fleet needed to be expanded.

The 898 Class of the Lancashire and Yorkshire Railway (L&YR) was the first British locomotive class to be equipped with a Schmidt superheater. The two prototype locomotives, numbered 898 and 899, were delivered in November 1906. These locomotives retained their round-top boilers but featured extended smokeboxes. Following successful trial operations that demonstrated coal savings up to 12 %, an additional 20 locomotives of the same type were ordered and delivered in 1909.

Another batch of 20 locomotives followed in 1912. These later locomotives not only had superheaters but also incorporated Belpaire fireboxes, and were designated as 657 Class. The boiler was similar to the 816 Class tank locomotive, later designated as L&YR Class 5.

The success of the superheated classes and the enhanced evaporation performance of the Belpaire fireboxes led to the conversion of 63 locomotives from 11 Class and 41 Class starting in 1911. The non-converted saturated steam locomotives of these classes were reclassified as Class 27 after 1919.

The locomotives briefly passed to the London and North Western Railway (LNWR) in 1922 and then to the London, Midland and Scottish Railway (LMS) in 1923. The LMS assigned them the power classification 3F. Their LMS numbers ranged from 12515 to 12619, with gaps. In 1948, the surviving 35 locomotives were transferred to British Railways (BR), which renumbered them from 52515 to 52619, also with gaps.

== Diagram ==
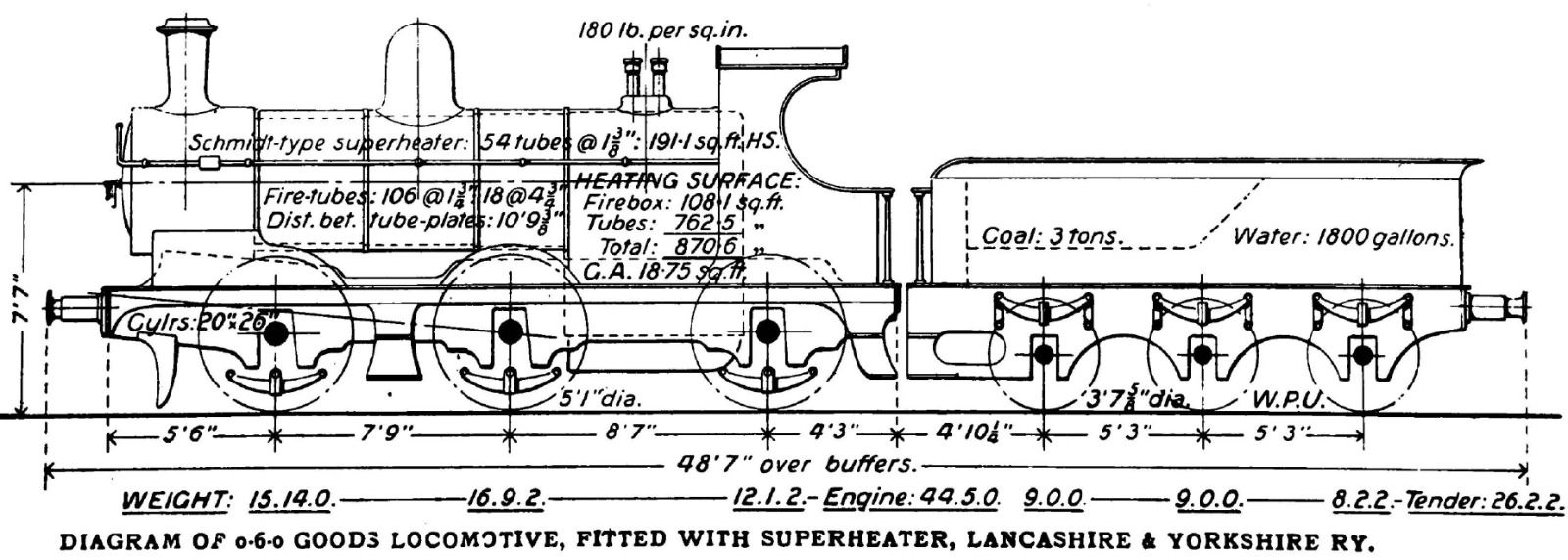
Diagram of Class 898 locomotive with round top firebox.

== In fiction ==
The Class 28 was the inspiration for the character James the Red Engine from The Railway Series books by the Rev W Awdry, and the spin-off TV series Thomas and Friends. Awdry describes James as an experimental rebuild as a 2-6-0 with 5 ft 6 in driving wheels. The other obvious visual difference from the Class 28 is the lack of a leading truck, and extended running board. James also has a Fowler tender.

== Literature ==
- Bertram Baxter (1982). British Locomotive Catalogue 1825-1923. Vol. 3B Lancashire & Yorkshire Railway and its constituent companies. Ashbourne: Moorland Publishing.
