= Thomas & Friends: Railway Stories =

American children's television series

- Genre: Children's
- Created by: Britt Allcroft (Note: Allcroft created the original Thomas & Friends series and the franchise.)
- Based on: The Railway Series by Wilbert Awdry
- Narrated by: Henry Golding
- Music by: Darren Hendley (Note: Original theme music by Mike O'Donnell and Junior Campbell)
- Country of origin: United States
- Original language: English

Production
- Production companies: Mattel Studios; HIT Entertainment

Original release
- Network: YouTube
- Release: 17 September 2026 – present
- Network: Netflix
- Release: 30 September 2026 – present
- Network: Milkshake!
- Release: February 2027

Thomas & Friends: Railway Stories is an American animated children's television series based on The Railway Series books by Wilbert Awdry. It is the second reboot of the British children's series Thomas & Friends created by Britt Allcroft. It follows Thomas the Tank Engine as he and his friends learn about reliability and helpfulness.

Produced by Mattel Studios and animated by Brown Bag Films, Thomas & Friends: Railway Stories was designed to appeal to appeal to both old and new fans of the Thomas franchise. It began with the half-hour television special "Really Helpful Engines", which was released throughout September 2026 alongside a relaunch of the franchise. The series will premiere on Milkshake! in February 2027.

== Premise ==
Thomas the Tank Engine and his friends perform railway jobs across the Island of Sodor, helping others in need and learning about being reliable and helpful.

== Episodes ==
Season	Episodes	Originally released		
Season	Episodes	First released	Last released	Network
1	TBA	February 2027	TBA	Milkshake!

No. overall	No. in season	Title	Directed by	Written by	Original release date
TBA	TBA	"Really Helpful Engines"	Bronagh O'Hanlon	James Hamilton; Jill Cozza-Turner	17 September 2026 (YouTube)
TBA	TBA	"Really Helpful Engines"	Bronagh O'Hanlon	James Hamilton; Jill Cozza-Turner	30 September 2026 (Netflix)
Thomas the Tank Engine aspires to perform important jobs. When Gordon is sent for repairs, Thomas offers to take his place. Gordon advises Thomas to be reliable, which he claims requires doing tasks alone. In trying to be independent, and due to the heaviness of Gordon's freight, Thomas struggles and accidentally damages Farmer McColl's goods. He encounters Percy at a level crossing and offers to take his empty mail wagon. Thomas is unable to pull it up a steep hill; he and the wagon roll back down and Thomas is unable to stop. Percy and Bruno the Brake Car save Thomas and bring him back to Tidmouth Sheds, where Gordon apologises for his advice. Thomas tries again the next day and succeeds with help from his friends.
TBA	1	TBA	TBD	TBD	February 2027

== Production ==
In 2025, Business Wire reported that the Thomas & Friends franchise, which began with the original Thomas & Friends television series, was "ready for a thrilling new journey that is set to delight fans old and new". In January 2026, Mattel announced a "full brand relaunch" of the franchise beginning with the series' launch in the third quarter of 2026. A new redesign of the title character Thomas was also revealed; the redesign was intended to "stay true to Thomas' core" and tested positively with parents and young children. Animation for the series is provided by Brown Bag Films while Mattel Studios serves as producer. Additional coinciding announcements, content, products, and live experiences were rolled out throughout 2026.

=== Casting ===
Henry Golding is cast as the English narrator. Golding expressed feeling "lucky" to have the role, having identified with the character Henry the Green Engine—whom he shared his forename with—during his childhood, and thought himself to be in the "shadow of giants" in reference to past Thomas & Friends narrators such as Ringo Starr and Pierce Brosnan. Karla Souza narrates in the Spanish dub.

Harry Sparkes, a young boy from Harpenden, makes his voice acting debut as the voice of Thomas; Sparkes grew up watching Thomas & Friends and was excited "to be part of something which kids from the next generation will get to grow up to watch". He began voice recording at the age of 13 and kept his role a secret from his classmates for nine months by claiming to be attending physical therapy related to a foot injury. Ellie-Mae Siame, who was cast as Nia, was initially unaware of Thomas' significance. She auditioned for the role in January 2026 at the age of 14 and, despite not expecting any follow-up, was offered the role of Nia soon after.

== Release ==
Thomas & Friends: Railway Stories debuted with the 30-minute television special "Really Helpful Engines", which was released via YouTube on 17 September 2026 and via Netflix on 30 September. In the United Kingdom, the special aired on 5's Milkshake! in October 2026, and the series will premiere on the same programming block in February 2027. By 23 September 2026, "Really Helpful Engines" had surpassed two million views on YouTube.

== See also ==
- Thomas & Friends: All Engines Go
