= L&YR Class 27 =

British steam locomotive class (1889–1962)

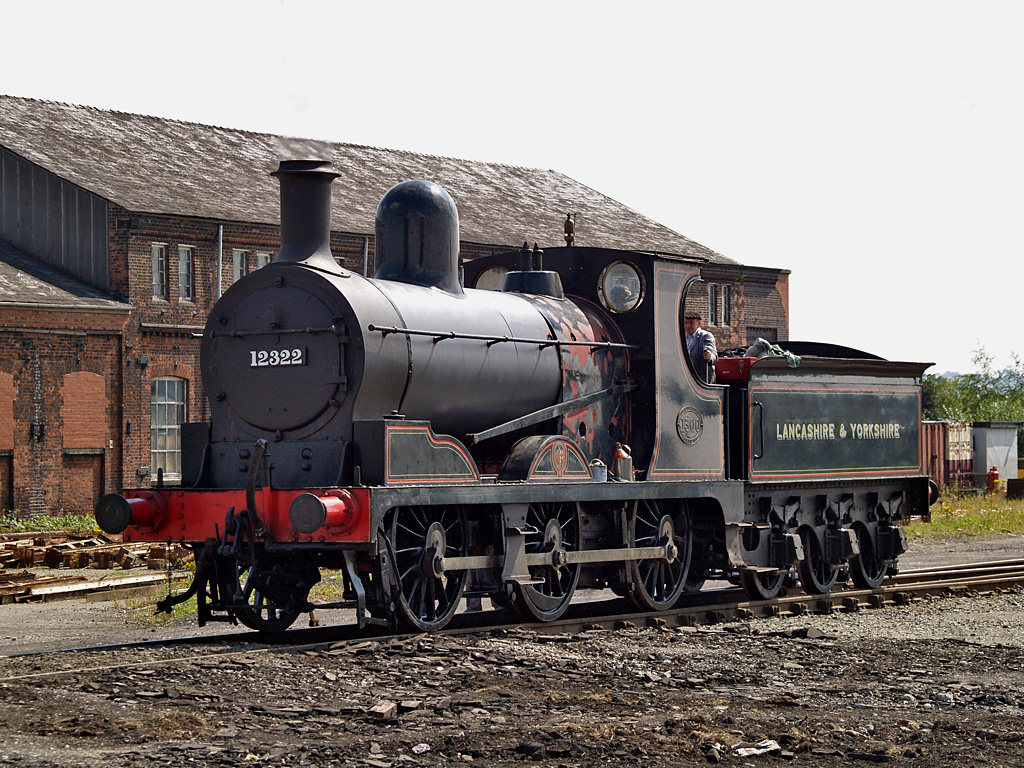
- Preserved 27 class locomotive 1300 on the East Lancashire Railway (built as Class 11 in 1895)
Type and origin
- Power type: Steam
- Designer: John Aspinall
- Builder: L&YR, Horwich Works
- Build date: 1889–1918
- Total produced: 490
Specifications
- Configuration
  - Whyte: 0-6-0
- Gauge: 4 ft 8 1/2 in (1,435 mm) standard gauge
- Wheel diameter: 5 ft 1 in (1.549 m)
- Length: 48 ft 6 in (14.78 m)
- Loco weight: 42 long tons 11 cwt (95,300 lb or 43.2 t)
- Total weight: 69 long tons 3 cwt (154,900 lb or 70.3 t)
- Fuel type: Coal
- Boiler pressure: 180 psi (1.24 MPa)
- Cylinders: Two, inside
- Cylinder size: 18 in × 26 in (457 mm × 660 mm)
- Valve gear: Joy valve gear
- Loco brake: Vacuum
- Train brakes: Vacuum
Performance figures
- Tractive effort: 21,130 lbf (94.0 kN)
Career
- Operators: Lancashire and Yorkshire Railway; London, Midland and Scottish Railway; British Railways
- Class: Class 27
- Power class: LMS & BR: 3F
- Numbers: L&YR: random, LMS: 12083–12467
- Nicknames: "A Class"
- Retired: 1948–1962
- Disposition: One preserved, 63 rebuilt to Class 28, remainder scrapped

The Lancashire and Yorkshire Railway Class 27 is a class of 0-6-0 steam locomotive designed for freight work on the Lancashire and Yorkshire Railway (L&YR).

== Construction and operation ==
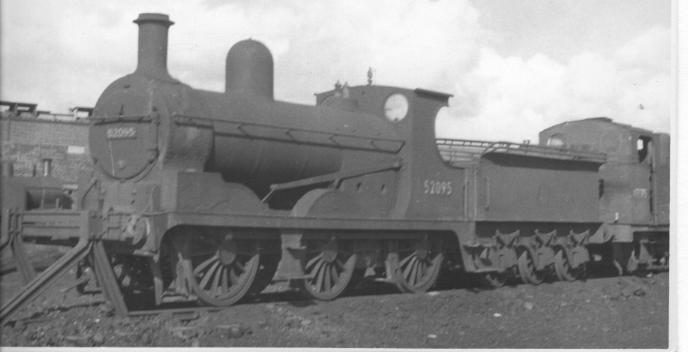
L&YR Class 27 0-6-0 52095 at Rose Grove Motive Power Depot, Burnley, Lancashire, on 28 March 1959, built as 11 Class in 1890

Class 27 locomotives were designed by John Aspinall and 490 were built between 1889 and 1918 at Horwich Works. Before the revision of the class designation by Hughes in 1919, these locomotives belonged to the 11, 41, 898 and 654 classes. It was the standard goods engine used by the Lancashire & Yorkshire Railway. Aspinall opted for a two-cylinder format with a non superheated round-topped boiler. David Joy's configuration of valve gear was employed. By the time Aspinall became general manager of the L&YR on 1 July 1899, 340 of the simple but powerful engines of the 11 class had been built. A further sixty 11 class locomotives were on order, which were built under his successor, Henry Hoy during 1899–1901. A final ninety were built between 1906 and 1918 under Hoy's successor, George Hughes, albeit some with modifications belonging to the 41, 898 and 654 classes.

Like the Barton Wright 0-6-0s of 1876–87, their designed role was for use on goods trains, but with driving wheels 7 inches (180 mm) larger (5 feet 1 inch (1.55 m) instead of 4 feet 6 inches (1.37 m) diameter), they were also suitable for passenger trains when required (on which they could reach 60 miles per hour (97 km/h) or more). On coal trains, they could handle about 27 loaded wagons, so as the demand for coal increased later in the century, the Aspinall 0-8-0s were introduced in 1900 to haul the longer coal trains that the traffic level required.

=== Numbering ===
On the L&YR, new locomotives were only given numbers that had not previously been used if the total locomotive stock was to be increased. Many locomotives were built as nominal replacements for older locomotives that had been withdrawn from service, their numbers being re-used by the new locomotives. For example, the first lot of ten 0-6-0s comprised five built as replacements and five as additions to stock, and so were numbered 11, 130, 252, 367, 484 and 1018–22. Blocks of new numbers given to 185 of the 0-6-0s were: 1018–32, 1053–92, 1113–52, 1180–1209, 1233–57, 1276–85, 1291–1310, and 1599–1603. The 305 re-used numbers were scattered between 1 and 926, also 1363/4/6.

=== Tenders ===
Only 260 of the 490 locomotives were built with new tenders. 230 of those built between 1891 and 1906 were ordered without tenders; for these locomotives, tenders were taken from the pool of spares, primarily those that had been made redundant by the conversion of the Barton Wright 0-6-0s to saddle tanks between 1891 and 1900, but others that had been released by the withdrawal of the Barton Wright 4-4-0s from 1892 onwards. These secondhand tenders had been built between 1876 and 1886; they had a wheelbase of 12 feet 6 inches (3.81 m), equally divided, and carried 1,875 or 2,000 imperial gallons (8,520 or 9,090 L) of water. The new Aspinall tenders were smaller, having a wheelbase of 10 ft 6 in (3.20 m), and carried 1,800 imp gal (8,180 L) of water and 3 long tons (3.05 t) of coal.

== Development and rebuilding ==
As built, there were three primary boiler versions. The majority (418 locomotives) of those built between 1889 and 1906 had round-top fireboxes when new, and operated on saturated steam. Their boilers were similar to those of the 1008 Class 2-4-2T introduced in early 1889, but with slightly shorter barrels (10 ft 4 3/4 in (3.169 m) long as opposed to 10 ft 7 3/8 in (3.235 m) for the 2-4-2T), and they operated at the same pressure: 160 lbf/in^{2} (1,100 kPa), except for twenty built in 1901 (Lot 42), which worked at 180 lbf/in^{2} (1,200 kPa). A further twenty of these were built in 1909 (Lot 62), and ten more in 1917–18 (Lot 75). By this time, several of the earlier locomotives had been rebuilt with Belpaire fireboxes, some also gaining superheaters. With the introduction of Hughes' classification in 1919, the superheated locomotives were placed in Class 28, those retaining saturated steam becoming Class 27.

=== Superheating ===
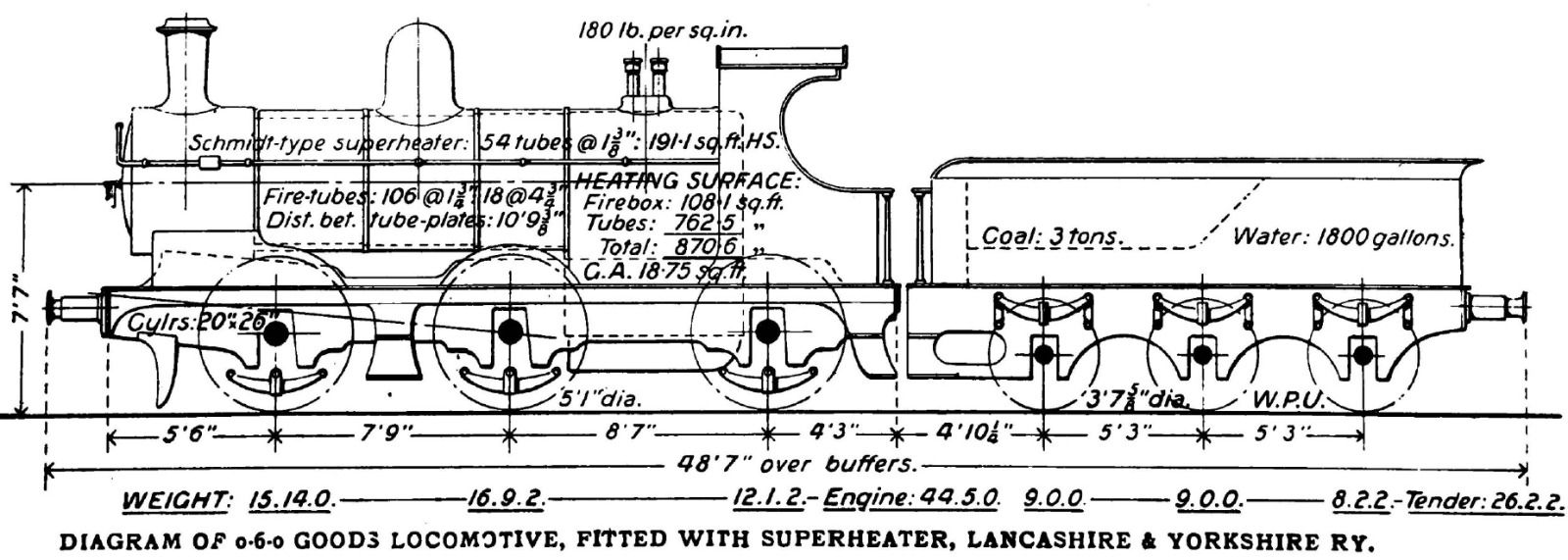
Diagram of superheated 28 Class with round top firebox (Horwich Lot 61, built as 898 class in 1909)

The L&YR was the first British railway to fit a locomotive with a superheater, this being no. 737 of the 1400 Class 4-4-2 in 1899, and experiments had been conducted with various superheater types since then. Two of the 0-6-0 locomotives built in 1906, nos. 898 and 900, were the first British locomotives to be provided with Schmidt superheaters when new, the purpose being to increase the temperature of steam produced in the boiler so the minimum of energy was lost. After months of trials, 20 further locomotives with the Schmidt superheater were authorised to be built and the first of these emerged from Horwich Works in 1909. This batch together with the two prototypes formed the 898 class. These superheated locomotives had the same boiler pressure as the 11 class locomotives, 180 psi. All 898 class locomotives had round topped boilers. In 1914 locomotive no. 625 was rebuilt with a superheated Belpaire boiler, but no others were so treated – between 1926 and 1931, most of the others were rebuilt with saturated round-top boilers, only the last four of the batch, nos. 830, 901/3/4 (by this time renumbered as LMS 12533–6) retaining their superheated round-top boilers until withdrawal in 1934–36.

=== Belpaire fireboxes ===
The L&YR had begun using the Belpaire firebox in 1897, with the 1351 Class 0-6-0T. From 1911 to 1916, 48 of the 0-6-0s were rebuilt with these fireboxes, continuing to use saturated steam. Unlike the 2-4-2T, no 0-6-0s were built new with saturated Belpaire boilers.

=== Belpaire fireboxes with superheaters ===
In 1912 a batch of 20 new 0-6-0s was constructed with both Belpaire fireboxes and superheaters. These locomotives belonged to the 657 class. They used three different types of superheaters: the first fifteen used the Schmidt superheater, the next three used the Horwich "top-and-bottom header" (T&B) type, and the last two (nos. 243 and 920) used the Horwich "twin plug" type. These two were the only 0-6-0s with that type of superheater, which was primarily used in larger engines such as the 1546 Class 0-8-0. All twenty worked at a pressure of 180 lbf/in^{2} (1,200 kPa) and belonged to the 657 class.

Between 1913 and 1916, 23 of the original 0-6-0s plus no. 625 of the 1909 series were rebuilt with Belpaire fireboxes and superheaters; the first nineteen such rebuilds were given the Schmidt type, but from mid-1915 the T&B type was used instead. A further forty were rebuilt with Belpaire fireboxes and T&B superheaters in 1919–22, two of which were among those previously rebuilt with saturated Belpaire boilers.

=== Cylinders and valves ===
The first 160 locomotives, of 1889–93, had cylinders with a bore of 18 inches (460 mm) and a stroke of 26 inches (660 mm), the same as those used on the 2-4-2s. The sixty built in 1894 and early 1895 had 17 1/2 inches (440 mm) bore, like the 2-4-2s of the same period, and the next sixty of mid-1895 to early 1896 returned to the original size. All 280 had unbalanced D slide valves. From September 1896, locomotives built with saturated boilers had 18-inch cylinders and Richardson balanced slide valves. The locomotives built with superheaters had larger cylinders and piston valves, those of the 898 class built in 1906–09 having a cylinder bore of 20 inches (510 mm) whilst those of the 657 class built in 1912 were further enlarged, to 20 1/2 inches (520 mm). Locomotives rebuilt with superheaters were provided with piston valves at the same time.

=== Brakes ===
The L&YR had standardised on the automatic vacuum brake (Note: An automatic brake is one where the brakes are automatically applied if there is a failure anywhere in the brake pipe. By comparison, a failure in the pipe of a simple (or non-automatic) vacuum brake will release the brakes in the train.) in the 1880s, and since 1888 all L&YR passenger carriages had been fitted with this brake. Accordingly, it was necessary for all locomotives used on passenger trains to be equipped for operating this brake, and this included these 0-6-0 locomotives. The 400 locomotives of the 11 class, built down to 1901 under Aspinall and Hoy, created the necessary vacuum by means of vacuum pumps driven from the left-hand crosshead. The twenty 41 class locomotives built in 1906 under Hughes were equipped with combination vacuum ejectors instead of pumps, utilising exhaust steam from the blastpipe. Combination ejectors were already in use on L&YR passenger locomotives; in one unit they combined a large ejector used to release the train brakes when starting, and a small ejector used to maintain the vacuum when running. Successful trials of the ejector-equipped locomotives convinced Hughes not only to fit ejectors to all subsequent locomotives, but also to replace the pumps on all of the previous locomotives with ejectors.

Summary of variants as built
Horwich Lots	Class	Years	Quantity	Cylinders	Brakes	Firebox	Superheated	CME
2, 3, 5, 6, 8, 9, 13–15	11	1889–93	160	18 in, slide valves	Vacuum pump	Round-top	No	Aspinall
18, 19, 21	11	1894–95	60	17 1/2 in, slide valves	Vacuum pump	Round-top	No	Aspinall
23–25, 29, 31, 33, 39, 40, 42	11	1895–1901	180	18 in, slide valves	Vacuum pump	Round-top	No	Aspinall
53 (part)	41	1906	18	18 in, slide valves	Vacuum ejectors	Round-top	No	Hughes
53 (part), 61	898	1906, 1909	22	20 in, piston valves	Vacuum ejectors	Round-top	Yes	Hughes
62	41	1909	20	18 in, slide valves	Vacuum ejectors	Round-top	No	Hughes
68	657	1912	20	20 1/2 in, piston valves	Vacuum ejectors	Belpaire	Yes	Hughes
75	41	1917–18	10	18 in, slide valves	Vacuum ejectors	Round-top	No	Hughes

Horwich Lots 2, 3 and 75 comprised 10 locomotives each; the rest 20 each. Lot 53 was for 18 saturated and two superheated locomotives. Lots 61 and 62 were built together, in alternate batches of five.

== Ownership changes ==
In 1917, 32 locomotives (all with saturated round-top boilers) were loaned to the Railway Operating Division (ROD) during World War I, for which they were given numbers 1700–31: the ROD increased those numbers by 7000 to avoid duplication. 22 of them also exchanged their six-wheel tenders for eight-wheel tenders of Aspinall 0-8-0s All of them were eventually returned during 1919 once the war had ended, their tenders being re-exchanged and original numbers restored.

The whole class passed to the London, Midland and Scottish Railway (LMS) at the beginning of 1923, and they were subsequently numbered in two blocks. Nos. 12083–12467 (385 locomotives) comprised those operating on saturated steam, including those rebuilt with Belpaire boilers as well as those retaining round-top boilers; the two types were numbered in order of age, regardless of the boiler type. Nos. 12515–12619 (105 locomotives) comprised those built with superheaters in 1906–12 (42 locomotives) in order of age, followed by those rebuilt from saturated locomotives in 1913–22 (63 locomotives) in approximate order of rebuilding. These 490 locomotives formed the bulk of the 540 0-6-0 tender locomotives (out of 1,651 L&YR steam locomotives in total) handed over by the L&YR to the LMS.

It is a tribute to the soundness, usefulness and simple practicality of Aspinall's design that 300 of the class passed into the ownership of the London, Midland and Scottish Railway (LMS) and around 50 were operating in British Railways (BR) service in summer 1960. British Railways took ownership of 235 of the class in 1948 and renumbered them 52088-52529 (with gaps) by the addition of 40000 to their LMS numbers.

Withdrawal of the saturated locomotives began in 1931, and of the superheated locomotives in 1934. By the end of 1940, 154 had been withdrawn, but there was a pause during the war with none being withdrawn during the years 1941–44. At the end of 1947, there were 245 saturated and 37 superheated locomotives left. Withdrawals recommenced in 1945 and continued until the last superheated locomotive was withdrawn in 1957 and the last saturated locomotive in 1962.

== Preservation ==
One locomotive, 1895-built L&YR number 1300 (later LMS 12322 and BR 52322) has survived and is preserved at the East Lancashire Railway. It is owned by Andy Booth and its most recent overhaul was completed in 2021.
