= Shin-Kanaya Station =

Railway station in Shimada, Shizuoka Prefecture, Japan

Shin-Kanaya Station 新金谷駅
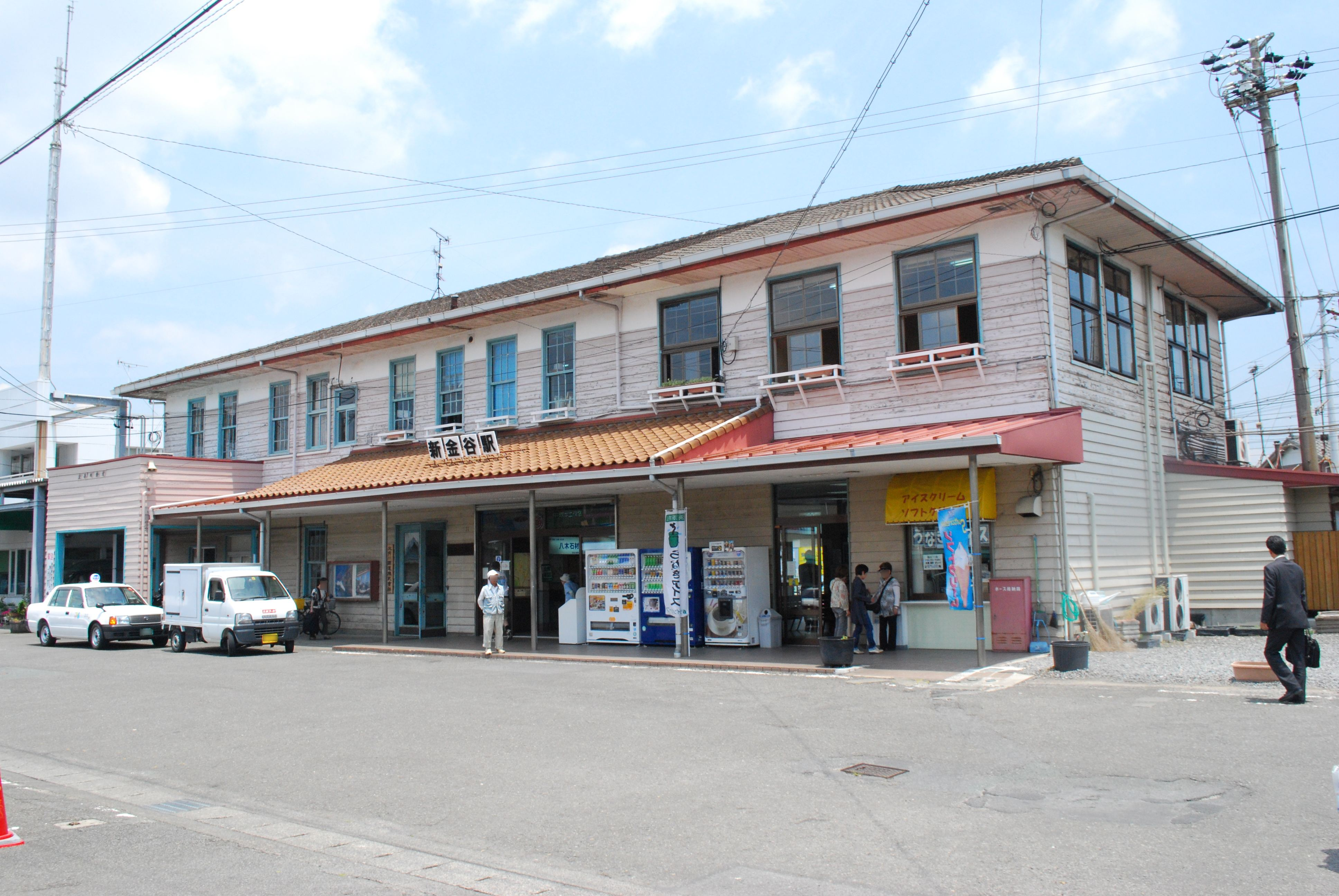
- Shin-Kanaya Station

General information
- Location: Kanaya-Higashi 2-1112-2, Shimada-shi, Shizuoka-ken; Japan
- Coordinates: 34°49′34″N 138°08′14″E
- Operator: Ōigawa Railway
- Line: ■Ōigawa Main Line
- Distance: 1.3 kilometers from Kanaya
- Platforms: 1 island platform

Other information
- Status: Staffed

History
- Opened: June 10, 1927

Passengers
- FY2017: 504 daily
Location
- Location within Shizuoka Prefecture Location within Japan

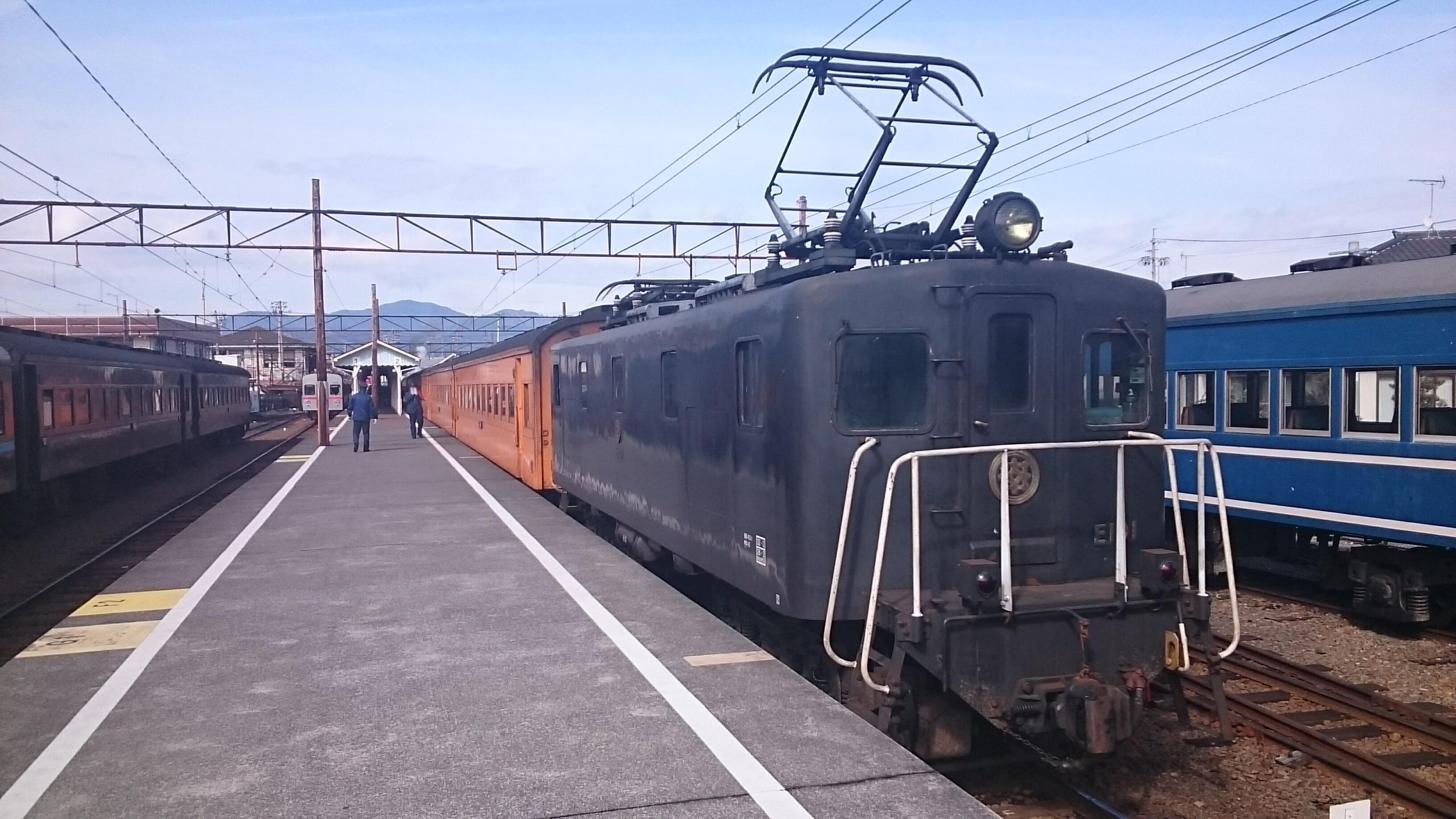
Platform

Shin-Kanaya Station (新金谷駅, Shin-Kanaya-eki) is a railway station in the city of Shimada, Shizuoka Prefecture, Japan, operated by the Ōigawa Railway.

== Lines ==
Shin-Kanaya Station is on the Ōigawa Main Line and is 2.3 from the terminus of the line at Kanaya Station.

== Station layout ==
The station has a single island platform. The station has a turntable and a locomotive maintenance shed, both primarily used for steam locomotives. The station has many shunt tracks, and is a boneyard for obsolete locomotives formerly in use on the Ōigawa Railway or the Japan National Railway. The station building is a two-story clapboard wooden structure connected to the platform by a level crossing. The station is staffed.

== Adjacent stations ==
«	Service	»
Ōigawa Railway
Ōigawa Main Line
Kanaya	SL Express	Ieyama
Kanaya	Local	Daikanchō

== Station history ==
Shin-Kanaya Station was opened on June 10, 1927, the same day that the Ōigawa Railway began service.

== Passenger statistics ==
In fiscal 2017, the station was used by an average of 504 passengers daily (boarding passengers only).

== Surrounding area ==
- Nippon Saemon Kubiki-zuka

== See also ==
- List of railway stations in Japan
