= Thomas Land (Fuji-Q Highland) =

Themed children's section in Fuji-Q Highland

Coordinates: 35.48730°N 138.78050°E

Thomas Land (トーマスランド) is a themed children's amusement section based on Thomas & Friends in Fuji-Q Highland, an amusement park in Fujiyoshida, Yamanashi, Japan. The section opened in 1998.

Attractions include Thomas' Treasure Hunt (a story-driven narrated indoor rail ride), Thomas & Percy's Fun Ride (an outdoor rail ride), Go! Go! Bulstrode! (a water raft rail ride), Mischievous Cranky (a rotating aerial ride), Nia and Animal Coaster (a roller coaster for small children), 3D Maze - Thomas Circus (a Thomas-themed hedge maze), and monuments to Thomas and Percy for photo opportunities.

Thomas Land is different from the smaller Thomas Town attractions in Japan, one in Shinmisato, and the other in Kurashiki.

== Attractions ==
=== Current ===
Name	Opened	Description
Thomas and the Dancing Party	1998	Teacups-style ride where guests can spin on different Thomas characters.
Nia and Animal Coaster	1998	A small junior coaster themed after Nia, as she takes riders around her hometown of Kenya. Originally named "Rock 'n' Roll Duncan" and themed to Duncan with narrow-gauge coaches.
Thomas and Percy's Fun Ride	1998	Narrow-gauge train ride with Thomas, Percy, and James-themed engines that traverse an outdoor panorama that imitates the scenery of Sodor Island. Lady was added to the ride in May 2001, but was removed in May 2010 to make way for James, who replaced her as the third operating engine in October 2010. The panorama has been refurbished twice, most recently in September 2015.
Thomas' Bubbly Splash	1999	Log flume ride based on the episode "Sir Topham Hatt's Holiday". Opened in July 1999.
Mischievous Cranky	1999	Cranky-themed Crazy Bus ride. Opened as part of the park's first major expansion in July 1999.
Thomas' Treasure Hunt	2005	Story-driven indoor rail ride where guests ride in cars styled like Troublesome Trucks and go through areas featuring recreations of moments from various episodes. The ride first opened as "The Great Gatagoto Adventure" in 2005, and was refurbished as "Thomas' Party Parade" in July 2011 with a new storyline. It was refurbished again and reopened under its current name in January 2019.
Go! Go! Bulstrode!	2010	Bulstrode-themed Rockin' Tug ride. It is a clone of the ride "Rockin' Bulstrode" at Thomas Land at Drayton Manor in the UK.
3D Maze - Thomas Circus	2015	3D maze attraction. Opened in July 2015 to coincide with the franchise's 70th anniversary, and replaced the original Thomas Maze.
Thomas' Dokidoki Playground	2018	Indoor play area that replaced the Thomas Land 3D Theater.
Hopping Winston	2018	Flying Elephants-style ride with Winston-themed cars. Replaced Self-Drive Vehicles.
Thomas' Happy Smile	2018	Ferris wheel styled ride that replaced Happy Harold.
Harold's Sky Patrol	2020	Harold-themed Samba Tower ride. It is a clone of the ride "Harold's Heli-Tours" from Thomas Land at Drayton Manor in the UK.

Other additions to the park include:

- Thomas and Percy Monuments
- Gazebo
- Story Creation Station
- Wishing Falls - Based on the episode "Toby and the Flood"

=== Former ===
Name	Opened	Closed	Description
Happy Harold	1998	2018	Harold-themed aerial ride. Replaced with Thomas' Happy Smile.
Self-Drive Vehicles	1998	2018	Kiddie ride-on cars themed to different Thomas characters. Replaced with Hopping Winston.
Play Area	1998	2010	
Thomas Maze	1998	2015	Hedge Maze with different recreations of episode scenes. Replaced with 3D Maze - Thomas Circus.
Thomas Land 3D Theater	2010	2018	3D cinema attraction showcasing episodes from the TV series, including the only time that the twelfth season has been showcased in the country. Replaced with Thomas' Dokidoki Playground.

== See also ==
- Thomas Land (Drayton Manor) - a Thomas & Friends theme park at the Drayton Manor amusement park in the United Kingdom.
