= Thomas & Friends: All Engines Go =

Animated children's television series

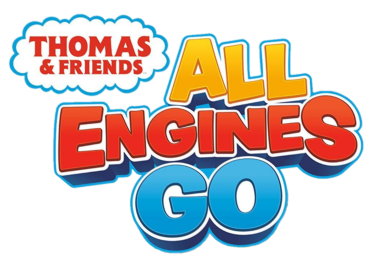
- Genre: Comedy
- Created by: Britt Allcroft (Note: While she had no creative control over it, for episodes 37 and 38 of season two, Allcroft is credited as the original creator for television, while subsequent episodes remove Allcroft's crediting altogether.)
- Based on: The Railway Series by Wilbert Awdry
- Developed by: Rick Suvalle
- Directed by: Campbell Bryer
- Creative director: Monica Dennis
- Voices of: Meesha Contreras; David Kohlsmith; Kai Harris; Neil Crone; Glee Dango; Shomoy James Mitchell; Will Bhaneja; Talia Evans; Ava Ro; Chuck Smith; Jenna Warren; Charlie Zeltzer; Milo Toriel-McGibbon; Kaia Oz; Bruce Dow; Luke Marty; Kayla Lorette; Patrick Kwok-Choon; Cory Doran; Kintaro Akiyama; Catherine Disher; Linda Kash; Jamie Watson; Edward Glen; Joe Pingue; Diya Kittur; Scott McCord; Addison Holley; Evany Rosen; Naomi Snieckus; Matt Baram; Dan Chameroy; Ivan Sherry; Dana Puddicombe
- Theme music composer: Julie Fader
- Opening theme: "All Engines Go"
- Ending theme: "All Engines Go" (instrumental)
- Composer: Erica Procunier
- Countries of origin: United States; Canada
- Original language: English
- No. of seasons: 4
- No. of episodes: 161

Production
- Executive producers: Colin Bohm; Christopher Keenan; Doug Murphy; Frederic Soulie; Pam Westman
- Producers: Rick Suvalle; Suzie Gallo
- Running time: 11 minutes
- Production companies: Mattel Television; Nelvana

Original release
- Network: Cartoon Network
- Release: September 13, 2021 – November 27, 2023
- Network: Netflix
- Release: March 7, 2024 – September 11, 2025

Related
- Thomas & Friends: Railway Stories

Thomas & Friends: All Engines Go is an animated children's television series created by Britt Allcroft and developed by Rick Suvalle that originally aired on Cartoon Network's Cartoonito block in the United States from September 13, 2021, to November 27, 2023, and premiered on Treehouse in Canada on September 18, 2021. The series was later released on Netflix in the United States from March 7, 2024, to September 11, 2025. It was produced by Mattel Television and animated by Corus Entertainment's Nelvana.

The series is a reboot of the original Thomas & Friends series that ran from 1984 until 2021. It was originally believed to be a continuation of the original series (with the four seasons labeled as series 25–28), but Mattel Television later confirmed it to be a separate series. It introduces "an entirely new approach to Thomas & Friends content", with a new animation style and story structure.

In October 2022, the series was renewed for two more seasons of 26 episodes each. The final episodes were released on September 11, 2025. Following the show's conclusion, Mattel later announced a new television series for the franchise in May 2025, with a sneak preview releasing in January 2026. This new series aims to be more faithful to the style and feel of the original series.

== Premise ==
The series focuses on the adventures of a younger version of Thomas the Tank Engine and his friends, including Percy, Nia, Kana, and Diesel. Throughout the episodes, they learn many life lessons and solve problems.

== Episodes ==
=== Series overview ===
Season	Episodes	Originally released		
Season	Episodes	First released	Last released	Network
1	52	September 13, 2021	July 5, 2022	Cartoon Network
2	52	September 12, 2022	November 27, 2023	Cartoon Network
3	26	March 7, 2024	September 19, 2024	Netflix
4	26	April 10, 2025	September 11, 2025	Netflix

=== Season 1 (2021–22) ===
No. overall	No. in season	Title	Directed by	Written by	Original release date	Prod. code	U.S. viewers (millions)
1	1	"A Thomas Promise"	Jason Groh	Rick Suvalle	September 13, 2021	2501	0.09
After an argument during a game results in Gordon breaking his coupler, Thomas and Diesel make it up to him by delivering his train to the Recycling Center. However, Thomas and Diesel are determined to beat each other to the center, causing problems for all involved. Song: "I'm Gonna Chug"
2	2	"Thomas Blasts Off"	Campbell Bryer	Christopher Gentile	September 13, 2021	2502	0.09
Thomas is disappointed to be carrying an insignificant battery when the engines are to help participate in a rocket launch, but as time grows on he learns that even the seemingly insignificant deliveries can be very important, and not every special load has to be large.
3	3	"License to Deliver"	Campbell Bryer	Peter Gaffney	September 13, 2021	2503	0.09
To help Percy conquer his nyctophobia on a nighttime run to the lighthouse, Thomas has the two of them pretend to be secret agents, and Percy learns that nothing is scary in the dark when knowing what is there. Song: "Secret Agents"
4	4	"Rules of the Game"	Jason Groh	Aydrea Walden	September 13, 2021	2504	0.09
Thomas constructs an obstacle course for his friends, but all of them aren't enjoying it as much as he is. After talking with them, he realizes that he built the course specifically based on his preferences, and did not account for those of his friends.
5	5	"A Quiet Delivery"	Jason Groh	David Shayne	September 14, 2021 (Note: These episodes were first released on the Cartoon Network app and video-on-demand services on September 13, 2021.)	2505	0.10
Thomas has to haul Annie and Clarabel to the docks in time for a nighttime passenger run. However, they must be well rested for the trip, but Thomas quickly learns that a noisy day makes it very difficult not to wake sleeping coaches. Song: "Chugga-Chugga Snooze Snooze"
6	6	"Kana Goes Slow"	Campbell Bryer	Craig Carlisle	September 14, 2021	2506	0.10
Kana breaks down while on a run to Vicarstown, and reluctantly allows Thomas to tow her, despite his slower speed. On the way, however, Thomas shows her that there is a lot to take in when taking it slow and easy, and Kana learns that there is good in life outside the fast lane.
7	7	"Dragon Run"	Campbell Bryer	Christopher Gentile	September 15, 2021	2507	N/A
Thomas is given the job of delivering a fake dragon to the castle for a medieval festival. However, he refuses to share the job with his friends, and learns that the best experiences are the ones where everyone participates. Song: "Knights of the Turntable"
8	8	"The Biggest Adventure Club"	Jason Groh	Peter Gaffney	September 15, 2021	2508	N/A
Sandy is furious when Thomas, Percy, and Carly set off exploring the mines for a cavern full of crystals without her, worried about her stature placing her in harm's way. Determined to prove herself, she sets off on her own expedition with Diesel at her side.
9	9	"Percy's Lucky Bell"	Jason Groh	Aydrea Walden	September 16, 2021	2509	N/A
Thomas takes Percy's lucky bell on a run to the mines, but despite promising to be careful with it he ends up dropping it down a mineshaft. As they set off to retrieve it with Carly and Sandy, Thomas learns to be more responsible with his promises, while Percy learns to trust others much more than what he believes. Song: "I Sure Am Feeling Lucky"
10	10	"Sandy's Sandy Shipment"	Campbell Bryer	Karissa Valencia	September 16, 2021	2510	N/A
Sandy is ecstatic to accompany Thomas on a sand delivery, and is determined to be the best helper she can be, despite how easy Thomas thinks the task would turn out.
11	11	"A Wide Delivery"	Campbell Bryer	Niki Lytton	September 17, 2021	2511	N/A
On a job of delivering houses, Thomas is disappointed to be partnered with Diesel instead of his best friend, Percy. Jealous of the fun Percy is having with Nia, Thomas neglects Diesel throughout the journey, and learns that when it comes to having fun with others, best friends are not the only people to hang out with. Song: "A Partner on the Rails"
12	12	"Counting Cows"	Jason Groh	Liz Hara	September 17, 2021	2512	N/A
A routine job of delivering cattle becomes problematic for Thomas and Percy when they consistently lose a number of cows throughout the day. Working out a number of plans to find the cows, the two learn that a task can be made easier if done as a kind of game.
13	13	"Music is Everywhere"	Jason Groh	Adam Beechen	September 20, 2021	2513	N/A
Gordon is late delivering instruments for a concert and the engines quickly get him on his way, but when Nia gets stranded on the other side of a drawbridge stuck open, they cheer her up by performing their own makeshift concert using what they learned: any sound can be music. Song: "Music is Everywhere"
14	14	"Backwards Day"	Campbell Bryer	Craig Carlisle	September 27, 2021	2514	N/A
Thomas teaches Percy the basics of backwards day, a day where the engines do most of their tasks in reverse and use opposite terms. However, after he mixes up a pair of deliveries, Thomas learns that what is heard is not always right, while Gordon learns that fun and work can go hand in hand.
15	15	"Chasing Rainbows"	Campbell Bryer	Brandon Violette	October 4, 2021	2515	N/A
The engines race towards what they perceive as the end of the rainbow to find the supposed treasure, but it always changes location whenever they get close. Once they actually reach it, Thomas and the others realize that sometimes, the real treasure can only be realized when the bigger picture is seen in full. Song: "Chasing Rainbows"
16	16	"Nia's Balloon Blunder"	Jason Groh	Patrick Rieger	October 11, 2021	2516	N/A
Thomas and Kana join Nia in bringing a parade balloon to Vicarstown for current festivities, but despite her preparations, Nia fails to account for several obstacles in her plan to keep the wind away from the balloon. With Thomas's help, she learns that improvisation can place even the most disastrous outcomes back on the right track.
17	17	"Capture the Flag"	Jason Groh	Denise Downer	October 18, 2021	2517	N/A
Not wanting to be late for a parade, Thomas encourages Percy to rush through his checklist, but learns that it is better to take time and go through every step when they lose Nia's flag for the parade. Song: "The Mail Delivery Song"
18	18	"Mystery Boxcars"	Campbell Bryer	Phil Molloy	October 25, 2021	2518	N/A
Kana is frustrated by her tendency to run out of power on her Vicarstown runs, and to cheer her up after a particularly bad drain, Gordon sets up a scavenger hunt for her, and joined by Thomas, Percy, and the Fix-it Crew, Kana finds machinery components that make a device which will solve her problems.
19	19	"Super Screen Cleaners"	Campbell Bryer	Brent Piaskoski	November 1, 2021 (Note: These episodes were first released on Netflix on October 29, 2021.)	2519	N/A
For a movie night at Vicarstown, Nia has to deliver the screen that will show the film. However, it must be clean, and even while pretending to be a superhero, Thomas is dejected that they failed to keep it spotless, but learns that there is more than one way to be a hero. Song: "If I Was a Super Train"
20	20	"Overnight Stop"	Jason Groh	Niki Lytton	November 8, 2021	2520	N/A
An overnight tanker delivery to the mainland means that Thomas, Percy, and Nia have to sleep in the woods for part of the trip. However, Percy is very anxious about sleeping far from home, but with the help of his friends learns that if made a little more familiar, sleeping away from home can be a fun experience.
21	21	"The Joke is On Thomas"	Jason Groh	Brian Swenlin	November 15, 2021	2521	N/A
Thomas starts a joking spree on a day that Diesel is determined not to run late on. However, Diesel accidentally takes a boxcar rigged to explode with confetti, and Thomas and Percy have to switch it with his real car before it is too late. In the end, Thomas learns that someone has to be in the mood to laugh, while Diesel learns that laughter can brighten up a very bad day. Song: "Get on the Laugh Track"
22	22	"Lost and Found"	Campbell Bryer	Sarah Eisenberg & Becky Wangberg	November 22, 2021	2522	N/A
Nia has to take a load of beach balls to Norramby Beach, but things go disastrously wrong when she agrees to deviate from her planned route and follow Thomas on one of his shortcuts. After a wrong turn, the two engines quickly get lost, and upon completing their trip Thomas learns that some shortcuts are better left unused, while both of them learn that there is more than one way to travel somewhere.
23	23	"Thomas' Day Off"	Campbell Bryer	Craig Carlisle	November 29, 2021	2523	N/A
When Thomas learns that he does not have any jobs assigned to him for the day, he finds having a day off when completely alone to be off-putting and depressing. Upon coming across and old boxcar and a battered volleyball, however, he discovers that imagination can make anything enjoyable. Song: "On My Own"
24	24	"The Real Number One"	Jason Groh	Jaya Ramdath	December 6, 2021	2524	N/A
Thomas's confidence in being the number 1 engine is challenged when his number is covered in paint, and he gets delayed several times while delivering lanterns. With some help from his friends, though, he learns that he is the number one engine due to his reliability.
25	25	"Roller Coasting"	Jason Groh & Sean Jeffrey	Jeff Goode	December 13, 2021	2525	N/A
A carnival arrives on Sodor and the roller coaster is leaving Percy in a very nervous fit, leaving Thomas, Nia, and Kana to help him get over his fear. When he goes through a number of lines likened to a roller coaster by his friends, though, Percy learns that a tough challenge can be prepared for by practicing it one part at a time. Song: "Everyone is Afraid a Little"
26	26	"No Power, No Problem!"	Campbell Bryer	Dan Salgarolo	December 20, 2021	2526	N/A
Thomas promises Annie and Clarabel a scenic route for one of the last tours of the summer season, but a power outage across the entire Island of Sodor causes problems for the three and their passengers. With help from Percy and Kana, the engines learn that what connects all of them isn't just electricity.
27	27	"The Tiger Train"	Campbell Bryer	Brandon Violette	January 10, 2022	2528	N/A
On the day of a fireworks show, Yong Bao visits from China and performs a rescue, which leaves Thomas feeling jealous. The little blue engine sets out to prove himself braver with a dangerous stunt, but when he is joined by Yong Bao on a rescue mission, Thomas learns that bravery doesn't necessarily mean being fearless. Song: "What Brave Engines Do"
28	28	"Can-Do Submarine Crew"	Jason Groh & Sean Jeffrey	Adam Beechen	January 17, 2022	2529	N/A
Gordon is unable to deliver a submarine to the Vicarstown Museum of History, so Thomas and Percy volunteer themselves for the task. However, despite the duo's collective confidence in their communication skills, the submarine proves to be a trickier delivery than anticipated, particularly with Harold.
29	29	"Eggsellent Adventure"	Jason Groh & Sean Jeffrey	Brent Piaskoski	January 24, 2022	2530	N/A
A bake-off is taking place at Vicarstown, and Thomas is tasked with delivering the necessary ingredients, but the journey is full of bumps and turns, causing many of the ingredients to become ruined. With Percy's help, Thomas puts into practice that some plans don't have to be taken from the start. Song: "Between You and Me"
30	30	"Calliope Crack-Up"	Campbell Bryer	Sarah Eisenberg & Becky Wangberg	January 31, 2022	2531	N/A
The engines are tasked with delivering carnival supplies, but a number of slip-ups result in a broken calliope and the loss of the carnival's main source of music. As the five make haste to fix whatever problems arose from the slip-ups, they find that they can perfectly fill in for the calliope.
31	31	"Tyrannosaurus Wrecks"	Campbell Bryer	Christopher Gentile	February 7, 2022	2532	N/A
A paleontologist has dug up a T-Rex skeleton in the old mines, and the Biggest Adventure Club are tasked with delivering it. However, they arrive out of order, and the skeleton is incomprehensibly jumbled until they figure out how to maintain the order the pieces were left in. Song: "Feet, Tailbone, Ribs and Claws"
32	32	"The Super-Long Shortcut"	Jason Groh & Sean Jeffrey	Peter Gaffney	February 14, 2022	2533	N/A
Gordon suffers two consecutive mechanical failures on a brick delivery and is at risk of running late, but when Thomas offers to help, the elder and younger engines constantly bicker about directions, causing them to get lost and delay the delivery further.
33	33	"A Light Delivery"	Jason Groh & Sean Jeffrey	Niki Lytton	February 21, 2022	2534	N/A
On the day of a light festival on Sodor, the engines spur on and encourage a race between Thomas and Diesel, causing Thomas to break one of the fragile multi-colored lights. When he lies about it, he only feels worse, and learns from Gordon that being honest will always be the best way to do things. Song: "The Number One Engine"
34	34	"The Paint Problem"	Campbell Bryer	Andy Yerkes	February 28, 2022	2535	N/A
Thomas learns about patience the hard way when he continually leaves his shed impatiently before his paint dries, extending his waiting time and causing him to miss out on a meteor shower. However, he learns that good friends can make a great impact on a bad situation.
35	35	"Wonderful World"	Campbell Bryer	Lexie Kahanovitz	March 7, 2022	2536	N/A
Thomas, Nia, and Diesel lose a delivery of orange trees meant for a new plaza at Vicarstown, and have to hunt down replacement plants for the grand opening. On the way, Nia shows the others that there's always something amazing when looking close enough. Song: "What's Awesome About This Place"
36	36	"Whistle Woes"	Sean Jeffrey	Sarah Eisenberg & Becky Wangberg	March 14, 2022	2537	N/A
An incident involving Diesel and the Troublesome Trucks results in Thomas making bird sounds whenever he blows his whistle, causing him to feel like a stranger until he gets it fixed. He does, however, learn that he is still himself, even without his whistle.
37	37	"Letting Off Steam"	Sean Jeffrey	Sarah Eisenberg & Becky Wangberg	March 21, 2022	2538	N/A
Nia has to help Thomas and Percy deal with an argument between the two, and teaches them that letting off steam can help cope with frustration. Song: "Blowing Off Steam"
38	38	"Nia's Perfect Plan"	Campbell Bryer	Peter Gaffney	March 28, 2022	2539	N/A
Nia makes an ambitious plan to make three big deliveries at once, but doggedly refuses to deviate even when trouble shows up. After coming clean, she learns that while having a plan is good, it is best to go with a different one should an obstacle come up.
39	39	"Something to Remember"	Campbell Bryer	Patrick Rieger	April 4, 2022	2540	N/A
The last day of Yong Bao's visit to Sodor comes much too fast for the other engines' liking, who are convinced he'll forget them without a souvenir. When they fail in this task, however, they learn that nobody is forgotten permanently, and that there will be other chances for Yong Bao to visit. Song: "A Gift to Remember"
40	40	"Sandy Versus the Storm"	Sean Jeffrey	Jordan Gershowitz	April 11, 2022	2541	0.07
Sandy is annoyed that the other engines take her and Carly's help for granted, but when she breaks down and the other engines need immediate repairs, they quickly realize how essential the Fix-it Crew are to their daily operations.
41	41	"An UnbeLEAFable Day"	Sean Jeffrey	Ghia Godfree	April 18, 2022	2542	N/A
The engines are thrilled to be setting up for the Fall Festival- except for Thomas, who still pines for the summer season. With the help of the others, however, he learns that although it isn't his favorite season, fall still has plenty of fun for him to enjoy. Song: "Fall Fun"
42	42	"A Rusty Rescue"	Campbell Bryer	Niki Lytton	April 25, 2022	2543	N/A
Thomas throws out Diesel's favorite oil can after getting his wheels greased, but when Diesel learns of this he becomes determined to find it. The search goes for several fruitless moments before the can is revealed to be safe, and Thomas learns that everything has sentimental value to someone; even an object that seems all but useless. Song: "My Rusty Can"
43	43	"Ghost Train"	Campbell Bryer	Eva Konstantopoulos	May 2, 2022	2544	N/A
On Halloween night, Percy fears that a ghost train will come after him during his mail run, so Thomas offers to join him. As the duo scare each other with their imaginations, however, they discover that some things aren't actually scary when looked at more closely.
44	44	"Hide and Surprise!"	Sean Jeffrey	Lexie Kahanovitz	May 10, 2022	2545	0.08
Diesel is doggedly determined to win a hiding game against Percy, but this comes to bite him when he gets stuck on a barge floating out to sea. After returning to shore, he learns that winning a game isn't worth the risk of being lost forever.
45	45	"Pop a Wheelie"	Sean Jeffrey	Susan Kim	May 17, 2022	2546	0.06
After Gordon ends up crashing, Thomas and Diesel have to take an important delivery to the docks. However, a friendly competition leads to Diesel losing a wheel, and the duo learn that not only is teamwork the better option, but a contest isn't fun when you take it too seriously. Song: "Together We Can"
46	46	"Goodbye, Ghost-Scaring Machine"	Campbell Bryer	Andy Yerkes	May 23, 2022	2547	0.09
Percy opts to recycle his Ghost-Scaring Machine after growing out of his long-rooted fear of ghosts. However, on their way to Lookout Mountain, the group finds that it has plenty more uses outside of its intended purpose.
47	47	"More Cowbell"	Campbell Bryer	Sarah Eisenberg & Becky Wangberg	May 31, 2022	2548	0.09
While out near the farm, Thomas discovers a cowbell on the tracks and decides to share it with his friends, but quickly grows sour over it not returning. After the confusion gets cleared up, the others learn that while it is nice to share, it only works well when the borrowed object is returned in the end. Song: "He Should Have Given You Back"
48	48	"Sir Topham Hatt's Hat"	Sean Jeffrey	Denise Downer	June 6, 2022 (Note: This episode was first released on the Cartoon Network app and video-on-demand services on June 3, 2022.)	2549	0.07
Sir Topham Hatt is retiring his old top hat as a museum exhibit and promises an exciting event once the deed is done. However, it is quick to be blown away by the wind, and to Nia's annoyance her friends are too busy competing to catch it to think of a plan.
49	49	"Nia's Surprising Surprise"	Sean Jeffrey	Michael White	June 13, 2022	2550	0.07
On the anniversary of Nia's arrival to Sodor, she plans on inviting everybody to a party, but to her disappointment everyone has seemingly forgotten about the occasion and are acting strangely. Eventually, she finds that they did remember and have been preparing a secret surprise party, and learns that things aren't always what they seem, especially on a special occasion. Song: "Celebrate"
50	50	"A New View for Thomas"	Campbell Bryer	Jaya Ramdath	June 20, 2022	2551	0.06
Harold's main rotor stalls in mid-flight, so Thomas has to take him for repairs by rail. While he is initially envious of the helicopter for his ability to see things from far away, he learns to appreciate who he is when the helicopter shows his amazement at things from an engine's point of view, and the two bond through a tour of Sodor as they make their way to Vicarstown.
51	51	"Skiff Sails Sodor"	Campbell Bryer	Daniel Share-Strom	June 27, 2022	2552	0.06
A race with Diesel and one of the Troublesome Trucks results in Skiff cracking his hull, leaving Thomas, Sandy, and Carly to take him to Harwick before the repair shop closes. Unfortunately, he gets sick on flat tracks, and Thomas gets sick on bumps, making the journey for both difficult.
52	52	"Song of Sodor"	Sean Jeffrey	Craig Carlisle	July 5, 2022	2553	N/A
Sir Topham Hatt makes a big ceremony out of the installation of a new bench, but it is so ordinary that the occasion seems pointless. He eventually tasks Nia with making a song about it on her suggestion, but it takes numerous thoughts before she finds something special about a normally mundane object. Song: "Song of Sodor"

=== Season 2 (2022–23) ===
No. overall	No. in season	Title	Directed by	Written by	Original release date	Prod. code	U.S. viewers (millions)
53	1	"Percy Disappears"	Sean Jeffrey	Peter Gaffney	September 12, 2022	2601	N/A
Thomas is celebrating his 10,000th delivery and encounters Percy on his way to the Docks, but while travelling the two get separated, and as Thomas ignored him earlier, he has a hard time trying to find him. Upon reuniting, Percy realizes that Thomas actually does listen at times, while Thomas makes sure to do so more often in the future.
54	2	"Shake, Rattle, & Bruno"	Campbell Bryer	Daniel Share-Strom	September 12, 2022 (Note: This episode was first uploaded to the Thomas & Friends YouTube channel on September 7, 2022.)	2602	0.09
Diesel is accompanied by Bruno while hauling a replacement light system for the Vicarstown lighthouse, but the pair struggling to communicate leads to both of them getting stranded in Crumble Canyon, with cooperation being their only hope of getting out. Song: "You Can't Stop Me"
55	3	"Fast Friends"	Campbell Bryer	Sarah Eisenberg & Becky Wangberg	September 19, 2022	2603	0.08
On the day of the Vicarstown "Fish Day" event, Nia is determined to get there fast, but it ends up frightening the fish. With the help of Kana, she realizes that even if you go slow, being smart always helps in reaching a destination on time. Song: "Fast to Go Slow"
56	4	"Ashima's Amazing Arrival"	Sean Jeffrey	Niki Lytton	September 26, 2022	2604	N/A
Thomas is determined to make a lasting impression for Ashima on the first day of her visit to Sodor, but to his annoyance his plans always fall apart in practice. When they settle on an improvised plan, Thomas learns that nothing has to be particularly grandiose to leave a good impression. Song: "Welcome to Sodor"
57	5	"Tri-and-a-Half-a-Lon"	Campbell Bryer	Denise Downer	October 3, 2022	2605	N/A
During the new Tri-and-a-Half-a-Lon run, the engines are set to have some fun as they complete the event's stunts, but Nia gets so determined to beat the timer that she neglects to enjoy the event and ends up exhausted from training too hard, learning that trying to have fun is more important than winning when it comes to a game.
58	6	"Carly's Magnificent Magnet"	Campbell Bryer	Jordan Gershowitz	October 10, 2022	2606	0.08
Sandy gives Carly a brand-new electromagnet to help in their job of assisting Tess in unloading Bulstrode at Kellsthorpe, but when he arrives early, Carly is forced to learn on the job. Despite the restrictions of Tess's impatient behavior, Carly learns that mistakes are a natural part of learning, and nothing to be dwelt upon. Song: "A Mistake is What it Takes"
59	7	"New Mail Engine in Town"	Campbell Bryer	Lexie Kahanovitz	October 17, 2022	2607	N/A
A broken axle forces Percy to rely on Nia to deliver the current and next day's mail, but he feels like he's being replaced when she finishes much faster than him. As he goes along his route, he tries finding another job after seeing how early Nia came with her deliveries, but learns that he will never be replaced permanently in his favorite job, especially when everyone he knows prefers his way.
60	8	"Hot Air Percy"	Campbell Bryer	Aydrea Walden	October 24, 2022	2608	N/A
Thomas and Percy have to deliver a hot air balloon to a festival at Norramby Beach, but after unexpected obstacles force the balloon to prematurely inflate, it snags up Percy and sends him skywards, forcing Thomas to coordinate a team rescue effort. The pair also learn that even the unexpected can be enjoyable once you let it go with the flow. Song: "This Was Unexpected"
61	9	"Carly's Screechy Squeak"	Campbell Bryer	John Loy	October 31, 2022	2609	0.09
Carly's crane arm begins squeaking after sand gets in the joints, causing the engines much grief as she tries to help them. While Sandy tries to fix it, she ends up getting carried away with making the machine larger, and it ends up making a slippery mess everywhere except where it's needed. Once the situation is fixed, Sandy learns that a solution is only a good one if it is applied in moderation.
62	10	"Blackout!"	Campbell Bryer	Brent Piaskoski	November 7, 2022	2610	N/A
When Sodor gets hit by a thunderstorm that causes an island-wide blackout, Thomas is tasked with delivering a generator to mitigate the damage, but his insistence at going solo forces him to learn the hard way that doing a hard task by yourself is not always the best idea.
63	11	"Brand New Track"	Campbell Bryer	Peter Gaffney	November 14, 2022	2611	0.09
When a brand new line is being built as an extension to Cronk, Thomas and Percy's eagerness to take a ride on it gets ahead of themselves, resulting in the two engines getting stuck in the mud. After spending the whole night stuck, they learn that when you take a closer look at things that you have already seen before, they can be truly amazing. Song: "Stuck in the Mud at Night"
64	12	"Stink Monster"	Campbell Bryer	Sarah Eisenberg & Becky Wangberg	November 21, 2022	2612	N/A
When Thomas and his friends have to pick up trash from Norramby Beach and deliver it to Whiff's Recycling Plant, all of them are in for a shock when a very strange stink monster takes Percy. Upon realizing that the monster is actually their good friend Whiff, they all learn that even when some things may seem confusing, it's always good to stay curious.
65	13	"Whiteout!"	Campbell Bryer	Niki Lytton	November 28, 2022	2613	0.07
Due to the winter storm, Gordon cancels all deliveries. However, Thomas and Percy continue to deliver the mail, learning they should use all of their senses to make their way around the island during the blizzard.
66	14	"Christmas Mountain"	Campbell Bryer	Lexie Kahanovitz & Monique Moreau	December 5, 2022 (Note: This episode was first released on the Cartoon Network app and video-on-demand services on November 28, 2022.)	2614	N/A
When the Christmas tree is unable to be delivered, Thomas, knowing how important traditions are to Bruno, looks around the island for a replacement tree. When they can't find one, the engines work together to decorate Lookout Mountain into the ultimate Christmas tree. Song: "Christmas Spirit"
67	15	"Good as New"	Campbell Bryer	Susan Kim	December 12, 2022	2615	0.06
Thomas, unable to accept Boxy is old and has run his course, tries to find a way to fix him, however fails. Together with Carly, Sandy, Percy, and Whiff though, Thomas is able to rethink his plan and make Boxy good as new! Song: "Good as New"
68	16	"More Than a Pretty Engine"	Campbell Bryer	Jaya Ramdath	December 19, 2022	2616	N/A
After a big storm hits the island leaving debris everywhere, Thomas and his friends must clear a huge rockslide at Crumble Canyon. Despite the engine's doubts, Ashima comes along with them to help with any problems they may run into. With her friends being so cautious about her paint, they don't allow to do dirty work in order to avoid her paint getting messy. After Ashima saves everyone after they get trapped in the mud, they learn that somebody's abilities are more important, rather than looks.
69	17	"Snowplow Struttin'"	Campbell Bryer	Niki Lytton	December 26, 2022	2617	N/A
When Sir Topham Hatt predicts a snowfall on the island, he assigns Thomas, Percy, and Diesel to deliver supplies to the lighthouse. When Thomas brings his shiny, blue snowplow, he carelessly plows everything in the engines' path, leading to the tracks being blocked by pigs. Upon learning that Thomas can use his snowplow to move the pigs out of the way, he learns that while it's good to have fun, you shouldn't let it distract you from an important job. Song: "Plow to Have Fun on the Job"
70	18	"Thomas in Charge"	Campbell Bryer	Andy Yerkes	January 2, 2023	2618	0.06
When Gordon must go to the far side of the island for the day, he assigns Thomas to be in charge of his friends assignments. After not listening to Gordon, Thomas gets him and his friends in serious trouble. He assigns Percy the rush mail shipment that goes over the Sodor Suspension Bridge, Nia with heavy stone, Kana with a passenger run, and Diesel with really light pillows. As none of these jobs suit the engines, there are problems with their deliveries, eventually resulting in a big crash. Upon taking the time to listen to his friends, he learns that jobs will only go smoothly if you listen to your crew.
71	19	"Kana Recharges"	Campbell Bryer	Aydrea Walden	January 9, 2023	2619	N/A
After finishing their last deliveries for the day, Thomas is shocked when Kana says that she needs some alone time to relax. He jumps to the conclusion that Kana is upset and he along with the other engines try many things to make her feel better. After many attempts from her friends to cheer her up including swarms of butterflies, train tag, and train washes, Kana becomes angry and shouts at her friends. Upon thinking that Kana no longer wants to be friends with them, the dismayed engines play a sad game of train tag. When finally getting some time to herself, Kana notices that there is a storm coming and fears that her friends will get caught in it. She quickly finds them and gets them to safety in a nearby tunnel just in time. After her friends take a bit of time to listen, Kana teaches them that while having fun is always nice, it's always good to emotionally recharge and appreciate the quiet things in life sometimes. Song: "Feel the Hush"
72	20	"The Big Skunk Funk"	Campbell Bryer	Tracy Nicoletti	January 16, 2023	2620	0.10
It's the day of the Vicarstown Flower Festival and the engines are very excited. Thomas is the most excited of all as he gets the honor of taking Sir Topham Hatt's prized roses. However, with the roses being very delicate, Thomas must do the job very slowly. The journey goes quite smoothly from the start, but trouble soon arises when Thomas gets sprayed by a skunk. He fears that everyone is going to think that it's the roses that stink and quickly rushes to the Maintenance Yard to see if Sandy and Carly can help. After hearing that the new train wash Sandy is building to fix the problem won't be ready until that afternoon, Thomas tries his best to find a different solution. It is certainly easier said then done, as none of his planned solutions to get rid of the harsh smell work. After waiting for Sandy's train wash to be ready and finally washing the smell away, he learns that the best solutions to big problems come when you are patient and take your time.
73	21	"Off the Rails"	Campbell Bryer	Peter Gaffney	January 23, 2023	2621	0.05
When Whiff gives Nia the task of delivering a big earth ball to Norramby Beach, she completely plans out the route she is gonna take and thinks that the job will be very easy. She is soon proven wrong, as her plan is disrupted by a boulder runaway at Crumble Canyon. She goes to Lookout Mountain to try to find a better route, but all of the lines that go towards the beach are blocked. Something completely unexpected happens when the straps on her flatbed snap and the earth ball bounces around all over the island. Nia tries her best to catch it, but it is no use, after talking with Thomas and taking help from Skiff, she learns that sometimes you just have to go with the flow, rather than sticking to a specific plan. Song: "The World Has a Mind of Its Own"
74	22	"Diesel's Dilemma"	Campbell Bryer	Lexie Kahanovitz	January 30, 2023	TBA	N/A
Diesel, who is known as one of the strongest engines on Sodor, is tired of just pulling heavy loads. He finds that he can relate to Kenji, the fastest engine in the world, who is visiting Sodor to help out while Kana is being repaired, and is tired of being known for just being fast. The two decide to switch jobs, with Diesel taking Kenji's passenger train and Kenji taking Diesel's mining equipment. This isn't a good idea though, as neither of them are suited for jobs, resulting in Diesel getting stuck in a mud pit and Kenji getting stuck in the mine. Once they're both back on track, they learn that while doing what you're good at is wise, it never hurts to try new things, as long as it doesn't get you into danger.
75	23	"A Very Percy Valentine's Day"	Campbell Bryer	Allan Neuwirth	February 6, 2023	TBA	N/A
It's Valentine's Day and Percy is determined to get the valentines mail delivered all around the island. Despite the large amount, he manages to get all of his deliveries done, alongside taking some additional requests from his friends. Trouble soon arises for the green engine, as him not paying attention to the tracks results in all of his friend's gifts getting sunk into the mud. In the words of a song though, him and his friends learn that most gifts should come from the heart, rather than a box. Song: "What's Really Real"
76	24	"Valentine's Heart"	Campbell Bryer	Susan Kim	February 13, 2023	TBA	N/A
The biggest adventure club is throwing a Valentine's Day party on Lookout Mountain, and they are all gathering up things to bring. That is, except for Kana, who is deeply unsure on what she should contribute. After a long chase after a runaway homemade heart, she realizes that the best thing she could ever bring to a party, is herself.
77	25	"Bring it on Beresford"	Campbell Bryer	Denise Downer	February 20, 2023 (Note: This episode was first aired in Canada on November 27, 2022)	TBA	0.06
It's Plant-A-Tree day on Sodor and Sir Topham Hatt assigns Thomas, Percy, Nia, Kana, and Diesel to deliver trees all over the island. There is soon a problem though, as Bulstrode shows up carrying a huge tree that Gordon was supposed to take along with his other tree deliveries. Hearing that the delivery will make them known as famous, Thomas and Diesel decide to compete, whoever gets their deliveries done first will be who gets to take the big tree to Vicarstown. The two race all around the island, causing mayhem everywhere, in the end, Thomas wins the big tree delivery. Diesel follows so that he can take over if Thomas messes up. They try all the routes to Vicarstown but none work as the tree is too tall. The eventually come to a steep mountain, but with the windy weather the tree falls over knocking both of them off the tracks into a mud pit, even Carly and Sandy who had come along and tried to help. Thankfully, Beresford comes to their rescue revealing that he was following them to see if they needed his assistance. With his help, they get the tree delivered on time, and Thomas and Diesel both learn that you should always try to focus on your strengths, rather than your weaknesses. Song: "What I Can Do and What I Can't"
78	26	"What's in a Name?"	Campbell Bryer	John Loy	February 27, 2023	TBA	N/A
It's a busy day at Brendam Docks, cargo is scattered around everywhere, with Cranky being more overwhelmed than ever. Thomas and Percy come along to help him sort out the cargo and take the deliveries, along with Riff and Jiff, who are visiting the island. Due to Cranky's stress, he accidentally mixes up Riff and Jiff's deliveries, sending Riff's chickens to the recycling plant and Jiff's tires to McColl's Farm. Knowing that Cranky is a big crane and thinking that Cranky knows what he's doing, he sends the two along. Trouble soon comes though as the tires send the farm animals rolling across the island and the chickens are all scattered around the recycling plant. Thomas soon sorts it out and puts the cargo in the right places, and after talking with Cranky, he learns that mistakes are a part of life, even with adults, and when you see someone make one you should always speak up.
79	27	"Sheep Shenanigans"	Campbell Bryer	Tracy Nicoletti	May 8, 2023 (Note: This episode was first aired in Canada on December 4, 2022.)	227	0.06
The boys choose to take in a lamb from the farm for the evening, but this becomes chaotic for Diesel when the entire flock joins them at the sheds. Once everything is sorted, the engines learn that interacting with animals can Song: "Peep! Peep! We're Counting Sheep"
80	28	"Tunnel Troubles"	Campbell Bryer	Peter Hirsch	May 9, 2023	TBA	N/A
Thomas and Diesel are determined to win a race so that a new tunnel can be named after one of them, but the others want them to join them in watching a butterfly migration. After the pair forfeit, they learn that something such as a chance at glory does not come before being with friends.
81	29	"The Case of the Missing Crane"	Campbell Bryer	Shaun Avnet	May 10, 2023	TBA	0.07
When Carly does not return from saving Emily from an accidental derailing, a worried Sandy recruits the help of a bored Diesel to find her best gal pal. The unlikely pair become detectives. Song: "How to Solve a Mystery"
82	30	"Not-So-Secret Mission"	Campbell Bryer	Peter Gaffney	May 15, 2023	TBA	N/A
83	31	"Speedster Sandy"	Campbell Bryer	Jordan Gershowitz	May 16, 2023 (Note: This episode was first released on the Cartoon Network app and video-on-demand services on May 15, 2023.)	TBA	0.10
Song: "Sandy's Strengths"
84	32	"For All the Marble"	Campbell Bryer	Jonathan Hernandez	May 17, 2023	TBA	0.05
85	33	"Salty's Sea Shanty"	Campbell Bryer	Niki Lytton	May 22, 2023	TBA	N/A
Song: "The Sodor Shanty"
86	34	"Retrieve the Kraken"	Campbell Bryer	Aydrea Walden	May 23, 2023 (Note: This episode was first released on the Cartoon Network app and video-on-demand services on May 22, 2023.)	TBA	N/A
87	35	"Rocket's Fall"	Campbell Bryer	Peter Gaffney	May 24, 2023	TBA	N/A
Song: "When You Go to Sea"
88	36	"Details? What Details?"	Campbell Bryer	Brent Piaskoski	May 29, 2023	TBA	0.08
89	37	"Blue Engine Blues"	Campbell Bryer	Tracy Nicoletti	May 30, 2023	TBA	N/A
Song: "Blues Buddy"
90	38	"Hay Fort Frenzy"	Campbell Bryer	Susan Kim	May 31, 2023	TBA	0.11
91	39	"Percy in the Middle"	Campbell Bryer	Jordan Gershowitz	August 28, 2023 (Note: This episode was first aired in Canada on July 8, 2023.)	TBA	N/A
A potentially fun day gets ruined for Percy when an overly-competitive Thomas and Diesel force him to be the judge in all of their competitions. Eventually, he snaps under pressure, having had enough of the pair's poor sportsmanship. After making up, Thomas and Diesel learn that poor sportsmanship can ruin the days of more than just the competitors of a competition. Song: "Good Sports"
92	40	"Bad Luck Boxcar"	Campbell Bryer	Eva Konstantopoulos	September 4, 2023	TBA	N/A
When Thomas and Percy transport an unlucky boxcar of bananas, Thomas starts to have bad luck wherever he goes and must find a way to break the curse.
93	41	"Not So Easy-Greasy"	Campbell Bryer	John Loy	September 11, 2023 (Note: This episode was first aired in Canada on July 15, 2023.)	TBA	N/A
Song: "Work Together"
94	42	"It All Adds Up"	Campbell Bryer	Adam Beechen	September 18, 2023	TBA	N/A
95	43	"Bruno's Map Mishap"	Campbell Bryer	Lexie Kahanovitz & Monique Moreau	September 25, 2023 (Note: This episode was first aired in Canada on July 22, 2023.)	TBA	N/A
Song: "Friendship Map"
96	44	"Seeking a Safer Sodor"	Campbell Bryer	Peter Gaffney	October 2, 2023	TBA	N/A
97	45	"A Cranky Goodbye"	Campbell Bryer	Sarah Eisenberg & Becky Wangberg	October 9, 2023 (Note: This episode was first aired in Canada on July 29, 2023.)	TBA	N/A
Song: "Talking Makes It Better"
98	46	"Sameroo"	Campbell Bryer	Adam Lorenzo	October 16, 2023	TBA	N/A
99	47	"Thomas for a Day"	Campbell Bryer	Traci Nicoletti	October 23, 2023	TBA	N/A
Song: "Take a Closer look"
100	48	"The Super Axle"	Campbell Bryer	Peter Hirsch	October 30, 2023 (Note: This episode was first released On Demand on ABC iview on July 24, 2023.)	TBA	N/A
101	49	"The Waiting Game"	Campbell Bryer	Daniel Share-Strom	November 6, 2023	TBA	N/A
Song: "The Waiting Game"
102	50	"All Wheels on Track"	Campbell Bryer	Diana Wright	November 13, 2023	TBA	N/A
103	51	"Something Broken, Someone Blue"	Campbell Bryer	Craig Carlisle	November 20, 2023	TBA	N/A
104	52	"The Sights of Sodor"	Campbell Bryer	Craig Carlisle	November 27, 2023	TBA	N/A
Song: "The Sights of Sodor"

=== Season 3 (2024) ===
All episodes are directed by Campbell Bryer.

No. overall	No. in season	Title	Written by	Original release date	Prod. code
105	1	"What's the Buzz?"	John Loy	March 7, 2024 (Note: This episode was first aired in Canada on February 3, 2024.)	TBA
Song: "Worth Doing Right"
106	2	"Bells are Ringing"	Tracy Nicoletti	March 7, 2024	TBA
107	3	"Abraca-Diesel"	Peter Gaffney	March 7, 2024 (Note: This episode was first aired in Canada on February 10, 2024.)	TBA
Song: "Abraca-Diesel"
108	4	"Overcommitted"	Becky Wangberg & Sarah Eisenberg	March 7, 2024	TBA
109	5	"Sandy's Fine Mess"	Adam Beechen	March 7, 2024 (Note: This episode was first aired in Canada on February 17, 2024.)	TBA
Song: "Stuff"
110	6	"Nia's Green Surprise"	Jaya Ramdath	March 7, 2024	TBA
111	7	"Duck Duck Whoosh!"	Allan Neuwirth	March 7, 2024 (Note: This episode was first aired in Canada on February 24, 2024.)	TBA
Song: "Instead"
112	8	"Choo-Choo Check In"	Leore Berris	March 7, 2024	TBA
113	9	"Percy's Little Problem"	Noelle Wright	March 7, 2024 (Note: This episode was first aired in Canada on March 2, 2024.)	TBA
Song: "I Wish"
114	10	"Fill-In Friend"	Eva Konstantopoulos	March 7, 2024	TBA
115	11	"Cake It Easy"	John Loy	March 7, 2024	TBA
Song: "Make Things Right"
116	12	"The Can-Do Crew"	Adam Lorenzo	March 7, 2024	TBA
117	13	"Pizza Picnic Problem"	Becky Wangberg & Sarah Eisenberg	March 7, 2024	TBA
Song: "Find A New Way"
118	14	"Travels with Terence"	Amber Harris	September 19, 2024 (Note: This episode was first aired in Canada on March 16, 2024.)	TBA
119	15	"Crab Crossing"	Peter Gaffney	September 19, 2024 (Note: This episode was first aired in Canada on May 11, 2024.)	TBA
Song: "Building Better for Everyone"
120	16	"Driving Winston"	John Loy	September 19, 2024	TBA
121	17	"The Slowest Race in the World"	Noelle Wright	September 19, 2024 (Note: This episode was first aired in Canada on May 18, 2024.)	TBA
Song: "Slow It on Down"
122	18	"Bruno's Blustery Day"	Daniel Share-Strom	September 19, 2024	TBA
123	19	"Night Lights"	Andy Yerkes	September 19, 2024 (Note: This episode was first aired in Canada on May 25, 2024.)	TBA
Song: "When the Night Comes On"
124	20	"For Love or Muddy"	Sam Bissonnette	September 19, 2024	TBA
125	21	"Percy's Duck Dilemma"	Peter Gaffney	September 19, 2024 (Note: This episode was first aired in Canada on June 1, 2024.)	TBA
Song: "Quackity Quack"
126	22	"All for the Nest"	Eva Konstantopoulos	September 19, 2024	TBA
127	23	"Winter Games"	John Loy	September 19, 2024 (Note: This episode was first aired in Canada on June 15, 2024.)	TBA
Song: "Winter Games"
128	24	"The Accidental Bad Guy"	Tracy Nicoletti	September 19, 2024	TBA
129	25	"Farmers Market...On Wheels!"	Carin Greenberg	September 19, 2024 (Note: This episode was first aired in Canada on June 29, 2024.)	TBA
130	26	"The Smells of Sodor"	Craig Carlisle	September 19, 2024	TBA
Song: "The Smells of Sodor"

=== Season 4 (2025) ===
All episodes are directed by Campbell Bryer.

No. overall	No. in season	Title	Written by	Original release date	Prod. code
131	1	"Sheep Stampede"	Kristen McGregor	April 10, 2025	TBA
Song: "Stay on Track with Yourself"
132	2	"The Berry Best"	Lexie Kahanovitz	April 10, 2025	TBA
133	3	"Creepy Crawly Courage"	Sam Bissonnette	April 10, 2025	TBA
Song: "The True You"
134	4	"Windmill Woes"	Brent Piaskoski	April 10, 2025	TBA
135	5	"Quacking Quandary"	Peter Gaffney	April 10, 2025	TBA
Song: "I Am A-Okay"
136	6	"The Stinking Delivery"	Becky Wangberg & Sarah Eisenberg	April 10, 2025	TBA
137	7	"Don't Train on My Parade"	Sam Bissonnette	April 10, 2025	TBA
Song: "Spring Start"
138	8	"Shiny Spiffy Sandy"	Carin Greenberg	April 10, 2025	TBA
139	9	"Diesel's Bad Day"	John Loy	April 10, 2025	TBA
Song: "Do Your Best"
140	10	"Moo-ving Friendship"	Tracy Nicoletti	April 10, 2025	TBA
141	11	"Art Engines Go!"	Sam Bissonnette	April 10, 2025	TBA
Song: "What I See"
142	12	"Lightening the Load"	Jonathan Hernandez	April 10, 2025	TBA
143	13	"Baaa-tastrophe!"	Kristen McGregor	April 10, 2025	TBA
Song: "Good Friends Will Help"
144	14	"Terence Time Out"	Amber Harris	September 11, 2025 (Note: This episode was first aired in Australia.)	TBA
145	15	"Postage Percy"	Jordan Gershowitz	September 11, 2025	TBA
Song: "Choo-Choo-Choose"
146	16	"A Crate Rescue"	Lexie Kahanovitz	September 11, 2025	TBA
147	17	"Chaos at Cronk's Crossing"	Craig Carlisle	September 11, 2025	TBA
148	18	"The Big Do-Over"	Craig Carlisle	September 11, 2025	TBA
Song: "The Do-Over Dance"
149	19	"Did I Miss It?"	Craig Carlisle	September 11, 2025	TBA
150	20	"No More Surprises"	Craig Carlisle	September 11, 2025	TBA
Song: "Surprise"
151	21	"Bruno to the Rescue"	Rick Suvalle	September 11, 2025	TBA
Song: "Nothing's Stopping Me Now"
152	22	"Kana's Last Minute Delivery"	Sarah Eisenberg & Becky Wangberg	September 11, 2025	TBA
153	23	"Goodnight Gordon"	Sam Bissonnette	September 11, 2025	TBA
Song: "Are You Asleep Yet?"
154	24	"Cronk's Crossing Conundrum"	Daniel Share-Strom	September 11, 2025	TBA
155	25	"Bridge Builders"	Peter Gaffney	September 11, 2025	TBA
156	26	"The Feels of Sodor"	Craig Carlisle	September 11, 2025	TBA
Song: "Sense of Sodor"

=== Specials ===
Five specials were produced for the series; all of these are directed by Campbell Bryer with Jason Groh co-directing "Race for the Sodor Cup".

==== Linear ====
No.	Title	Written by	Original release date	Prod. code	U.S. viewers (millions)
1	"Race for the Sodor Cup"	Peter Gaffney	December 27, 2021 (Note: This special was theatrically released in the United Kingdom on September 17, 2021.)	2527	N/A
Kana discovers that speed is not the only element a racer needs to win when a failed practice run forces Thomas to replace Kenji as her partner in the current Sodor Cup. As the 2nd run the course of the competition, she learns that when it comes to racing, it also helps to be patient, calm, and strategic. Guest stars: Humberly González as Farona, Thomas Santoro as Frederico, Addison Holley as Riff, and Evany Rosen as Jiff Note: The original UK release featured Bruce Dow as Sir Topham Hatt and the same voices for the special's new characters as the US release. Later releases in the UK replaced their lines with new ones, with Tom Dussek as Sir Topham Hatt, Matt Coles as Frederico, and Jessica Carroll as Riff, Jiff and Farona.
2	"The Mystery of Lookout Mountain"	Craig Carlisle & Daniel Share-Strom	April 3, 2023 (Note: This special was first aired in Canada on October 8, 2022.) (Note: This special was first released on Netflix in the US on April 1, 2023.)	TBA	0.04
When a mysterious rumbling in the mines scares off Thomas and Percy, the Biggest Adventure Club works together to solve the mystery.

==== Streaming ====
No.	Title	Written by	Original release date	Prod. code
3	"The Great Bubbly Build"	Niki Lytton	October 12, 2023 (Note: This special is a YouTube exclusive.)	TBA
4	"The Christmas Letter Express"	Rick Suvalle	November 21, 2024 (Note: This special was first aired in Canada on November 16, 2024.) (Note: This special was released on DVD in the United States on November 19, 2024.)	TBA
5	"Sodor Sings Together"	Craig Carlisle	October 16, 2025 (Note: This special was first aired in Australia on May 11, 2025.) (Note: This special was first released on Amazon Prime Video on July 17, 2025.)	TBA

== Production ==
In October 2020, Mattel Television formed a new co-production partnership with Corus Entertainment's Nelvana Limited and greenlit two new seasons for the Thomas & Friends series, consisting of 104 11-minute episodes and two hour-long specials. The new episodes were said to be produced using 2D animation and include more physical comedy and music than before.

Thomas & Friends: All Engines Go was officially announced on February 5, 2021. Executive producer Christopher Keenan said it was, "crafted to appeal to contemporary audiences' sensibilities while maintaining Thomas' core brand ethos".

On October 11, 2022, Mattel announced that the series was renewed for a third and fourth season, each consisting of 26 episodes and a special. On February 27, 2024, it was announced that Series 3 would debut on Netflix in the United States.

Unlike previous Thomas & Friends media, All Engines Go was produced in North America rather than the United Kingdom.

== Release ==
Cartoon Network and Netflix have the broadcast and streaming rights to the series in the United States. The series premiered on September 13, 2021, as part of Cartoon Network's Cartoonito preschool programming block. The series was made available to stream on Netflix on October 29, 2021.

Channel 5 (the UK terrestrial network that Season 8 onwards of the original show aired on) acquired the UK broadcast rights to the series and began airing it on their Milkshake! pre-school block on November 8, 2021, redubbed with British voice actors. On the same day, the first hour-long special, titled Race for the Sodor Cup was confirmed for a theatrical release on September 17, 2021, in order to introduce the series and the new look in the country. The series premiered in Canada on Treehouse on September 18, 2021.

In October 2021, Mattel Television announced they had pre-sold the series to many broadcasters around the world, including Nick Jr. for British pay-TV rights, TF1 in France and WarnerMedia for MENA and Latin American regions.

=== Home media ===
==== North America ====
On August 31, 2021, Mill Creek Entertainment and NCircle Entertainment's parent company Alliance Entertainment announced a US and Canadian distribution deal with Mattel. Such rights included the DVD rights to All Engines Go, which NCircle would distribute.

DVD name	Episodes	Season(s)	Release date	Source
Time for Teamwork!	8	1	December 7, 2021	
Race for the Sodor Cup	1	Special	March 8, 2022	
Best Friends	8	1	May 24, 2022	
Special Delivery	8	1	September 6, 2022	
Musical Fun!	8	1	January 31, 2023	
The Mystery of Lookout Mountain	1	Special	April 4, 2023	
Back on Track	8	2	July 25, 2023	
Brand New Track	8	2	September 12, 2023	
Off the Rails!	8	2	November 14, 2023	
All Wheels on Track	8	2	February 6, 2024	
It All Adds Up	10	2	May 28, 2024	
The Sights of Sodor	10	2	July 23, 2024	
The Christmas Letter Express	1	Special	November 19, 2024	

==== United Kingdom ====
The Race for the Sodor Cup special was released on DVD on February 14, 2022.

== Reception ==
Thomas & Friends: All Engines Go received generally negative reviews. The premiere of the series, along with trailers and other promotional material, were met with immense criticism from fans of the original series and parents, largely towards the new redesigns of the characters. Joly Herman at Common Sense Media summed up her review of the series by saying, "as cute, fun, adventurous as this series might be to young viewers, it has lost some of the character that the original show enjoyed."

Britt Allcroft, who produced the first seven series of Thomas & Friends, expressed disdain with All Engines Go, stating the series lacked the "magic" of the original series.

== Accolades ==
The series won Best Preschool Series in the inaugural Collision Awards in 2024.
