= Rolling stock of the Keighley & Worth Valley Railway =

The Rolling stock of the Keighley & Worth Valley Railway is used on the preserved Keighley & Worth Valley Railway, a 5-mile-long (8 km) branch line that served mills and villages in the Worth Valley and is now a heritage railway line in West Yorkshire, England. It runs from Keighley (Note: 53.8671°N 1.9003°W) to Oxenhope. (Note: 53.81503°N 1.9517°W) It connects to the national rail network line at Keighley railway station.

== Steam locomotives ==
=== Operational ===
Number & Name	Type	Photograph	Livery	Notes
No. 85	Taff Vale Railway O2 class 0-6-2T		TVR lined black	Number 85, along with other members of its class, was introduced to the Taff Vale Railway in 1899. At the grouping in 1923, the Great Western Railway received nine O2 class engines. They were all withdrawn during the 1920s, but No. 85 was bought by the Lambton Hetton & Joicey Colliery Co in Durham, numbered 52. It continued to work at the Philadelphia depot at Houghton-le-Spring until 1968. Number 85 arrived at KWVR at the end of 1970, but although a major restoration was not completed until 2000, where it was restored to original Taff Vale Railway condition for the first time in preservation. The boiler ticket expired in September 2009 and its overhaul was started soon afterwards because of the locomotive's popularity and good condition. The locomotive returned to service in February 2016 for the year's winter steam gala. Boiler ticket expires in 2026.
No. 41241	LMS 2-6-2T Class 2MT		K&WVR Maroon	No. 41241 was built at Crewe Works in 1949 and from there went to Bath Green Park shed (71G). After a few shorts spells at other sheds and transfer back to 71G, it was transferred to Wellington shed (84H) in October 1959. In 1964, No. 41241 was moved to Leamington Spa (2L), back to Wellington and to Wales, where it stayed at Bangor (6H) and Croes Newydd (6C). In 1965, No. 41241 went to Llandudno Junction shed (6G) for about 3 months before finally being transferred to Skipton (10G). It was withdrawn in December 1966, where it was taken under its own steam to its present home on the KWVR, where it was destined to haul the re-opening special. Its boiler 'ticket' expired on 20 January 2013, and was withdrawn from service for its 10-year overhaul. During the engine's overhaul it required extensive firebox work amongst many other required tasks. It returned to traffic during the KWVR's 50th anniversary gala in June 2018.
No. 45212	LMS Black Five 4-6-0		BR Lined Black with late crest	No. 5212 was built by Armstrong Whitworth's Newcastle works, and entered traffic in November 1935, with its home being Bradford Low Moor (25F), where it was often tasked with working Transpennine trains. In November 1947, No. 5212 moved to Fleetwood shed (24F), and in October of that year it was renumbered to become No. 45212. In October 1964, it was shedded at Carnforth (10A); moving in March 1965 to Speke Junction (8C); back to Carnforth in June 1965; to Carlisle Kingmoor (12A) in September 1965 and upon closure, to Lostock Hall (10D). No. 45212 was one of the last steam engines in regular service under British Rail. No. 45212 moved to the KWVR in October 1968.
No. 45596 "Bahamas"	LMS 4-6-0 Class 5XP Jubilee		BR Lined Green with late crest	Built in January 1935, No. 5596 was named 'Bahamas' without ceremony on 8 June 1936. It ran with both Stanier 4,000-US-gallon (15,000 L) and Fowler 3,500-US-gallon (13,000 L) tenders. It was renumbered to 45596 in 1948, in line with the rest of the BR renumbering at that time. In 1961, Bahamas was fitted with a double chimney. 45596 returned to steam for the first time in over 21 years in September 2018 following a Network Rail standard overhaul at Tyseley Locomotive Works. Following running in and its light and loaded test runs the engine returned to the KWVR in Feb 2019. 45596 returned to the K&WVR on 19 November 2022 after spending the year away working railtours.
No. 52044	L&YR Class 25 "Ironclad"; 0-6-0		BR unlined black with early emblem	Designed by Barton Wright for the Lancashire & Yorkshire Railway in 1875/6, No. 957 was delivered by Beyer, Peacock & Company in 1887. It was on the books of Goole Shed at grouping, when it became LMS No. 12044; and it remained there until January 1950 when British Rail moved it to Wakefield shed (25A). No. 957 was privately purchased from BR in 1959 and moved to KWVR in 1965 where it became famous for its role in The Railway Children. It was withdrawn from service in 1975 in need of a major overhaul and spent a significant amount of time on display in Oxenhope museum. The major overhaul was eventually started and 957 returned to service in 2001 wearing BR Black livery as No. 52044 before reverting to its L&Y guise of 957 a couple of years later. It was mainly used on summer vintage trains and during special events as well as the occasional normal passenger service. Its boiler certificate expired on 20 January 2013. Following a couple of years on display at Oxenhope, 957 moved back to Haworth in July 2016 with an overhaul completed in 2021. Boiler ticket expires in 2030.
No. 7232 "Ann"	Sentinel			No. 7232 was built by Sentinel in 1927 and is the oldest original Sentinel locomotive. It spent its entire working life at British Tar Products Limited in Manchester before being withdrawn in around 1969. It then moved to the Embsay and Bolton Abbey Railway where it was stored for many years. It was restored in 1998, and was withdrawn in 2005, where it remained in storage until it was bought by private individuals in 2020. It was restored at the East Lancashire Railway, entering service again in 2021. It moved to Haworth in December 2024.
No. 75078	BR 4-6-0 Class 4MT		BR lined black with late crest	No. 75078 was built at Swindon Works in 1956, one of 15 heading for the Southern Region. No. 75078 was withdrawn in 1966, but returned to service in February 2015 after more than 16 years out of traffic and then received a new ten-yearly boiler ticket in November 2022.
No. 78022	BR 2-6-0 Class 2MT		BR lined green with early crest	No 78022 was built at Darlington in 1954 and was first allocated to Millhouses Depot in Sheffield until 1962 when the depot closed. It then spent time at various locations such as Doncaster, Stratford, March and Aintree until being withdrawn from service in February 1967. It was then sent to Barry Scrapyard where it stayed until 1975 when it was purchased by the Standard 4 Locomotive Society and moved to Keighley. Its extensive restoration to service was completed in 1993 and it remained in service on the Worth Valley for ten years until its boiler ticket expired in 2003. It spent over ten years on display in the museum at Oxenhope until 2015 when it was moved to Haworth in 2015 for its overhaul to commence. This was completed in 2018.

==== Currently elsewhere ====
Number & Name	Description	Photograph	Livery	History and Current Status
No. 752 (51456)	L&YR Class 23 0-6-0ST		BR unlined black with early emblem	Built in 1881 by Beyer, Peacock & Company as works number 1989 for the Lancashire & Yorkshire Railway as a class 25 (similar to No. 957), it was rebuilt in its present form of an 0-6-0ST in 1896 at Horwich Works. Now as a class 23, it was a common site on both local goods and shunting turns. It was allocated to Wigan locomotive shed in 1921 and remained there until it was disposed of by the LMS in April 1937 (now numbered 11456) being loaned and then sold to the Blainscough Colliery Co Ltd, which was nationalised in 1947. It ran on NCB metals until 1968.
No. 1054	LNWR Webb Coal Tank; 0-6-2T		LNWR unlined black	Built at Crewe Works in September 1888. Built for freight work, these coal tanks were often used for local passenger trains, and some (including 1054) were fitted with push-pull equipment. From grouping, the LMS numbered it No. 7799. It was withdrawn in January 1939, although it was reinstated to traffic in December 1940 due to World War II. It was one of a fleet of 64 coal tanks passed from LMS to BR ownership, when it was renumbered 58926 and it was shedded in locations as varied as Bangor, Patricroft, Manchester, Bletchley, Edge Hill, Liverpool and Shrewsbury. In the mid-1950s, the locomotive was loaned to the National Coal Board, but had returned to British Rail by 1955. On its return, it was steamed only occasionally, predominantly for stand-by snow-plough duties until it was requested by the Stephenson Locomotive Society to double head a special train to mark the closure of the Abergavenny to Methyr route with 7F No. 49121. Bought by the former shedmaster of Bangor, Mr J. M. Dunn who restored it to LNWR condition with lined black. After a short stay at Hednesford, Staffordshire, it found itself donated to The National Trust who later loaned it to the Dinting Railway Centre who put it back into running order for the Rocket 150 celebrations in 1980.
No. 1210 "Sir Berkeley"	L Class Manning-Wardle			"Sir Berkeley" was built in 1891 by Manning-Wardle in Leeds, and was withdrawn in 1963, before arriving on the KWVR in 1965. It was later purchased by the Vintage Carriage Trust and Ingrow West, and is currently on loan to the Middleton Railway in Leeds.

=== Undergoing overhaul ===
Number & Name	Description	Photograph	Livery	History and Current Status
No. 5775	GWR 5700 Class 0-6-0PT		GN&SR Lined Ochre	Built for the Great Western Railway in September 1929 and worked at Neath shed in South Wales. At Nationalisation, it was at 87C shed – Danygraig, where it stayed until transfer to Carmarthen (87G) and finally to Pontypool Road (86G). Sold to London Transport in July 1963, numbered L89 and repainted in LT maroon livery. No. 5775 moved to KWVR in January 1970 where it starred as the locomotive that hauled the Old Gentleman's train in 'The Railway Children' film . In 2014, it was placed on loan to the National Railway Museum following cosmetic restoration at Shildon into its 'Railway Children' livery for the 45th anniversary of the film, returning to the line in November 2016.
No. 5820 "Big Jim"	USATC S160 Class; 2-8-0		USATC Grey	Built as works number 8758 by the Lima company of America in 1945, No. 5820 was shipped to Britain and then almost immediately to France to help with the World War II war effort. After the war had ended, it went to Polish Railways where it was numbered Tr203.474 and allocated to Katowice shed. During the 1970s, Polish steam was in decline while the British preservation movement was growing. No. 5820 was brought to Haworth in November 1977.
No. 90733	BR 2-8-0 Austerity		BR unlined black with late crest	Built at the Vulcan Foundry (No.5200), for the War Department (WD No. 79257), dispatched in January 1945. Shipped over to NSR Netherlands, No. 4464. Limited history in the Netherlands, but allocated to Rietlanden at the beginning of 1949, before moving to Eindhoven. Sold to Swedish State Railways in 1953, moved to Örebro works to have: new fully enclosed cab; electric lighting; shortening of tender (to enable it to fit Swedish turntables); renumbered Class G11 No. 1931. Mothballed with No. 1930 in 1958. Inspected in 1972 by KWVR, arrived at Ingrow 1973. After three years of operations, withdrawn 1976. Heavy overhaul began in 1993, completed 2007. Renumbered to the number subsequent to the last UK BR owned WD 2-8-0 – No. 90733 – returned to traffic. Boiler ticket originally due to expire in 2017 but later extended to April 2018. However, in December 2017 due to cracks being found in its boiler tubes, the decision was made to withdraw the loco as it was decided carrying out the repairs would not be economical with so little time left of the boiler ticket. As of July 2018 the engine is now being stripped down for overhaul.

=== Stored, static or on display ===
Number & Name	Description	Photograph	Livery	History and Current Status
No. 43924	Midland Railway 3835 Class; 0-6-0 (LMS Class 4F)		BR unlined black with late crest	Built in October 1920 at Derby Works, it was allocated to Wellingborough where it was deployed on coal trains to London and return of empty wagons. Allocated to Saltley Shed (21A) in March 1930; Gloucester Barnwood (22B) in July 1937; Bristol Barrow Road (82E) in September 1962; withdrawn in July 1965. Sold and transferred to Woodham Brothers in October 1965. Became the first locomotive in September 1968 to leave Barry scrapyard and earned a reputation as a reliable KWVR performer until it was withdrawn from service in December 1987. 43924 re-entered revenue-earning passenger service in July 2011 for the first time in nearly 25 years after an extensive overhaul. Boiler ticket expired in 2021.
No. 1704 "Nunlow"	Hudswell Clarke; 0-6-0T		Green	Built 1938 by Hudswell Clarke for the industrial railway connecting G&T Earle's cement works with the mainline at Hope on the Midland Railway's Hope Valley Line. Named Nunlow after a hill that stood on the works site. During the mid-1960s, role was taken over by diesel shunters. Taken to the Dinting Railway Centre in 1969, moved to KWVR in 1990.
No. 47279	LMS 0-6-0T Class 3F "Jinty"		BR Unlined Black with early crest	Built by the LMS following a previous Midland Railway design, the Jinties were mainstay locomotives on the Worth Valley in its pre-preservation years. No. 7119 left the Vulcan Foundry in 1924. Under the LMS 1934 renumbering scheme, it became No 7279 and finally at Nationalisation, it became 47279. This locomotive had an active life, and transferred between many areas and sheds in the LMS and later LMR. It was bought by Woodham Brothers Scrapyard, and arrived at their scrapyard in Barry in 1967. After 12 years rotting in the scrapyard, No 47279 arrived at Haworth in 1979. A very extensive restoration was carried out and 47279 entered service in February 1988.
No. 80002	BR 2-6-4T Class 4MT		BR Lined Black with early crest	Part of the first batch of 10 to be ordered by the Scottish Region from Derby Works, emerged in October 1952. Allocated to Motherwell shed (66B); moved to Polmadie (66A). Transferred to Beattock shed (68D) in June 1962.

=== Former Worth Valley Residents ===
Number & Name	Type	Photograph	Livery	History and Current Status
No. 30072	Class USA 0-6-0T		KWVR Brown	After World War II, the Southern Railway needed to replace ageing shunting engines at Southampton Docks. They decided to use the USATC built USA tanks. No. 30072 started life at the Vulcan Iron Works in 1943 as works number 4446. After 4 years, the Southern Railway bought it and 14 others of its class renumbering it No. 72. At nationalisation, 30,000 was added to the number (as was customary for southern engines), and it stayed at Southampton. In 1962, its duties were taken over by diesel shunting engines and No. 30072 was moved to Guildford (70C) shed. No. 30072 was purchased by Andy Booth (the current owner of L&YR Class 27 no 1300) in August 2015 and is presently stored inside the Ribble Steam Railway's museum awaiting a space in the workshop for its overhaul to commence. Once its overhaul is completed at the RSR it is planned to return on loan to the railway.
No. 34092 "City of Wells"	SR 4-6-2 West Country Class		BR lined green with early emblem	Built in March 1949, No. 34092 was a member of the final batch of 20 West Country Class locomotives ordered. It was based at Stewarts Lane (73A) until it was moved to Salisbury (72B). While at Stewarts Lane, it was named 'Wells' by the mayor of Wells on 25 November 1949.
No. 45025	LMS Black 5 4-6-0		LMS Lined Black	Following withdrawal from service with British Railways in 1968 which was later followed with an overhaul being undertaken at Hunslet in Leeds No. 45025 was moved by rail under its own power to the Keighley and Worth Valley Railway becoming one of the two preserved black 5's to be based on the railway (the second engine being 45212). The engine was based at the K&WVR from 1968 until 1974 when the engine was re-allocated to the Strathspey Railway in Aviemore, Scotland.

== Diesel locomotives and Multiple Units ==
=== Operational ===
Number & Name	Description	Photograph	Livery	Current Status
No. D2511	BR 0-6-0 British Rail Class D2/12		BR Green with wasp stripes	In use as the Carriage yard shunter at Oxenhope.
No. 32 "Huskisson"	Mersey Docks and Harbour Board Diesel Mechanical 0-6-0		Black	Back in service for the 2014 Diesel Gala after a long delayed overhaul. Occasionally operates shunting duties where required.
No. D0226 "Vulcan"	BR 0-6-0 Prototype EE shunter		BR Green	Used to operate the works train and occasional passenger service.
No. 08266 (ex 13336)	BR 0-6-0 Class 08		BR Departmental Grey	In use but restricted to Haworth yard duties as the locomotive is currently suffering from worn tyres. Appeared at 2008 diesel gala working shuttles between Keighley and Ingrow.
No. 08993 "Ashburnham"	BR 0-6-0 Class 08		EWS Maroon and Gold	Built in 1959 as No. D3759 and later 08592. The locomotive was later rebuilt with a cut down cab and body for use on the Burry Port and Gwendraeth Valley Railway. It was purchased by the KWVR in August 2015 as a replacement for No. 08266 and arrived in September that year. It returned to service following a light overhaul in June 2016. The loco is dual braked, making it useful for shunting air brake only vehicles.
No. 20031 (ex-D8031)	BR Bo-Bo Class 20		BR Green	Returned to traffic in September 2008 after a second main generator repair. Currently in the final stages of an overhaul.
No. 37075	Class 37		Railfreight Grey with full yellow ends	Built in 1962. Operational. The loco has two different types of nose end.
Nos. 51803+51189	BR Class 101 unit.		BR Blue	Returned to service in 2013 following restoration and now in regular use.
Nos. 55811+51834 (144011)	BR Class 144 unit.		MetroTrain red and cream	Built in 1986. 144011 was donated to the KWVR by its owners Porterbrook following its withdrawal from service with Northern in 2020. Because of the impact of the COVID-19 pandemic, the Class 144 units were withdrawn earlier than anticipated, and 144011 ended up being stored at Keighley along with several other members of the class. After its ownership was officially transferred, 144011 moved to Haworth MPD during August 2020.
No. 79964	BR Waggon und Maschinenbau Railbus		BR Green with yellow warning panels	In regular use on morning diesel services.

=== Out of service ===
Number & Name	Description	Photograph	Livery	Current Status
No. 25059 (ex-D5209)	BR Bo-Bo Class 25		BR Blue with full yellow ends	Built in 1963. Damaged by flooding caused by Storm Ciara in 2020 and withdrawn from service. Currently undergoing overhaul.
Nos. 50929+51565	BR Class 108		BR Green	Stored out of use at Haworth awaiting restoration
No. 79962	BR Waggon und Maschinenbau Railbus			Now owned by the Vintage Carriage Trust, undergoing overhaul and Ingrow West.
