= Horwich (disambiguation) =

Horwich may mean:

- Horwich, a town in Greater Manchester
  - Horwich Parkway railway station
  - Horwich RMI F.C., the former name of an English football club
  - Horwich Works, a former locomotive works
- LMS Horwich Mogul, a steam locomotive
- Horwich End, a locality of Whaley Bridge in Derbyshire
- Frances Horwich, a US children's television presenter
- Paul Horwich, a British analytic philosopher at New York University
