= L&YR Class 5 =

British steam locomotive class (1889–1961)

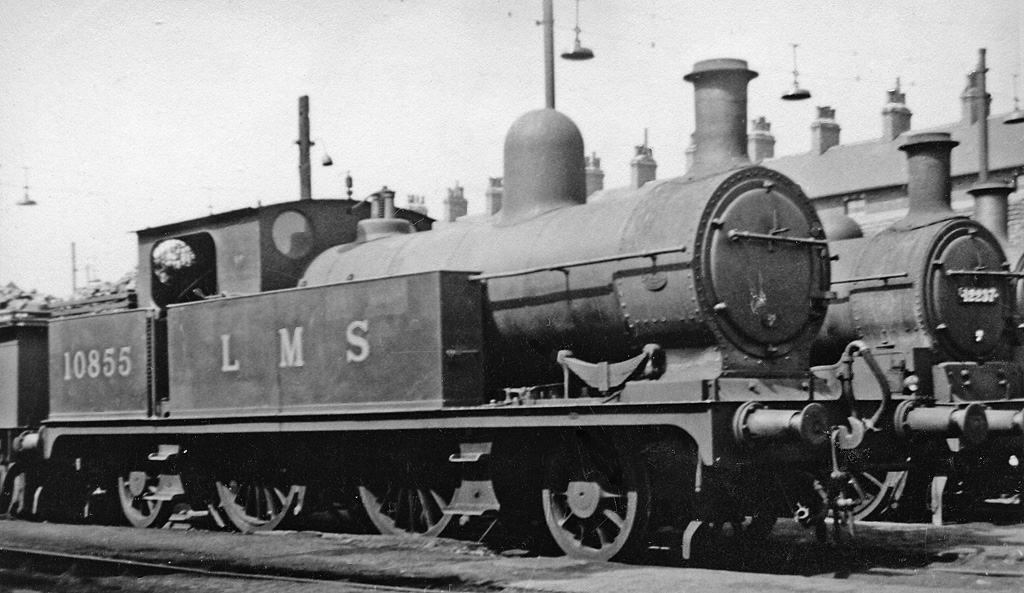
Type and origin
- Power type: Steam
- Designer: J. A. F. Aspinall
- Builder: Horwich Works
- Order number: Lots 1, 4, 11, 12, 16, 22, 27, 28, 30, 34, 35, 36, 38, 41
- Build date: 1889–1911
- Total produced: 310
Specifications
- Configuration
  - Whyte: 2-4-2T
  - UIC: 1′B1′ n2t
- Gauge: 4 ft 8 1/2 in (1,435 mm) standard gauge
- Leading dia.: 3 ft 7 3/4 in (1.111 m)
- Driver dia.: 5 ft 8 in (1.727 m)
- Trailing dia.: 3 ft 7 3/4 in (1.111 m)
- Length: 39 ft 2 1/2 in (11.9507 m)
- Loco weight: Short frame: 55.95 long tons (56.85 t; 62.66 short tons); Long frame: 59.15 long tons (60.10 t; 66.25 short tons)
- Fuel type: Coal
- Fuel capacity: Short frame: 2.00 long tons (2.03 t; 2.24 short tons); Long frame: 3.15 long tons (3.20 t; 3.53 short tons)
- Water cap.: Short frame: 1,340 imp gal (6,100 L; 1,610 US gal); Long frame: 1,540 imp gal (7,000 L; 1,850 US gal)
- Boiler pressure: 160 psi (1.10 MPa), some later 180 psi (1.24 MPa)
- Heating surface: 1,216.4 sq ft (113.01 m^{2})
- Cylinders: Two, inside
- Cylinder size: Lots 1 & 4: 18 in × 26 in (457 mm × 660 mm); Remainder: 17 1/2 in × 26 in (444 mm × 660 mm)
- Valve gear: Joy
- Valve type: Slide valves
Performance figures
- Tractive effort: 16,848–19,496 lbf (74.9–86.7 kN)
Career
- Operators: Lancashire and Yorkshire Railway; → London, Midland and Scottish Railway; → British Railways
- Class: L&YR: 5
- Power class: LMS/BR: 2P
- Number in class: 1 January 1923: 278; 1 January 1948: 110
- Numbers: LMS: 10621–10954
- Locale: London Midland Region
- Withdrawn: 1927–1961
- Disposition: One preserved, remainder scrapped

L&YR Class 6
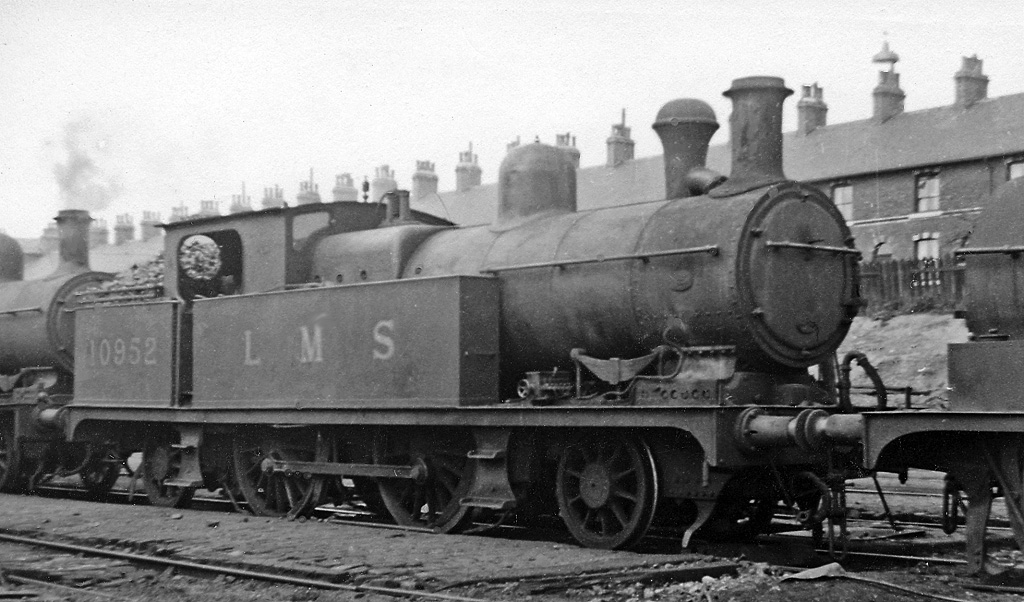
- 3P Radial 2-4-2T with superheated Belpaire boiler and large bunker at Low Moor depot in 1947
Type and origin
- Power type: Steam
- Designer: G. Hughes
- Builder: Horwich Works
- Build date: 1911–1914
- Total produced: New 20, rebuilds 44, total 64
Specifications
- Configuration
  - Whyte: 2-4-2T
  - UIC: 1′B1′ h2t
- Leading dia.: 3 ft 7 3/4 in (1.111 m)
- Driver dia.: 5 ft 8 in (1.727 m)
- Trailing dia.: 3 ft 7 3/4 in (1.111 m)
- Loco weight: 66 long tons (67 t) or 60 long tons (61 t)
- Boiler pressure: 180 lbf/in^{2} (1.24 MPa)
- Cylinder size: 20 1/2 in × 26 in (521 mm × 660 mm), some conversions 19 1/2 in × 26 in (495 mm × 660 mm)
Performance figures
- Tractive effort: 24,585 lbf (109.4 kN), 19.5" conversions 22,245 lbf (99.0 kN)
Career
- Power class: LMS: 3P

The Lancashire and Yorkshire Railway Class 5 were 2-4-2T steam locomotives designed by Chief Mechanical Engineer (CME) John Aspinall and introduced from 1889 for local passenger work. Later batches included progressive modifications such as extended coal bunkers and Belpaire fireboxes. The final batch built from 1911 to 1914 under George Hughes incorporating superheated boilers gave increased tractive effort, others were also rebuilt to this standard. When Hughes introduced his classification system in 1919, the more powerful superheated locomotives were designated Class 6. The final examples were withdrawn in 1961.

== Development ==
=== Aspinall ===
John Aspinall was from the Great Southern and Western Railway (GS&WR) of Ireland, and had succeeded Barton Wright in 1886 with the goal of continuing Wright's policy of standardisation on a minimum number of locomotive classes. Aspinall built more of slightly modified versions of Wright's 0-6-0 and 4-4-0 designs but was concerned with some aspects of the 0-4-4T design used for local passenger duties. Aspinall disliked unguided leading wheels as they could give rise to excessive flange wear and rough riding though neither the L&YR 0-4-4Ts nor the GS&WR's 0-4-4BTs had given problems. Having determined on a larger 2-4-2T design he reviewed best practice from contemporary designs including Webb's LNWR 4ft 6in Tank Class, proposed 5ft 6in 2-4-2Ts and Worsdell's 2-4-2T. The design incorporated Joy valve gear and Webb's radial axle box.

The design emerged on as 20 February 1889 and was the first locomotive built at Horwich Works. The early locomotives had 18-by-26-inch (457 mm × 660 mm) cylinders for a tractive effort of 18,955 lbf (84.32 kN) and power class 2P. Some later-built locomotives from 1893 had smaller diameter cylinders of 17 inches (432 mm) for a tractive effort of 18,360 lbf (81.67 kN). The original coal bunker capacity was of 2 tons. 270 were built in total.

In 1895 after noting current practice elsewhere, Aspinall switched to using balanced Richardson slide valves in lieu of the ordinary slide valves that the 1887 experiments of the GS&WR's Robert Coey had endorsed in 1887. The reported feedback results were reduced wear, very slight decrease in coal consumption, freer running, and stronger running. (Note: Some of these characteristics might be found in any locomotive exiting maintenance)

After 210 engines had been built, No. 5 of lot 36 in 1898 was completed with long frames and an increased coal capacity of 3 long tons 3 cwt (7,100 lb or 3.2 t) in a distinctly longer coal bunker at the back. Water capacity increased to 1,540 imp gal (7,000 L) and the overall weight to 59 long tons 3 cwt (132,500 lb or 60.1 t), with maximum axle load now 17 long tons 8 cwt (39,000 lb or 17.7 t). The total length increased to 39 feet 2 1/4 inches (11.944 m) while the wheelbase remained unchanged. All subsequent builds were to use long frames.

=== Hoy and Druitt Halpin experiments ===
Hoy had been Works Manager at Horwich since 12 April 1887, and on Aspinall's appointment to L&YR General Manager on 1 June 1899 Hoy was promoted to CME.

One locomotive, 632, was rebuilt by Hoy in 1902 with an experimental Druitt Halpin thermal storage apparatus. Similar in some respects to a Flaman boiler, this resembled a second short boiler drum atop the normal drum, in place of the dome. Other locomotives: 1015, 1164, 1315, 1335 & 1375 were similarly fitted in 1905. Henry Ivatt also experimented with a similar device on a GNR 2-4-0. Neither appears to have been successful and after problems with mud and scale build-up, Hughes had them removed.

=== Hughes ===
Hughes was promoted to CME from Works Manager on 10 February 1904. From 1905 in lots 51 and 64 he built 40 additional 2-4-2T locomotives with a Belpaire firebox replacing the original round-topped boiler. Predominately in the first half of the 1910s, this non-superheated boiler was also fitted to a number of rebuilt locomotives.

==== Class 6 ====
Bulleid in his book "The Aspinall Era" notes Horwich had fully mastered superheating by 1911. The final twenty examples of the 2-4-2T tanks built between 1911 and 1914 added superheating, long smokeboxes on Belpaire boilers, larger big-end bearings and an increased cylinder bore of 20 1/2 in (520 mm) to the modifications that had accrued since 1899. The resulting superheated locomotives had an increased tractive effort of 24,585 lbf (109.4 kN) and weighed 66 long tons 10 cwt (149,000 lb or 67.6 t).

Other superheated locomotives also arose from conversions. There were eventually 44 conversions, which were carried out between 1914 and 1931; 26 were of the Aspinall engines (which gained a Belpaire firebox at the same time), 18 of Hughes' own version with Belpaire firebox.

When Hughes introduced his classification system around 1919, the more powerful superheated locomotives were designated Class 6, non superheated locomotives being Class 5.

The locomotives passed to the London, Midland and Scottish Railway (LMS) in 1923. LMS numbers were 10900–10954, except for 9 which were converted after the grouping without being renumbered.

Summary of variants as built
Horwich Lots	Years	Quantity	Cylinder bore	Frames	Firebox	Superheated	CME
1, 4	1889–90	30	18 in	Short	Round-top	No (3 converted)	Aspinall
11, 12, 16, 22, 27, 28, 30, 34, 35	1892–93, 1895–98	180	17 1/2 in	Short	Round-top	No (6 converted)	Aspinall
36, 38, 41	1898–1901	60	17 1/2 in	Long	Round-top	No (17 converted)	Aspinall/Hoy
51, 64	1905, 1910	40	18 in	Long	Belpaire	No (18 converted)	Hughes
67	1911	20	20 1/2 in	Long	Belpaire	Yes	Hughes

Horwich Lot 1 comprised 10 locomotives; the rest 20 each.

=== Miscellaneous ===
The set of short-bunkered 2-4-2T frames were used to create a LY&R electric locomotive in 1912.

== Service ==
Bulleid claims the radial tanks were immediately successful, with No. 1008 going from the works and into service with no difficulty in February 1889. By the summer of 1891, they had gained a reputation for handling some of the more difficult L&YR routes including the 7 miles (11 km) adverse gradient of the Oldham Branch with 0.75 miles (1.21 km) at 1 in 52 then a further half mile at 1 in 44. Their duties also included the steepest passenger line in England, 1 in 27 for 0.5 miles (0.80 km) the Werneth spur.

In 1903, the incumbent CME Henry Hoy reported that the now 270 strong class had covered 61,000,000 mi (98,000,000 km) between them in the preceding 14 years across the L&YR system. They had suitable ability on passenger duties to haul a considerable load at any reasonable speed.

The last batch of 2-4-2 radial tanks entered service in 1911 and these more moreful superheated L&YR Class 6 were allocated to run some express passenger services to some extent as the unrebuilt Hughes 4-6-0 had multiple problems and the Aspinall Atlantics were beginning to exhibit high levels of unserviceability. However the L&YR were severely censured by the Boarad of Trade in the 1912 Charlestown curve derailment inquiry report for use of large radial tanks on high speed passenger services but despite protestations reputational damage seems to have resulted and the practice somewhat discontinued.

On 1 January 1922, the LY&R amalgamated with the London and North Western Railway (LWNR) and the fleet passed on into the London, Midland and Scottish Railway (LMS) with the initial grouping on 1 January 1923.

During the period under the LMS nearly two-thirds of the type were withdrawn and about 109 or 110 2Ps survived to pass to the nationalised British Railways on 1 January 1948. They were joined by 14 of the superheated Class 6 that were renumbered in the range 50835–50953. By 1961 only three remained in service.

=== Wirral Railway ===
The Wirral Railway (WR) acquired one of these locomotives from the L&YR in June 1921: No. 1041 became WR No. 6. After the Grouping of 1923, this re-joined its original stablemates as part of the newly created London, Midland and Scottish Railway. Although the L&YR locomotives were numbered in a block from No. 10621 upwards, which included the allocation of No. 10638 to the original L&YR number of the Wirral locomotive, the former Wirral locomotive stock was included in the LMS Western Division. The largest constituent of the Western Division was the LNWR, and so WR No. 6 was numbered 6762 by the LMS, at the end of a block starting at 6515 which was allocated to former LNWR 2-4-2T locomotives; this locomotive followed on from nos. 6758–61, four former LNWR 4ft 6in Tank Class which the WR had acquired from the LNWR.

No. 6762 survived into British Railways ownership (as 46762) and worked as station pilot at Preston, until being withdrawn and scrapped in 1952. It was the only Wirral Railway engine to last until Nationalisation; it also retained the original round-topped boiler throughout.

== Incidents ==
=== 1903 Waterloo, Lancashire derailment ===
On 15 July 1903, a Liverpool to Southport express with a six bogie carriage hauled by a 2-4-2T tank built in 1899 (Note: The build date of 1899 indicates this was a long frame locomotive) derailed on the approach to Waterloo (Merseyside) station resulting seven fatalities including the fireman and injury to 112 passengers, the driver, and three other companies staff. Major E. Druitt of the Board of Trade reporting on the accident indicated that while a speed of 50 miles per hour (80 km/h) on the preceding curve was excessive and should not exceed 35 miles per hour (56 km/h), the probable cause was the loss of a spring from the radial axle box.

=== 1906 boiler explosion ===
In 1906, Class 5 No. 869 suffered a boiler explosion at The Oaks station, north of Bolton. The firebox crown sheet broke free of its rod stays and burst downwards, although without splitting. 57 of the 150 one-inch (25-mm) rod stays failed, the steam escaping through the remaining holes scalding the driver, although both footplate crew survived their injuries. The cause of the accident, which was the L&YR's second major boiler explosion in five years, was put down to poor washing out of the firebox water spaces when at Colne shed. Afterwards, 72 pounds (33 kg) of boiler scale was collected. Although boilers were supposed to be washed out every eight days, this quantity suggests that it was up to three weeks since this had last been done thoroughly, either through omission or by inadequate washing.

=== 1912 Charlestown curve derailment ===
On 21 June 1912, the 2:25 pm Manchester to Leeds express hauled by superheated 2-4-2T suffered a serious derailment on Charlestown curve between Todmorden and Sowerby Bridge. In the Board of Trade report, Lieut–Col. E. Druitt criticised the L&YR for using tank locomotives on express trains.

=== 1916 viaduct collapse ===
On 2 February 1916, No. 661 was at Penistone in the process of running around its train ready for the return trip to Huddersfield, and was standing on Penistone Viaduct prior to setting back onto the train, when a pier and two arches of the viaduct gave way beneath the locomotive and collapsed into the River Don. The driver and fireman had time to run clear, but the locomotive fell 85 feet (26 m) into the valley below. Recovery intact was not possible, and the locomotive was scrapped on site over the following three weeks. The pieces were hauled up the embankment, loaded into wagons and sent back to Horwich, where some of the parts were incorporated into a replacement locomotive bearing the same number. No. 661 was one of those built with long frames, but the only available set of spare frames were of the short variety, so these were lengthened by welding on extension pieces at the rear.

== Preservation ==
No. 1008, the first Class 5 engine to be built, was withdrawn in 1954 after sixty-five years of service, and is now preserved as a static exhibit in the National Railway Museum. This locomotive is the small-bunkered version with the round-topped, boiler and is the only standard-gauge 2-4-2 tank engine preserved in Britain.

== Models and miniatures ==
The Wildlife Express Train, located at Disney's Animal Kingdom of the Walt Disney World in Orlando, Florida, uses three diesel–hydraulic locomotives based on the LY&R 2-4-2T on 3 ft (914 mm) narrow gauge track. They were built by Severn Lamb of Stratford-upon-Avon, United Kingdom, in 1997.

Bachmann introduced a ready to run OO gauge short frame round top boilered model of the LY&R 2-4-2T radial tank in the early 2010s. Before that there had only been a few kits available from various sources.
