= George Hughes (engineer) =

British railway and locomotive engineer

- Born: 9 October 1865; Benwick, Cambridgeshire, England
- Died: 27 October 1945 (aged 80); Stamford, Lincolnshire, England
- Occupation: Engineer
- Engineering career
- Discipline: Locomotive engineer

George Hughes (9 October 1865 – 27 October 1945) was an English locomotive engineer, and chief mechanical engineer (CME) of the Lancashire and Yorkshire Railway (L&YR) and the London, Midland and Scottish Railway (LMS).

== Biography ==
George Hughes was born on 9 October 1865 and served a premium apprenticeship at the London and North Western Railway (LNWR) Crewe Works between 1882 and 1886.

At the L&YR he started in the test room, and Bulleid notes the L&YR's John Aspinall was most pleased with his work there. He progressed through various positions at the L&YR culminating in achieving in becoming chief mechanical engineer in March 1904.

He introduced the L&YR locomotive classification system around 1919.

When the L&YR amalgamated into the LNWR in January 1922 he became the CME of the combined group and was appointed the CME of the LMS on its formation at the 1923 grouping.

He retired in July 1925 after only two and a half years at the LMS. He was succeeded by Henry Fowler who had worked with him at Horwich Works before moving to the former Midland Railway's Derby Works.

He died on 27 October 1945.

== Steam locomotives ==
=== L&YR ===
- Class 4, a superheated development of the Class 3, there were 2 versions each having different cylinder sizes and valve gear.
- Class 6, a superheated development of the Class 5
- Class 8 4-6-0 Dreadnought. As initially built these express passenger engines had significant issues, following rebuild their performance was "creditable".
- Class 28, a superheated development of the Class 27
- Railmotors
- 2-10-0, a heavy mineral loco design of 1914, not built owing to the outbreak of the Great War.

=== LMS ===
- LMS Hughes Crab, a 2-6-0 5P4F mixed-traffic locomotive had the basic design completed before Hughes' retirement. It was the last design from Horwich Works and Marshall gives it the accolade "The engine became at once, and remained, one of the best on the LMS". 245 were produced and Marshall comments the successful LMS Fowler 2-6-4T was also influenced by the design.
- 4-6-4T Dreadnought tank, Designed for L&YR, built by the LMS.

== Electric locomotives ==
During Hughes' time at the Lancashire and Yorkshire Railway built an electric goods locomotive in 1912 and a battery-electric shunter around 1917. The former had four 150 horsepower motors (total 600 hp) and could pick up current from the third rail on the main line or from overhead lines in freight yards.

== Publications ==
- Hughes, George (1894). The Construction of the Modern Locomotive. London, New York: E. F. Spon, Spon and Chamberlain. OCLC 608990983.

== See also ==
- Locomotives of the Lancashire and Yorkshire Railway
- LYR electric units

== Bibliography ==
- Whitehouse, Patrick; Thomas, David St John (1987). LMS 150. Newton Abbot: David & Charles.
- Bulleid, H.A.V. (1967). The Aspinall Era. Ian Allan Ltd.
- Marshall, John (1972). The Lancashire & Yorkshire Railway, volume 3. Newton Abbot: David & Charles. ISBN 0-7153-5320-9.

Business positions
Preceded by Henry Hoy	Chief mechanical engineer Lancashire and Yorkshire Railway; 1904 – 1922	Succeeded by Company absorbed by the London and North Western Railway
Preceded by H. P. M. Beames	Chief mechanical engineer London and North Western Railway; 1922 – 1923	Succeeded by Company absorbed by the London, Midland and Scottish Railway
Preceded by Company formed by the Railways Act 1921	Chief mechanical engineer London, Midland and Scottish Railway; 1923 – 1925	Succeeded by Henry Fowler
