= L&YR Class 8 =

British steam locomotive class (1908–1920)

Lancashire & Yorkshire Railway Class 8 (1908 specification)
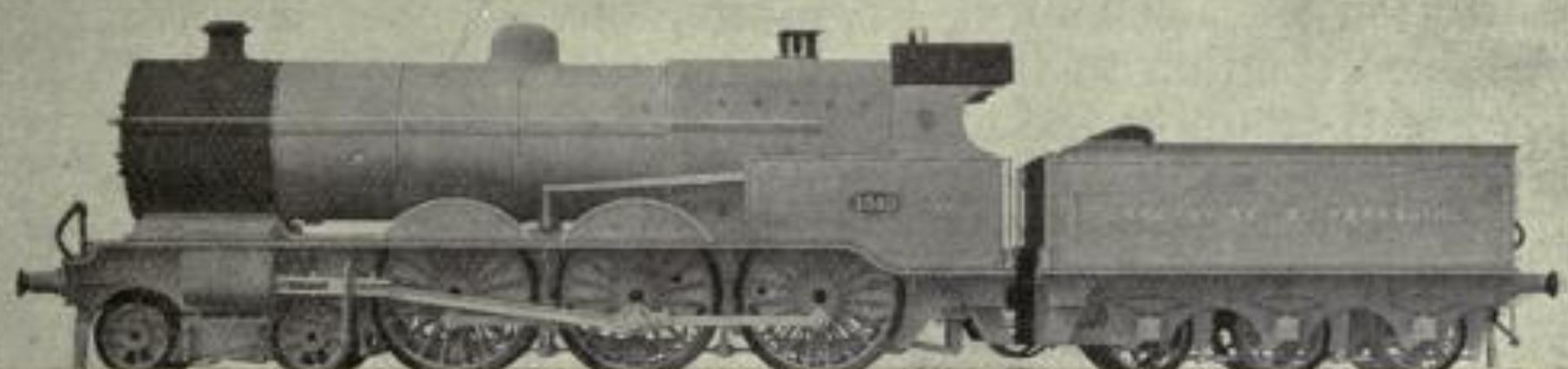
Type and origin
- Power type: Steam
- Designer: George Hughes
- Builder: Horwich Works
- Order number: Horwich Lot 60
- Serial number: Horwich 1009–1028
- Build date: June 1908 – March 1909
- Total produced: 20
Specifications
- Configuration
  - Whyte: 4-6-0
  - UIC: 2′C n4
- Gauge: 4 ft 8 1/2 in (1,435 mm)
- Leading dia.: 3 ft 0 1/2 in (0.927 m)
- Driver dia.: 6 ft 3 in (1.905 m)
- Wheelbase: Coupled: 13 ft 7 in (4.14 m); Loco: 25 ft 4 in (7.72 m)
- Loco weight: 77.05 long tons (78.29 t)
- Fuel type: Coal
- Boiler pressure: 180 lbf/in^{2} (1.24 MPa)
- Heating surface: 2,507 sq ft (232.9 m^{2})
- Superheater: (None)
- Cylinders: Four
- Cylinder size: 16 in × 26 in (406 mm × 660 mm)
- Valve gear: Joy
- Valve type: Slide valves
- Train brakes: Vacuum
Performance figures
- Tractive effort: 27,156 lbf (120.8 kN)
Career
- Operators: L&YR, LMS
- Class: L&YR: 8
- Power class: LMS: 3P
- Numbers: L&YR: 1506–1525; LMS:10400–10404
- Withdrawn: 1925–1926
- Disposition: 15 rebuilt 1919–1920, remainder scrapped

Lancashire & Yorkshire Railway Class 8 (1919 specification)
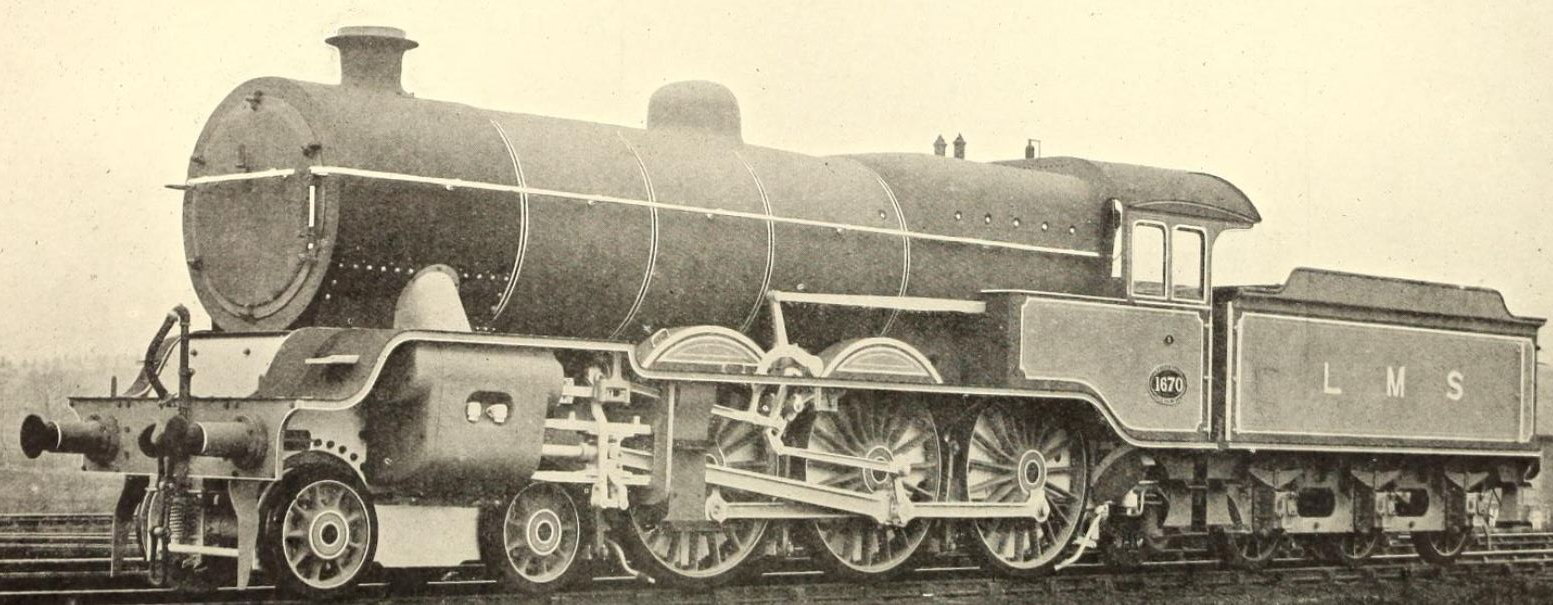
Type and origin
- Only items that differ are shown below
- Power type: Steam
- Builder: Horwich Works
- Order number: L&YR Lots 79, 80, 81, 83; LMS Lot No. 1
- Serial number: Horwich 1319–1353, 1364–1383
- Build date: 1919–1925
- Total produced: 15 rebuilt from first batch; 55 new
- Rebuilder: Horwich Works
Specifications
- Configuration
  - UIC: 2′C h4
- Wheelbase: Loco: 25 ft 7 in (7.80 m)
- Loco weight: 79.05 long tons (80.32 t)
- Heating surface: 1,686 sq ft (156.6 m^{2})
- Superheater
  - Type: 28-element Top & Bottom
  - Heating area: 552 sq ft (51.3 m^{2})
- Cylinders: Four
- Cylinder size: 16 1/2 in × 26 in (419 mm × 660 mm) or 15 3/4 in × 26 in (400 mm × 660 mm)
- Valve gear: Walschaerts
- Valve type: Piston valves
- Train brakes: Vacuum
Performance figures
- Tractive effort: 26,314 lbf (117.1 kN) (minimum) or 28,880 lbf (128.5 kN) (maximum)
- Factor of adh.: 4.60 (larger cylinders) or 5.05 (smaller cylinders)
Career
- Operators: Lancashire and Yorkshire Railway; → London, Midland and Scottish Railway; → British Railways
- Power class: LMS: 5P
- Numbers: L&YR: 1506-1525 (excl 1507/8, 1512/3, 1515), 1649–1683; LMS:10405–10474
- Withdrawn: 1934–1951
- Disposition: All scrapped

The Lancashire and Yorkshire Railway (L&YR) Class 8 was a four-cylinder 4-6-0 express passenger locomotive designed by George Hughes introduced in 1908.

== Design and construction ==
The increased weight of trains in the early 1900s and need for improved power on Liverpool—Manchester—Hull expresses and Leeds—Fleetwood boat trains indicated a need for an engine more powerful than the Aspinall's 4-4-2 Atlantic of 1899. Hughes described the requirement in a paper read to the Institute of Mechanical Engineers thus:

This design was brought about by the further increased weight of trains and the necessity of accurate time-keeping with the accelerated train schedule of the Liverpool, Manchester, and Hull expresses, the Leeds, Bradford and Fleetwood boat trains, and to cope with the gradients on the Bradford, Huddersfield, and Sheffield sections

— George Hughes

Hughes created a design with a boiler producing saturated steam, slide valves and Joy valve gear.

The first examples came out of Horwich Works in June 1908, and the original batch of 20 was completed in by March 1909. Around the time of their construction, they were nicknamed "Dreadnoughts" on account of their large size, after the then-new Royal Navy battleship HMS Dreadnought.

The locomotives proved "sluggish, poor runners and poor steamers". They were subject to a number of modifications to improve steaming, including enlarged blast pipes and an air duct running to the front and rear of the ashpan in order to improve combustion.

The high maintenance demands of the class saw a queue needing attention building up at Horwich Works during World War I. Remedial modifications were restricted but five were fitted with replacement modified boilers to keep them in service.

=== 1920 rebuilding ===
From 1920 to 1921, fifteen were rebuilt with superheaters, piston valves, Walschaerts valve gear, a larger cab, and slightly larger cylinders. The nominal tractive effort of the rebuilds was 28,880 lbf (128.46 kN) which made these engines for a time the second most powerful in Great Britain (to the Somerset and Dorset 2-8-0s dating from 1914) until 1922 when the Gresley Pacifics appeared. The rebuilt locomotives were reported to be "a good workman-like engine" and "an engine thoroughly master of its work", although still with a coal consumption on the heavy side.

=== Later batches ===
Improved performance of the rebuilt locomotives and favourable test comparisons with the LNWR Prince of Wales Class and LNWR Claughton Class in 1921 and published in The Engineer were a trigger for the L&YR to order more of the type.

Deliveries of the ten locomotives in Lot 80 commenced in August 1921 with the last two being delivered after the amalgamation of the L&YR into the London and North Western Railway (LNWR) in 1922. Deliveries from the 25 locomotives Lot 81 commenced in November 1922 with only four built before grouping and creation of the London, Midland and Scottish Railway and the remainder delivered in 1923. The 20 more of Lot 83 were originally part of the 30-locomotive order for the related L&YR Hughes 4-6-4T and were delivered during 1924 apart from the final locomotive No. 10474 on 5 January 1925.

=== Compound conversion trial ===
No. 10456 was converted to a 4-cylinder compound in July 1926; it was fitted with 16-inch (406 mm) high pressure and 22-inch (559 mm) low pressure cylinders.

=== Build details ===
Table of orders and locomotives
Lot No.	Qty	Manufacturer	Serial Nos.	Year	L&Y Nos.	LMS Nos.	Notes
60	20	Horwich Works	1009–1028	June 1908 to March 1909	1506–1525	10400–10419	Numbers 10400-10404 not applied
79	(15)	Horwich Works	—	Rebuilt from November 1920 to July 1921	1522/14/23/10/11; 1506/21/16/25/09; 1520/17/24/19/18	10405–10419	rebuilds of Lot 60
80	10	Horwich Works	1319–1328	August to October 1921, March 1922, May 1922	1649–1658	10420–10429	
81	25	Horwich Works	1329–1353	November 1922 to September 1923	1659–1678 (1679–1683)	10430–10454	
83	20	Horwich Works	1364–1383	April 1924 to January 1925	(1694–1713)	10455–10474	

== Service ==
The original unrebuilt locomotives were described as "poor performers" that were prone to mechanical problems and very poor reliability. By 1918 there was a case of No. 1519, one of the worse performers, having a coal consumption of 100 lb/mi (28.2 kg/km) between Southport and York. During the National coal strike of 1912 the unrebuilt Hughes 4-6-0 class were suspended because while able to "shift anything" their fuel economy was too poor in a time of shortage. The rebuilt locomotives were described as "creditable but not outstanding" and comparable to the LNWR Claughton Class.

As well as former L&YR territory the rebuilt class worked the West Coast Main Line mainly between Crewe and Carlisle but less frequently south to Euston as the LMS Royal Scot Class became available. The last train was an enthusiast excursion from Blackpool to York by what was described as an "old" locomotive on 1 July 1951.

== Withdrawal ==
The relatively early withdrawal of most units was due the LMS inheriting 393 different locomotive classes at Grouping, with LMS chairman Sir Josiah Stamp seeing it desirable to reduce this to just 10 classes. Also while Hughes became chief mechanical engineer (CME) of the LNWR following amalgamation with the L&YR and then CME of the LMS, with his resignation in 1925 influence moved from Horwich to Derby. In a paper presented to the Institute of Locomotive Engineers in 1946 E. S. Cox claimed that while the class were capable of some outstanding performances their "steaming, coal consumption and reliability were not outstanding" and were considered unsuitable for general use on the Anglo Scottish routes.

Table of withdrawals
Year	Quantity in service at start of year	Quantity withdrawn	Locomotive numbers	Notes
1925	75	3	1507/13/15	
1926	72	3	1508/12, 10417	
1933	69	1	10414	
1934	68	13	10405/10/13/19/21/24/26–27/31/34/41/47/53	
1935	55	17	10407–08/11/28/30/33/39–40/58/61–63/66/69–70/72/74	
1936	38	20	10409/15–16/18/25/35–36/38/43/45/49–52/54/56–57/59/68/71	
1937	18	7	10406/20/22/44/65/67/73	
1939	11	1	10464	
1946	10	2	10437/46	
1947	8	1	10460	
1948	7	1	10423	
1949	6	4	10412/29/32/48	
1950	2	1	10442	
1951	1	1	50455	Only locomotive to have BR livery and number applied.
