= L&YR Hughes 4-6-4T =

British steam locomotive class (1924–1942)

Lancashire & Yorkshire Railway Hughes 4-6-4T
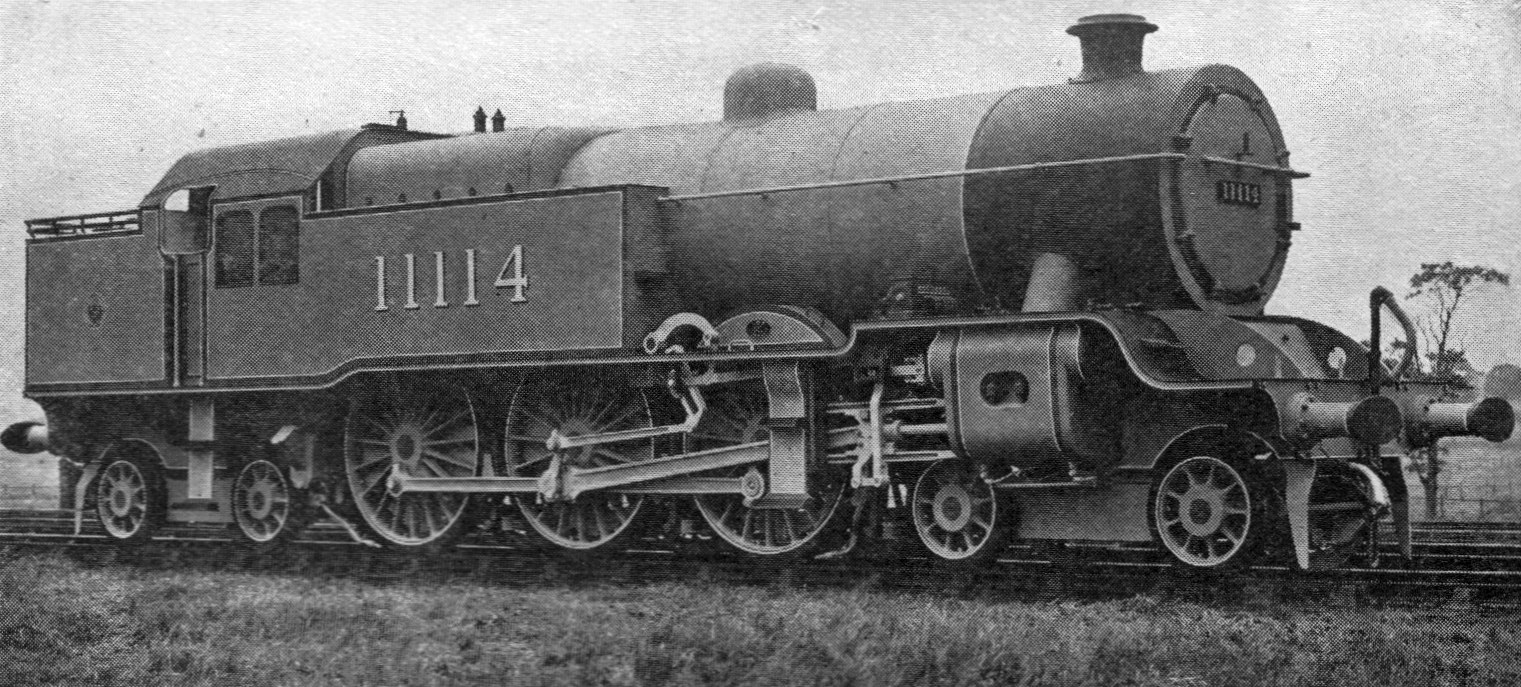
- 11114 in photographic grey
Type and origin
- Power type: Steam
- Designer: George Hughes
- Builder: LMS Horwich Works
- Order number: Horwich Lot 82; LMS Lot No. 2
- Serial number: Horwich 1354–1363
- Build date: March – August 1924
- Total produced: 10
Specifications
- Configuration
  - Whyte: 4-6-4T
  - UIC: 2′C2′ h4t
- Gauge: 4 ft 8 1/2 in (1,435 mm)
- Leading dia.: 3 ft 0 3/8 in (0.924 m)
- Driver dia.: 6 ft 3 in (1.905 m)
- Trailing dia.: 3 ft 0 3/8 in (0.924 m)
- Length: 49 ft 10 1/2 in (15.20 m)
- Loco weight: 99.95 long tons (101.55 t; 111.94 short tons)
- Fuel type: Coal
- Fuel capacity: 3.50 long tons (3.56 t)
- Water cap.: 2,000 imp gal (9,100 L; 2,400 US gal)
- Firebox
  - Grate area: 29.5 sq ft (2.74 m^{2})
- Boiler: LMS type ‘RS’
- Boiler pressure: 180 lbf/in^{2} (1.24 MPa)
- Heating surface
  - Tubes and flues: 1,817 sq ft (168.8 m^{2})
- Superheater
  - Heating area: 395–430 sq ft (36.7–39.9 m^{2})
- Cylinders: Four
- Cylinder size: 16 1/2 in × 26 in (419 mm × 660 mm)
- Valve gear: Walschaerts
- Valve type: Piston valves
- Train brakes: Vacuum
Performance figures
- Tractive effort: 28,880 lbf (128.5 kN)
Career
- Operators: London, Midland and Scottish Railway
- Power class: 5P
- Numbers: 11110–11119
- Nicknames: Dreadnought tank
- Withdrawn: March 1938 – January 1942
- Disposition: All scrapped

The Lancashire and Yorkshire Railway Hughes 4-6-4T was a class of steam locomotives. They were a 4-6-4T tank engine version of the L&YR Class 8 ("Dreadnought" Class 4-6-0), hence they were known as "Dreadnought tanks".

== Construction ==
All were actually built by the London, Midland and Scottish Railway in 1924 after the grouping, albeit at the Lancashire and Yorkshire Railway's Horwich Works.

== Numbering ==
They had been allocated L&YR numbers 1684–1693, but these were never carried and there was no L&YR class number. The LMS gave them the numbers 11110–11119, and the power classification 5P.

== Orders modified or cancelled ==
Another 20 of this class were ordered but turned out as further examples of the L&YR Class 8. Orders for an additional 30 were cancelled. Like the Class 8 on which they were based, they were not particularly successful.

== Withdrawal ==
Withdrawals started in 1938, with three engines (11112, 11115, 11116), one each in 1939 and 1940 (11113 and 11111 respectively), four in 1941 (11114, 11117–11119) and the last (11110) in January 1942. No examples were preserved.
