= LMS Ivatt Class 4 =

British steam locomotive class (1947–1968)

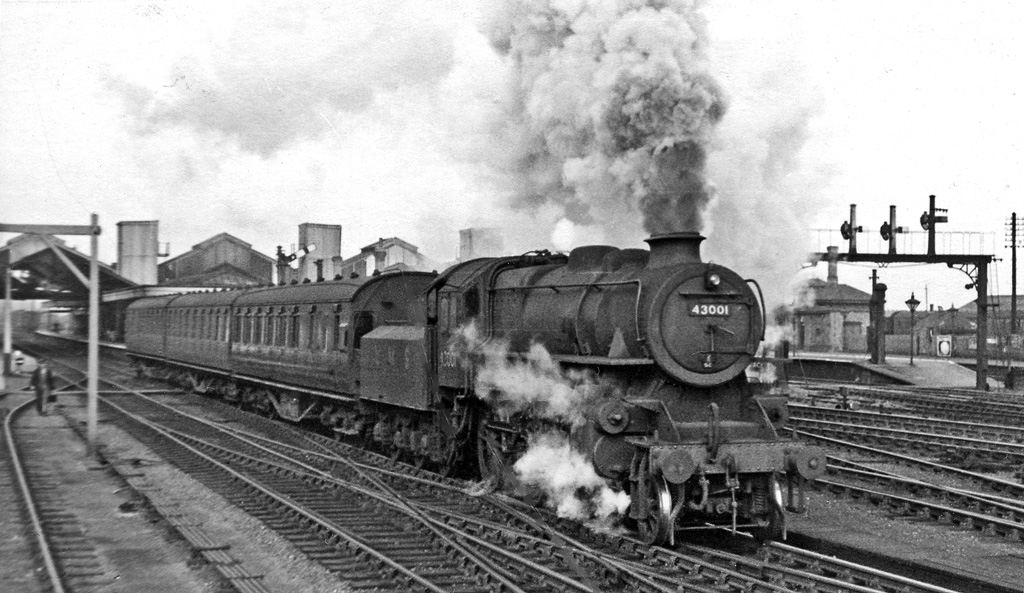
- 43001 at Bletchley Station
Type and origin
- Power type: Steam
- Designer: H.G. Ivatt
- Builder: LMS/BR Horwich Works (75); BR Doncaster Works (50); BR Darlington Works (37)
- Build date: 1947-1952
- Total produced: 162
Specifications
- Configuration
  - Whyte: 2-6-0
  - UIC: 1′C h2
- Gauge: 4 ft 8 1/2 in (1,435 mm) standard gauge
- Leading dia.: 3 ft 0 in (0.914 m)
- Driver dia.: 5 ft 3 in (1.600 m)
- Length: 55 ft 11 in (17.04 m)
- Loco weight: 59.1 long tons (60.0 t; 66.2 short tons)
- Tender weight: 40.3 long tons (40.9 t; 45.1 short tons)
- Fuel type: Coal
- Fuel capacity: 4 long tons (4.1 t; 4.5 short tons)
- Water cap.: 3,500 imp gal (16,000 L; 4,200 US gal)
- Firebox
  - Grate area: 23 sq ft (2.1 m^{2})
- Boiler: LMS 4D
- Boiler pressure: 225 lbf/in^{2} (1.55 MPa)
- Heating surface
  - Firebox: 131 sq ft (12.2 m^{2})
  - Tubes and flues: 1,090 sq ft (101 m^{2})
- Superheater
  - Heating area: 231 or 247 sq ft (21.5 or 22.9 m^{2})
- Cylinders: Two, outside
- Cylinder size: 17 1/2 in × 26 in (444 mm × 660 mm)
- Valve gear: Walschaerts
Performance figures
- Tractive effort: 24,170 lbf (107.51 kN)
Career
- Operators: London, Midland and Scottish Railway; British Railways
- Power class: LMS: 4F, later 4; BR: 4MT
- Numbers: LMS: 3000–3009; BR: 43000–43161
- Nicknames: Mucky Ducks, Doodlebugs, Flying Pigs
- Axle load class: BR: Route Availability 4
- Withdrawn: 1963–68
- Disposition: One preserved, remainder scrapped

The LMS Ivatt Class 4 2-6-0 is a class of steam locomotive primarily designed for medium freight work but also widely used on secondary passenger services. The London, Midland and Scottish Railway (LMS) ordered 162 of this type between 1947 and 1952, but only three were built by the LMS before nationalisation in 1948. Designed by George Ivatt, they were classified 4F by the LMS and 4MT by British Railways (BR).

In BR days they were used extensively across the system, being prevalent on the London Midland region and to a lesser extent elsewhere, notably on the Midland and Great Northern Joint Railway, an East Anglian line that had previously been joint owned by the LMS and LNER, where they became the dominant locomotive type. They were also used for a short period on the Somerset and Dorset Joint Railway, but were quickly transferred elsewhere, never to return, because of poor steaming on the line's long and steep gradients – this was before modifications were made to the design which improved steaming notably.

== Numbering ==
The first three engines were numbered 3000–3002 by the LMS, but became 43000–43002 when renumbered by BR – 40000 was added to the running number to indicate an ex-LMS locomotive. The remaining 159, built by BR, continued the number sequence: 43003–43161. Construction was divided between different locations, 75 were completed at Horwich Works, 50 at Doncaster Works and 37 at Darlington Works. The class was also sometimes called mucky ducks or doodlebugs or even flying pigs.

Fifty were ordered by the LMS between 1945 and 1947 to be built at Horwich Works, of which only three had been delivered before nationalisation – the remainder were delivered to British Railways (BR). All fifty were allocated to former LMS depots in England. From 1948 onward, BR authorised the construction of a further 112. Most of these BR-ordered locomotives were allocated to former LNER depots on the Eastern, North Eastern or Scottish Regions; only ten (nos. 43112–21) were sent to former LMS depots.

Construction
| Building programme | Approved | Quantity | Numbers | Lot | Works | Works nos | Built |
|---|---|---|---|---|---|---|---|
| LMS 1947 | 19 Dec 1945 | 10 | 3000–9 | LMS 188 | Horwich (lot 100) | | 1947–48 |
| LMS 1947 | 19 Dec 1945 | 10 | 3010–9 | LMS 188 | Horwich (lot 101) | | 1948 |
| LMS 1948 | 23 Oct 1946 | 20 | 3020–39 | LMS 193 | Horwich (lot 103) | | 1948–49 |
| LMS 1949 | 29 Oct 1947 | 10 | 3040–9 | LMS 200 | Horwich (lot 104) | | 1949 |
| BR 1950 | | 10 | 43050–9 | ER/NER 1276 | Doncaster (E.O. 389) | 2057–66 | 1950 |
| BR 1950 | | 10 | 43060–9 | ER/NER 1276 | Doncaster (E.O. 390) | 2067–76 | 1950 |
| BR 1950 | | 37 | 43070–106 | ER/NER 1278 | Darlington | 2112–48 | 1950–51 |
| BR 1950 | | 5 | 43107–11 | ER/NER 1352 | Doncaster | 2077–81 | 1951 |
| BR 1951 | | 25 | 43112–36 | LMR 223 | Horwich (lot 106) | | 1951–52 |
| BR 1951 | | 25 | 43137–61 | ER/NER 1308 | Doncaster | 2082–2106 | 1951–52 |

The fifty built at Doncaster were built against Engine Orders (E.O.) 389–394. E.O. 389, 390 and 392 were each for ten and E.O. 394 for five; the others comprised one each for ten and five locomotives.

== Design ==
The design was noted for its American looks – the running-plates were positioned at a high level and a gap left ahead of the cylinders. Because of this, many locomotive enthusiasts considered it to be the ugliest British locomotive produced, especially the first 50 locomotives, which were outshopped with double chimneys; however, these gave poor performance and were quickly replaced with single chimneys. The locomotives also incorporated new mechanical features intended to reduce maintenance costs. The utilitarian appearance was a deliberate design decision as there are sketches which show the locomotive with conventional curved running plates.

The BR Standard Class 4 2-6-0 was based on this design. Its looks were improved somewhat by the re-design of the outside foot-plating, to include a sloping plate to fill the gap ahead of the cylinders.

== Accidents and incidents ==
- On 8 August 1952, locomotive No. 43142 rolled off a turntable in South Lynn and fell into a muddy ditch. The incident became the inspiration for Gordon's accident in The Railway Series story Off The Rails, as well as the televised series' episode of the same name.
- On 15 November 1964, locomotive No. 43072 was hauling a freight train which ran away and crashed at Adolphus Street Goods Yard, Bradford, Yorkshire. The locomotive was subsequently scrapped in situ.

== Withdrawal ==
The class were withdrawn between 1963 and 1968.

Table of withdrawals
| Year | Quantity in service at start of year | Quantity withdrawn | Locomotive numbers |
|---|---|---|---|
| 1963 | 162 | 6 | 43083, 43107/10/14/31/42. |
| 1964 | 156 | 15 | 43038/53/58/60–61/68/72/86–87/94, 43104/36/47/52/54. |
| 1965 | 141 | 42 | 43005/13/25/32/35/37/59/62/64–65/67/75/80–82/85/89–93, 43108–09/11/27–28/34/43–46/48–50/53/55–61. |
| 1966 | 99 | 34 | 43009/14/16/18/20/22/26/30–31/36/39–40/42/45/52/54/56–57/69/74/78–79/95/99, 43102–03/13/16/24/26/32–33/35/41. |
| 1967 | 65 | 59 | 43000–04/07/10–12/15/17/21/23–24/28–29/34/41/43–44/46–51/55/63/66/70–71/73/76–77/84/88/96–98, 43100–01/05/12/15/17–23/25/29–30/37–40/51. |
| 1968 | 6 | 6 | 43006/08/19/27/33, 43106. |

== Preservation ==
Only one example survived into preservation: No. 43106, the final member of the class in service, which was based at Lostock Hall depot. Its last operational turn was just before Easter in 1968, but its last turn was interrupted by a derailment in Colne Goods Yard. Since 43106 had already been selected as the best of the remaining small group, a 'search party' was despatched on Easter Tuesday to survey the damage. It was felt that damage was so minimal the prospective owners would investigate the ease of a repair. On its return to Lostock Hall, the locomotive was repaired by fitters from Carnforth, that repair exists to this day. However, it derailed again at Lostock Hall when being prepared for a test run in late July.

It was steamed for the final time by British Rail on 1 August 1968 and departed at about 15:30 with one member of its new owning consortium on board. This was only after lengthy discussions to get the locomotive moved in live steam before 4 August, the end of steam operation on British Rail. The journey was carefully routed to limit movement under the wires, via Frodsham, Chester and Shrewsbury. The journey through the West Midlands continued via Wolverhampton High Level towards Bescot and Pleck Junction, where after a movement around a triangular junction to ensure it arrived the right way round, the light engine continued on to Stourbridge Junction where it was stabled overnight in the exchange sidings, now part of the extensive car park. On 2 August, it continued on to its new life in preservation on the Severn Valley Railway appearing on the front page of the Shropshire Journal with three of its new owners giving it a much needed clean. It is affectionately known as the Flying Pig, although many railwaymen referred to the Ivatt Class 4s as Doodlebugs.

Between 1975 and 1983, No. 43106 saw use on the mainline hauling railtours. In 1975, it attended the Rail 150 celebrations in Shildon and in 1980 it took part in the Rocket 150 celebrations at Rainhill. On a small number of occasions between 1980 and 1983, the engine saw use on a limited number of railtours, on some occasions double heading with fellow SVR based engines including: 5000, 7812 Erlestoke Manor and 80079.

A major overhaul of the locomotive was completed in 2009, but shortly afterwards suffered a derailment at Hampton Loade and required repairs. It received further repairs to the boiler in 2013, which included a renewed boiler ticket. This expired in January 2024 with a final appearance before withdrawal at the SVR's Winter Gala. In December 2025 it was moved to Kidderminster for under cover storage.

== Gallery ==
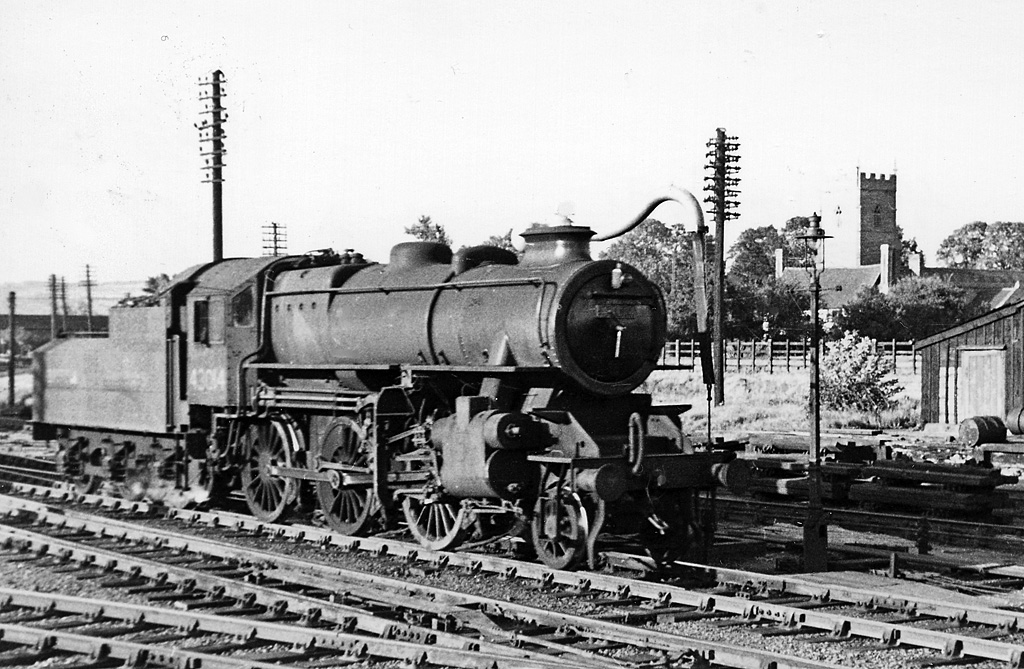
No. 43014 stood at Ashchurch, July 1949

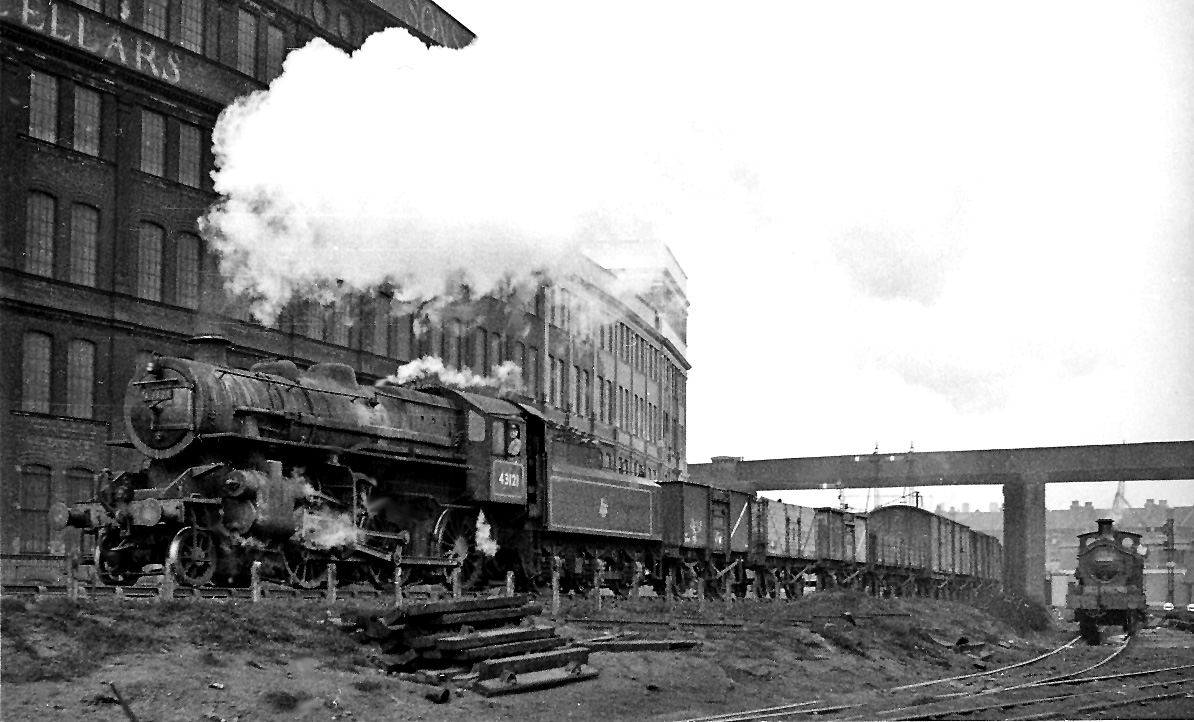
No. 43121 passing Clapham Stewarts Lane, February 1958

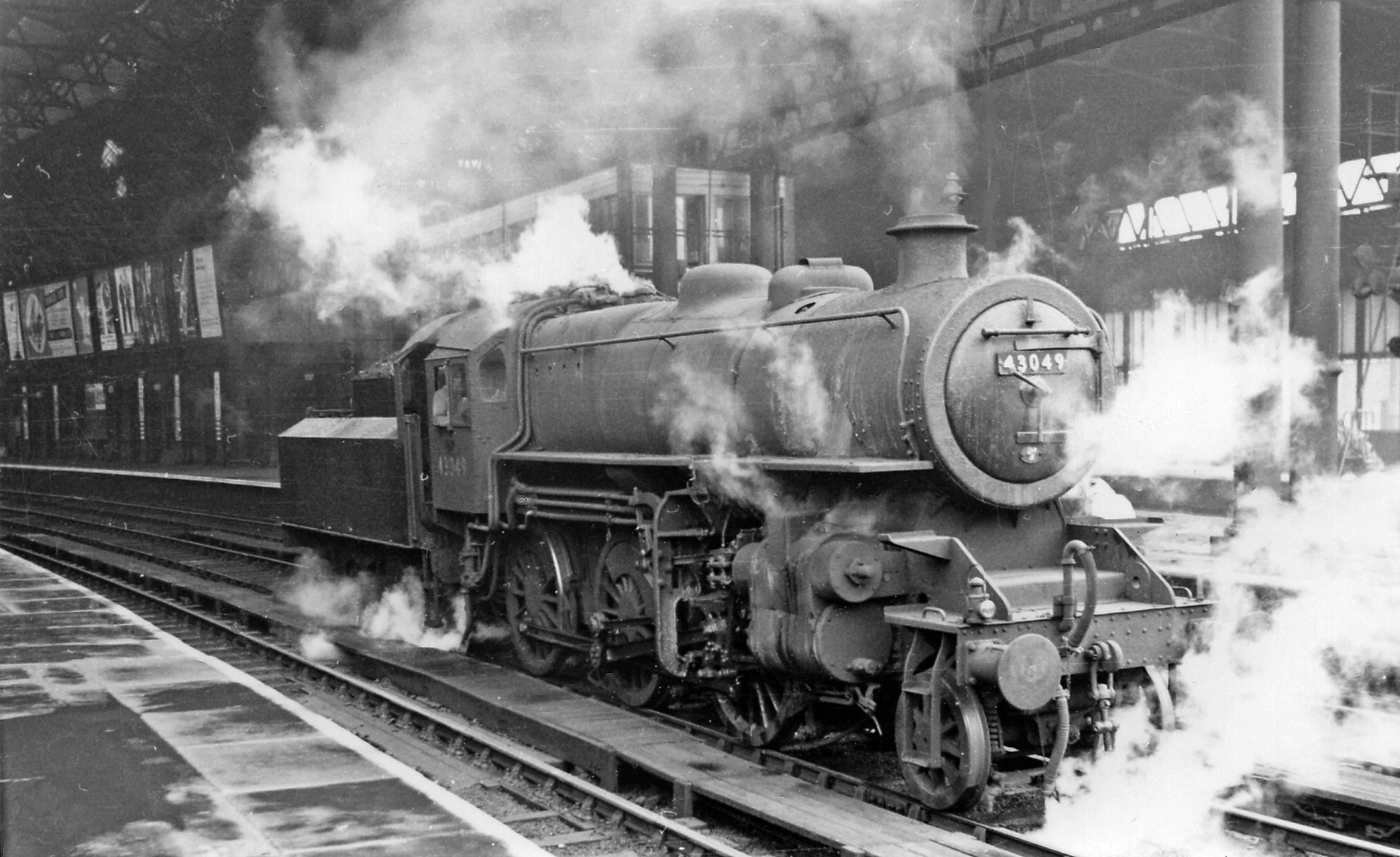
No. 43049 at Birmingham New Street, October 1959

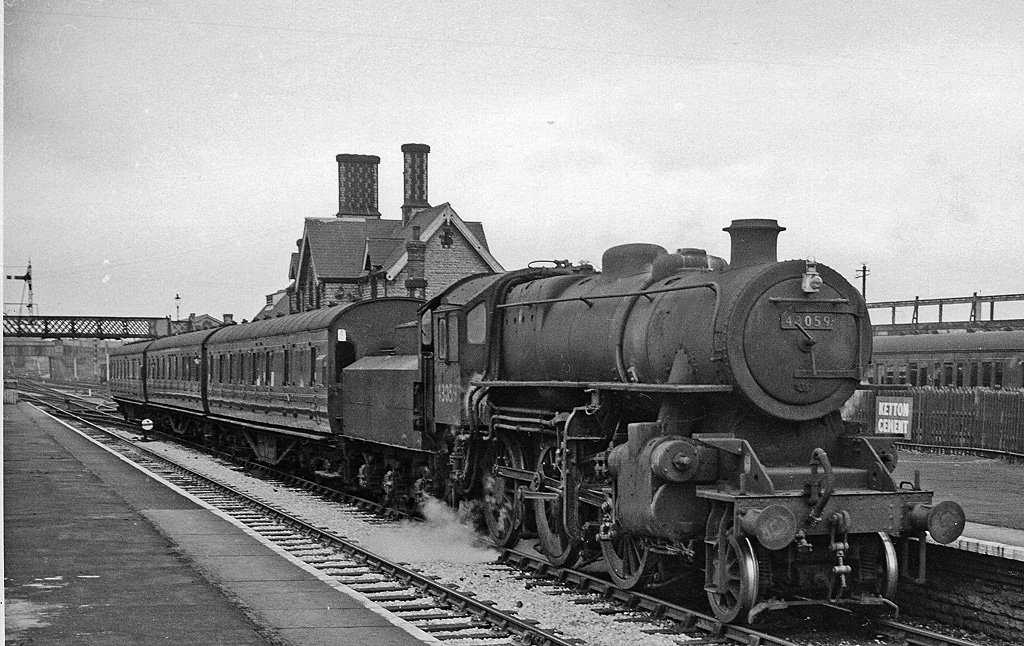
No. 43059 at Basford North on a passenger service, August 1963

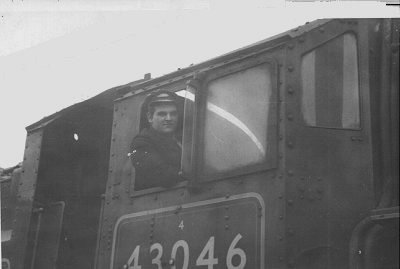
Close-up of the cab of 43046. Note the power classification of 4 on the cab side.

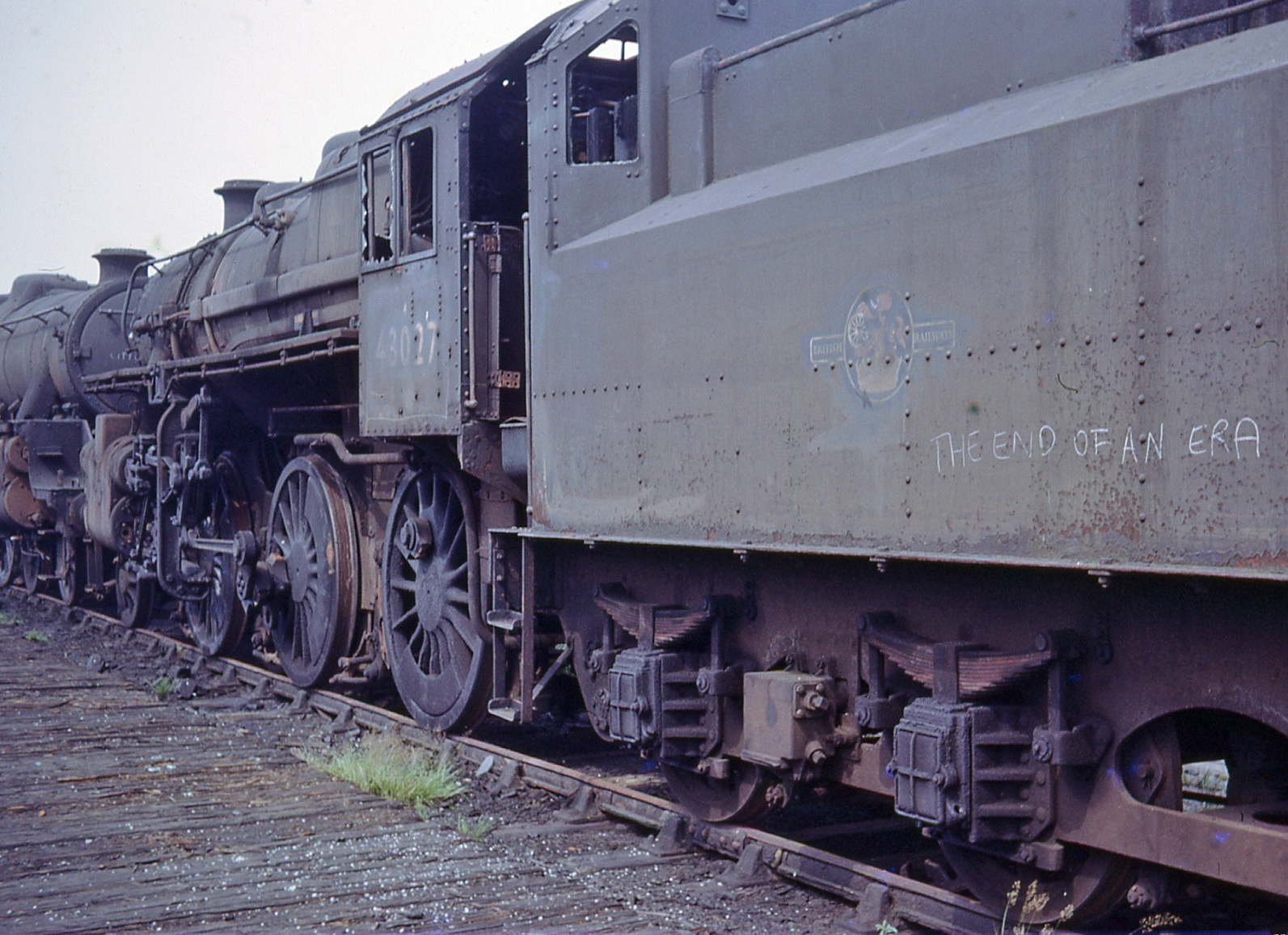
Ivatt 4MT 2-6-0 43027 dumped at Lostock Hall shed, July 1968

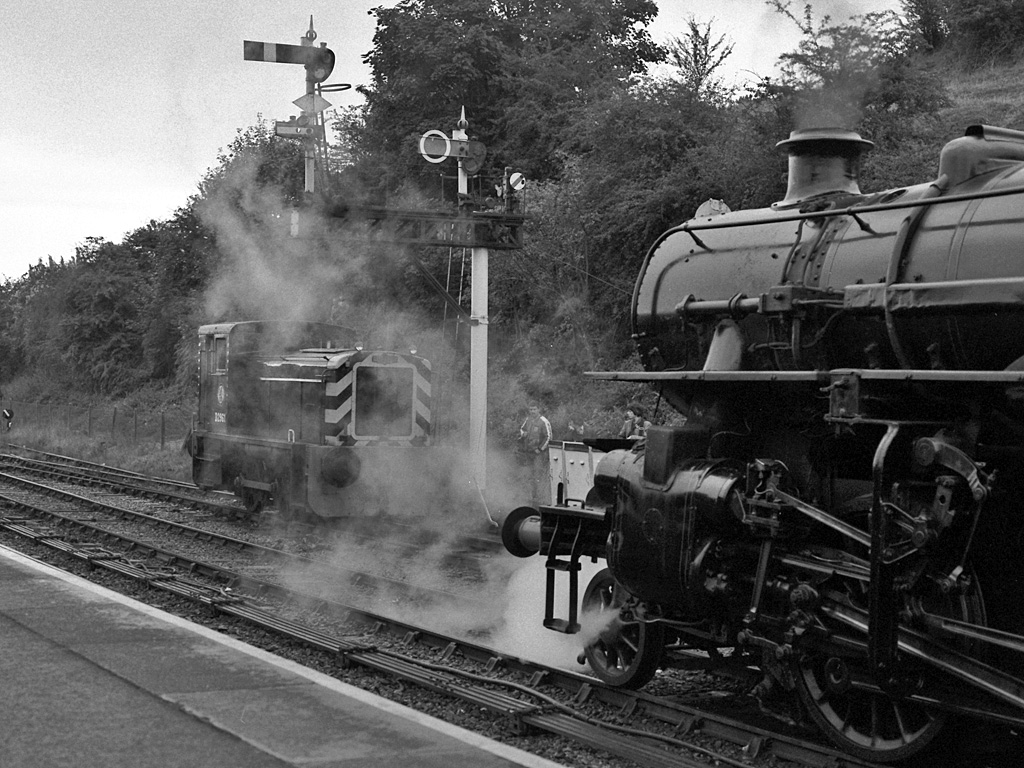
43106 of Saltley MPD stands on platform 2 at Bridgnorth station on the Severn Valley Railway

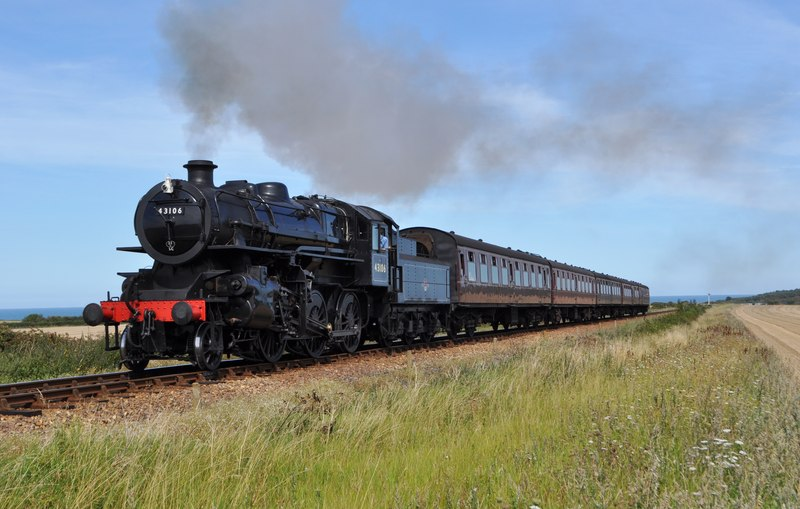
On the North Norfolk Railway in 2011
