= LMS Hughes Crab =

British steam locomotive, built 1926–1932

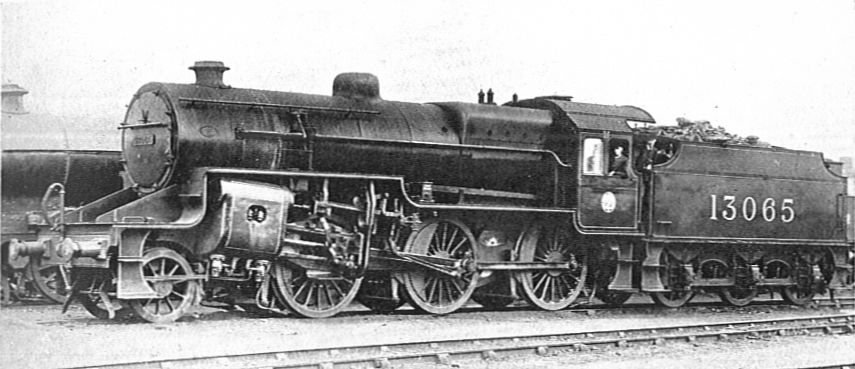
Type and origin
- Power type: Steam
- Designer: George Hughes
- Builder: LMS Horwich Works (70), Crewe Works (175)
- Build date: 1926–1932
- Total produced: 245
Specifications
- Configuration
  - Whyte: 2-6-0
  - UIC: 1′C h2
- Gauge: 4 ft 8 1/2 in (1,435 mm) standard gauge
- Leading dia.: 3 ft 6 1/2 in (1.080 m)
- Driver dia.: 5 ft 6 in (1.676 m)
- Length: 59 ft 3 7/8 in (18.082 m)
- Loco weight: 66 long tons (67 t; 74 short tons)
- Fuel type: Coal
- Fuel capacity: 5 long tons (5.1 t; 5.6 short tons)
- Water cap.: 3,500 imp gal (16,000 L; 4,200 US gal)
- Firebox
  - Grate area: 27.5 sq ft (2.55 m^{2})
- Boiler: LMS type G9HS
- Boiler pressure: 180 lbf/in^{2} (1.24 MPa)
- Heating surface
  - Firebox: 160 sq ft (15 m^{2})
  - Tubes: 1,361 sq ft (126.4 m^{2}), later 1,345 sq ft (125.0 m^{2})
- Superheater
  - Heating area: 307 sq ft (28.5 m^{2})
- Cylinders: Two, outside
- Cylinder size: 21 in × 26 in (533 mm × 660 mm)
Performance figures
- Tractive effort: 26,580 lbf (118.23 kN)
Career
- Operators: London, Midland and Scottish Railway; British Railways
- Power class: LMS: 4 later 5P4F, later 5P5F, (Note: The reclassification from 4F to 5F took effect on 24 March 1940, but may be shown in records as being slightly later.) 6P5F, later 5MT
- Numbers: LMS 13000–13244, renumbered 2700–2944 in 1934, BR 42700–42944
- Nicknames: Crab
- Withdrawn: 1961–1967
- Disposition: 2 preserved, 1 extant, remainder scrapped

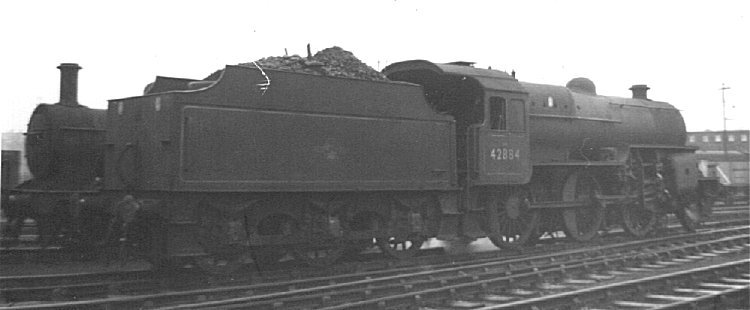
42884 at Carlisle in 1960. Note the Fowler tender which is narrower than the locomotive.

The London, Midland and Scottish Railway (LMS) Hughes Crab or Horwich Mogul is a class of mixed-traffic 2-6-0 steam locomotive built between 1926 and 1932. They are noted for their appearance with large steeply-angled cylinders to accommodate a restricted loading gauge.

== Overview ==
Designed by George Hughes, chief mechanical engineer of the LMS, and built at the ex-L&YR works at Horwich and the ex-LNWR works at Crewe. The inspiration came from a Caledonian Railway 2-6-0 design at the grouping, however the cylinders were too large for the LMS English section's loading gauge, resulting in Hughes having to adapt the concept. They were put into service by his successor, Henry Fowler. The design incorporated a number of advanced features for the time such as long travel valves, compensated brake gear, a new design of tender and a new boiler, the latter based on the one fitted to Hughes's four-cylinder Baltic tank locomotives built at Horwich.

Fowler tried to have the design altered to use standard Derby components. However the design process and pre-production were sufficiently advanced to prevent the fitting of a smaller Derby pattern boiler, and the cylinders and motion also remained as designed by Hughes. The tender was replaced by a Derby standard type, which was narrower than the cab. Standard Midland Railway boiler fittings and brake equipment were also substituted, and the class became something of a hybrid design. Nevertheless they performed rather well in most circumstances and gained a strong reputation in some areas, especially in Scotland, where they became the preferred locomotive for heavy unfitted mineral work on difficult routes, even after the introduction of the Stanier mixed traffic 4-6-0s.

=== Experiments ===
In 1931, five engines, 13118, 13122, 13124, 13125 and 13129 were fitted with Lentz valve gear. They were renumbered as 42818, 42822, 42824, 42825 and 42829 after nationalisation. In 1953, the Lentz valve gear on these engines was replaced with Reidinger valve gear.

Tests at Rugby Locomotive Testing Station in 1954 indicated the design had a maximum steaming rate of 16,000 pounds per hour (7,300 kg/h). Modifications of the chimney and blast pipe improved the maximum rate to 20,000 pounds per hour (9,100 kg/h) but no other engine was modified to take advantage of this.

=== Successor ===
When an order was placed by the traffic department for delivery of 40 more examples of this type, the new chief mechanical engineer, William Stanier, decided to introduce a taper boiler version, in line with his policy of using taper boilers on all new locomotive designs. There were so many changes to the layout of the locomotive, such as higher boiler pressure and smaller cylinders, that it became a new design, the LMS Stanier Mogul.

== Numbering ==
| Numbers | | | Lot No. | Date | Built at |
| Original | LMS 1933 | BR | Lot No. | Date | Built at |
|---|---|---|---|---|---|
| 13000–06 | 2700–06 | 42700–06 | 20 | 1926 | Horwich |
| 13007–29 | 2707–29 | 42707–29 | 20 | 1927 | Horwich |
| 13030–35 | 2730–35 | 42730–35 | 21 | 1926 | Crewe |
| 13036–99 | 2736–99 | 42736–99 | 21 | 1927 | Crewe |
| 13100–07 | 2800–07 | 42800–07 | 54 | 1928 | Crewe |
| 13108–09 | 2808–09 | 42808–09 | 54 | 1929 | Crewe |
| 13110–29 | 2810–29 | 42810–29 | 63 | 1929 | Horwich |
| 13130–49 | 2830–49 | 42830–49 | 68 | 1930 | Horwich |
| 13150–224 | 2850–924 | 42850–924 | 69 | 1930 | Crewe |
| 13225–34 | 2925–34 | 42925–34 | 80 | 1931 | Crewe |
| 13235–44 | 2935–44 | 42935–44 | 86 | 1932 | Crewe |

Initially numbered 13000–244, as standard locomotives they were given the lower numbers 2700–2944 in the LMS 1933 renumbering scheme. After being taken into British Railways stock an additional 40000 was added to their numbers, becoming 42700–42944.

== Withdrawal ==
The class survived intact until 1961 when three were withdrawn. The remainder of the class were withdrawn over the next six years.

Table of withdrawals
| Year | Quantity in service at start of year | Quantity withdrawn | Locomotive numbers |
|---|---|---|---|
| 1961 | 245 | 3 | 42864/93, 42930. |
| 1962 | 242 | 61 | 42713–14/20/24/26/42–45/49/52/64/66/73/75/79/81/84/86/97, 42804/07–09/11/18/22/24–25/29–30/33–37/47/50/57/62/66/68/74–77/81–84/87/89/91/99, 42903/06/15/18/27/29/39. |
| 1963 | 181 | 52 | 42704/06/11/18/21/23/28–29/35/46–47/50/58–59/62/67–68/70–71/74/85/90/92/94/96/98, 42805–06/10/13/21/38/43/52–54/65/70–73/85/90/95, 42910–11/14/21/28/33/35/44. |
| 1964 | 129 | 54 | 42701/03/05/07–09/17/19/25/31/38/48/54–57/60–61/63/69/76/88/93, 42802/15–16/20/23/26/39–40/42/45–46/51/55–56/58/60/67/80/88/94/97, 42902/07/20/22–23/25–26/31/34/43. |
| 1965 | 75 | 48 | 42710/16/22/30/32–33/41/51/53/72/77–78/80/83/87/91/99, 42800/14/17/19/27–28/31–32/41/44/48–49/69/78–79/86/92/96/98, 42900–01/04–05/12/16/32/36–38/40–41. |
| 1966 | 27 | 25 | 42700/02/12/15/34/36–37/39–40/65/82/89/95, 42801/03/12/59/61/63, 42908–09/13/17/19/24. |
| 1967 | 2 | 2 | 42727, 42942. |

== Accidents and incidents ==
- On 23 February 1937, an express freight train hauled by locomotive No. 2765 was derailed at West Hampstead, Middlesex.
- On 27 August 1950, locomotive No. 42885 was in a collision Penmaenmawr, Denbighshire. The engine was shunting when it was inadvertently diverted onto the mainline. The Irish Mail, hauled by LMS Rebuilt Royal Scot Class 4-6-0 No. 46119 Lancashire Fusilier, collided with it from behind. 6 people were killed in the accident.
- On 19 May 1957, locomotive No. 42806 was derailed at Parkhouse, Ayr.
- On 21 January 1960, in the Settle rail crash, a freight train derailed following damage to the track from a failed connecting rod assembly on a passenger locomotive on the adjacent track. The derailed locomotive, No. 42881, struck the stopped passenger train, killing 5 passengers and injuring 8 more.

== Nicknames ==
These locomotives were referred to by train spotters as "Crabs", although the term "Horwich mogul" was preferred by the LMS. Several authors have claimed that this refers to the resemblance to a crab's pincers of the outside cylinders and valve motion. Another suggestion is that the nickname refers to the "scuttling" motion felt on the footplate when the engine is being worked hard, due largely to the inclined cylinders, producing a sensation that it is walking along the track. In some areas they also received the nickname "frothblowers" from their tendency to prime easily when the boiler was overfilled, or the feedwater contaminated.

== Preservation ==
Three locomotives (13000, 13065 & 13159) have been preserved.

Note: Engine numbers in bold mean their current number.

| Numbers | | | Built | Builder | Withdrawn | Service Life | Location | Condition | Notes |
| Original | LMS 1933 | BR | Built | Builder | Withdrawn | Service Life | Location | Condition | Notes |
|---|---|---|---|---|---|---|---|---|---|
| **13000** | 2700 | 42700 | Jun 1926 | Horwich Works | Nov 1964 | 39 Years 9 Months | National Railway Museum, York | Static Display | The first-built locomotive, 2700 is part of the National Railway Collection and currently on static display. |
| **13065** | 2765 | 42765 | Aug 1927 | Crewe Works | Dec 1966 | 39 Years 3 Months | East Lancashire Railway | Undergoing Overhaul | Returned to service in 2014 following an overhaul wearing crimson lake livery and pre-LMS number 13065. It is currently the only Crab to have also run in preservation. In January 2016, 13065 operated with Flying Scotsman: due to the extensive repairs to Flying Scotsman, it needed to be eased into full operation and relied on several steam and diesel engines including 13065 to aid it for health and safety reasons (including Passenger safety). In May 2018 it was discovered that a number of the engine's flue tubes had failed; rather than replacing the damaged ones it was decided to completely retube the engine's boiler. As of 2025, 13065 is still out of service. In April 2020, the overhaul was setback when it was discovered that £10,000 worth of fittings were stolen in the previous month. |
| 13159 | 2859 | 42859 | Mar 1930 | Crewe Works | Dec 1966 | 36 Years 9 Months | Private Site | Awaiting Restoration | 42859 had been stored at RAF Binbrook in a dismantled state since 1995 whilst the owner undertook its restoration. However, in November 2012, after the driving wheels and tender frame were removed without the owner's permission, an injunction was obtained to prevent any further disturbance. The driving wheels were later found by the police during a raid of a nearby industrial unit in an unrelated operation; the owner of the premises was served with a notice preventing the wheels' removal. In June 2013, it was announced that the matter had been classified as a civil dispute by Lincolnshire Police and would be pursued through the courts. The boiler and frames were removed from storage in Binbrook under police supervision and moved to a secret location. Legal proceedings for the return of the wheels and tender frame are underway. The boiler was subsequently sold to a Nottingham scrapyard having by the owner to pay for the costs of moving it from Binbrook. The owner stated that it was beyond economic repair and that he retained sufficient parts for a replacement. The wheels remain at RAF Binbrook under a court order. |

== Models ==
Models exist in 00 gauge. An old model was produced by Lima, and an updated model has since been produced by Bachmann. N gauge models are produced by Graham Farish.
