= L&YR Class 23 =

British steam locomotive class (1891–1964)

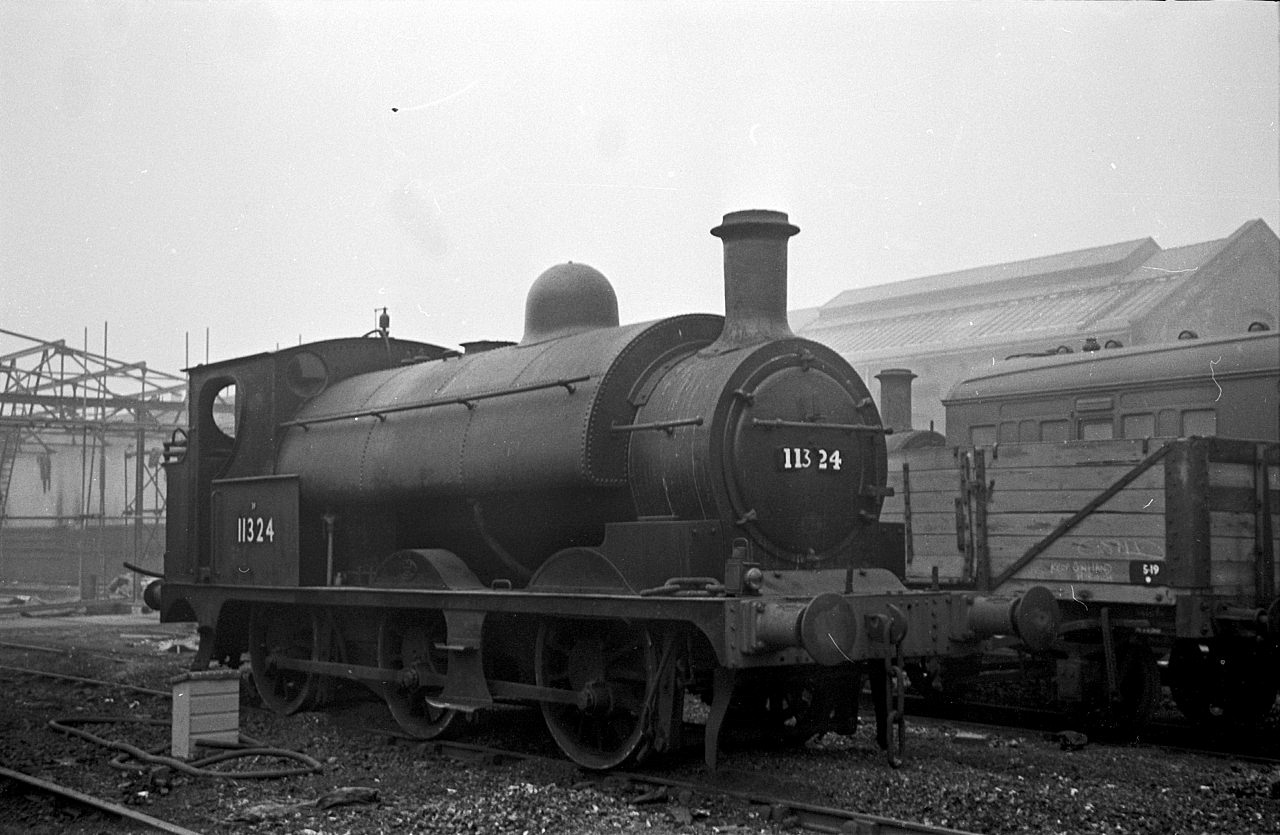
- 11324 at Horwich works in 1963
Type and origin
- Power type: Steam
- Designer: John Aspinall
- Total produced: 230
- Rebuild date: 1891-1900
Specifications
- Configuration
  - Whyte: 0-6-0ST
  - UIC: C n2t
- Gauge: 4 ft 8 1/2 in (1,435 mm) standard gauge
- Driver dia.: 4 ft 6 in (1.37 m)
- Wheelbase: 15 ft (4.6 m)
- Length: 31 ft 2 1/4 in (9.506 m)
- Height: 12 ft 2 1/4 in (3.715 m)
- Axle load: 15 long tons 3 cwt (33,900 lb or 15.4 t)
- Loco weight: 43 long tons 17 cwt (98,200 lb or 44.6 t)
- Fuel type: coal
- Water cap.: 932 imp gal (4,240 L)
- Firebox
  - Grate area: 19 1/4 sq ft (1.79 m^{2})
- Boiler pressure: 140 psi (970 kPa)
- Heating surface
  - Firebox: 97 sq ft (9.0 m^{2})
  - Tubes: 945 sq ft (87.8 m^{2})
- Cylinders: Two, inside
- Cylinder size: 17 1/2 in × 26 in (444 mm × 660 mm)
Performance figures
- Tractive effort: 17,545 lbf (78,040 N)
Career
- Class: L&YR: 23
- Withdrawn: 1926-1964
- Disposition: One preserved, remainder scrapped

The Lancashire and Yorkshire Railway (L&YR) Class 23 is a class of 0-6-0ST steam locomotive. Their main use was for shunting and for short-trip freight working.

== Construction ==
The Class 23 0-6-0ST locomotives were initially built in 1876–87 by L&Y locomotive superintendent Barton Wright as a class of 280 0-6-0 tender engines. 230 of these were rebuilt as saddle tanks at Horwich Works by Aspinall between 1891 and 1900.

== Ownership changes ==
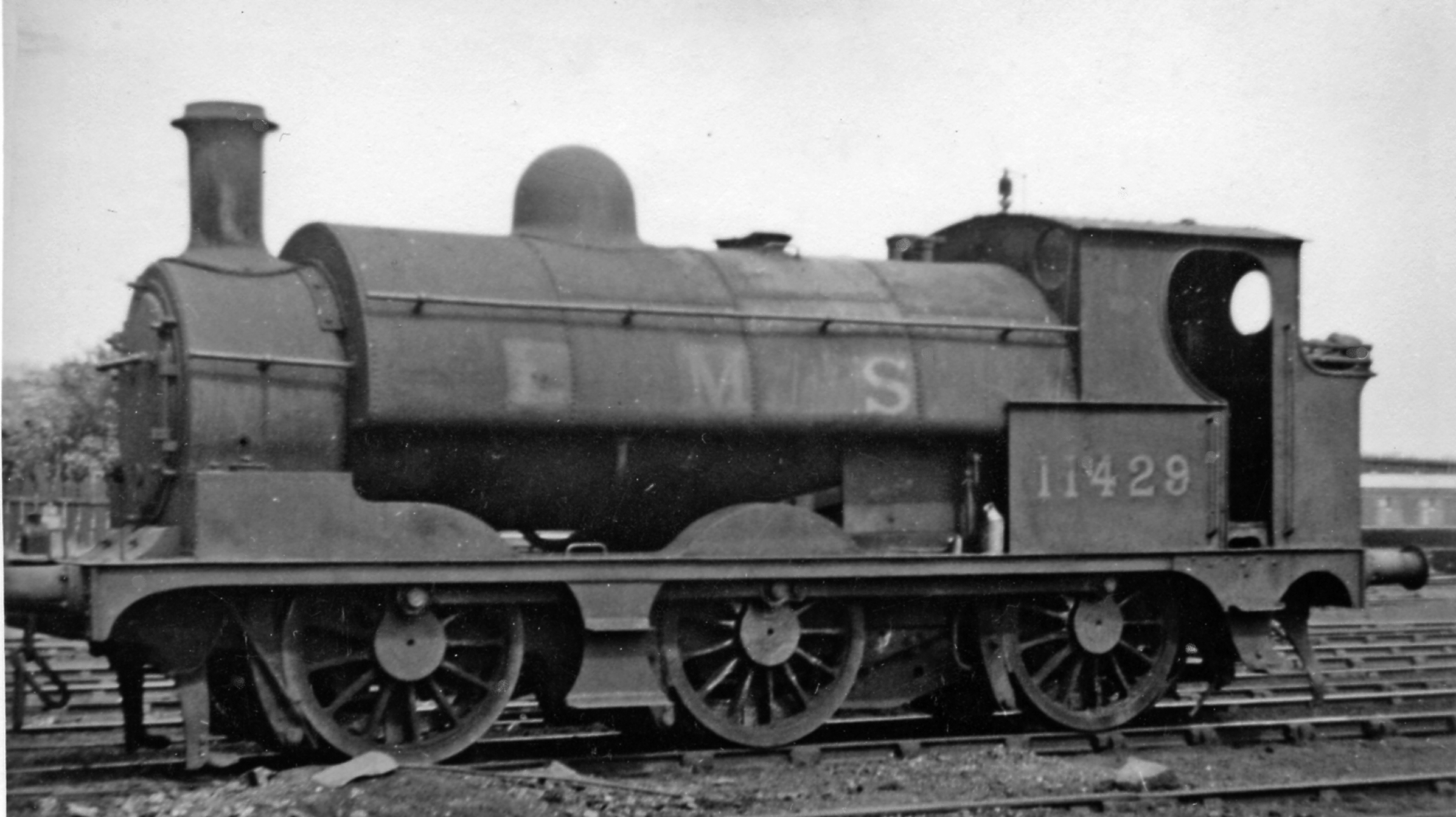
EX-L&YR 0-6-0 saddle-tank No. 11429 at Low Moor Locomotive Depot 25 May 1947

The class was long-lived, with the first engine being withdrawn in 1926 by the London, Midland and Scottish Railway and the last surviving in use until 1964 with British Railways London Midland Region. 101 were in service at Nationalisation, 20 still in service in 1961.

== Preservation ==
One locomotive, L&YR 752 (LMS 11456 but sold into colliery service in 1937), is preserved by the Lancashire and Yorkshire Railway Trust, having been acquired by the NCB for continued operation and as of October 2019 could move under its own steam despite overhaul being incomplete. This progressed at the East Lancashire Railway in Bury using primarily their resources in close cooperation with the current owners of 752. The locomotive was featured on an episode of the television programme "Steam Train Britain" which showed the locomotive under rebuild. Since January 2020 752 has temporarily carried the early British Railways livery as 51456 had it not been sold to industry, and featured in various events in steam before a complete public relaunch in the East Lancashire Railway Gala event on 6–8 March 2020.

After a period running as L&Y 752 and LMS Horwich 'service' loco 11305, the owners, Lancashire and Yorkshire Railway Trust, agreed in 2024 that the loco could be reliveried as LMS 11456, the number it carried during its colliery service - including throughout NCB ownership. It has made visits to a number of other railways and has always been well received.

A sister locomotive, L&YR Class 25 no. 957, an 0-6-0 in as-built original tender configuration, was also bought for preservation in 1959 and has been based at the Keighley and Worth Valley Railway since 1965.
