= L&YR Class 25 =

British steam locomotive class (1876–1900)

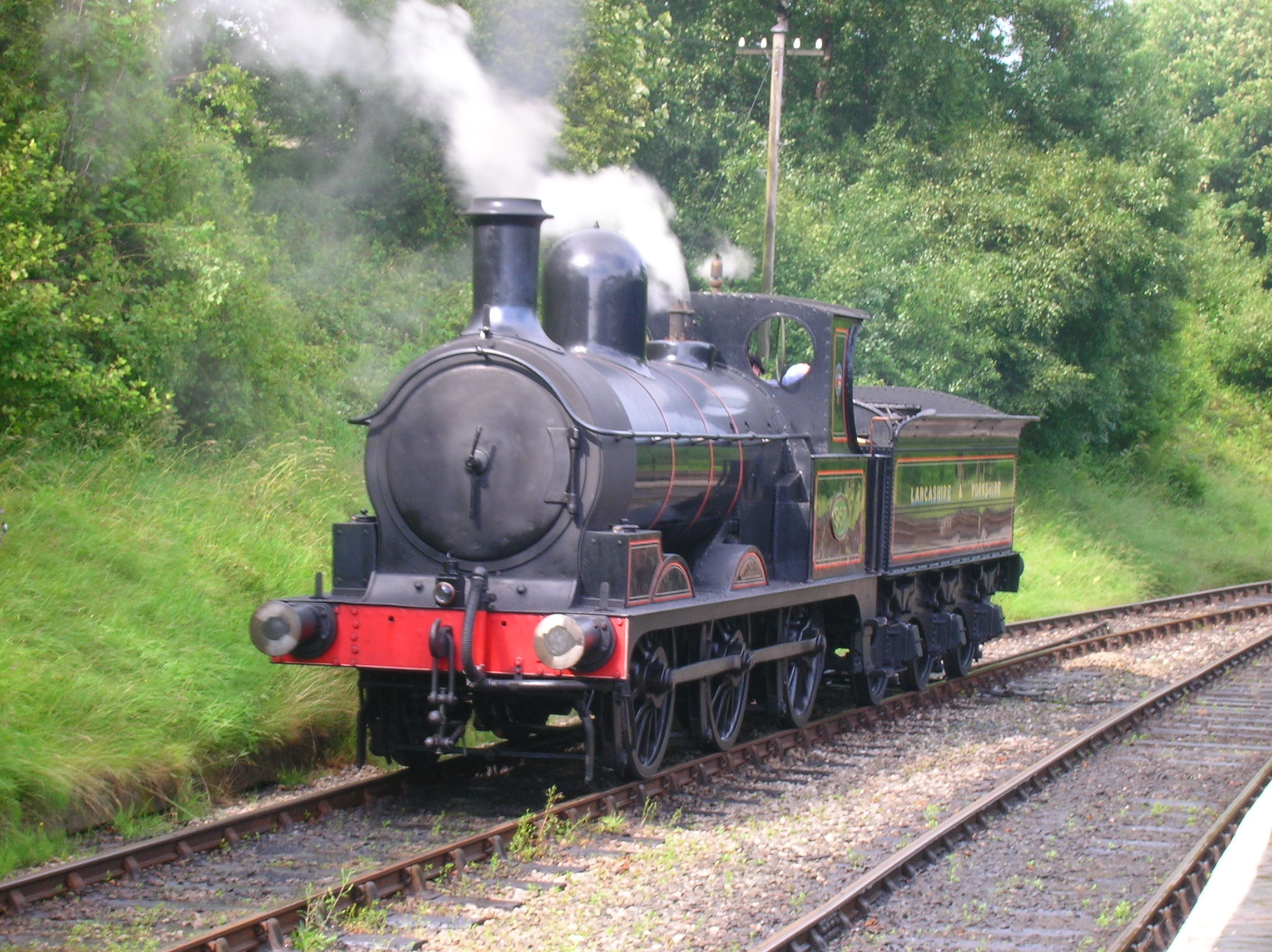
- Preserved No. 957 on the Keighley & Worth Valley Railway in 2008 wearing L&YR lined black livery.
Type and origin
- Power type: Steam
- Designer: William Barton Wright
- Build date: 1876-1887
- Total produced: 280
Specifications
- Configuration
  - Whyte: 0-6-0
- Gauge: 4 ft 8 1/2 in (1,435 mm) standard gauge
- Driver dia.: 4 ft 6 in (1.372 m)
- Loco weight: 39 long tons 1 cwt (87,500 lb or 39.7 t)
- Fuel type: Coal
- Boiler pressure: 140 psi (970 kPa)
- Cylinders: 2 inside
- Cylinder size: 17 1/2 in × 26 in (444 mm × 660 mm)
Performance figures
- Tractive effort: 17,545 lbf (78,040 N)
Career
- Power class: LMS 2F
- Numbers: BR: 52016-52064
- Disposition: 230 converted to L&YR Class 23, one preserved, remainder scrapped. One Class 23 preserved.

The Lancashire and Yorkshire Railway Class 25 is a class of 0-6-0 steam locomotive. They were introduced to the Lancashire and Yorkshire Railway in 1876 by new locomotive superintendent William Barton Wright and 280 were built in total. Of these, 230 were later converted to saddle tanks by John Aspinall, to become L&YR Class 23. They were nicknamed "Ironclads" after the armoured warships being developed at the time.

== Ownership changes ==
The locomotives passed briefly to the London and North Western Railway (LNWR) in 1922 and then to the London, Midland and Scottish Railway (LMS) in 1923. The LMS gave them the power classification 2F. In 1948, the surviving locomotives (23) passed to British Railways (BR), which numbered them 52016-52064 (with gaps).

== Withdrawal ==
Withdrawals began in 1930 but 23 locomotives survived into British Railways ownership in 1948.

== Preservation ==
The last engine, BR 52044 (L&YR 957, LMS 12044) was bought for preservation in 1959 and has been based at the Keighley & Worth Valley Railway (KWVR) since 1965. It starred in the film The Railway Children as the Green Dragon. It was out of service from 1975 but was returned to steam in 2001 in its BR guise as 52044 before being painted in its L&YR guise as 957 a few years later. Its boiler certificate expired in early 2013. After a couple of years on display, overhaul started in July 2016.

A sister locomotive, L&YR Class 23 No. 752, rebuilt from Class 25 as a saddle tank by Aspinall after 1891, was also bought for preservation and was based at the KWVR alongside 957, until being moved to the East Lancashire Railway in Bury for complete overhaul.
