= Horwich Works =

Former locomotive works in Greater Manchester, England

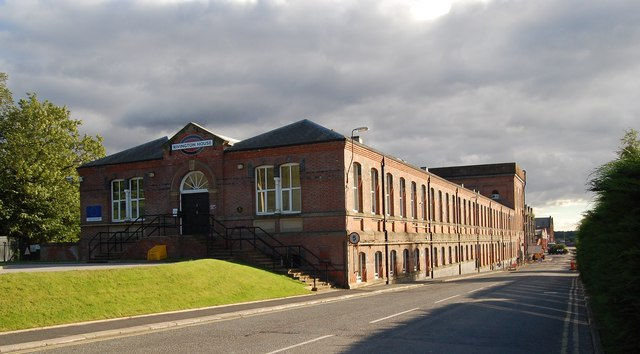
Rivington House, Horwich Works.

Horwich Works was a railway works built in 1886 by the Lancashire and Yorkshire Railway (LYR) in Horwich, near Bolton, in North West England when the company moved from its original works at Miles Platting, Manchester.

== Buildings ==
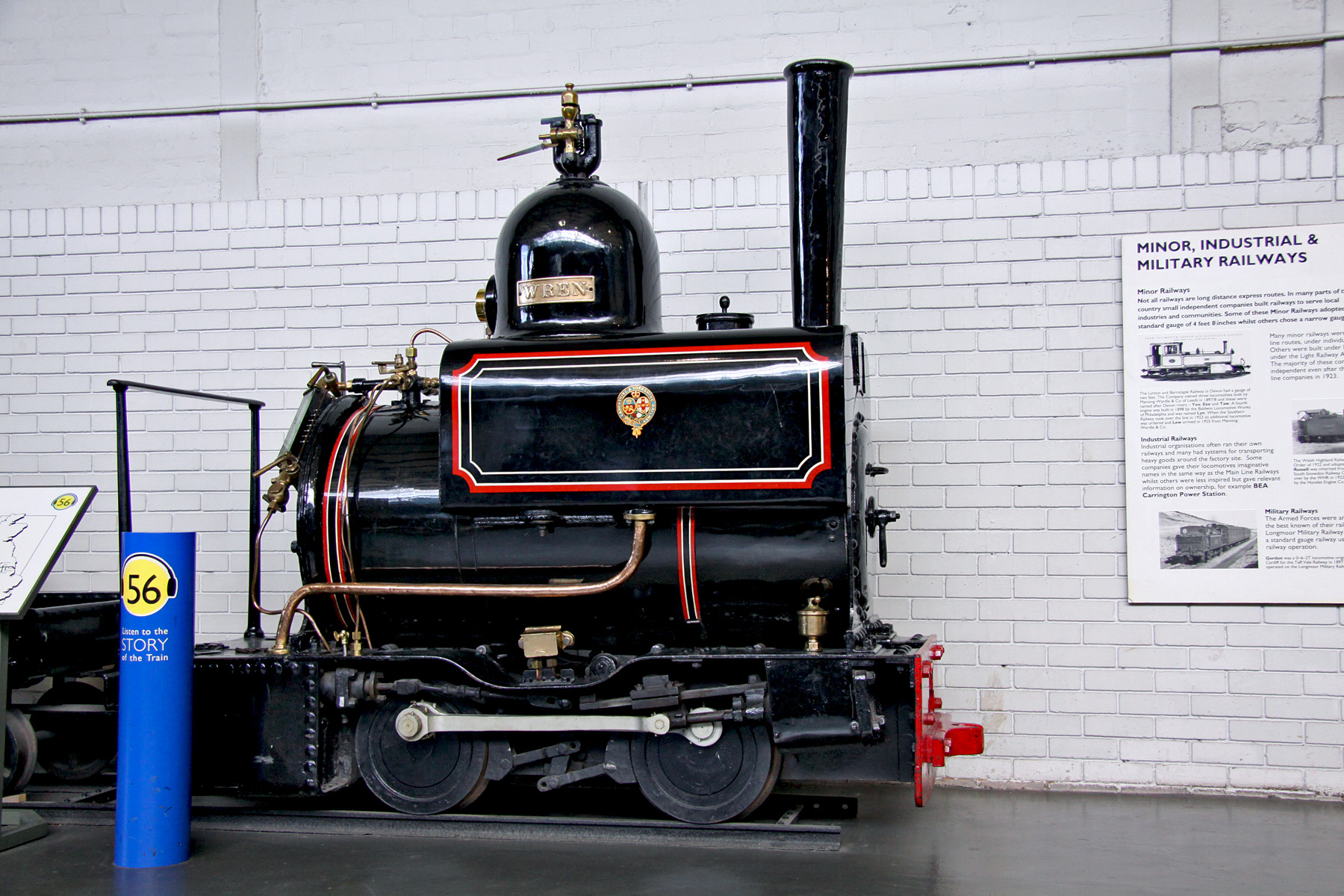
Wren, one of eight small locomotives used on the 18" gauge system in Horwich Works

Horwich Works was built on 142 hectares (350 acres) of land bought in April 1884 for £36,000. Rivington House, the first of several workshops was 106.7 metres (350 ft) long by 16.8 metres (55 ft) wide and opened in February 1887. The long brick built workshops had full-height arched windows and were separated by tram and rail tracks. Work to construct the three bay, 463.3 metres (1,520 ft) long by 36 metres (118 ft) wide, erecting shop began in March 1885. Inside were 20 overhead cranes.

An 18-inch (460 mm) gauge railway, with approximately 7.5 miles (12.1 km) of track was built to carry materials around the works complex, modelled on a similar system at Crewe Works. Two small 0-4-0 tank locomotives were bought from Beyer, Peacock and Company in 1887 to haul stores trains around the site, and six more were acquired at intervals to 1901. The first of these was bought from Beyer Peacock, but the remainder were built at Horwich. From 1930 they were gradually withdrawn from service, the last, Wren (a Beyer Peacock engine), was withdrawn in 1961 and was originally renovated and placed on display in the Erecting Shop. It is now preserved at the National Railway Museum.

== History ==
=== Early production ===
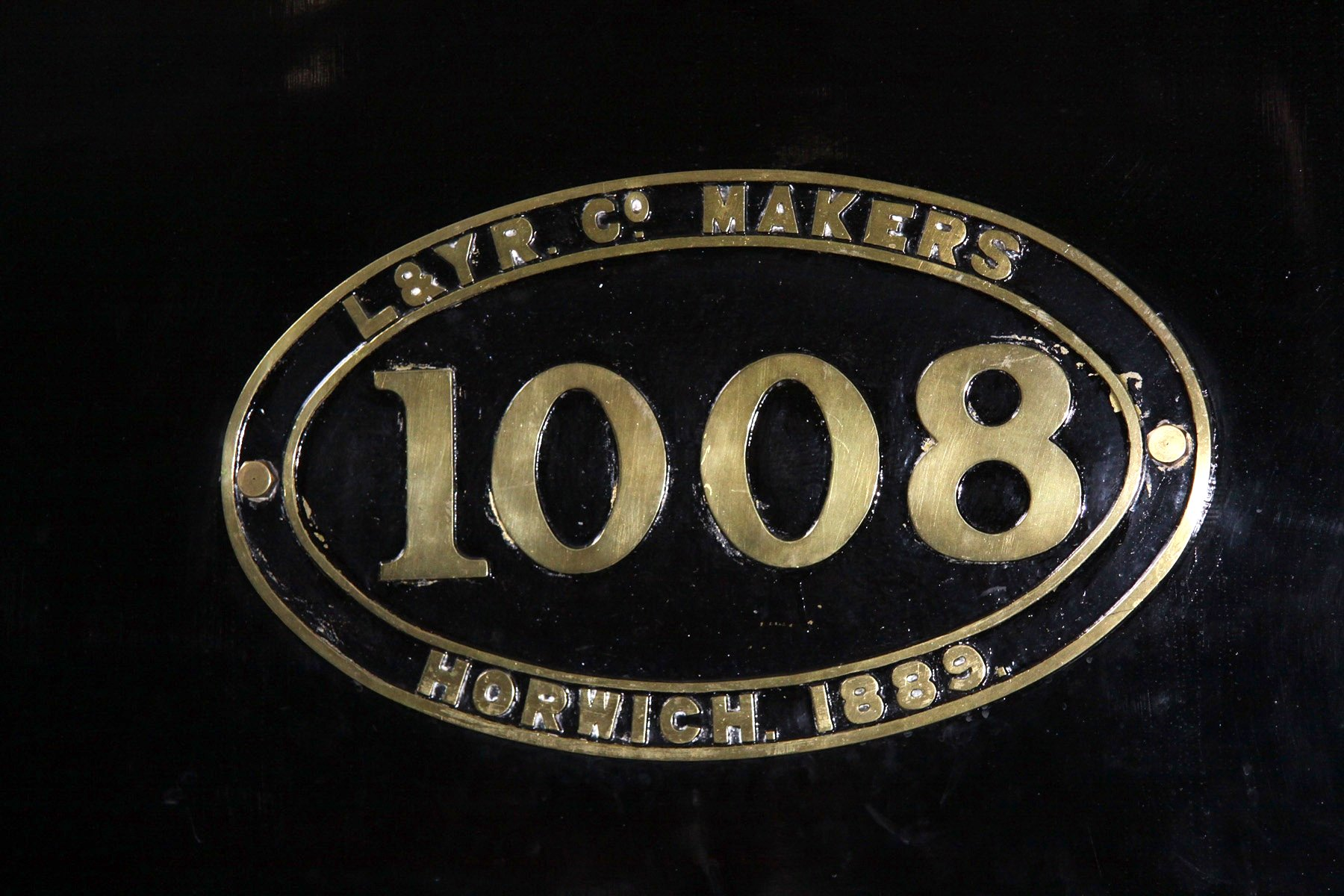
Number plate on L&YR 1008, the first locomotive built at Horwich (1889)

John Ramsbottom was hired from semi-retirement by the L&YR to advise on a new site for locomotive construction and repairs. Ramsbottom identified a greenfield site near Bolton as the most suitable, and oversaw construction of the works.

The first locomotive built by the LYR at Horwich, in 1889, was a 2-4-2 tank engine designed by John Aspinall. This locomotive was L&YR 1008 and is now preserved at the National Railway Museum. By 1899 a further 677 locomotives had been built, and another 220 under Henry Hoy. Between 1891 and 1900, 230 0-6-0 tender engines designed by Barton Wright were rebuilt as 0-6-0ST saddle tanks, LYR Class F16.

In 1899, the Aspinall-designed 'Atlantic' 4-4-2 express passenger locomotive was introduced and forty had been completed by 1902. Horwich works produced its 1,000th engine in 1907, a four-cylinder compound 0-8-0.

=== LMS ownership ===
In 1923 when the railway became part of the London, Midland and Scottish Railway (LMS), its Chief Mechanical Engineer was George Hughes, and he became CME of the LMS. In 1926 he was responsible for the design of a 2-6-0 mixed traffic locomotive of unusual appearance, which became known as the "Horwich Crab." The class proved extremely successful, and 245 locomotives were built, 70 at Horwich, including the first 30 examples. The "Crabs" continued in service with British Railways' London Midland and Scottish regions until the last two survivors were withdrawn in early 1967.

Three of the four post-grouping railways had Chief Mechanical Engineers who had served at least part of their apprenticeship or early career at Horwich. These were George Hughes and Henry Fowler of the LMS, Richard Maunsell of the Southern, and Nigel Gresley of the London and North Eastern Railway. Aviator Alliott Verdon-Roe also went on from Horwich to found the Manchester-based Avro aeroplane company.

During World War II, the works built nearly 500 Cruiser, Centaur and Matilda tanks.

=== Nationalisation and closure ===
After the nationalisation of British Rail in 1948, locomotive construction at Horwich continued at a high level for ten years. During 1948 twenty LMS Ivatt Class 4 tender engines were completed, twenty-seven followed in 1949, with twenty-four in 1951, followed by a single locomotive in early 1952.

Between 1945 and 1950, 120 LMS Stanier Class 5 4-6-0 tender engines were built at Horwich by the LMS (53 locos) and British Railways (67 locos). The last BR Standard design steam engine to be built was outshopped in 1957.

BR continued to overhaul steam engines for several more years. The last steam locomotive (Stanier LMS 8F 2-8-0 48756) was despatched after overhaul on 4 May 1964. In October 1969 it became part of British Rail Engineering Limited (BREL). Horwich continued in use as a works for other rolling stock up until it closed in December 1983. The foundry and the spring shop continued in use after this date, although the work force was reduced from 1,400 to 300.

In an effort to publicise the redevelopment of the site into small industrial units on 20 June 1985 locomotive 47491 was named Horwich Enterprise by Parliamentary Under Secretary of State for Transport David Mitchell at Horwich Works. The site was sold by BREL to the Parkfield Group in 1988 and the rail connection to the works was removed in 1989. The site is now an industrial estate, appropriately named "Horwich Loco Industrial Estate", with most of the buildings still in use.

Horwich railway station in the town centre, primarily used by employees at the works, was opened in 1887. It closed in 1965 with the last passenger train departing on 27 September 1965, hauled by 2-6-4T number 42626.

Locomotives built and modified, 1889-1957
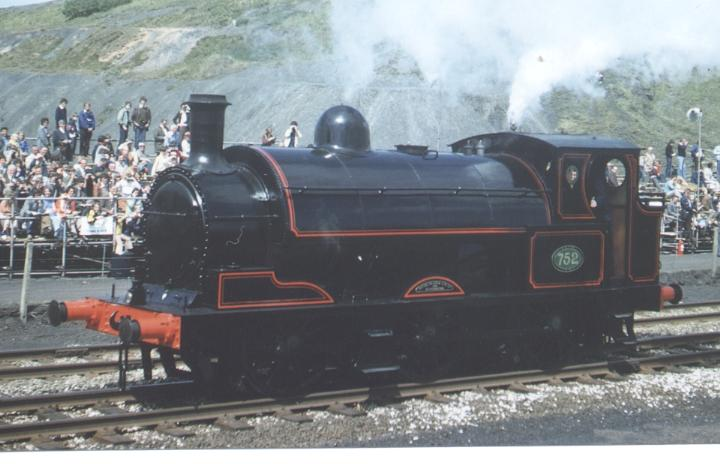
LYR Aspinall 0-6-0ST No. 752, rebuilt from a Barton Wright 0-6-0 tender loco at Horwich (at Rocket 150, 1980)

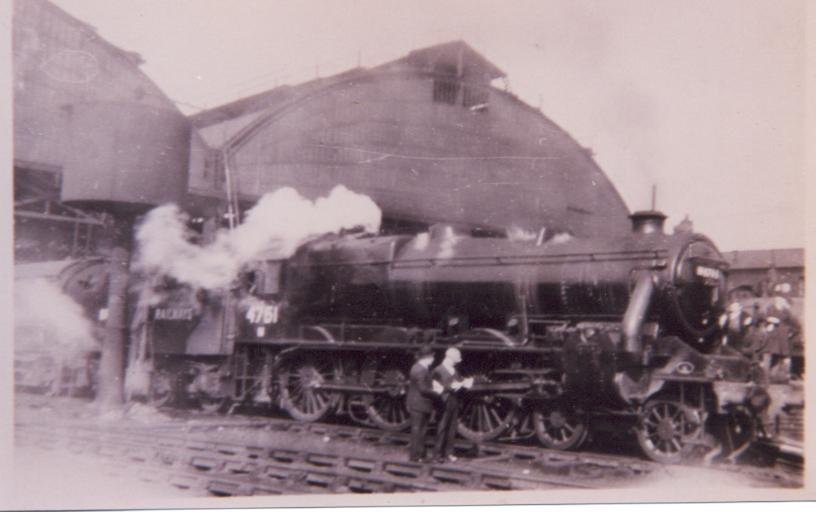
LMS Stanier Class 5 4-6-0 M4751 with Caprotti gear at Manchester, 14 days after completion at Horwich (1948).

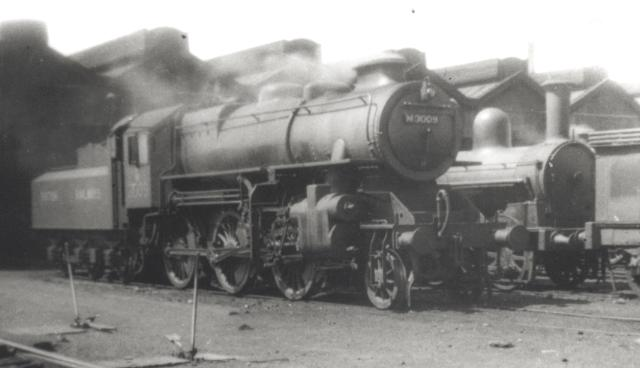
LMS Ivatt 4MT 2-6-0 M3009 (later 43009) with double chimney, shortly after completion at Horwich (1948)

== Redevelopment ==
The locomotive works site was designated a conservation area by Bolton Council in 2006. The site was proposed for mixed-use development in 2010 to include 15 to 20 hectares (37 to 49 acres) of land for employment and up to 1,600 houses within a timescale extending from 2013 to 2026. The proposal was adopted as council strategy in 2011, and supplementary planning guidance was released in 2012 designating part of the site for preservation.

An initial planning application was approved by Bolton Council in 2016. Work began in 2018.

Asbestos used to insulate steam engines and railway carriages linked to mesothelioma has been a legacy affecting former workers and their families with Asbestos dust also being carried in clothing. The redevelopment of the site required it to be cleared of contaminants before building commenced. Part of the site is planned for demolition for the creation of a link road in 2019, linking the Middlebrook Retail Park, M61 and Horwich Parkway railway station.
