= Locomotives of the Lancashire and Yorkshire Railway =

British steam locomotives

This is a list of the locomotives of the Lancashire and Yorkshire Railway (L&YR). The L&YR locomotive works were originally at Miles Platting, Manchester, but from 1889 were based at Horwich.

== Constituent companies ==
The L&YR came into being in 1847 when the Manchester and Leeds Railway changed its name. Locomotives added to its stock before that date came from the:

- Manchester and Bolton Railway (amalgamated 18 August 1846)
- North Union Railway (a share acquired 31 December 1846)

As the L&YR, locomotives were taken into stock from the:

- Preston & Wyre Railway, Harbour and Dock Co. (vested L&Y (two thirds) and L&NWR (one third) 28 July 1849)
- Blackburn, Darwen and Bolton Railway (amalgamated jointly with the East Lancashire Railway 1 January 1858)
- Liverpool, Crosby and Southport Railway (purchased 14 June 1855)
- Preston and Longridge Railway (taken over jointly with the L&NWR 17 June 1867)
- Blackburn and Preston Railway (amalgamated with the East Lancashire 3 August 1846)
- East Lancashire Railway (amalgamated as a separate division 13 August 1859, loco stocks amalgamated 17 March 1875 by adding 600 to East Lancs numbers.)
- Blackpool and Lytham Railway (amalgamated with the Preston and Wyre Joint Railway (L&Y/L&NW Joint) in 1871/2)
- West Lancashire Railway (amalgamated 15 July 1897)
- Liverpool, Southport and Preston Junction Railway (amalgamated 15 July 1897)

== The Miles Platting era ==
=== William Jenkins (Indoor) 1845–1867 & William Hurst (Outdoor) 1846–1854 ===
Although Jenkins was the Locomotive Superintendent the early years of this period saw Hawkshaw specifying the locomotives. As Hawkshaw was not a locomotive engineer the resultant locomotives were not of the best and were hopelessly outdated long before they were withdrawn. Hurst left to join the North British Railway in 1854 and Jenkins continued on his own.

No. of 1st built	Type	Quantity	Manufacturer	Date	Driving wheel diameter	Notes
54	0-4-0	37	Wm. Fairbairn (22); Edward Bury (15)	1847–49	4 ft 9 in	Between 10 and 13 rebuilt as 0-4-2
53	2-2-2	43	L&YR Miles Platting (26); Wm. Fairbairn (17)	1847–49	5 ft 9 in	Almost all (69) rebuilt 1867-72 as 2-4-0
62	2-2-2	10	L&YR Miles Platting (6); Wm. Fairbairn (4)	1847–49	5 ft 6 in	Almost all (69) rebuilt 1867-72 as 2-4-0
112	2-2-2	29	Bury, Curtis & Kennedy	1849	5 ft 10 in	Almost all (69) rebuilt 1867-72 as 2-4-0
202	0-6-0	2	E. B. Wilson & Co.	1849	4 ft 9 in	
163	0-4-2	35	L&YR Miles Platting (26); Wm. Fairbairn (9)	1849–70	4 ft 9 in	Two rebuilt in 1869 as 0-6-0
217	0-6-0	12	L&YR Miles Platting	1854–55	5 ft 0 in	
141	0-6-0	149	L&YR Miles Platting	1855–70	4 ft 10 in	Between 1878 and 1887 34 were rebuilt as 0-6-0ST, 18 as 0-6-2T and 3 as 0-4-4T
119	0-6-0ST	11	L&YR Miles Platting	1855–67	4 ft 0 in	
130	0-6-0ST	26	L&YR Miles Platting	1856–71	5 ft 0 in	
286	2-4-0	22	L&YR Miles Platting	1861–67	5 ft 9 in	

=== William Yates (Indoor) 1868–1875 & William Hurst (Outdoor) 1868–1875 ===
Following the death of Jenkins responsibility passed to Yates as Indoor Superintendent and Hurst returned as the Outdoor Superintendent. Hurst retired in 1875 and Yates resigned. A disastrous fire at the Miles Platting works in 1873 led to the building of the new Horwich Works.

The official system of numbered classes was not introduced until 1919, therefore classes are listed here according to the number of the first locomotive built.

No. of 1st built	Type	Quantity	Manufacturer	Date	Notes
4	2-4-0	23	L&YR Miles Platting (23)	1870–75	6 ft 0 in wheels, 16×24-in cylinders
4	2-4-0	4	ELR Bury works (4)	1873	6 ft 0 in wheels, 16×24-in cylinders
456	2-4-0	10	LNWR Crewe	1873	LNWR Newton Class
63	2-4-0	10	L&YR Miles Platting	1875–76	6 ft 0 in wheels, 17×24-in cylinders
103	2-4-0	1	L&YR Miles Platting	1875	5 ft 6 in wheels, 16×24-in cylinders
90	0-6-0	62	L&YR Miles Platting (62)	1869–72	
90	0-6-0	10	Kitson & Co. (10)	1871	
90	0-6-0	12	Yorkshire Engine Co. (12)	1875	
413	0-6-0	86	LNWR Crewe	1871–74	LNWR “DX” Class
23	2-4-0ST	1	L&YR Miles Platting	1868	
32	2-4-0ST	25	L&YR Miles Platting	1868–74	
403	0-4-0ST	5	LNWR Crewe	1872	
216	0-6-0ST	45	L&YR Miles Platting	1868–75	4 ft 0 in wheels
191	0-6-0ST	6	L&YR Miles Platting	1873–74	5 ft 0 in wheels
161	0-6-0ST	23	L&YR Miles Platting	1872–78	4 ft 6 in wheels

== The Horwich era ==
Note: The class numbers below are those introduced by Hughes in 1919. Each can cover several similar varieties, e.g. all the non-superheated 0-8-0s are Class 30

=== William Barton Wright (1875–1886) ===
During this period the Horwich Works was under construction and apart from a few built at Miles Platting, engines came from outside manufacturers.

No. of 1st built	Type	Quantity	Manufacturer	Date	LYR Class	LMS power classification	LMS nos.	Notes
605	0-4-2	8	Sharp, Stewart & Co.	1876	—	—	—	GNR class F2 diverted to L&YR
629	4-4-0	18	Sharp, Stewart & Co. (18)	1880–81	—	—	—	
629	4-4-0	30	Neilson & Co. (30)	1883–84	—	—	—	
629	4-4-0	20	Kitson & Co. (20)	1885	—	—	—	
629	4-4-0	20	Vulcan Foundry (20)	1886	—	—	—	
209	4-4-0	16	Vulcan Foundry	1887	2	1P	10100–10101	
111	0-4-4T	12	Kitson & Co. (12)	1877–78	—	—	—	
111	0-4-4T	10	Dübs & Co. (10)	1878	—	—	—	
111	0-4-4T	10	Neilson & Co. (10)	1879	—	—	—	
111	0-4-4T	40	Sharp, Stewart & Co. (40)	1885–86	—	—	—	
789	0-4-0ST	4	Manning, Wardle & Co.	1882	—	—	—	
883	0-4-0ST	2	Black, Hawthorn & Co.	1885	—	—	—	
885	0-4-0ST	1	Kitson & Co.	1885	—	—	—	
72	0-6-0ST	8	L&YR Miles Platting	1877	—	—	—	Similar to Yates "161" class but with 4 ft 0 in wheels
141	0-6-2T	8	Kitson & Co.	1880–81	22	1F	11600–11601	
243	0-6-2T	14	Kitson & Co. (14)	1881	22	1F	11602–11606	
243	0-6-2T	40	Dübs & Co. (40)	1882–83	22	1F	11607–11621	
528	0-6-0	57	Kitson & Co. (57)	1876–80	—	—	—	All converted to Class 23 saddle tanks (below)
528	0-6-0	18	Sharp, Stewart & Co. (18)	1877	—	—	—	All converted to Class 23 saddle tanks (below)
528	0-6-0	40	L&YR Miles Platting (40)	1878–81	—	—	—	All converted to Class 23 saddle tanks (below)
528	0-6-0	45	Vulcan Foundry (45)	1880–83	—	—	—	All converted to Class 23 saddle tanks (below)
528	0-6-0	50	Beyer, Peacock & Co. (50)	1881–82	—	—	—	All converted to Class 23 saddle tanks (below)
528	0-6-0	20	Kitson & Co. (20)	1885	—	—	—	All converted to Class 23 saddle tanks (below)
928	0-6-0	20	Vulcan Foundry (20)	1887	25	2F	12015–12034	
928	0-6-0	30	Beyer, Peacock & Co. (30)	1887	25	2F	12035–12064	

=== John Audley Frederick Aspinall (1886–1899) ===
From 1889 Horwich Works was completed and from that time all engines were constructed there.

No. of 1st built	Type	Quantity	Manufacturer	Date	LYR Class	LMS power classification	LMS nos.	Notes
978	4-4-0	30	Beyer, Peacock & Co.	1888–89	2 (Aspinall)	1P	10102–10130	
1093	4-4-0	40	Horwich Works	1891–94	3	2P	10150–10183	6 rebuilt with Superheater to become Class 4. One engine spent some time as a 4-cylinder compound. First 20 reused tenders from converted "568" class engines.
1400	4-4-2	40	Horwich Works	1899–1902	7	2P	10300–10339	"High-Flyers." First 20 reused tenders from converted "568" class engines.
1008	2-4-2T	270	Horwich Works	1889–1901	5	2P	10621–10869	26 rebuilt with Superheater to become Class 6
916	0-4-0ST	3	Vulcan Foundry	1886	21	—	11200	
1153	0-4-0ST	57	Horwich Works	1891–1910	21	—	11201–11257	
Dot	0-4-0WT	8	Beyer, Peacock & Co. (3); Horwich Works (5)	1887-1901	—	—	—	18-inch gauge, for use at Horwich Works.
	0-6-0ST	230	Horwich Works	1891–1900	23	2F	11303–11532	Rebuilds of "528" class tender engines
11	0-6-0	448	Horwich Works	1889–1918	27	3F	12083–12467	Many reused tenders from rebuilt "528" class engines. 63 rebuilt with Superheater to become Class 28
1351	0-6-0T	20	Horwich Works	1897	24	2F	11533–11546	
91	0-8-0	110	Horwich Works	1900–08	30	5F	12700–12759	Small boiler, 50 later rebuilt (see below)

=== Henry Albert Hoy (1899–1904) ===
No. of 1st built	Type	Quantity	Manufacturer	Date	LYR Class	LMS power classification	LMS nos.	Notes
202	2-6-2T	20	Horwich Works	1903–04	26	3F	11700–11716	
392	0-8-0	21		1903	30			First was experimental rebuild of "91" class, rest new, all with a corrugated cylindrical steel firebox. All rebuilt by Hughes (below).

=== George Hughes (1904–1922) ===
No. of 1st built	Type	Quantity	Manufacturer	Date	LYR Class	LMS power classification	LMS nos.	Notes
	4-4-0	6		1908–09	4	3P	10190–10195	Superheated. Rebuilds of Class 3
1506	4-6-0	20	Horwich Works	1908–09	8	3P	10400–10404	4-Cylinder, 15 rebuilt with superheaters (see below)
1522	4-6-0	70	Horwich Works	1920–24	8	5P	10405–10474	Superheated, 15 were rebuilds.
1	0-2-2T	2	Kerr, Stuart & Co.	1905	—	—	—	Railmotor locos. Withdrawn 1909 and replaced by following class.
3	0-4-0T	18	Horwich & Newton Heath Works	1906–11	1	—	10600–10617	Railmotor locos
816	2-4-2T	40	Horwich Works	1905–10	5	2P	10870–10899	Belpaire firebox, 18 later superheated to become Class 6
18	2-4-2T	64	Horwich Works	1911	6	3P	10900–10954	Belpaire & Superheated, 44 were rebuilds of Class 5
1501	0-8-2T	5	Horwich Works	1908	32	6F	11800–11804	
898	0-6-0	22	Horwich Works	1906–09	28	3F	12515–12536	Superheated
657	0-6-0	20	Horwich Works	1912	28	3F	12537–12556	Belpaire & Superheated
	0-6-0	63		1913–22	28	4F	12557–12619	Belpaire & Superheated, rebuilds of Class 27
1452	0-8-0	11	Horwich Works	1906–07	30 (Hughes compound)	5F	12760–12770	4-cylinder compound; first was rebuilt, rest new
9	0-8-0	73	Horwich Works	1910–18	30 (Hughes)	6F	12771–12839	Large saturated boiler, with Belpaire firebox. 33 were rebuilds, 40 new. 4 later rebuilt with superheaters as Class 31.
1546	0-8-0	15	Horwich Works	1912–21	31	7F	12840–12994	Superheated Belpaire boiler. 115 were new builds, others were rebuilds of Class 30 0-8-0s.
	2-10-0	not built		1914	2-10-0			A design for a heavy mineral loco, not constructed owing to the outbreak of war.
(1684)	4-6-4T	10	Horwich Works	1924	(none)	5P	11110–11119	Superheated. L&YR design introduced after grouping. Twenty more were ordered but were constructed as Class 8 4-6-0.
1629	2-8-0	27	Kitson & Co. (1); R. Stephenson & Co. (5); Nasmyth, Wilson & Co. (2); North British Loco. Co. (19)	1919	—	—	—	Robinson ROD 2-8-0 type. Hired from the government in November 1919, but transferred to GWR and LNWR March–June 1920. No L&YR numbers allocated
1	1-AA-1	1	Horwich Works	1912	—	—	—	Electric locomotive
2	B	1	Horwich Works	1917	—	—	—	Battery-Electric

== Notes on L&Y classes ==
The "number only" classes are those introduced by George Hughes in 1919 and shown in the L&YR working timetable appendix of 1921. There is also a series of unofficial "letter and number" classes which was devised by the author R. W. Rush, and which has been copied by some other authors.

== Picture gallery ==
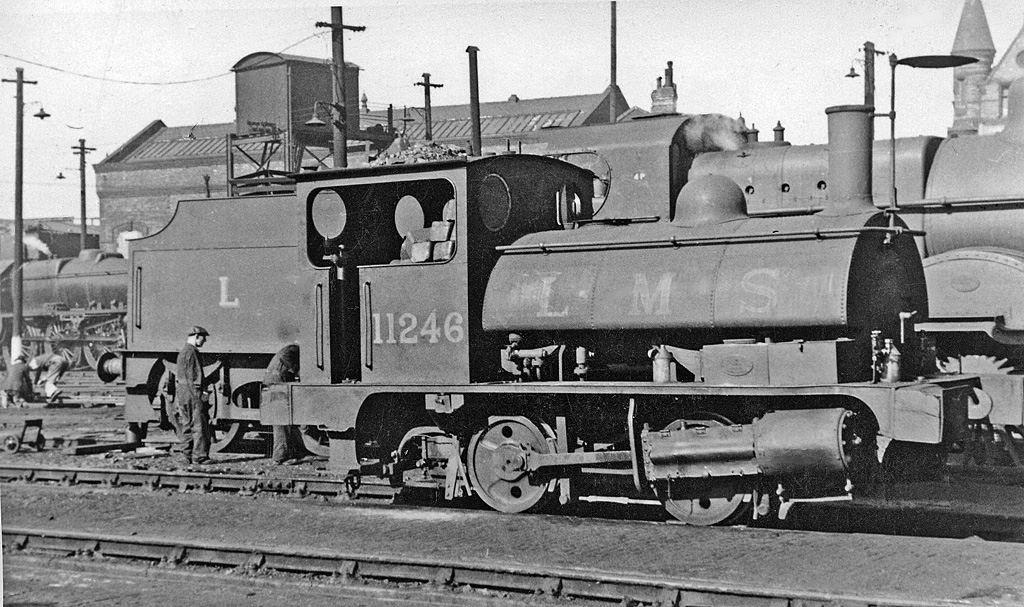
Bank Hall Locomotive Shed on 20 June 1948: an ex-Lancashire & Yorkshire 'Pug' 0-4-0T No. 11246.

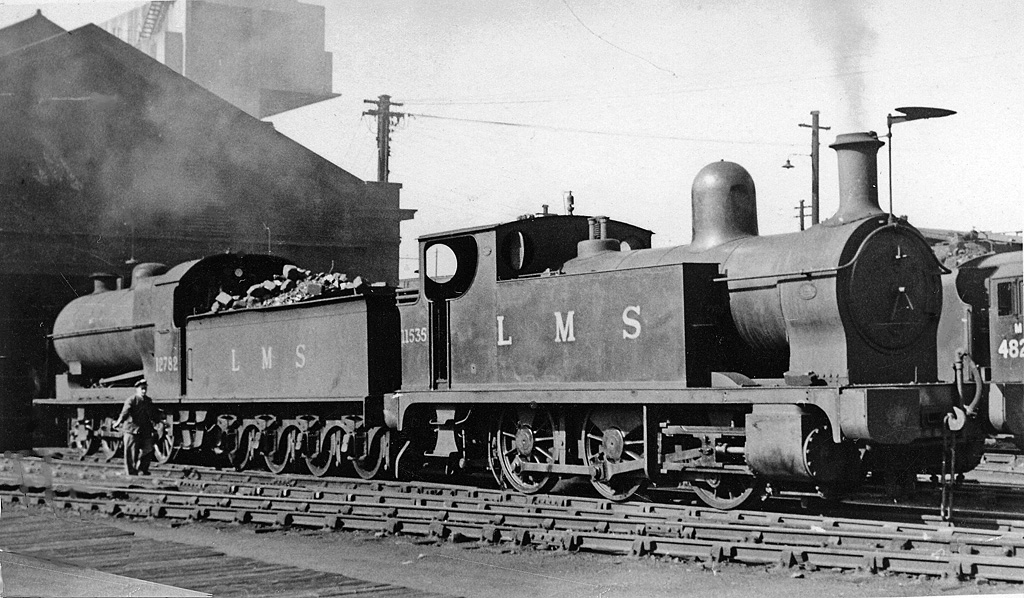
Bank Hall Locomotive Depot in 1948: two ex-Lancashire & Yorkshire engines, 1F 0-6-0T No. 11535 and Class 30 6F 0-8-0 No. 12782.

== Preservation ==
Seven locomotives survive, these being:

Image	Class	Type	L&Y No.	LMS No.	BR No.	Manufacturer	Serial number	Date	Notes
	23	0-6-0ST	752	11456	—	Beyer, Peacock & Co.	1989	1881	Rebuilt as saddle tank in 1896; sold to coal industry 1937; owned by Lancashire and Yorkshire Railway Trust, restored to steam in public service at the East Lancashire Railway at Bury in early 2020.
	Dot	0-4-0ST	Wren	Wren	Wren	Beyer, Peacock & Co.	2825	1887	18-inch gauge Horwich Works shunter; static display, National Railway Museum, York
	25	0-6-0	957	12044	52044	Beyer, Peacock & Co.	2840	1887	Owned by 957 Bowers Trust, awaiting overhaul, last used on Keighley and Worth Valley Railway in January 2013 but in 2021 restored to steam initially in green as the 'Green Dragon' as used in 1970 Railway Children film, now running as 52044 in BR goods black livery.
	5	2-4-2T	1008	10621	50621	Horwich Works	1	1889	Static display, National Railway Museum, York, currently on loan to East Lancashire Railway and on display at their museum at Castlecroft Yard, Bury
	27	0-6-0	1300	12322	52322	Horwich Works	420	1895	In regular use on preserved railways since 2009
	21	0-4-0ST	68	11218	51218	Horwich Works	811	1901	First preserved loco to arrive at Keighley and Worth Valley Railway in 1965, owned by Lancashire and Yorkshire Railway Trust, awaiting restoration at Keighley and Worth Valley Railway.
	21	0-4-0ST	19	11243	—	Horwich Works	1097	1910	Sold by LMS to private industry, now owned by Lancashire and Yorkshire Railway Trust, on display at Ribble Steam Railway for many years, in early 2020 relocated to the East Lancashire Railway at Bury and restoration to steam completed there in 2022.
