= Caledonian Railway 264 Class =

0-4-0ST locomotive class

Caledonian Railway 264 and 611 classes
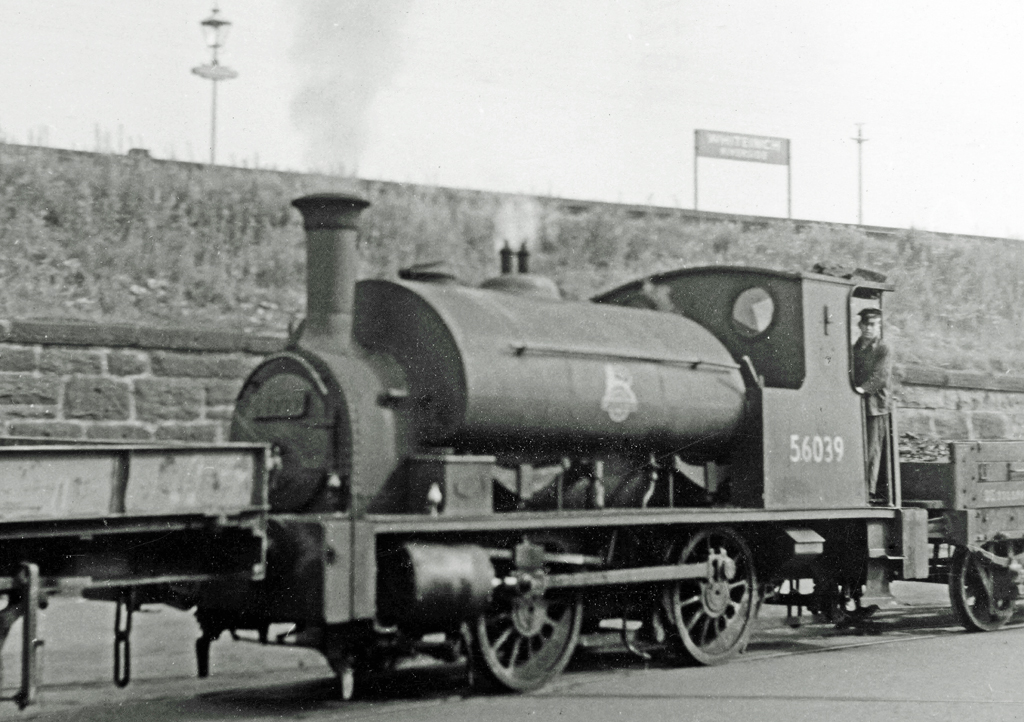
- 264 Class loco 56039 shunting at Whiteinch Glasgow in 1958. Built in 1885 as CR 269, later LMS 16039 and BR 56039. Note converted wagon acting as coal tender.
Type and origin
- Power type: Steam
- Designer: Dugald Drummond, John F. McIntosh
- Builder: Neilson and Company, St. Rollox Works
- Build date: 1885, 1889, 1890, 1895, 1900, 1902, 1908
- Total produced: 34
Specifications
- Configuration
  - Whyte: 0-4-0ST
  - UIC: B n2t
- Gauge: 1,435 mm (4 ft 8 1/2 in)
- Driver dia.: 3 ft 8 in (1.12 m)
- Length: 22 ft 3 3/4 in (6.801 m)
- Loco weight: 27.375 long tons (27.814 t)
- Tender weight: 6 long tons (6.1 t; 6.7 short tons)
- Fuel type: coal
- Fuel capacity: 2 long tons (2.0 t)
- Water cap.: 800 imp gal (3,600 L; 960 US gal)
- Boiler pressure: 140 psi (970 kPa)
- Cylinders: 2, outside
- Cylinder size: 14 in × 20 in (360 mm × 510 mm)
Performance figures
- Tractive effort: 10,601 lbf (47.16 kN)
Career
- Operators: CR » LMS » BR; Same type also operated by other companies.
- Class: 0F
- Nicknames: Pug
- Axle load class: CR/LMS/BR: Route availability 2
- Locale: Scottish Region
- Withdrawn: 1924–1962
- Disposition: All scrapped

The Caledonian Railway 264 and 611 classes were 0-4-0ST locomotives designed by Dugald Drummond and built by Neilson and Company in 1885. Later examples were built at St Rollox Works under the direction of John F. McIntosh in 1895, 1900, 1902 and 1908.

== History ==
These small shunters remained in long service under the LMS (who gave all Neilson saddle locomotives the power class 0F, shared by many other types) and British Railways, with the last of the class withdrawn in 1962. The two classes, sometimes referred to by the generic term "pugs", were mainly used as works shunters in the area around Glasgow, Scotland, often running with home-made tenders to improve their small coal capacity. Like most 0-4-0 tanks of the period they had outside cylinders and inside slide valves driven by Stephenson valve gear. A number were later sold into private industry and several even made it as far south as Crewe, where they acted as works shunters in British Railways days. None have survived into preservation.

They are easily confused with the earlier 1882-built ex-LNER Class Y9 (NBR G Class), also designed by Dugald Drummond to a similar saddle tank design, although the 264/611 are distinguished by a taller chimney and larger circular windows. Both were originally commissioned from Drummond by Neilson & Co to a standard design and were used by North British, LNER and British Railways. One NBR Y-9 shunter (No. 42 68095) has been preserved at the Bo'ness and Kinneil Railway museum.

== Construction ==
Construction was spread over several years, and eventually totalled 34 locomotives, as follows:

Order	Built	Numbers	Quantity
Y1	1885	264–271	8
Y22	1889	615–620	6
Y27	1890	510–515	6
Y43	1895	611–4	4
Y63	1900	621–6	6
Y68	1902	627–8	2
Y88	1908	431, 463	2

All were built at the St Rollox Works of the Caledonian Railway. Orders Y1, Y22 and Y27 were placed by Dugald Drummond and formed the 264 Class; the remainder were ordered by John F. McIntosh and formed the 611 Class.

== Smokey Joe ==
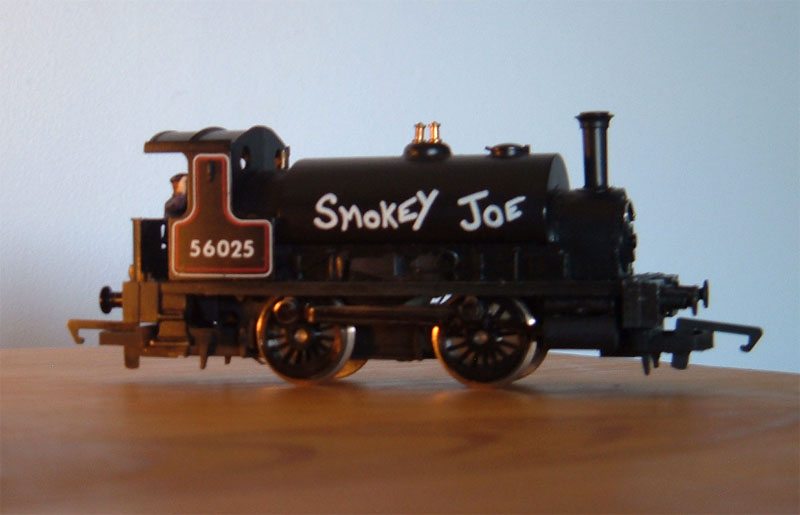
Smokey Joe 0-4-0 model

Smokey Joe is a model steam locomotive based on the 264 which has been in the Hornby Railways range since 1983 and has been highly popular, being regarded as a "permanent fixture" by the company. A 'starter'-level engine, it has also been the centrepiece of an eponymous train set in the Hornby range. The model was featured in the main Hornby Range up to 2010 and was moved into the entry-level "RailRoad" range in 2011.

Hornby's model has been in the Hornby range since 1980, initially in Caledonian Railway blue. The simplified 1983 "Smokey Joe" version omits the wire handrails that had been present on earlier variants. According to the 2011 Hornby Handbook, the model was originally launched as a "character" locomotive inspired by a Glaswegian engine which had "Smokey Joe" scrawled on its tank in chalk, an effect the model tries to replicate.

The actual number 56025 was an early 264 class built in 1890 and for its working life was primarily based at St Rollox Works, where it was the works shunter until its withdrawal in 1960. The livery of the model is based upon the mixed traffic livery of British Railways, black with red and white lining. Photographs of the original 56025 from 1955 show that instead of the graffiti, the engine had a lined saddle tank with an early British Railways "cycling lion" crest and, unlike the model, an enclosed footplate (as a works shunter, it would not have required a large quantity of coal). Most other members of the class were unlined black with an open footplate.

The model is powered by a small, 12 V "HP motor" of the same type as used in Scalextric slot cars, as well as the Hornby models of the British Rail Class 06 and GWR 101 Class. As a result, the locomotive has drawn complaints from some hardcore railway modellers that the motor is too fast for the engine to be realistic, with poor low-speed response. As a result, it is usually regarded as a children's toy or a beginners model, rather than a model for the serious collector and modeller. It does not come with DCC capability, although can be converted.

To commemorate Hornby's anniversary a special edition of Smokey Joe was released in 2020 featuring enhanced decoration and reinstated handrails along the saddle and the rear of the cab for the first time since 1983. This edition was limited to 2000 models.

== See also ==
- Locomotives of the Caledonian Railway
