= Pug (steam locomotive) =

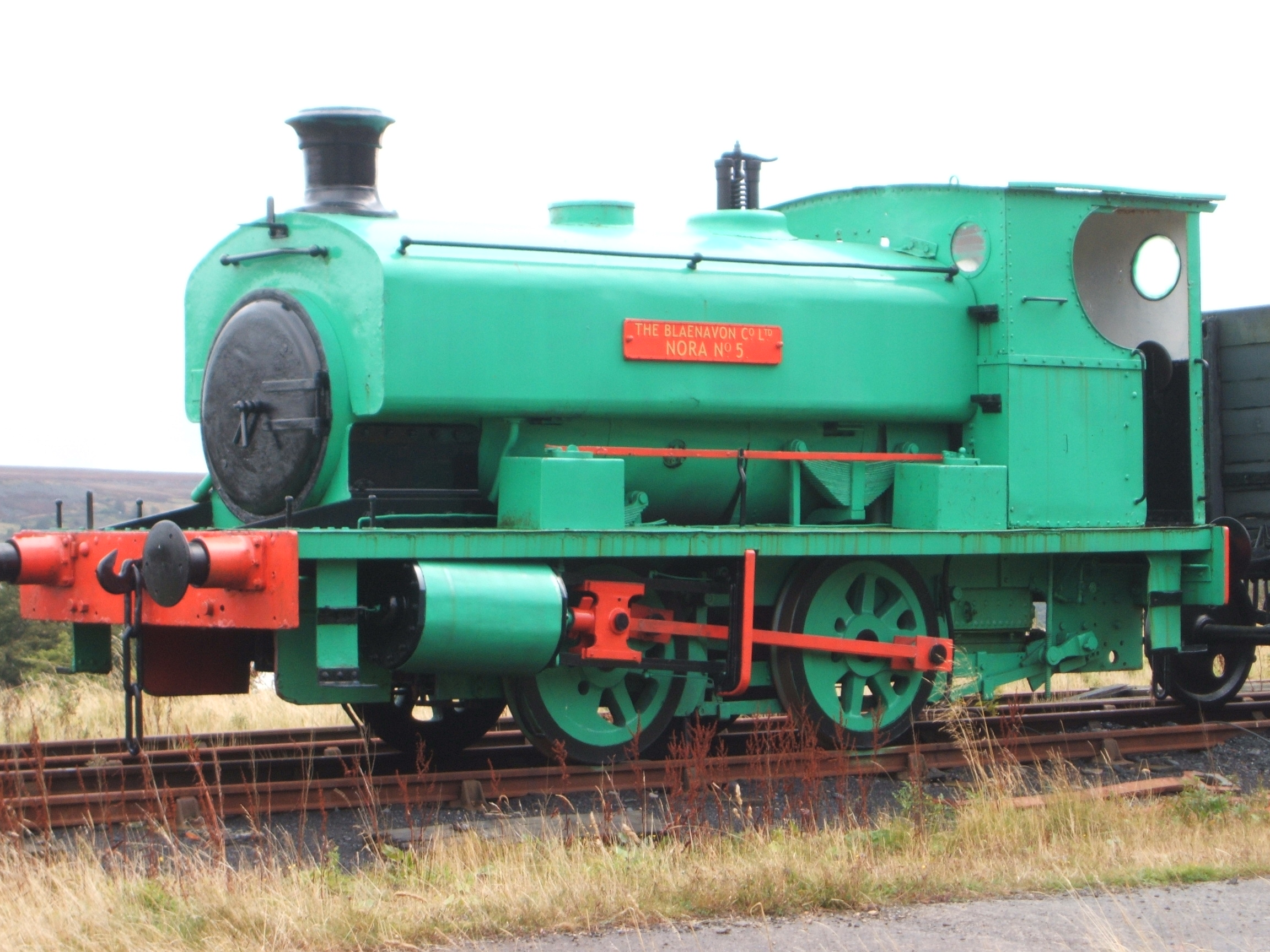
"Nora No.5", a typical 'Pug' built in 1912 for the National Coal Board, shown here at the Big Pit National Coal Museum in Wales.

'Pug' locomotives are small steam locomotives which were produced for light shunting work, usually at dockyards, factory sites, steelworks, collieries, and other similar locations. The name is derived from a common term in Scotland for a small industrial shunting engine, typically an 0-4-0 tank.

Whilst most commonly used for small shunting engines, on some railways the term 'Pug' was used for all tank engines. For example, the very large Glasgow and South Western Railway 540 Class 4-6-4T express passenger locomotives were known to their enginemen as the 'Big Pugs'.

== Etymology ==
‘Pug’ was a Scottish dialect word meaning ‘monkey’, and so inferring an ugly appearance. It is suggested that this led to the term being applied to the short and squat shunting engines.

An alternative suggestion is that the name is derived from the small sturdy Pug dog, an ancient and well known breed with a snub nose, wrinkled face, and squarish body. Most pug locomotives were saddle tanks, with an overall appearance that was flat-fronted, and squat or square.

== Examples ==
Many locomotive manufacturers produced Pug type locomotives, mainly for shunting work in areas with tight curves (such as industrial sites, docks, and harbours) for which 0-6-0 locomotives were less well suited, despite their greater tractive effort capabilities.

=== England ===
The Lancashire and Yorkshire Railway L&YR Class 21 is one example (of many) English light shunters that were nicknamed 'Pugs'. The Great Eastern Railway GER Class 209 is an example of a pug class first produced by Neilson and Company in 1874, with production later continued by the GER itself at its own works.

=== Scotland ===
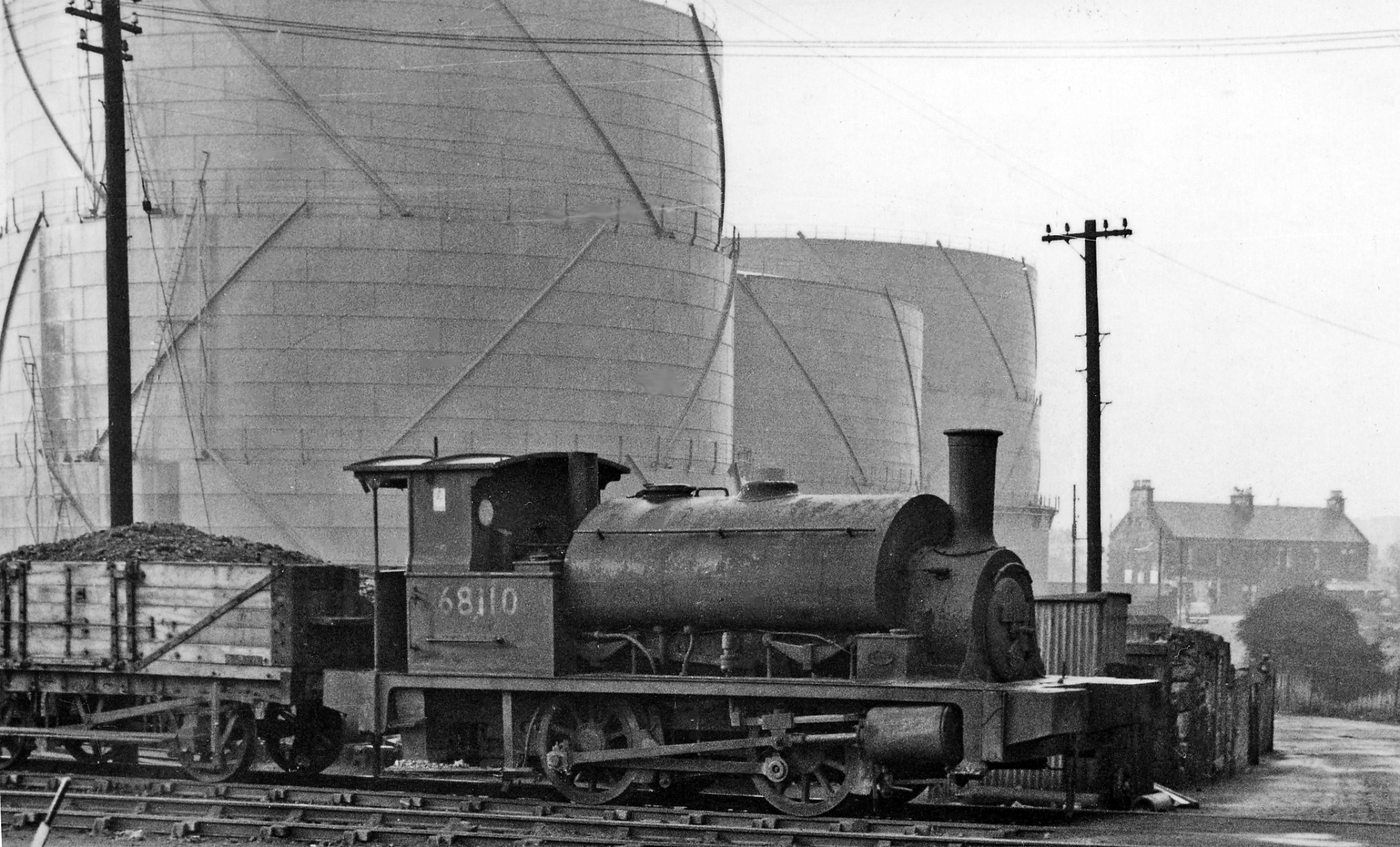
LNER class Y9 pug, originally a G class engine of the North British Railway in Scotland.

In Scotland, Neilson and Company designed and built a highly successful pug locomotive in the 1880s, subsequently licensing production to the largest Scottish railway companies. The Caledonian Railway bought four originals from Neilsons before constructing a further 34 at their own works, and designating them Caledonian Railway 0F class. The North British Railway bought two originals from Neilsons before constructing a further 36 at their own works, and designating them NBR G Class (commonly nicknamed 'Pugs' by North British staff). More than a hundred of this type of pug locomotive entered service across Scotland, and saw exceedingly long service, with the final examples being withdrawn as late as the 1960s.

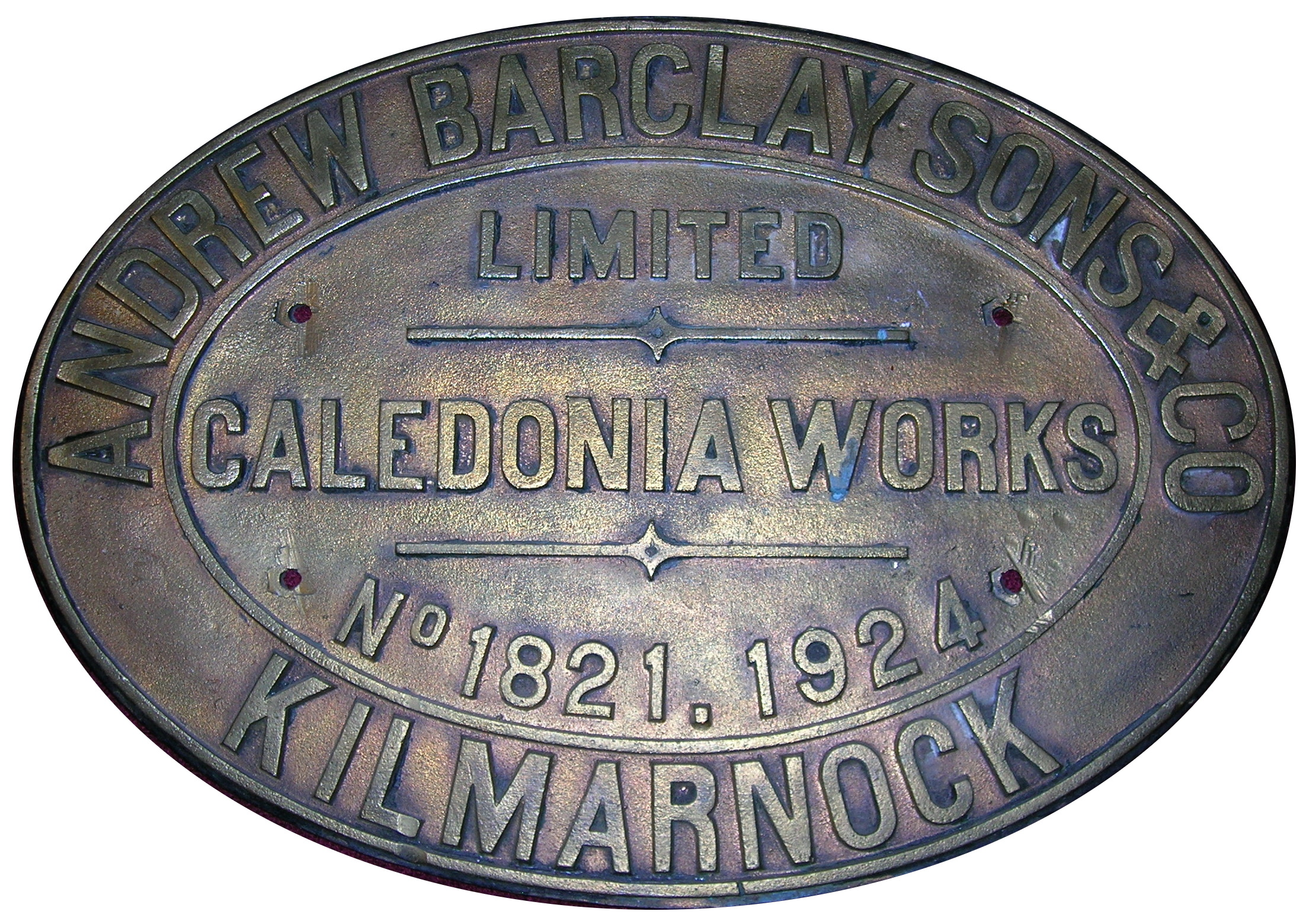
Maker's plate of Andrew Barclay number 1821, built in 1924

Works number 1821 (maker's plate illustrated), an 0-4-0 pug steam locomotive ordered from Andrew Barclay Sons & Co. on 12 February 1924 by the Auchlochan Collieries, was delivered to the customer in 1925 and worked at Mauchline Colliery number 7 pit in Ayrshire as Mauchline No.1 locomotive from the opening of the colliery until at least 1939, before ending its days at Bank Colliery as No. 15 until August 1969 and was scrapped shortly after this colliery closed.

=== Worldwide ===
Pugs were used worldwide, such as the metre gauge Black Hawthorn, an 0-4-0ST locomotive that was imported into India in 1873 for an irrigation project and shunted at Ajmer for several years in the later part of its working life. It can now be seen on a plinth outside the Ajmer works.

== In fiction ==
In The Railway Series books by the Reverend W. Awdry, a character called 'Pug' appears in the 12th book, The Eight Famous Engines. After problems of consistent accuracy of the drawings in the early books, later characters were based more closely on real locomotives. Although not explicitly identified by Awdry, the locomotive in the illustration by John T. Kenney, has been identified as most closely resembling a LMS Kitson 0-4-0ST.

== Railway modelling ==
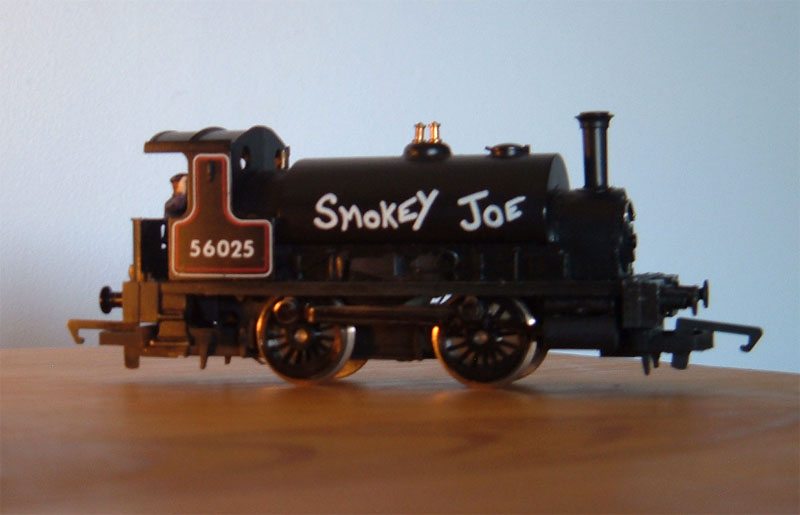
Hornby's Caledonian Railway 0F "Smokey Joe" model

The Hornby model railway manufacturing company have produced a 0-4-0 Caledonian Railway Pug locomotive and Dapol Model railways have produced a LMS branded ex-Lancashire and Yorkshire Pug. This model is now manufactured by Hornby.
