= Class 30 =

Class 30 may refer to:

- The original designation of the British Rail Class 31 diesel-electric locomotive
- EAR 30 class, East African 2-8-4 steam locomotive
- New South Wales C30 class locomotive, Australian 4-6-4T steam locomotive
- L&YR Class 30 (disambiguation), various steam locomotives
- NSB Class 30, Norwegian 4-6-0 steam locomotive
