= L&YR Class 30 (disambiguation) =

L&YR Class 30 may refer to any of the following steam locomotives:

- L&YR Class 30 (Aspinall)
- L&YR Class 30 (Hughes)
- L&YR Class 30 (Hughes compound)
