= Class 24 =

Class 24 may refer to:

- 24-class sloop, Royal Navy minesweeper
- British Rail Class 24, British diesel-electric locomotive
- DB Class VT 24
- DRG Class 24, German 2-6-0 steam locomotive
- GER Class R24, British 0-6-0 steam locomotive
- Hormuz 24-class landing ship
- J/24, sailing boat
- L&YR Class 24, British 0-6-0T steam locomotive
- NER Class P, later LNER Class J24, British 0-6-0 steam locomotive
- New South Wales Z24 class locomotive, Australian 2-6-0 steam locomotive
- South African Class 24 2-8-4, South African steam locomotive

== See also ==
- Type 24 (disambiguation)
