= William Barton Wright =

British engineer

- Born: William Barton Wright; 13 November 1828; Murton, North Shields, Northumberland, England
- Died: 7 May 1915 (aged 86); St Leonards-on-Sea, Sussex, England
- Children: Edward William Barton-Wright
- Engineering career
- Projects: Lancashire and Yorkshire Railway; Madras Railway; Assam Railways; Mines at Odemira, Portugal; Tea plantations Nilgiri

William Barton Wright (13 November 1828 – 7 May 1915) was an English mechanical engineer, also tea plantation owner and mine owner. He was Locomotive Superintendent of the Lancashire and Yorkshire Railway (LYR) from 1875. During his ten-year career in that post he helped to make the LYR one of the most efficient railways in the United Kingdom, by designing a range of good locomotives to haul the LYR's traffic.

== Biography ==
Barton Wright was born on 13 November 1828 at Murton House, near North Shields, Northumberland. His father was William Clark Wright, from an established family of merchants and shipowners in Tynemouth and Wallsend, Northumberland. His mother, Charlotte Sarah Parr, was of a family of Liverpool traders, merchants, mayors and (later) founders of Parr's Bank; and his maternal grandmother was Althea Barton, a member of the Manchester family of textile merchants. The Barton Wright family lived in Bayswater, London from 1839; Barton Wright's father died there in 1844, having dissipated the family fortune.

=== Early career and India ===
Barton Wright became an apprentice at the Swindon Works of the Great Western Railway (GWR) at the age of 17, under Daniel Gooch, who was related through his paternal aunt. There he served in the erecting shop, and then the drawing office, before becoming assistant to Archibald Sturrock, the works manager. Having completed his apprenticeship in 1851, he was given the charge of the GWR's locomotive depot at Paddington.

In October 1854, he was appointed the first locomotive, carriage and wagon superintendent of the Madras Railway, taking up his post at the Perambur Loco Works in March 1855. Locomotives supplied to the Madras Railway during this period were to the specification of John Hawkshaw; mostly 2-4-0 for passenger trains, 0-4-2 for mixed traffic, and 0-6-0 for goods. Barton Wright became a Member of the Institution of Civil Engineers on 7 December 1869, and a Member of the Institution of Mechanical Engineers in June 1878.

=== Lancashire and Yorkshire Railway ===
The Lancashire and Yorkshire Railway (LYR) was formed by amalgamation of several railways, some of which had their own locomotive repairing facilities. Following amalgamation, it took some time for these establishments to be consolidated, and the number of departmental heads reduced. For example, the Manchester and Bolton Railway had amalgamated in 1846 but its locomotives remained separate until Salford works was closed in 1849, when the work was transferred to the former Manchester and Leeds Railway workshops at Miles Platting.

In 1875, the facilities at Miles Platting were under the charge of William Hurst and William Yates, who were appointed outdoor superintendent and indoor superintendent respectively on 22 January 1868, both being in succession to William Jenkins. The locomotives of the former East Lancashire Railway were repaired at Bury, and were also the responsibility of two men: John Jacques, who was appointed outdoor superintendent on 24 April 1865, and George Roberts, who had been appointed indoor superintendent following the death of R. Mason on 15 October 1873. Hurst was due to retire in 1875, and the LYR board decided to replace all four men by a single locomotive superintendent, and the post was advertised in August 1875. A short-list of six names was chosen, and interviewed on 27 October 1875. This reduced the six names to two: Alexander McDonnell, of the Great Southern and Western Railway in Ireland, and William Barton Wright, who had been working for the Madras Railway in India.

Barton Wright was appointed chief locomotive superintendent from 1 November 1875, and the following day, Yates, Hurst, Jacques and Roberts were brought in and told that they would now report to Barton Wright. Hurst retired, whilst Yates and Roberts became works managers, at Miles Platting and Bury respectively. Jacques was given the opportunity to resign with six months salary.

Whilst Barton Wright was at Miles Platting, he designed five new classes of locomotive: an 0-6-0 for goods work, very similar to some being built for the Taff Vale Railway (the Taff Vale Railway L class), was introduced in 1876; an 0-4-4T for local passenger services in 1877; a 4-4-0 for express passenger trains in 1880; and two types of 0-6-2T – one in 1880 with 4 ft 6 in (1.37 m) coupled wheels for goods and the second in 1881 with 5 ft 1 in (1.55 m) coupled wheels for local passenger services. Two of these, the 4-4-0 and the 0-6-0, were perpetuated by his successor, John Aspinall, with small modifications.

The demands of the locomotive maintenance schedule together with the restricted capacity at both Miles Platting and Bury meant that most of the new locomotives had to be bought from outside firms, and these included some that were not of Barton Wright's own design. In 1876, Sharp, Stewart & Co. were building a batch of thirty 0-4-2 locomotives for the Great Northern Railway (GNR), to the design of Patrick Stirling, the GNR locomotive superintendent; but after twelve had been delivered to the GNR, the next eight were sold (with the permission of the GNR) directly to the LYR instead, where they became the 605 class; and Sharp, Stewart subsequently supplied the GNR with the last ten of their original order, plus a further eight to make up the shortfall. On the GNR, they were intended for mixed-traffic duties (and later formed Class F2), but the LYR mainly used them on express passenger trains. There were also several small 0-4-0ST for shunting, of various types, bought between 1882 and 1885. Barton Wright also rebuilt some of the locomotives of his predecessors, giving them a longer life.

The situation at Miles Platting was eased once the new carriage works at Newton Heath was opened in 1877, which allowed the locomotive department to take over the space at Miles Platting formerly occupied by the carriage and wagon department, which itself had largely been destroyed by fire on 27 April 1873 and rebuilt later that year. Following this expansion, it was possible to build additional locomotives at Miles Platting, and forty of the 528 class were built during 1878–81, but these were the last new locomotives built there. Space was still tight, and there was no room to expand the works any further, since the surrounding area was fully occupied with other buildings, including houses. In 1883, John Ramsbottom, the former locomotive superintendent of the London and North Western Railway (LNWR), was engaged by the LYR as "Consulting Engineer in matters relating to the Locomotive Department" and toured the whole LYR system with Barton Wright, looking at all the repair facilities. Ramsbottom gave his advice to the LYR Board on 19 March 1884, and it was decided to build a new locomotive works in open country, where expansion would be easier.

=== Horwich works ===
Various potential sites were examined by Ramsbottom and Barton Wright, and at a meeting on 21 May, they were informed by Elias Dorning, the LYR land agent, of an estate of 350 acres (140 ha) at Horwich. Ramsbottom, Dorning and Barton Wright went to examine the land, and having reported back to the Board, Dorning was authorised to purchase it for not more than £65,000. At an auction on 27 May 1884 he bought the land for £36,000. Together with Ramsbottom, Barton Wright began planning the new locomotive works, and construction began the following year. But before Horwich Works was ready to begin construction and repair of locomotives, Barton Wright tendered his resignation on 23 June 1886. Aspinall was appointed to succeed Barton Wright on 14 July 1886, with the new title of Chief Mechanical Engineer (a title which had previously been held by only one other person, Francis William Webb, Ramsbottom's successor on the LNWR). Locomotive repair at Horwich began on 15 November 1886; new construction commenced in January 1888, and the first new locomotive was delivered on 20 February 1889.

=== Other business interests ===
After retirement from Lancashire and Yorkshire railway, Barton Wright entered private practice as an engineer in London, and became a director of the Assam Railways and Trading Co. He acquired interests in tea plantations, including the Balmadies and Bitherookardu estates near Gudalur in the Nilgiri Hills in Southern India in the 1880s, later managed by his sons. He also invested with his son Edward William in mineral concessions at Odemira, in the Alentejo region of Portugal, without success, from 1885. In India, he had served as a major in the Madras Volunteer Guards (retiring in 1876).

Following the death of his wife in 1892, he retired to Dover, moving to St Leonards-on-Sea, Sussex in 1907, where he died on 7 May 1915 at the age of 86.

Barton Wright Road in Ayanavaram, Madras, is named after him.

== Family ==
Barton Wright married Janet Forlonge in 1858, whilst on leave in England. She was the daughter of William Forlonge, a pastoralist and politician in colonial Victoria and New South Wales, and granddaughter of the Australian pioneer breeder of Merino sheep, Eliza Forlonge. They had six sons and three daughters. His third son Edward William Barton-Wright was a pioneering promoter of Asian martial arts in the Western world: see Bartitsu. His sister, Lydia, married Sir Molyneux Nepean, 2nd Baronet, of Mapperton House, of Loder's Court, of Bothenhampton, Dorset, and of Lee Hall, Northumberland. He was the great-grandson of John Parr (merchant), of Liverpool.

== Locomotive designs ==
Outstanding orders for Yates designs, completed under Barton Wright
Class	Wheel arrangement	Years built	Builders	Number built	Notes	Ref
216	0-6-0ST	1875	LYR, Miles Platting	2	4 ft 0 in driving wheels, 15 in cylinders	
90	0-6-0	1875–76	Yorkshire Engine Co.	6		
63	2-4-0	1875–76	LYR, Miles Platting	10		
161	0-6-0ST	1876–78	LYR, Miles Platting	22	4 ft 6 in driving wheels, 17 in cylinders	
72	0-6-0ST	1877	LYR, Miles Platting	8	4 ft 0 in driving wheels, 17 in cylinders	

Barton Wright designs
Class	Wheel arrangement	Years built	Builders	Number built	Notes	Ref
528 or 25	0-6-0	1876–87	Kitson & Co. (77); Sharp, Stewart & Co. (18); LYR, Miles Platting (40); Vulcan Foundry (65); Beyer, Peacock & Co. (80)	280	Last 50 (20 from Vulcan Foundry, 30 from Beyer, Peacock) ordered by Aspinall	
111	0-4-4T	1877–86	Kitson & Co. (12); Dübs & Co. (10); Neilson & Co. (10); Sharp, Stewart & Co. (40)	72		
629	4-4-0	1880–87	Sharp, Stewart & Co. (24); Neilson & Co. (30); Kitson & Co. (20); Vulcan Foundry (36)	110	Last 16 (from Vulcan Foundry) ordered by Aspinall	
141	0-6-2T	1880–81	Kitson & Co.	10	4 ft 6 in driving wheels	
243 or 22	0-6-2T	1881–83	Kitson & Co. (14); Dübs & Co. (40)	54	5 ft 1 in driving wheels	

The forty 0-6-0s of the 528 class built in 1878–81 were the last locomotives to be built at the LYR's locomotive works at Miles Platting.

No. 553 of the 528 class, built in June 1877, was the last LYR locomotive to be withdrawn from service, in September 1964 – a life of 87 years. Like most of the others in its class, it had been rebuilt as an 0-6-0ST – this occurred in April 1891. It had also been renumbered to LMS no. 11305. It spent the latter part of its life as one of the works shunters at Horwich, and like other locomotives used there, was transferred to service stock and never given a BR number.

Other designs
Class	Wheel arrangement	Years built	Builders	Quantity	Notes	Ref
Craven	2-4-0	1876–77	LYR, Bury	6	One or two may have been rebuilt from older engines	
605	0-4-2	1876	Sharp, Stewart & Co.	8	Stirling design for GNR	
789	0-4-0ST	1876	Manning, Wardle & Co.	4	Purchased second-hand 1882	
883	0-4-0ST	1885	Black, Hawthorn & Co.	2		
885	0-4-0ST	1885	Kitson & Co.	1	Purchased second-hand 1888	

== See also ==
- Locomotives of the Lancashire and Yorkshire Railway

== Notes ==
Business positions
Preceded by William Hurst; William Yates; John Jacques; George Roberts	Locomotive Superintendent of the Lancashire and Yorkshire Railway; 1876–1886	Succeeded by John Aspinall
