= G&SWR 540 Class =

Class of British 4-6-4T locomotives

Glasgow & South Western Railway 540 Class
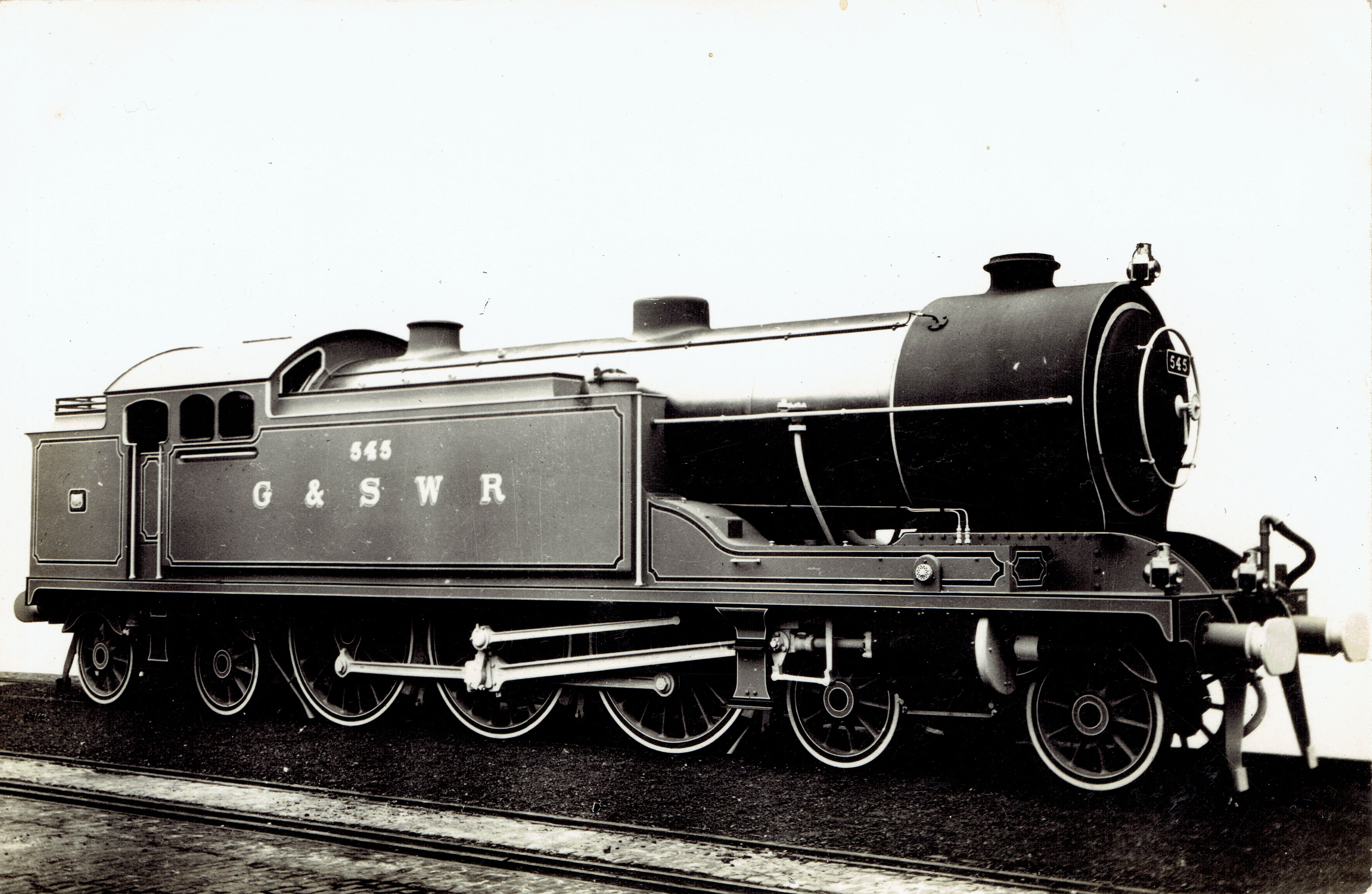
Type and origin
- Power type: Steam
- Designer: Robert Whitelegg
- Builder: North British Locomotive Company, Hyde Park Works, Glasgow
- Serial number: 22886–22891
- Build date: 1922
- Total produced: 6
Specifications
- Configuration
  - Whyte: 4-6-4T
- Gauge: 4 ft 8 1/2 in (1,435 mm)
- Leading dia.: 3 ft 6 in (1.07 m)
- Driver dia.: 6 ft 0 in (1.83 m)
- Trailing dia.: 3 ft 6 in (1.07 m)
- Wheelbase: 39 ft 0 in (11.89 m)
  - Leading: 7 ft 0 in (2.13 m)
  - Drivers: 6 ft 7 in (2.01 m) + 6 ft 7 in (2.01 m)
  - Trailing: 7 ft 0 in (2.13 m)
- Loco weight: 99 long tons (101 t; 111 short tons)
- Boiler
  - Diameter: 5 ft 6 3/16 in (1.681 m)
  - Tube plates: 14 ft 11 in (4.55 m)
- Boiler pressure: 180 psi (1,200 kPa)
- Heating surface: 1,730 sq ft (161 m^{2})
- Superheater
  - Type: Robinson, 21-element
  - Heating area: 255 sq ft (23.7 m^{2})
- Cylinders: Two, outside
- Cylinder size: 22 in × 26 in (559 mm × 660 mm)
- Valve gear: Walschaerts
- Valve type: Piston valves
Performance figures
- Tractive effort: 26,741 lbf (118.95 kN)
Career
- Operators: G&SWR • LMS
- Class: G&SWR: 540
- Power class: LMS: 5P
- Numbers: G&SWR 540–545; LMS: 15400–15405
- Withdrawn: 1935–1936
- Disposition: All scrapped

The Glasgow and South Western Railway 540 Class were 4-6-4T steam tank locomotives designed by Robert Whitelegg and built in 1922, shortly before the G&SWR was absorbed into the London, Midland and Scottish Railway (LMS). They were referred to in official G&SWR publicity as the Baltic Class, although they were also known more prosaically to enginemen as the 'Big Pugs'.

== Overview ==
The G&SWR had historically favoured small tender locomotives for almost all duties other than light shunting, and prior to the delivery of the Baltics its only passenger tank engines were 14 small 0-4-4Ts built for suburban services. However, Robert Whitelegg had previously served as Locomotive Superintendent of the London, Tilbury and Southend Railway which made almost exclusive use of tank engines on its heavy commuter traffic, and he brought this experience with him when he joined the G&SWR as Chief Mechanical Engineer in 1919. During his time at the LT&SR Whitelegg had designed the first 4-6-4T locomotives to operate in Great Britain; the LT&SR 2100 Class. Some of the G&SWR's passenger traffic resembled the LT&SR express services, so Whitelegg again opted for a 4-6-4T.

The new Baltics were built to a very high specification and were intended to represent the very best practice of their time, so they were very expensive to build. They were also easily the most powerful locomotives ever operated by the G&SWR, and the company made the most of their delivery for publicity purposes. In service the locomotives performed very well on express passenger trains between Glasgow St Enoch and the Ayrshire coast towns or Kilmarnock, however they were expensive to maintain.

== LMS ownership ==
Within a few months of delivery the locomotives passed into the ownership of the newly formed London, Midland and Scottish Railway, and their green G&SWR livery was replaced by LMS crimson lake. By the end of the 1920s they were being repainted into lined black.

The LMS drive for standardisation saw large numbers of new Fowler 2P and 4P Compound 4-4-0s delivered to the former G&SWR section, and in time these displaced the Baltic tanks from the top passenger services. There was little other work suitable for such large tank engines, and in any event as a non-standard class of only 6 engines they were doomed to be withdrawn once their boilers became due for renewal. The whole class was therefore withdrawn and scrapped between 1935 and 1937.

== Numbering and locomotive histories ==
Table of locomotives
G&SWR no.	LMS no.	Builder's no.	Delivered	Withdrawn
540	15400	NBL 22886	Mar 1922	Jan 1935
541	15401	NBL 22887	Mar 1922	Apr 1935
542	15402	NBL 22888	Mar 1922	Apr 1935
543	15403	NBL 22889	Apr 1922	Dec 1935
544	15404	NBL 22890	Apr 1922	Sep 1936
545	15405	NBL 22891	Apr 1922	Aug 1936
