= Type 24 =

Type 24 may refer to:

- Bristol Braemar Type 24, British heavy bomber aircraft
- Nieuport Type 24, French biplane fighter aircraft
- Peugeot Type 24, motor vehicle by the French auto-maker Peugeot
- Type 24 heavy machine gun, Chinese version of the MG 08
- Type 24 pillbox, a British WW II defence structure
- Type 24 rifle (Chiang Kai-shek rifle), Chinese version of the German Mauser Gewehr 98
- Type 24 torpedo boat, a class of torpedo boat built for the German Navy
- Type 24 Wheeled Armored Fighting Vehicle or Type 24 Mobile 120 mm Mortar, Japanese armored vehicles that are part of the common tactical wheeled vehicle family.

== See also ==
- Class 24 (disambiguation)
