= L&YR Barton Wright 0-6-2T =

British steam locomotive class (1877–1960s)

Type and origin
- Power type: Steam
- Designer: William Barton Wright
- Builder: Kitson; Dubs
- Build date: 1877–1883
- Total produced: 82 (Note: 18 were from rebuilds, 10 were new build good and 54 new build passenger)
- Number rebuilt: 18 (Note: Rebuilt from earlier 0-6-0 locomotives)
Specifications
- Configuration
  - Whyte: 0-6-2T
- Gauge: 4 ft 8 1/2 in (1,435 mm) standard gauge
- Driver dia.: 5 feet 1 inch (1.55 m) (Note: Passenger variant, the goods variant was 4ft 6in; the rebuilds may have been 4ft 10in)
- Axle load: 14 long tons 14 cwt (32,900 lb or 14.9 t)
- Loco weight: 52 long tons 4 cwt 2 qr (116,980 lb or 53.06 t)
- Boiler pressure: 140 psi (0.97 MPa)
Performance figures
- Tractive effort: 15,333 lbf (68.2 kN) (Note: Some fitted with newer boilers had a higher tractive effort)
- Details for passenger variant

The Lancashire and Yorkshire Railway (L&YR) Barton Wright 0-6-2T were tank engines introduced by Barton Wright between 1877 and 1883. This was the first use of the 0-6-2T type in Britain.

== Design and construction ==
Locomotive superintendent William Barton Wright began by rebuilding a Jenkins 0-6-0 tank with 4 feet 10 inches (1.47 m) wheels in 1877 with side tanks and a trailing Webb radial axle, this being the first example of this type in the Britain. Further conversions ensued and a total of 18 were rebuilt by 1883. Ten new locomotives, the first taking the number 141, were ordered from Kitson in 1880 with 4 feet 6 inches (1.37 m) driving wheels for freight traffic, these between designed to share components such as boilers, wheels, cylinders and motion as the existing 1876 0-6-0 engines. 14 of passenger variant of the design were supplied by Kitson in 1881 having 5 feet 1 inch (1.55 m) driving wheels and a 9 inches (0.23 m) longer total wheelbase. A further 40 were delivered from Dübs & Company between 1882 and 1883.

Ernest Ahrons noted that the purpose of the 0-6-2T design was to provide additional coal and water compared to a 0-6-0T. He dismisses the idea the design improves the curving properties of the locomotive, said this only applies when running bunker first. When running chimney first additional force is placed on the leading outward wheel flange. He notes that on routes with severe curves there have been cases where the 0-6-2T types have had to be replaced with locomotives with a 0-6-0T arrangement.

== Service ==
They were as being described as "probably the most useful type on the LYR in their day". They were noted for being capable of managing a train of 12 coaches of 12 tons up the 1 in 27 gradient to Oldham Werneth. Most were withdrawn in the early 1900s with a few lasting into LMS service in the late 1920s and early 1930s. One of the goods engines, No. 146 was fitted with a crane in 1924 and survived until 1931. About twenty of the passenger variety lasted into LMS service, with four surviving until 1932, and No. 247 with motion removed serving as a carriage warmer until the mid-1960s.

== Bibliography and further reading ==
- Ahrons, E.L. (1927). The British Steam Railway Locomotive 1825-1925. Amen Corner, London: Locomotive Publishing Co. OCLC 2329259. OL 6715902M.
- Lane, Barry C. (2010). Lancashire & Yorkshire Railway Locomotives. Pendragon. ISBN 9781899816170.
- Marshall, John (1972). The Lancashire & Yorkshire Railway, volume 3. Newton Abbot: David & Charles. ISBN 0-7153-5320-9.
