= L&YR Class 24 =

British steam locomotive class (1917–1961)

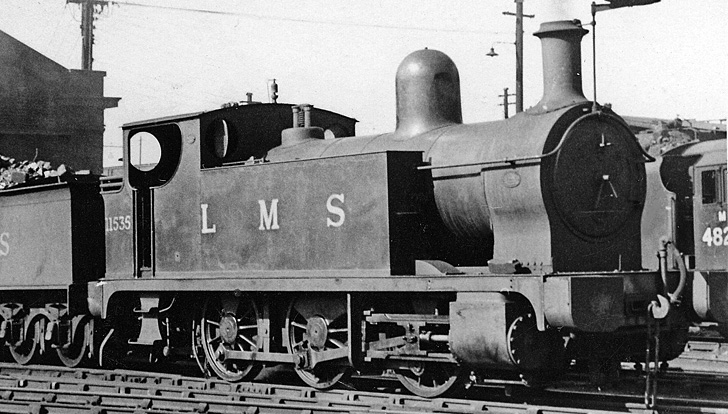
- No. 11535 with wooden dumb buffers at Bank Hall Locomotive Depot in 1948
Type and origin
- Power type: Steam
- Designer: Aspinall
- Build date: 1897
- Total produced: 20
- Rebuild date: 1917–1919
- Number rebuilt: 7
Specifications
- Configuration
  - Whyte: 0-6-0T
- Gauge: 4 ft 8 1/2 in (1,435 mm)
- Driver dia.: 4 ft 0 in (1.219 m)
- Loco weight: 50 long tons (51 t)
- Fuel type: Coal
- Boiler pressure: 160 psi (1.10 MPa)
- Cylinders: 2 outside
- Cylinder size: 17 in × 24 in (432 mm × 610 mm)
- Valve gear: Allan
Performance figures
- Tractive effort: 17,470 lbf (77.7 kN)
Career
- Operators: L&YR, LMS, BR
- Power class: LMS 2F
- Numbers: L&YR: 493–496, 499, 501, 503, 505–507, 1351–1360; LMS: 11533–11546 (with gaps); BR: 51535–51546 (with gaps)
- Nicknames: Rapid Shunters; Klondykes
- Locale: London Midland Region
- Withdrawn: 1914–1917, 1926–1936, 1954–1961
- Disposition: All scrapped

The L&YR Class 24 was a class of short-wheelbase 0-6-0T steam locomotives of the Lancashire and Yorkshire Railway (L&YR). It was designed by Aspinall and introduced in 1897 for shunting duties. Twenty locomotives were built, but six were withdrawn between 1917 and 1922. They were the first locomotives on the L&YR built with Belpaire fireboxes.

== Design and construction ==
They were designed for use in freight yards with sharp curves and steep inclines where more power was needed than that provided by alternative 0-4-0ST Aspinall Pugs.

This was the first time for a new build on the L&YR a Belpaire firebox was used. The short-wheelbase design included outside cylinders with Richardson balanced valves on top; these being controlled by a combination of Allan motion and rocking shaft. These locomotives – together with the Improved Precedent Class on the London and North Western Railway – were the last locomotives built with the Allan straight link motion.

=== Modifications ===
The steam reversing gear, helpful for faster shunting operations, was later replaced by a screw which negated this effect. The push and pull regulator handle seemed to have been responsible for a number of minor accidents through lack of fine control was also replaced by a standard type. Those working in the Liverpool docks area had bells fitted beneath the boiler.

Seven of the remaining engines were re-built with Barton Wright type round top boilers around the 1917–1919 period.

=== Fleet ===
Table of locomotives
L&YR no.	LMS no.	BR no.	Withdrawn
1351			1916 or earlier
1352	11533		1926
1353	11534		1928
1354			1914
1355	11535	51535	1956
1356	11536	51536	1954
1357			1917
1358	11537	51537	1961
1359	11538		1932
1360	11539		1926
493			1914
494	11540		1931
495	11541		1926
496	11542		1931
499	11543		1932
501	11544	51544	1959
503			1914
505	11545		1936
506	11546	51546	1959
507			1914

== Service ==
The class was allocated mostly to yards in the Liverpool area with Newton Heath and Agecroft depots receiving a number for use in their local larger marshalling yards. One based at Ormskirk was noted for performing on the main line between shunting duties.

Fourteen locomotives passed to the London, Midland and Scottish Railway at the grouping in 1923. After further withdrawals, 5 locomotives passed to British Railways (BR) in 1948 and they were numbered as shown in the table above. All had been withdrawn by 1961. None were preserved.

== See also ==
- LMS Fowler Dock Tank, a similar LMS design which also incorporated outside cylinders regarded as unusual practice for a dock tank

== Sources and further reading ==
- Ahrons, E.L. (1987) [1927]. The British Steam Railway Locomotive 1825-1925. London: Bracken Books. ISBN 1-85170-103-6.
- Casserley, H. C. & Johnston, Stuart W. (1966). Locomotives at the Grouping 3: London, Midland and Scottish Railway. Shepperton, Surrey: Ian Allan. ISBN 0-7110-0554-0.
- Lane, Barry C. (2010). Lancashire & Yorkshire Railway Locomotives. Pendragon. ISBN 9781899816170.
- Marshall, John (1972). The Lancashire & Yorkshire Railway, volume 3. Newton Abbot: David & Charles. ISBN 0-7153-5320-9.
