= L&YR 111 class =

British steam locomotive class (1877–1921)

LY&R Barton Wright 0-4-4 tank
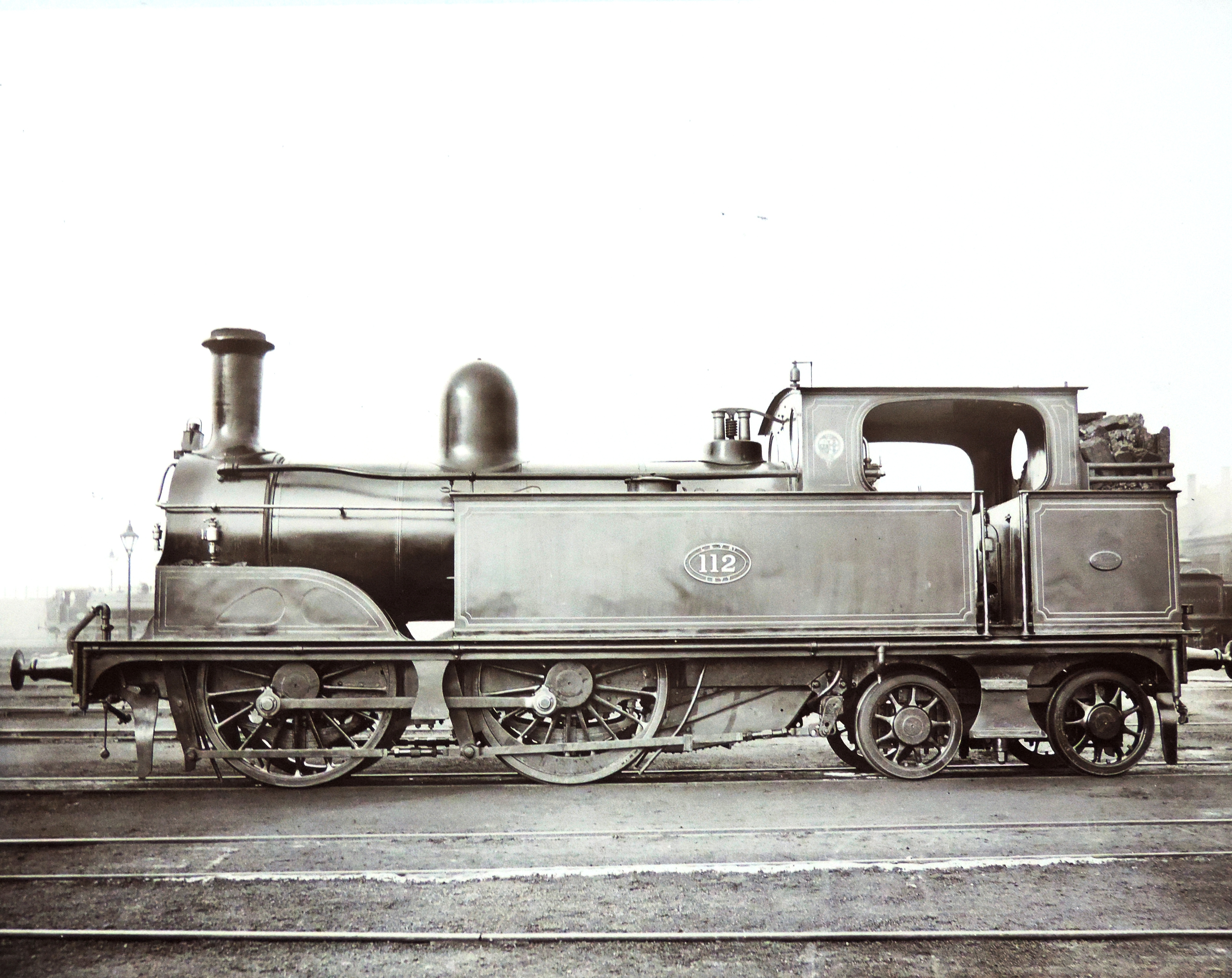
- L&YR 0-4-4T No. 112 with long side tanks
Type and origin
- Power type: Steam
- Designer: Kitsons / William Barton Wright
- Builder: Kitson & Co. (12); Dübs & Co. (10); Neilson & Co. (10); Sharp, Stewart & Co. (40)
- Build date: 1877–1886
- Total produced: 72
Specifications
- Configuration
  - Whyte: 0-4-4T
- Gauge: 4 ft 8 1/2 in (1,435 mm) standard gauge
- Driver dia.: 5 ft 8 in (1.727 m)
- Trailing dia.: 3 ft 1 1/2 in (0.953 m)
- Wheelbase
  - Axle spacing (Asymmetrical): 7 ft 7 in (2.31 m) +; 9 ft 10 in (3.00 m) +; 5 ft 6 in (1.68 m)
  - Engine: 22 ft 11 in (6.99 m)
- Loco weight: 49 long tons 12 cwt (111,100 lb or 50.4 t)
- Water cap.: 1,110 imp gal (5,000 L; 1,330 US gal) (Note: Kitson and Dübs engines with short tanks; Neilson engines had 900 imperial gallons (4,100 L; 1,100 US gal) tanks)
- Boiler
  - Diameter: 4 ft 2 in (1.27 m)
  - Tube plates: 10 ft 6 in (3.20 m)
- Boiler pressure: 140 psi (0.97 MPa)
- Heating surface: 1,057 sq ft (98.2 m^{2})
- Cylinders: Two, inside
- Cylinder size: 17 1/2 in × 26 in (444 mm × 660 mm)
Performance figures
- Tractive effort: 13,930 lbf (62.0 kN) (Note: Figure applies to later Sharp Stewart Locomotives)
Career
- Operators: Lancashire and Yorkshire Railway
- Numbers: See table
- Delivered: April 1877
- Withdrawn: 1901–1921
- Details for original Kitson batch except where noted.

The Lancashire and Yorkshire Railway (LY&R) Class 111 0-4-4T were designed by Kitson and Company for William Barton Wright, who had a requirement for a short-distance passenger tank locomotive.

== Design and construction ==
On his appointment in to the LY&R in 1875 Barton Wright inherited over 800 engines of more than 30 different types and many were insufficiently powerful for their required duties and resolved the L&YR would target achieving a minimum number of standard locomotive types with interchangeable components in order to meet future traffic needs. He addressed the most urgent needs for freight locomotives and higher end passenger locomotives first before addressing the requirement for a short-distance passenger locomotive in 1877. The 0-4-4T was essentially a Kitson design with 5 ft 8 in (1.73 m) coupled wheels, and Kitson delivered the first 12 locomotives between April 1877 and July 1878. The first pair, Nos. 111 & 112 had extended side tanks whose weight restricted the route availability of the engines so subsequent locomotives were delivered with shorter side tanks.

Subsequent batches were ordered from different manufactures and some included some detail variations. Ten came from Dübs & Co. from September 1878. Ten more from Neilson & Co. from August 1879 but had even smaller tanks and a water capacity of 900 imp gal (4,100 L; 1,100 US gal) and had a total working weight of 46 long tons 4 cwt (103,500 lb or 46.9 t). The final batch of 40 from Sharp, Stewart & Co. arrived between October 1885 and August 1886 with a working weight of 52 long tons 4 cwt (116,900 lb or 53 t).

The rear bogie, of an Adams type but with Timmis springs compressed to 30 long cwt (3,400 lb or 1,500 kg) replacing the indiarubber side check springs and the large indiarubber pad being omitted. It was said to give "steady running" at the rear of the locomotive.

Table of orders and numbers
Year	Manufacturer	Serial Nos.	L&Y numbers	Notes
1877	Kitson & Co.	2116–2117	111–112	Long side tanks
1878	Kitson & Co.	2216–2225	41, 43, 49, 604, 613, 628, 633–634, 636, 642	
1878	Dübs & Co.	1150–1159	55–56, 60–61, 67, 71, 74, 79, 83, 85	
1879	Neilson & Co.	2370–2379	86, 89, 93–94, 99, 109, 113, 115, 118, 665	
1885	Sharp, Stewart & Co.	3299–3308	906–915	
1885–86	Sharp, Stewart & Co.	3309–3318	916–925	Renumbered 2, 7, 17–18, 20, 28, 35, 517–519 in 1886
1886	Sharp, Stewart & Co.	3319–3338	14, 226, 616, 713, 614, 617, 625, 637, 3, 6, 8, 12, 19, 29, 480–481, 227, 230, 9, 221	

== Service ==
The original locomotives, Nos. 111 and 112 with long side tanks were found to be heavy and generally were allocated to pilot duties at Manchester Victoria. Others were initially allocated for expresses from Manchester to Leeds, Hellifield and Manchester before later being displayed by 4-4-0 tender locomotives to local services. Bulleid, in the biography The Aspinall Era the class is commended on "doing grand work".

== Sources and further reading ==
- Ahrons, E.L. (1927). The British Steam Railway Locomotive 1825-1925. Amen Corner, London: Locomotive Publishing Co.
- Baxter, Bertram (1982a). Baxter, David (ed.). British Locomotive Catalogue 1825–1923, Volume 3B: Lancashire and Yorkshire Railway and its constituent companies. Vol. 3B. Ashbourne, Derbyshire: Moorland Publishing Company. ISBN 0-903485-85-0.
- Bulleid, H.A.V. (1967). The Aspinall Era. Ian Allan Ltd.
- Lane, Barry C. (2010). Lancashire & Yorkshire Railway Locomotives. Pendragon. ISBN 9781899816170.
- Marshall, John (1972). The Lancashire & Yorkshire Railway, volume 3. Newton Abbot: David & Charles. ISBN 0-7153-5320-9.
