= L&YR Class 30 (Hughes compound) =

British steam locomotive class (1904–1927)

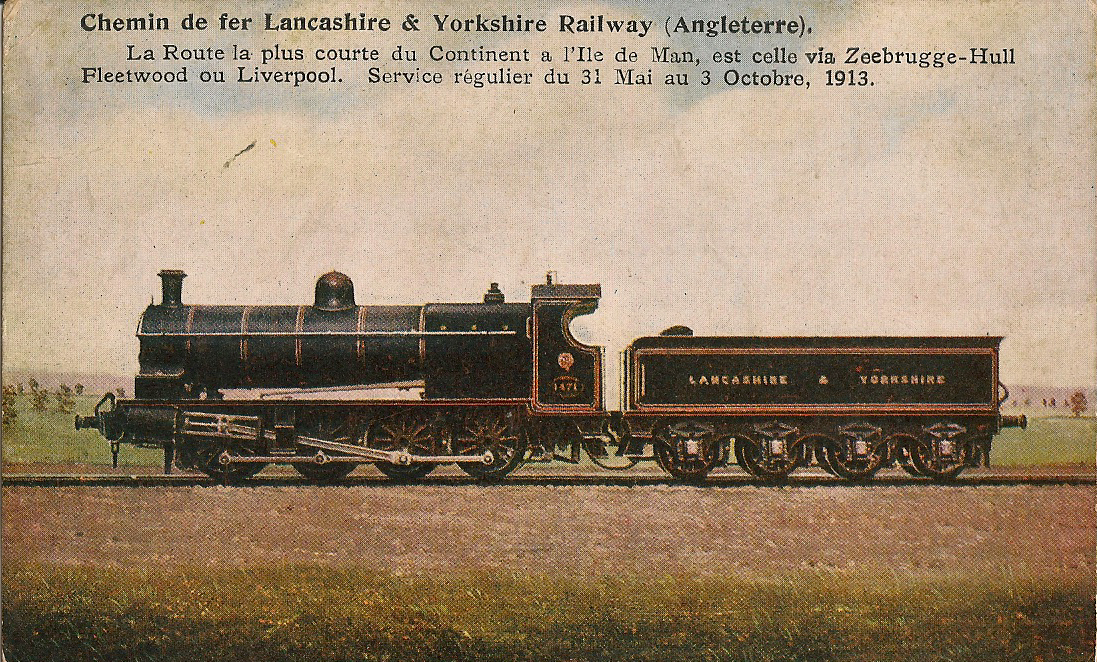
- Postcard depicting no. 1471
Type and origin
- Power type: Steam
- Designer: George Hughes
- Build date: 1904-1907
- Total produced: 1 rebuild, 10 new
Specifications
- Configuration
  - Whyte: 0-8-0
- Gauge: 4 ft 8 1/2 in (1,435 mm)
- Driver dia.: 4 ft 6 in (1.372 m)
- Loco weight: 60.8 long tons (61.8 t)
- Fuel type: Coal
- Boiler pressure: 180 psi (1.24 MPa)
- Cylinders: Four
- Cylinder size: 2 HP, 15.5 in × 26 in (394 mm × 660 mm); 2 LP, 22 in × 26 in (559 mm × 660 mm)
- Valve gear: Joy
Performance figures
- Tractive effort: 35,652 lbf (158.6 kN)
Career
- Operators: L&YR, LMS
- Power class: LMS 5F
- Withdrawn: 1926-1927
- Disposition: All scrapped

The L&YR Class 30 (Hughes compound) was a class of 0-8-0 steam locomotives of the Lancashire and Yorkshire Railway, designed by George Hughes. The prototype was rebuilt from an Aspinall Class 30 locomotive in 1904. Ten new locomotives were built in 1907. The locomotives passed to the London, Midland and Scottish Railway (LMS) in 1923.

== Design ==
These were four cylinder compound locomotives with two high pressure cylinders and two low pressure cylinders.

== Numbering ==
L&YR no.	LMS no.	Notes
1452	12760	rebuilt from Class 30 (simple expansion)
1471	(12761)	
1472	(12762)	
1473	(12763)	
1474	(12764)	
1475	12765	
1476	(12766)	
1477	12767	
1478	(12768)	
1479	(12769)	
1480	(12770)	

== Withdrawal ==
All were withdrawn and scrapped between 1926 and 1927. None were preserved.
