= William Hurst (civil engineer) =

Scottish civil engineer

William Hurst (1810–1890) was a Scottish civil engineer noted for his involvement in early railway construction in Britain.

== Life ==
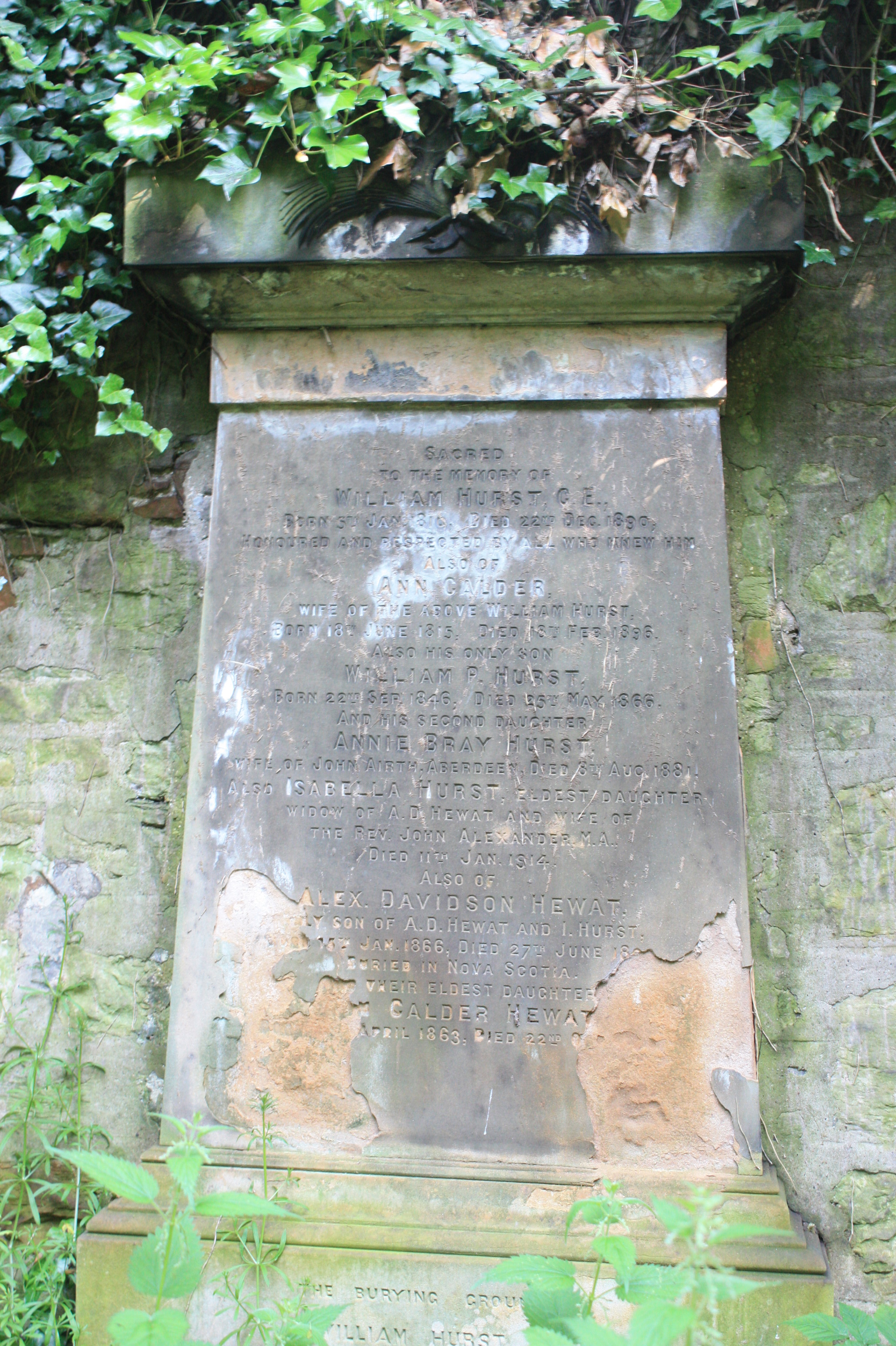
The grave of William Hurst, Warriston Cemetery, Edinburgh

He was born in Markinch in Fife on 5 January 1810. He served an apprenticeship as an engineer in Liverpool Docks from 1824. In 1845 he became the Railway Superintendent of the Manchester and Bolton Railway based at Salford. In 1846 the company was absorbed into the Manchester and Leeds Railway and then in 1847 became part of the Lancashire and Yorkshire Railway. In 1849 he moved from Salford to Miles Platting. Together with Richard Hodgson and Thomas Rowbotham they brought the new railway company to a high level of success.

In 1867 he became Locomotive Superintendent of the North British Railway. In this role he constructed 22 locomotives in Leith and a further two in Burntisland. Hurst at this time was earning £1200 per annum, more than twice the norm for engineers in the same role. In a scandal of 1867 Hurst and his two partners were forced to resign following the discovery that the company from whom the North British Railway hired their rolling stock (the Scottish Wagon Company) which was owned by the same three men. He returned to work in much lesser roles.

In retirement he lived at 17 Melville Terrace in Marchmont, Edinburgh.

He died in Edinburgh on 22 December 1890 and is buried in Warriston Cemetery in northern Edinburgh. The grave lies against the southern wall of the main cemetery, backing onto the Water of Leith Walkway.

== Family ==
He was married to Ann Calder (1815–1896) in June 1838 in Liverpool. They had one son, William P. Hurst (1846–1866) and two daughters, Annie and Isabella.
