= L&YR Class 30 (Hughes) =

British steam locomotive class (1910–1951)

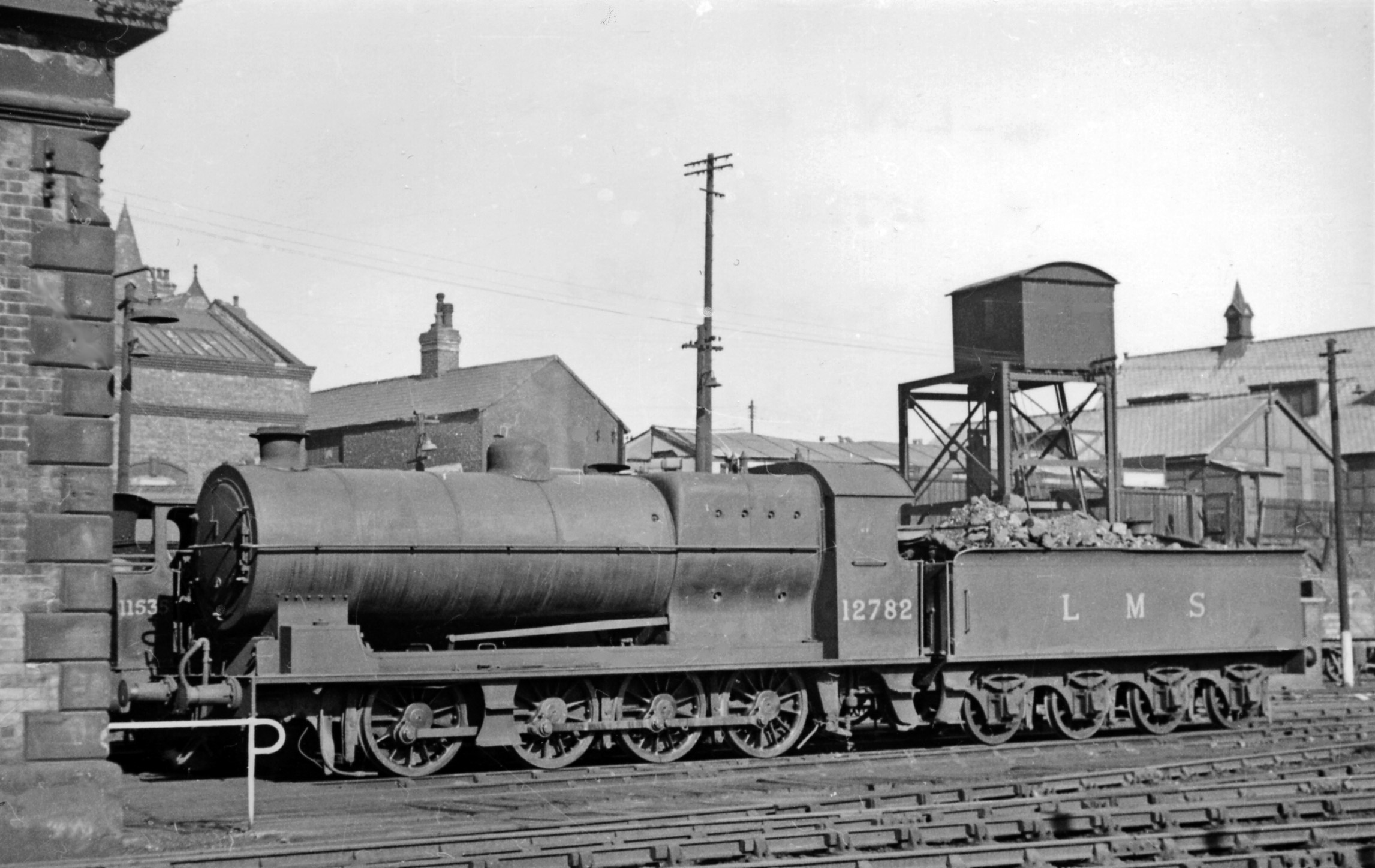
- No. 12782 at Bank Hall Locomotive Depot in 1948
Type and origin
- Power type: Steam
- Designer: George Hughes
- Build date: 1910-1918
- Total produced: 29 rebuilds, 40 new
Specifications
- Configuration
  - Whyte: 0-8-0
- Gauge: 4 ft 8 1/2 in (1,435 mm)
- Driver dia.: 4 ft 6 in (1.372 m)
- Loco weight: 64.2 long tons (65.2 t)
- Fuel type: Coal
- Boiler pressure: 180 psi (1.24 MPa)
- Cylinders: Two, inside
- Cylinder size: 20 in × 26 in (508 mm × 660 mm)
- Valve gear: Joy
Performance figures
- Tractive effort: 29,466 lbf (131.1 kN)
Career
- Operators: L&YR, LMS, BR
- Power class: LMS 6F
- Withdrawn: 1927-1951
- Disposition: All scrapped

The L&YR Class 30 (Hughes) was a class of 0-8-0 steam locomotives of the Lancashire and Yorkshire Railway. The class was designed by George Hughes and introduced in 1910. Twenty-nine were rebuilds from Aspinall's L&YR Class 30 and 40 were new locomotives.

== Numbering ==
A total of 69 locomotives was produced and these passed to the London, Midland and Scottish Railway (LMS) in 1923. The LMS gave them the power classification 6F and numbered them as follows:

- Rebuilds, 12771-12800
- New locos, 12801-12839

In 1948, British Railways (BR) inherited 11 locomotives and numbered them in the range 52782-52839.

== Withdrawal ==
The first locomotive was withdrawn in 1927 and the last in 1951. None were preserved.
