= L&YR Class 21 =

British steam locomotive class (1886–1964)

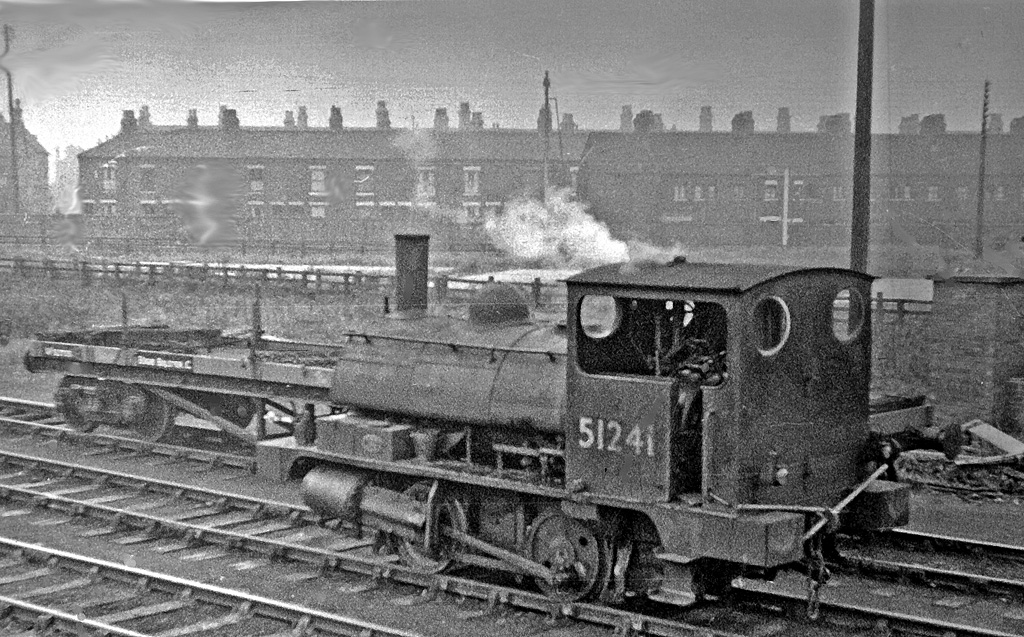
- L&YR 'Pug' 0-4-0ST at work in Goole Docks 1954
Type and origin
- Power type: Steam
- Designer: John Aspinall
- Builder: Vulcan Foundry (3); Horwich Works (57)
- Order number: Horwich Lots 10, 20, 26, 46, 52, 65
- Serial number: VF: 1176–1178; H: 811–20; 921–30, 1092–1111
- Build date: 1886, (3) 1891–1910 (57)
- Total produced: 60
Specifications
- Configuration
  - Whyte: 0-4-0ST
  - UIC: B n2t
- Gauge: 4 ft 8 1/2 in (1,435 mm) standard gauge
- Driver dia.: 3 ft 0 in (0.914 m)
- Wheelbase: Vulcan: 6 ft 0 in (1.829 m); Horwich: 5 ft 9 in (1.753 m)
- Loco weight: 21.25 long tons (21.59 t; 23.80 short tons)
- Fuel type: Coal
- Boiler pressure: Vulcan: 140 lbf/in^{2} (0.97 MPa); Horwich: 160 lbf/in^{2} (1.10 MPa)
- Heating surface: 475.75 sq ft (44.199 m^{2})
- Cylinders: Two, outside
- Cylinder size: 13 in × 18 in (330 mm × 457 mm)
Performance figures
- Tractive effort: 10,060–11,490 lbf (44.7–51.1 kN)
Career
- Operators: Lancashire and Yorkshire Railway; → London, Midland and Scottish Railway; → British Railways
- Class: L&YR: 21
- Power class: LMS: 0F
- Number in class: 1 January 1923: 58; 1 January 1948: 23
- Numbers: LMS: 11200–11257
- Locale: London Midland Region
- Retired: 1910, 1924-1938, 1956–1964
- Disposition: Two preserved, remainder scrapped

The L&YR Class 21 is a class of small 0-4-0ST steam locomotive built by the Lancashire and Yorkshire Railway for shunting duties. They were nicknamed Pugs.

== Construction history ==
The class originates in the purchase of three saddle tank locomotives ordered from Vulcan Foundry in 1886. They were fitted with an 8-foot-10-inch (2.69 m) long, 3-foot-0-inch (914 mm) diameter boiler with a pressure of 140 lbf/in^{2} (965 kPa) powering two outside 13-by-18-inch (330 mm × 457 mm) cylinders connected to 3-foot-0-inch (914 mm) driving wheels. The wheelbase was 6 ft 0 in (1.83 m) and the total heating surface of the saturated boiler was 475.75 sq ft (44.20 m^{2}).

J. A. F. Aspinall then ordered more locomotives of a modified design: the wheelbase was shortened to 5 ft 9 in (1.75 m), the tank was extended over the smokebox, the cab was enlarged, and the boiler pressure raised to 160 lbf/in^{2} (1,103 kPa). Seventeen of this modified design were ordered from Horwich Works in three batches; Aspinall's successor Henry Hoy order another batch of 10; and Hoy's successor George Hughes ordered 30 more in two batches.

Table of orders and numbers
Lot No.	Qty	Manufacturer	Serial Nos.	Year	L&Y Nos.	LMS Nos.
—	3	Vulcan Foundry	1176–1178	1886	916–918	11200, —, —
10	6	Horwich Works	(none)	1891	1153–1156, 32, 310	11201–11206
20	6	Horwich Works	(none)	1893–94	504, 654, 729, 1230–1232	11207–11212
26	5	Horwich Works	(none)	1895	1286–1290	11213–11217
46	10	Horwich Works	811–820	1901	68, 113, 139, 155, 377, 389, 399, 402, 403, 476	11218–11227
52	10	Horwich Works	921–930	1905–06	260, 813, 814, 821, 823, 825, 832, 840, 865, 879	11228–11237
65	20	Horwich Works	1092–1111	1910	2, 3, 8, 12, 17, 19, 28, 43, 56, 64, 71, 75, 118, 226, 271, 298, 481, 517, 613, 614	11238–11257

The last locomotive was delivered in July 1910, four months before the first retirement; 917 and 918 were withdrawn in November that year, but were not scrapped until November 1912.

== Operational history ==
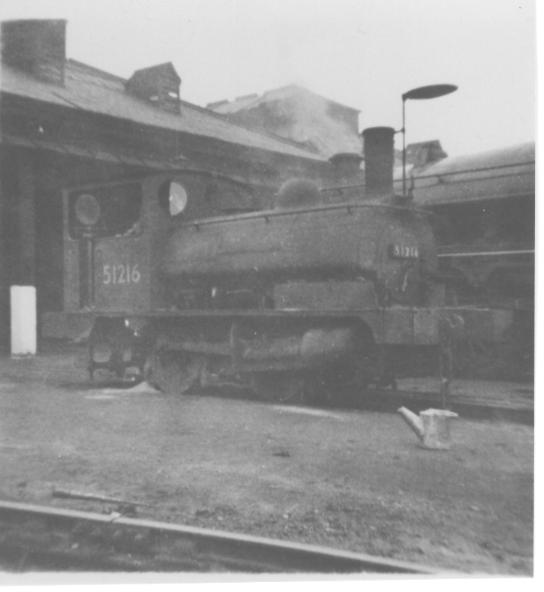
L&YR 0-4-0ST Pug 51216 at Bank Hall MPD in 1951. Note the smoke deflector over the chimney for operation beneath the Liverpool Overhead Railway, under which the dock lines often ran

The London, Midland and Scottish Railway (LMS) gave the locomotives the power classification 0F. In total sixty were made between 1886 and 1910. They were built for use in sharply curved sidings for shunting duties. The Pugs were allocated by the L&YR for operation in the industrial areas and docks of Fleetwood, Goole, Liverpool and Salford. In later times they became more widely dispersed, reaching places such as Bristol, Bangor, Crewe, Derby, Widnes, York and Swansea. When the LMS was merged into British Railways on 1 January 1948, 23 'Pugs' remained in service; BR added 40,000 to their fleet numbers.

== Withdrawal ==
Withdrawals started in 1910 with two going in that year. Four went in the 1920s, 31 in the 1930s; leaving 23 to be withdrawn between 1957 and 1964.

Table of withdrawals
Year	Quantity in service at start of year	Quantity withdrawn	Locomotive numbers	Notes
1910	60	2	917–918	
1924	58	1	11220	to service stock, scrapped 1930
1925	57	1	916	LMS number not applied
1926	56	2	1153, 654	LMS numbers not applied
1930	54	4	11210/14/19/42	
1931	50	10	11203/09/26/33/38/43/47–48/52	11238 in service stock since 1924; 11243 sold to Mowlem & Co. Bassett, then to United Glass Bottle Manufacturers Prince, then to preservation
1932	40	4	11211/25/28/30	11225 sold to J. F. Wake
1933	36	3	11223/45/51	11245 in service stock since 1931, sold to North Wales Granite Co.; 11251 sold to Frazer & Co.
1934	33	5	11213/24/36/55–56	11224 sold to A. R. Adams; 11255 sold to J. F. Wake
1935	28	2	11205/39	
1936	26	1	11249	sold to Cooke & Nuttall
1937	25	1	11257	sold to Holloway Brothers
1938	24	1	11215	
1956	23	1	51216	
1957	22	3	51212/34/40	11234 in service stock between 1924 and 1933
1958	19	3	51202/30/35	
1959	16	1	51231	
1960	15	2	51221/27	
1961	13	3	51217/29/46	
1962	10	6	51204/06–07/22/41/44	
1963	4	3	51232/37/53	11253 stored between 1924 and 1928
1964	1	1	51218	Preserved

== Accidents and incidents ==
- On 5 July 1963, one of the driving wheels of locomotive No. 51232 sheared off at Salford, Lancashire.

== Preservation ==
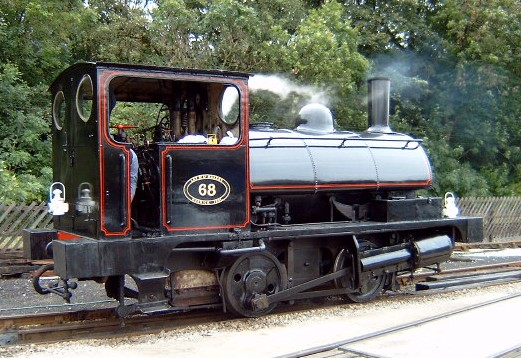
68 in 2004.

Two "Pugs" have survived into preservation, both through the Lancashire and Yorkshire Railway Trust. L&YR No. 19 (LMS No. 11243), built in 1910, was sold by the LMS into industry in 1931 and was acquired by the Trust from the United Glass Bottle Manufacturers Ltd. at Charlton in 1967. It was found to be in poor mechanical condition and was later placed on static display pending overhaul, most recently at the Ribble Steam Railway. In early 2020 the locomotive moved to the East Lancashire Railway in Bury. Following an inspection of its condition, it was decided to proceed with restoring it to working order. This restoration was completed in 2022 and in 2023 has been reliveried as LMS 11243.

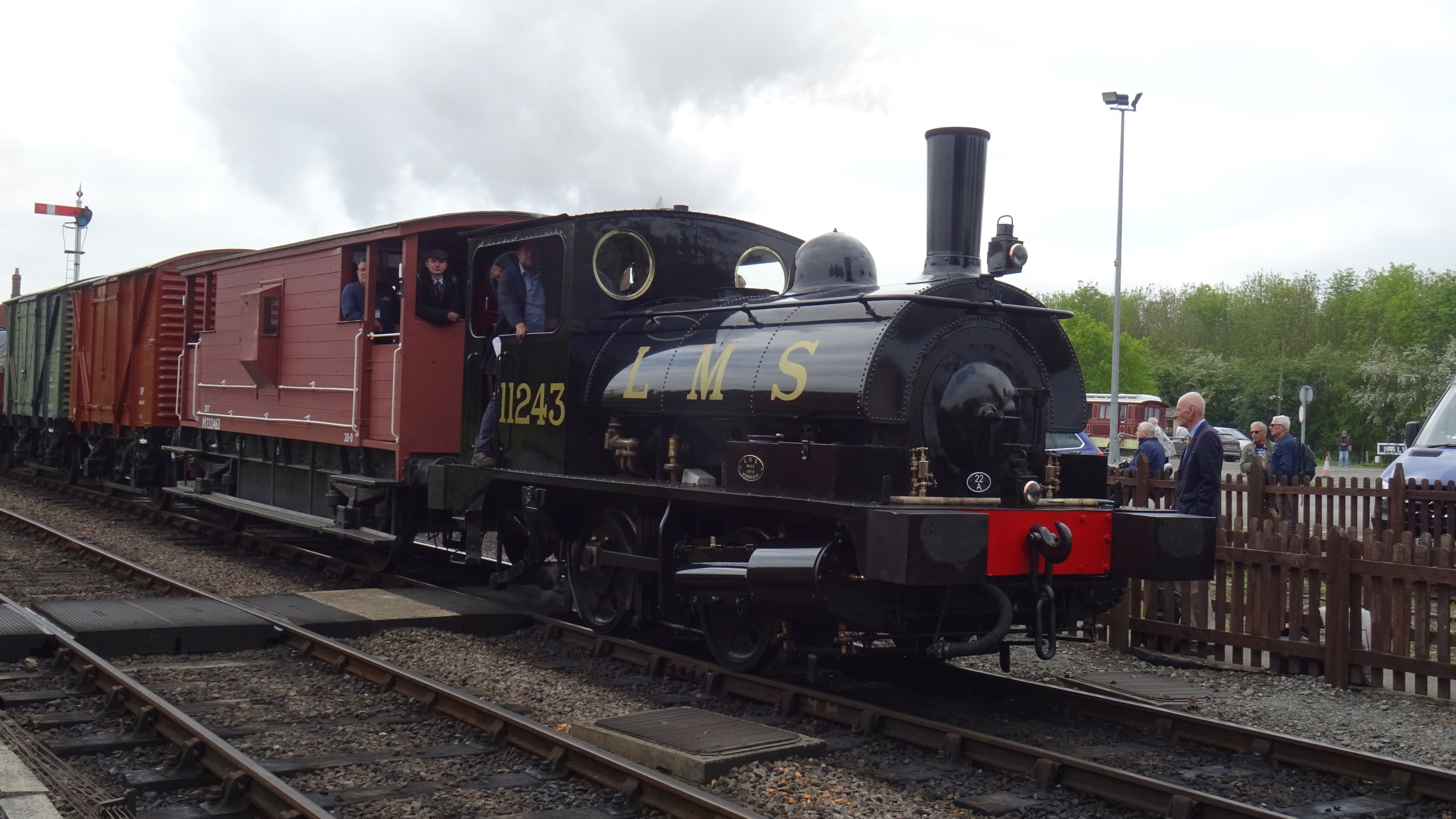
19 (LMS 11243) in 2023.

L&YR No. 68 (LMS No. 11218, BR No. 51218), built in 1901, was purchased directly from British Rail in 1964 and moved to the Keighley and Worth Valley Railway in January 1965. The locomotive was re-tubed in 1974 and took part in the Stockton & Darlington Railway cavalcade that year. The locomotive was overhauled again in 1997 and continued in service, albeit mostly as a shunting locomotive due to its low power, until its boiler tubes required replacement in 2006. The locomotive carried its original identity of L&YR 68 from 2004 onwards, but has been cosmetically restored in 2018 to 51218 for the K&WVR's 50th Anniversary Gala, reflecting that 51218 was the first loco to arrive in 1965. Overhaul is now under consideration at Haworth on the K&WVR as the restoration of 0-6-0ST No. 752 has now been completed at the East Lancashire Railway.

== Models ==
Several models of the 'Pug' have been produced commercially.

The first was a 'OO'-scale polystyrene kit made in the 1960s by Kitmaster, the moulds for which were subsequently sold to Airfix then passed on to Dapol, which still manufactures the former Airfix plastic kit range. This kit has often been used as the basis for a narrow-gauge 'pug bash' locomotive running on 00-9 tracks.

A ready-to-run OO model was introduced by Dapol in 1984 and then Hornby where the Pug was produced until 2000. The Pug was reintroduced to Hornby's range in 2010 (R2927) in early British Railways Livery. It was also made in 2019 in the LMS livery.

Larger scale models are available from a number of suppliers including Tower Models of Blackpool.

== See also ==
- Pug (steam locomotive)
