= NBR G Class =

Class of British steam locomotives

NBR G Class LNER Class Y9
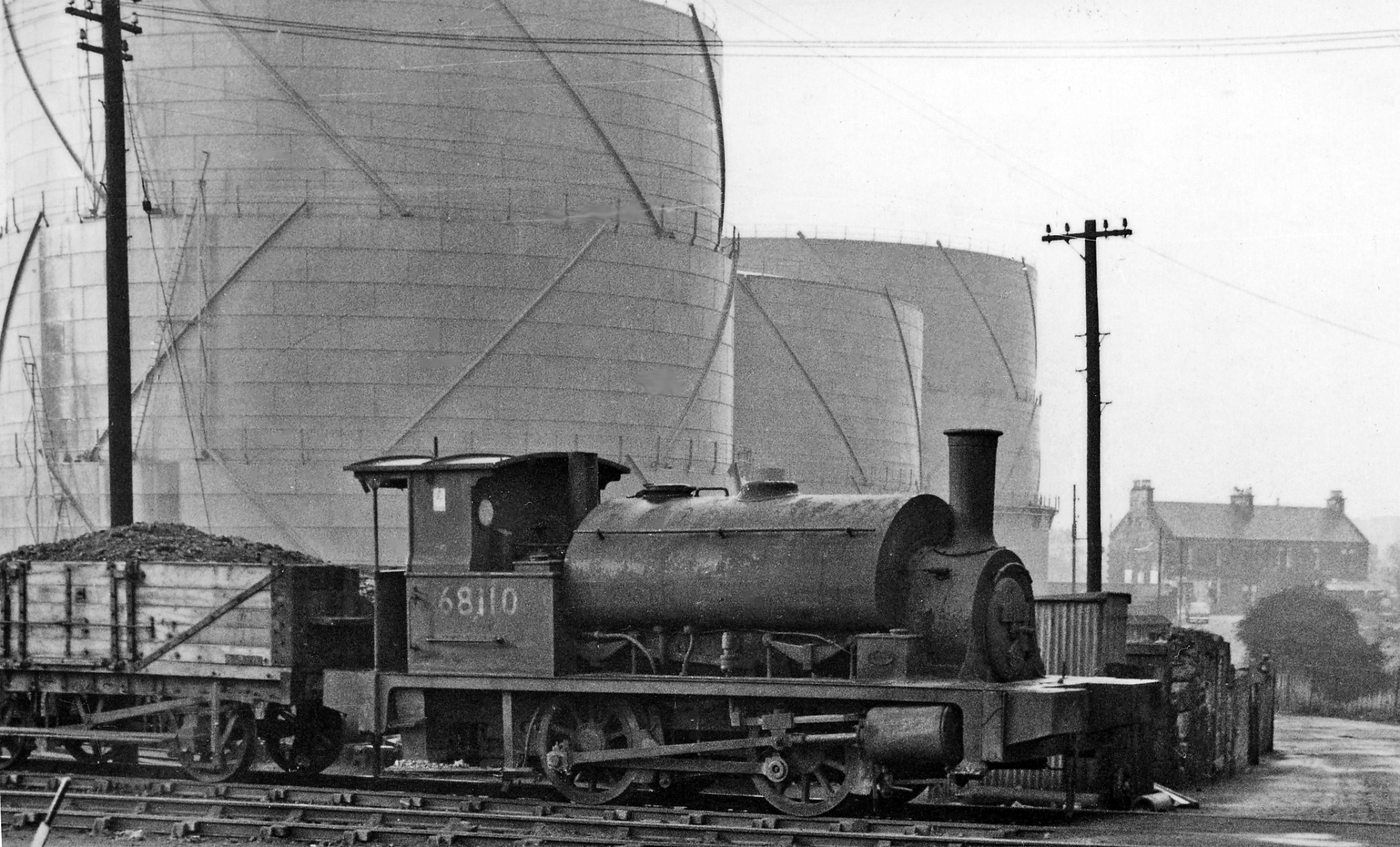
- Class Y9 68110 at Kipps Shed in 1961
Type and origin
- Power type: Steam
- Designer: Neilson and Company
- Builder: Neilson & Co (first 2); NBR (remaining 36)
- Build date: 1882-1899
- Total produced: 38 for NBR (Many others were built for other companies.)
Specifications
- Configuration
  - Whyte: 0-4-0ST
- Gauge: 4 ft 8 1/2 in (1,435 mm) standard gauge
- Driver dia.: 3 ft 8 in (1.118 m)
- Loco weight: 27.8 long tons (28.2 t; 31.1 short tons)
- Tender weight: 6 long tons (6.1 t; 6.7 short tons)
- Fuel type: Coal
- Boiler pressure: 130 psi (0.90 MPa)
- Cylinders: 2, outside
- Cylinder size: 14 in × 20 in (356 mm × 508 mm)
Performance figures
- Tractive effort: 9,845 lbf (43.79 kN)
Career
- Operators: NBR » LNER » BR; Same type also operated by other companies.
- Power class: 0F
- Nicknames: Pug
- Withdrawn: 1953-1962
- Disposition: One preserved, remainder scrapped.

The North British Railway (NBR) G Class (LNER Class Y9) is a class of 0-4-0ST steam locomotive designed for shunting. Some locomotives were equipped with small wooden tenders to carry extra coal. They were introduced in 1882 and thirty-eight entered service on the NBR between 1882 and 1899. Like most 0-4-0 tanks of the period it has outside cylinders and inside slide valves driven by Stephenson valve gear. The rival Caledonian Railway had the same number (38) of identical locomotives in service. The nickname "Pug" was used on the NBR. (The Caledonian Railway, in common with several other companies, used this nickname for all small shunting engines.)

== Origin ==
The basic industrial shunting locomotive design was originated by Neilson and Company of Hyde Park Works, Springburn, Glasgow, who built the first examples of the type, mainly for industrial customers, in the 1870s. One such, built in 1876, is in the collection of the Scottish Railway Preservation Society at Bo'ness. The locomotives were designed to operate at low speed, shunting heavy loads, on tight radius sidings and points.

Major railway companies often required engines of this type for duties such as yard and dock shunting, and the design was taken up by the North British Railway and the Caledonian Railway amongst others. Having trailed a small number of locomotives built by Neilson & Co, each railway company was permitted to build further examples itself under licence, while attributing the design to their own respective Chief Mechanical Engineers, Dugald Drummond (CR) and Matthew Holmes (NBR).

== Pre-grouping ownership ==
=== Caledonian Railway ===
In 1876 the Caledonian Railway bought four locomotives of this design from Neilsons. Between 1885 and 1908, the Caledonian Railway built thirty-four more examples at the company's own St. Rollox railway works in Glasgow.

=== North British Railway ===
In much the same way, the North British Railway (NBR) bought two locomotives from Neilson in 1882, and by 1899 they had built thirty-six for themselves at their Cowlairs railway works in Glasgow, giving a total of thirty-eight engines in service. Having obtained license to replicate the design, each of the railway companies incorporated minor detail modifications into their version. On the NBR the locomotives were designated G class when the new class identification system was introduced in 1913.

=== Great Eastern Railway ===
The Great Eastern Railway Class 209 is similar but has a flat-topped saddle tank. One example is preserved, formerly at the North Woolwich Old Station Museum, and is currently being restored at Lydney, Gloucestershire.

== LNER and BR ownership ==
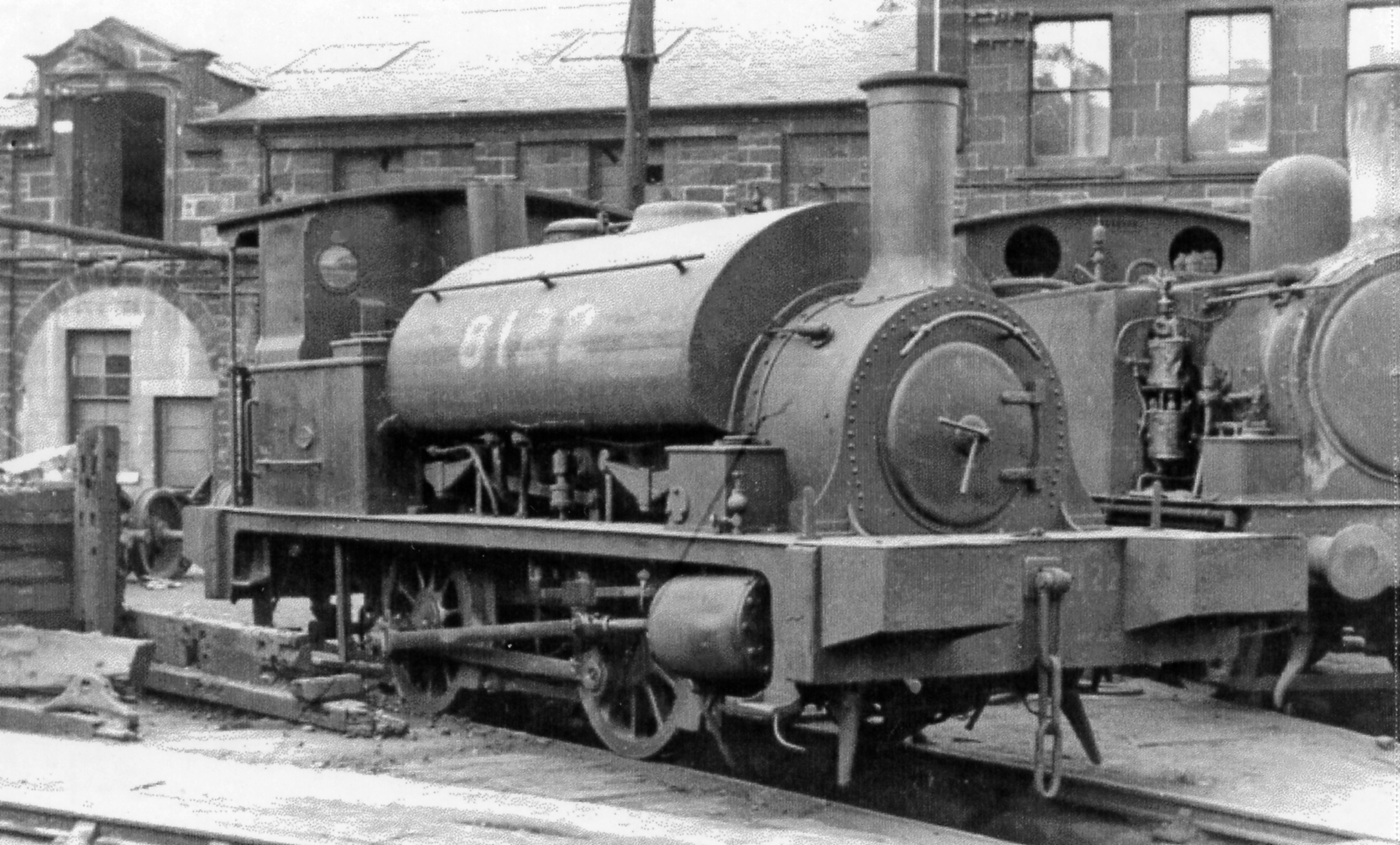
No. 8122 (later 68122) at St Margaret's Locomotive Depot, Edinburgh, 13 August 1948

The LNER acquired most of the NBR examples in 1923 and classified them Y9. Thirty-three of them passed into British Railways ownership in 1948 and were numbered 68092–68124.

== Preservation ==
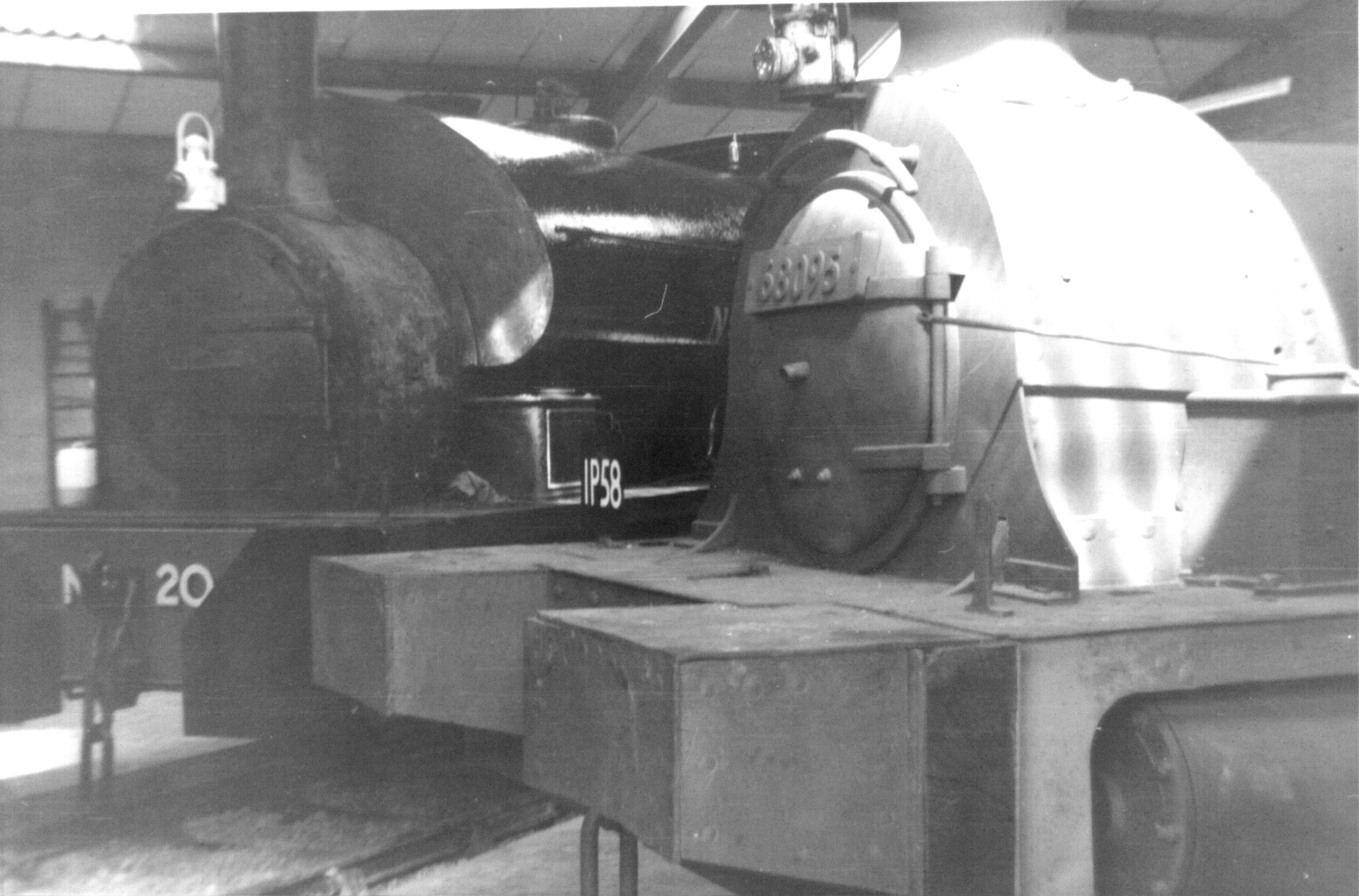
NB 0-4-0ST 18386 'No 20' & NBR Y9 0-4-0ST No 42 (1887) BR 68095

One, NBR No. 42 (BR 68095), has survived to preservation in the Scottish Railway Preservation Society collection and is a static exhibit. This was bought from British Railways straight out of traffic at St Margaret's Shed, Edinburgh by J.Morris, and was displayed at his former museum at Lytham St Annes until it was bought by SRPS in 1992.

An example of the original design by Neilson & Co. is also preserved by the Scottish Railway Preservation Society. It was built in 1876 and named Kelton Fell.

== Sources ==
- Ian Allan ABC of British Railways Locomotives, part 4 (1948 ed.). p. 46.
