= List of Talyllyn Railway rolling stock =

Video showing all steam and diesel locomotives departing Tywyn Wharf

This is a list of past and present rolling stock used on the Talyllyn Railway (Welsh: Rheilffordd Talyllyn), a 2 ft 3 in (686 mm) narrow gauge preserved railway line running for 7.25 miles (11.67 km) from Tywyn on the Mid-Wales coast to Nant Gwernol near the village of Abergynolwyn. The line was opened in 1866 to carry slate from the quarries at Bryn Eglwys to Tywyn, and was the first narrow gauge railway in Britain authorised by Act of Parliament to carry passengers using steam haulage. Despite severe under-investment, the line remained open, and in 1951 it became the first railway in the world to be preserved as a heritage railway by volunteers.

When first opened, the railway owned two steam locomotives, Talyllyn and Dolgoch, and five carriages, including one brake van. There were no additions to the rolling stock until the line was taken over in 1951. (Note: During the 1910s, Henry Haydn Jones, the owner of the railway, requested estimates for a new locomotive for the railway. However, no purchase was made.) Two ex-Corris Railway locomotives were then purchased from British Railways, and subsequent additions have brought the total up to six steam locomotives, four diesels and twenty-three carriages. As of 2023, Boston Lodge Works is constructing three bogie carriages, one composite with disabled access and two third class, numbered No. 24 to 26. The first of these, No. 24, was delivered to the railway in August 2023.

== Locomotives ==
The railway has six steam locomotives for passenger trains and four diesel locomotives that usually haul only works trains. (Note: The railway also intends to build a new battery-electric locomotive using parts from two locomotives it owns. As this is not yet operational, it is not included in this list.) It is unusual for all steam locomotives to be operable at one time, as there is usually at least one locomotive undergoing an overhaul. In the early days of preservation Rev. W Awdry, the author of the Railway Series books, visited the railway on a family holiday and became involved as a volunteer soon afterwards. He, and later his son Christopher, wrote the Talyllyn Railway into the books as the Skarloey Railway, and most locomotives on the Talyllyn have a fictional counterpart in that series. These are listed in the right hand column.

=== Steam locomotives ===
| Number | Name | Image | Wheel Arrangement | Builder | Works number | Date built | Current status (as of 2025) | Railway Series equivalent |
|---|---|---|---|---|---|---|---|---|
| 1 | Talyllyn | Talyllyn at Tywyn Wharf | 0-4-2ST | Fletcher, Jennings & Co., Whitehaven | 42 | 1864 | In service | Skarloey |
| 1 | Talyllyn | Talyllyn at Tywyn Wharf | One of two original locomotives, it was built as an 0-4-0ST without a cab. By 1867, trailing wheels had been added to improve stability, and it had a cab installed at the same time. | | | | | |
| 2 | Dolgoch | Dolgoch at Tywyn Wharf | 0-4-0WT | Fletcher, Jennings & Co., Whitehaven | 63 | 1866 | In service | Rheneas |
| 2 | Dolgoch | Dolgoch at Tywyn Wharf | The second original locomotive. Like Talyllyn, it was built without a cab, though one was subsequently added. It was named after the intermediate station and local waterfalls, though after the Boer War, it carried the name Pretoria for several years. In 2011 it received a new boiler, and returned to steam in time for the 60th anniversary celebrations of the preservation society on 14 May. | | | | | |
| 3 | Sir Haydn | Sir Haydn at Abergynolywn | 0-4-2ST | Hughes, Falcon Works, Loughborough | 323 | 1878 | In service | Sir Handel |
| 3 | Sir Haydn | Sir Haydn at Abergynolywn | An ex-Corris Railway locomotive, purchased in 1951 and subsequently named after Sir Henry Haydn Jones, owner of the railway prior to preservation. Following the expiry of its 10-year boiler ticket in early 2012, the loco was stored out of use at the Corris Railway until April 2013, when it commenced a tour of various railway sites in England to help raise funds for its overhaul. In February 2015 it was moved back to the Talyllyn. In Autumn 2015 it was sent to the Vale of Rheidol Railway's new workshop in Aberystwyth for its overhaul to start. It returned to service in 2018, in time for its 140th birthday. | | | | | |
| 4 | Edward Thomas | Edward Thomas at Tywyn Wharf | 0-4-2ST | Kerr Stuart, Stoke-on-Trent | 4047 | 1921 | In service | Peter Sam |
| 4 | Edward Thomas | Edward Thomas at Tywyn Wharf | The second ex-Corris Railway locomotive, also purchased in 1951 and subsequently named after the general manager of the line prior to preservation. It was fitted with a Giesl ejector between 1958 and 1969. Received a new boiler in 2004. | | | | | |
| 6 | Douglas | Douglas at Tywyn Wharf | 0-4-0WT | Andrew Barclay, Kilmarnock | 1431 | 1918 | Awaiting overhaul | Duncan |
| 6 | Douglas | Douglas at Tywyn Wharf | A "Modified E Class", built for the depot railway serving RAF Calshot. It was donated to the Talyllyn in 1953, re-gauged from 2 ft (610 mm) gauge and named after Douglas Abelson, who donated the locomotive. Returned to service July 2013 as 'Douglas' in bright red and black border livery. Repainted to RAF blue livery in March 2018. | | | | | |
| 7 | Tom Rolt | Tom Rolt at Tywyn Wharf | 0-4-2T | Talyllyn Railway, Pendre | none given | 1991 (Note: This refers to the year the locomotive was built by the Talyllyn. The Bord na Móna locomotive used for some of the constituent parts was built in 1949.) | In service | Ivo Hugh |
| 7 | Tom Rolt | Tom Rolt at Tywyn Wharf | This locomotive was built by the Talyllyn Railway using components from a Bord na Móna (Irish Peat Board) Andrew Barclay locomotive. It was originally intended to give it the jocular name Irish Pete. However, prior to completion, it was decided to name it in honour of L.T.C. Rolt, one of the founders of the Talyllyn Railway Preservation Society. Returned to service in 2020 following a ten-yearly overhaul. | | | | | |

=== Diesel locomotives ===
| Number | Name | Image | Type | Builder | Date built | Power (hp) | Wheel diameter | Railway Series equivalent |
|---|---|---|---|---|---|---|---|---|
| 5 | Midlander | Midlander at Pendre | 4wDM | Ruston & Hornsby | 1941 | 48 | 1 ft 6 in (0.46 m) | Rusty |
| 5 | Midlander | Midlander at Pendre | This locomotive was purchased in 1957 from Jee's quarries at Hartshill, and contains parts that were cannibalised off an identical locomotive. It was named after the Midlands area group of the preservation society that donated the locomotive. | | | | | |
| 9 | Alf | Alf at Pendre | 0-4-0DM | Hunslet Engine Co. | 1950 | 75 | 2 ft (0.61 m) | Fred |
| 9 | Alf | Alf at Pendre | This is an ex-National Coal Board locomotive, from Huncoat Colliery in Lancashire. It was named after Alf Robens, chairman of the National Coal Board. | | | | | |
| 11 | Trecwn | Trecwn at Nant Gwernol | 4wDH | Baguley | 1983–84 | 99 | 2 ft (0.61 m) | |
| 11 | Trecwn | Trecwn at Nant Gwernol | One of three Baguley diesels that were purchased from RNAD Trecwn in South Wales in 2008. The third diesel is used for spares. These were originally bought by a consortium of volunteers, but have since been purchased from this group by the railway. They were re-gauged from 2 ft 6 in (762 mm) to the Talyllyn's 2 ft 3 in (686 mm) gauge. This loco was originally numbered T 0006 00 NZ 32 (BD 3764) and entered service on the Talyllyn in 2014. | | | | | |
| 12 | St. Cadfan | St. Cadfan at Wharf | 4wDH | Baguley | 1983–84 | 99 | 2 ft (0.61 m) | |
| 12 | St. Cadfan | St. Cadfan at Wharf | The second of the three Baguley diesels that were purchased from RNAD Trecwn in South Wales in 2008. (Note: The third loco, formerly T 0009 00 NZ 35 (BD 3781), will not operate on the railway, but is being used for spares.) This loco was originally numbered BD 3779 and named after St Cadfan's Church in Tywyn. | | | | | |

=== Self-propelled engineering vehicles ===
| Name | Image | Type | Builder | Date built |
|---|---|---|---|---|
| Toby | Permanent Way Trolley | Permanent Way Trolley | John Bate | 1954 |
| Toby | Permanent Way Trolley | Small trolley used by engineers for transportation to worksites. Built from a second hand Austin 7 engine and gearbox, mounted on a custom-made chassis. It was damaged in a shunting accident in 2008 and taken out of service, but returned to use in 2019. | | |
| – | Flail mower | Flail Mower | Talyllyn Railway | 1998 |
| – | Flail mower | Rail mounted self-propelled vehicle used to clear lineside vegetation. Designed by John Bate (Chief Engineer 1963–1994) and built from chassis components from two Ruston & Hornsby locomotives, the framing and motor components of a Smalley excavator, the flail mechanism and cab from a McConnel flail mower and a new Perkins diesel power unit. | | |
| Idris | | 4w Track Tamper | Matisa | 2021 |
| Idris | | Rail mounted track tamper bought by the railway in 2021, but suffered issues with the loading gauge that needed to be rectified before re-entering service. A seat and toolbox were also added during the overhaul. | | |

=== Former locomotives and engineering vehicles ===
| Number | Name (Note: Names in inverted commas refer to unofficial nick-names, not formally applied.) | Image | Type | Builder | Date built | Power (hp) | Year with- drawn |
|---|---|---|---|---|---|---|---|
| 5 | "The Lawnmower" | | 4wPH | David Curwen | 1952 | 20 | 1953 |
| 5 | "The Lawnmower" | | This lightweight locomotive was built by member David Curwen using a Ford Model T engine and transmission from L.T.C Rolt's narrowboat and the wheels from a Talyllyn Railway slate wagon. It worked the Fridays-only winter passenger service until 1953, when it was taken out of use with a failed gearbox. It was dismantled in 1954, and converted to flat wagon No. 19 (see below). It is proposed to rebuild it as a memorial to David Curwen, using a replacement engine and bodywork. | | | | |
| 7 | "Charlie's Ant" (Note: One source uses the spelling "Charley's Ant".) | | 4-2-0 | Talyllyn Railway | 1954 | | c.1958 |
| 7 | "Charlie's Ant" | | A Mercury tractor that had been adapted to push standard gauge rolling stock by the addition of a buffer beam. It was further adapted in 1954 for use on the Talyllyn, and later converted to run on paraffin instead of petrol. It was little used after 1958 and later scrapped. It was nicknamed after Charles Uren, the railway's chief engineer. | | | | |
| 8 | Merseysider | Merseysider at Nant Gwernol | 4wDH | Ruston & Hornsby | 1964 | 50 | 2016 |
| 8 | Merseysider | Merseysider at Nant Gwernol | This was originally built using parts from three 3 ft (914 mm) gauge locomotives from Park Gate steelworks in Rotherham, acquired in 1969. The superstructure was replaced c. 2000. It has a Dowty hydrostatic transmission. The name was chosen by the donor of the locomotive. This locomotive was sold in 2016 to an enthusiast. | | | | |
| 10 | Bryn Eglwys | Bryn Eglwys at Wharf | 4wDH | Motor Rail | 1985 | 110 | 2014 |
| 10 | Bryn Eglwys | Bryn Eglwys at Wharf | This was originally a 2 ft 6 in (762 mm) gauge National Coal Board locomotive from Hem Heath colliery near Stoke-on-Trent. It arrived on the Talyllyn September 1997, and was re-painted into standard Talyllyn livery during summer 2005. The locomotive was named after the Bryn Eglwys slate quarries. The loco was sold to the North Gloucestershire Railway, and left the railway in August 2014 when the first Baguley loco entered service. | | | | |
| – | – | Matisa ballast tamper | 4w Track Tamper | Matisa | 1990 | | 2021 |
| – | – | Matisa ballast tamper | Rail mounted track tamper. Built from parts of two ex-MOD standard gauge tampers that were acquired in 1989. It was designed and assembled by John Bate, and commissioned on 26 June 1990. In 2021 it was sold when a new tamper was purchased. | | | | |

=== Visiting locomotives ===
As of 2024 there have only been four visiting locomotives capable of running on the Talyllyn Railway's unusual gauge. These are Motor Rail Simplex diesel No. 5 Alan Meaden, Winson Engineering No. 7 a Tattoo class similar to the Talyllyn's No. 4, battery-electric Clayton shunter No. 9 Aberllefenni and Corris Railway No. 10, a new build Falcon similar to the Talyllyn's No. 3. All these locomotives are from the Corris Railway.

In July 2015 a gala was held to mark the railway's 150th anniversary, and two 1 ft 11 1/2 in (597 mm) gauge locomotives visited the railway: George England and Co. locomotive Prince from the Ffestiniog Railway and Hunslet Engine Company Russell from the Welsh Highland Heritage Railway, both in Porthmadog. Two lengths of temporary track were laid at Tywyn Wharf to allow the locomotives to operate over a short distance.

In July 2016, another gala was held, with three visiting locos, all built by Fletcher, Jennings and Co. Together with Talyllyn and Dolgoch, this was an assembly of all five surviving locos in the UK built by this firm. As with the previous gala, temporary track was laid due to the differing gauges. One of the locomotives, Captain Baxter, ran on a short section of standard gauge track. The other two Fletcher Jennings locomotives, William Finlay and Townsend Hook, were static exhibits only and are therefore not listed below. William Finlay remained at Tywyn after the event and is now on display at the Narrow Gauge Railway Museum.

In September 2021, to mark the centenary of No. 4, Corris Railway No. 7 made another visit to the Talyllyn, along with the other preserved Kerr Stuart Tattoo class, Stanhope, and Sirdar class Diana. Stanhope and Diana ran on temporary 2 ft (610 mm) track laid at Wharf station, and No. 7 pulled several trains along the full length of the line.

| Number | Name | Image | Type | Builder | Date built |
|---|---|---|---|---|---|
| 5 | Alan Meaden | Alan Meaden on the Corris Railway | 4wDM | Motor Rail Simplex | 1965 |
| 5 | Alan Meaden | Alan Meaden on the Corris Railway | A former 2 ft (610 mm) gauge diesel from Staveley Lime Products, Hindlow, Derbyshire, named in honour of the Corris Society's founder. It visited the Talyllyn in 1983 and 1990. | | |
| 7 | (unnamed) | Corris No. 7 | 0-4-2ST | Winson Engineering and Drayton Designs | 2005 |
| 7 | (unnamed) | Corris No. 7 | Built for the Corris Railway, based on the Kerr Stuart "Tattoo" class design of Corris No. 4. It visited the Talyllyn in 2011 and 2021. | | |
| 2 | Prince | Prince | 0-4-0TT (Note: TT denotes a tank locomotive with additional tender.) | George England and Co. | 1864 (Note: Some sources state that Prince was built in 1863.) |
| 2 | Prince | Prince | Prince was built in 1863 or 1864 for the Ffestiniog Railway and is the oldest FR locomotive still in operating condition. It has spent all of its working life on the FR, but in 2015 ran on a short length of 1 ft 11 1/2 in (597 mm) gauge track laid at Tywyn Wharf station as part of the TR's 150th anniversary celebrations. | | |
| (unnumbered) | Russell | Russell | 2-6-2T | Hunslet Engine Co. | 1906 |
| (unnumbered) | Russell | Russell | Built in 1906 for the NWNGR, Russell later ran on the Welsh Highland Railway. After the WHR closed in 1937 it moved to the Brymbo Ironworks railway and then in 1946 to Fayle's Tramway in Dorset. It was rescued for preservation in 1954 and between 1955 and 1965, Russell was on display as a static exhibit outside the Narrow Gauge Railway Museum at Tywyn. Since 1965 the locomotive has belonged the WHHR. It visited Tywyn again in 2015 as part of the TR's 150th anniversary celebrations. | | |
| 3 | Captain Baxter | Captain Baxter | 0-4-0T | Fletcher, Jennings and Co. | 1877 |
| 3 | Captain Baxter | Captain Baxter | A standard gauge locomotive, built in 1877 for the Betchworth Quarry Railways in Surrey. It is preserved by the Bluebell Railway in West Sussex. | | |
| 2395 | Stanhope | Stanhope | 0-4-2ST | Kerr, Stuart and Co. | 1917 |
| 2395 | Stanhope | Stanhope | A 2 ft (610 mm) locomotive, built for the Penrhyn Quarry Railway. It is preserved by the Apedale Valley Light Railway in Staffordshire. | | |
| 1135 | Diana | Diana | 0-4-2ST | Kerr, Stuart and Co. | 1917 |
| 1135 | Diana | Diana | A 2 ft (610 mm) locomotive, formerly on the Kerry Tramway. It is preserved by the Amerton Railway in Staffordshire. | | |
| 9 | Aberllefenni | Aberllefenni | 4wBE | Clayton Equipment Company | 1974 |
| 9 | Aberllefenni | Aberllefenni | A four-wheeled battery-electric locomotive from Aberllefenni quarry and now owned by the Corris Railway. It visited the Talyllyn in September 2023 as part of a heritage weekend. | | |
| 10 | (unnamed) | | 0-4-2ST | Alan Keef Ltd and Corris Railway | 2022 |
| 10 | (unnamed) | | Built for the Corris Railway, based on the Hughes Falcon Works class design of Corris No. 3. It visited the Talyllyn in 2024. | | |

== Carriages ==
The Talyllyn railway has a total of 23 carriages, with two more under construction as of 2024. The first five are the original carriages built for the railway, though they were not provided with numbers until preservation in 1951. After that time, the remaining carriages were built by the railway or acquired from elsewhere. With the exception of ex-Corris carriage No. 17, all the bogie coaches were built for the railway after preservation; the smaller four wheeled coaches are generally older.

All the stock is third class only, unless otherwise stated. Where two figures are given for the number of seats, the larger figure is the maximum number of passengers than can be carried in a heavily loaded train.

=== Four wheeled carriages ===
| Number | Image | Builder | Date built | Seats | Notes |
|---|---|---|---|---|---|
| 1 | Carriage No. 1 | Brown, Marshalls | 1866 | 18 | This was originally a first class carriage; it is now third class. It is 14 feet 6 inches (4.42 m) long, 12 inches (300 mm) longer than the original carriage to allow for extra legroom. Carriages 1 to 3 were all built with doors on both sides, though the doors on the south side of the line are all permanently locked shut with no handles as the platforms are all on the north side. |
| 2 | Carriage No. 2 | Brown, Marshalls | 1866 | 18 | This carriage is identical to carriage number 1, but has always been third class only. Basic cushion seats were added after the railway was preserved. |
| 3 | Carriage No. 3 | Brown, Marshalls | 1866 | 18 | This was the first carriage to be delivered, and is 1 foot (30 cm) shorter than Nos. 1 and 2. Originally third class, it was later changed to composite (first and third class), but is now third class again. In 2026, it was twinned with Vintage Trains' Pullman coach Eagle, built in 1960 by the Metropolitan Carriage & Wagon Company. Both carriages were built in Birmingham. |
| 4 | Carriage No. 4 | Lancaster Carriage and Wagon Works | by 1867 | 18 | In the 1950s, this carriage was known as "Limping Lulu" to railway staff due to the poor state of the frames, which were replaced in 1958. |
| 5 | Brake van No. 5 | Brown, Marshalls | 1866 | none | This was the original guard's van. It was out of use between 1946 and April 1949 while its wheels were repaired at the Britannia Foundry in Porthmadog. |
| 6 | Brake van No. 6 | Falcon Works | 1885 | none | This guard's van was originally from the Corris Railway. |
| 7 | Carriage No. 7 | Believed de Winton. Rebuilt by the Talyllyn Railway. | c. 1900 | 13 | This was ex-Penrhyn Quarry Railway open carriage 'H'. It operated on the Talyllyn until 1961, and was later used as a tea van at Abergynolwyn, then as a generator wagon. During 1985 and 1986 it was completely rebuilt as a wheelchair saloon with guards compartment. |
| 8 | Carriage No. 8 | Talyllyn Railway | 1966 | 24 | This was originally Penrhyn Quarry Railway open carriage 'P', which operated on the Talyllyn from 1952 until 1964. The bodywork was condemned and scrapped, and a new semi-open coach built in 1966. |
| 11 | Carriage No. 11 | Penrhyn Quarry Railway. Converted by the Talyllyn Railway. | Unknown. Converted in 1955. | 24 | This is a semi-open carriage, originally Penrhyn Quarry Railway open carriage 'D', which was converted by the Talyllyn in 1955. It was rebuilt as a semi-open coach with a roof and doors in 1959. |
| 13 | Carriage No. 13 | Talyllyn Railway | 1957 | 24 | Open sided. |
| 14 | Carriage No. 14 | Midland R.C.&W. | 1892 | 12 | First class. Ex-Glyn Valley Tramway. |
| 15 | Carriage No. 15 | Midland R.C.&W. | 1902 | 12 | First class. Ex-Glyn Valley Tramway. |

=== Bogie carriages ===
| Number | Image | Builder | Date built | Seats | Notes |
|---|---|---|---|---|---|
| 9 | Carriage No. 9 | W.G. Allen & Tisdales | 1954 | 30/40 | |
| 10 | Carriage No. 10 | W.G. Allen & Tisdales | 1954 | 18/24 | Contains guards compartment. |
| 16 | Carriage No. 16 | Kerr Stuart & TR | 1961 | 18/24 | Originally an open coach. Contains guards compartment. |
| 17 | Carriage No. 17 | Metropolitan C.&W. | 1898 | 22 | Ex-Corris Railway No. 8 and GWR No. 4992. Served as a greenhouse/summerhouse in Gobowen from 1930 to 1958 before being restored by the Talyllyn Railway. |
| 18 | Carriage No. 18 | Talyllyn Railway | 1965 | 36/48 | |
| 19 | Carriage No. 19 | Talyllyn Railway & Tisdales | 1969 | 12 1st class, 24/32 3rd class | Composite carriage |
| 20 | Carriage No. 20 | Talyllyn Railway & Tisdales | 1970 | 32/41 | Wheelchair saloon. |
| 21 | Carriage No. 21 | Talyllyn Railway & Tisdales | 1971 | 32/41 | Wheelchair saloon. Rebuilt in 2012 and returned to service in July 2013. |
| 22 | Carriage No. 22 | Talyllyn Railway & Tisdales | 1972 | 24/32 | Contains guards compartment. |
| 23 | Carriage No. 23 | Talyllyn Railway & Tisdales | 1975 | 36/48 | |
| 24 | Carriage No. 24 | Boston Lodge | 2023 | 12 1st class, 21/25 3rd class | |
| 25 | | Boston Lodge | 2024 | | |

=== Former carriages ===
| Number | Image | Builder | Date built | Seats | Notes |
|---|---|---|---|---|---|
| 12 | Carriage No. 12 | Talyllyn Railway | 1956 | 24 | This was a semi-open four wheeled carriage, originally Penrhyn Quarry Railway open carriage 'C', which was converted by the Talyllyn in 1956. It was rebuilt as a semi-open coach with a roof and doors in 1958. In 2019 the body was scrapped, and the frames converted to a flat wagon. |

== Goods wagons ==
The Talyllyn Railway was primarily constructed for conveying slate. Prior to the beginning of the 20th century, the railway owned over 115 wagons, mainly slate wagons, but also a number of other general and special purpose goods wagons. Some of these survived into the preservation era, and since then a large number of additional wagons have been purchased and built. The following table lists the main types of wagon currently in use:

| Number | Image | Body type | Origin | Notes |
|---|---|---|---|---|
| 1 | Corris open wagon | No. 1 Open end door | Corris Railway | A 2 long tons (2.0 metric tons) coal wagon, acquired in 1951 from the Corris Railway. |
| 4 | Talyllyn wagon No 4 | No. 1 Open side door | Corris Railway | A 1 long ton (1.0 metric ton) coal wagon, acquired in 1951 from the Corris Railway. |
| 5, 8, 11, 13, 15, 17 | Wagon No. 17 | No. 2 Open end door | Talyllyn Railway | |
| 6, 7, 9 | Wagon No. 9 | Underframe only | Talyllyn Railway | |
| 16 | | Gunpowder Van | Talyllyn Railway | Replica of the original gunpowder van, built by the Talyllyn's Young Members Group in 2025 |
| 19 | | Flat wagon | | This was converted from the original locomotive No. 5. |
| 20, 21, 22, 23, 24 | Hopper wagons | Ballast hopper | Winchburgh Shale Oilworks | Four of the five hoppers were acquired from Winchburgh in 1961; the fifth was built by the Talyllyn in 1983. |
| 28 | MoD covered wagon | No. 1 Covered van | Ministry of Defence | Acquired from Trecwn Royal Naval Armaments Depot in 2007. |
| 29 | Tool van | Tool van | | |
| 30, 31, 33 | | Bolster wagon | Ffestiniog Railway | Open frame wagons used in pairs to carry timber. |
| 32, 34, 35 | | Flat wagon | Ffestiniog Railway | 3 long tons (3.0 metric tons) wagon, acquired in 1956, regauged from 1 ft 11 1/2 in (597 mm) gauge. |
| 36 | | No. 1 Flat wagon with crane | Bowaters Railway | Acquired in 1971 and known as the Boflat. This was fitted with a crane in January 2009. |
| 37 | MoD flat wagon with crane | No. 2 Flat wagon with crane | Bowaters Railway | |
| 40, 41, 42, 43, 50, 52, 53, 54, 55 | Tipper wagon | Tipper wagon | Cefn Coch quarry | A set of 2 ft 6 in (762 mm) gauge wagons obtained in 1975. |
| 60, 61, 62 | MoD flat wagon | Flat wagon | Ministry of Defence | |
| 70 | Bogie brake van | Bogie brake van | Ministry of Defence | Known as Boadicea, and repainted into green livery in January 2013. |
| 71, 72 | | Bogie flat wagon | Ministry of Defence | |
| 73 | | Ballast wagon | Vale of Rheidol Railway | Arrived on 7 May 2024. |
| 101, 136, 164 | Slate wagon | Slate wagons | Talyllyn Railway | Three 2-bar and one 3-bar wooden slate wagons, owned by the Narrow Gauge Railway Museum. |
| 117 | Incline wagon | Incline open | Talyllyn Railway | Original general purpose wagon, built with sheet iron sides and designed to prevent spillages while hauled on the Abergynolwyn village incline, owned by the Narrow Gauge Railway Museum. |
| 146 | Covered van | No. 2 Covered van | Talyllyn Railway | Original van, owned by the Narrow Gauge Railway Museum. |
| N | | Mail Waggon (Note: The Corris Railway used the alternative spelling of waggon for its rolling stock, and this has been applied here.) | Corris Railway | Owned by the Narrow Gauge Railway Museum. |

== Narrow Gauge Railway Museum rolling stock ==
The Narrow Gauge Railway Museum is a purpose-built museum dedicated to narrow gauge railways situated on the Tywyn Wharf station. It owns several wagons formerly in use on the railway (listed above), as well as rolling stock and other artefacts from other narrow gauge railways around the world. The wagons are still used occasionally on the Talyllyn.

== Liveries ==
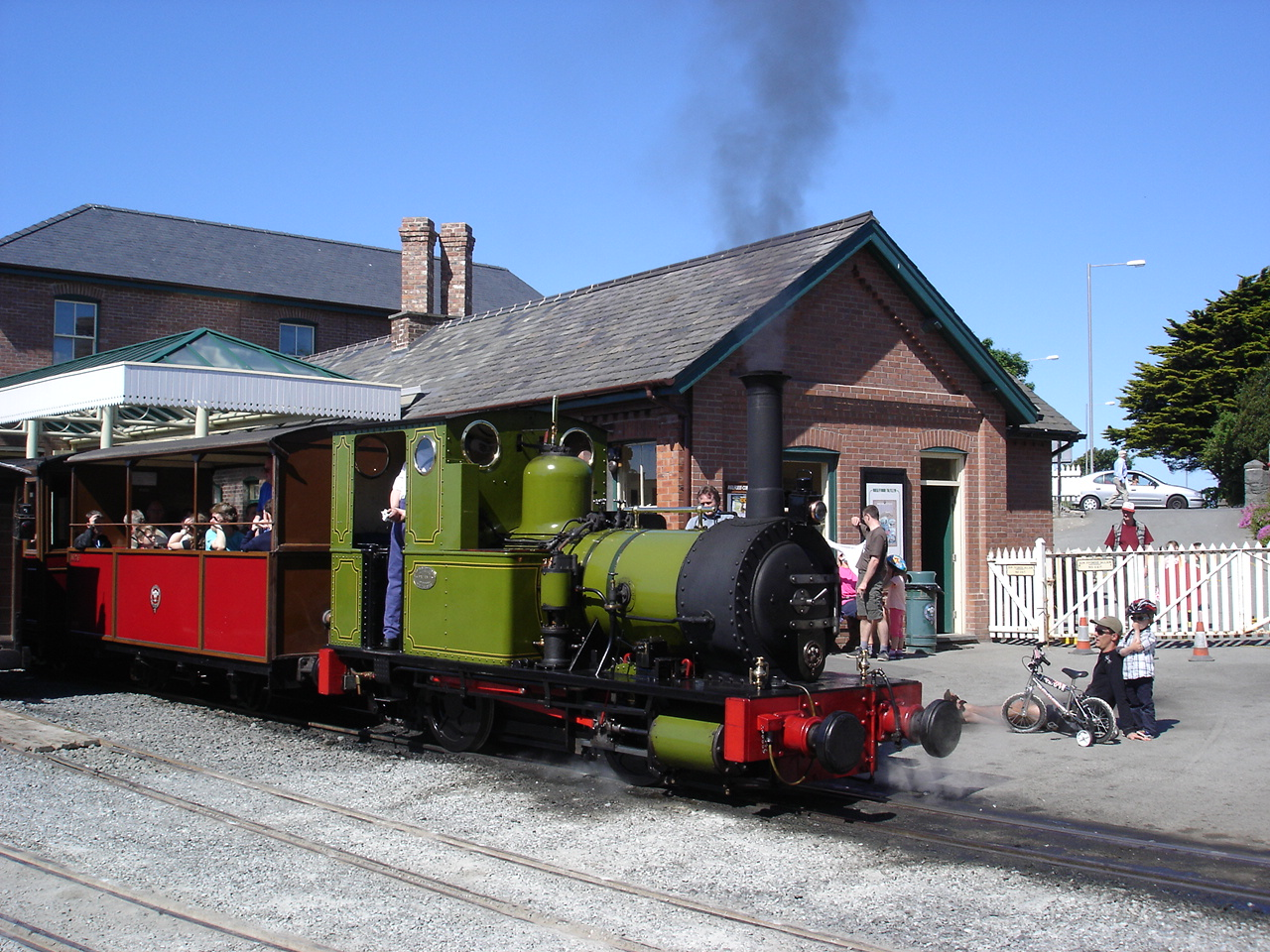
Tal-y-Llyn Railway No. 2 Dolgoch in Atlas green

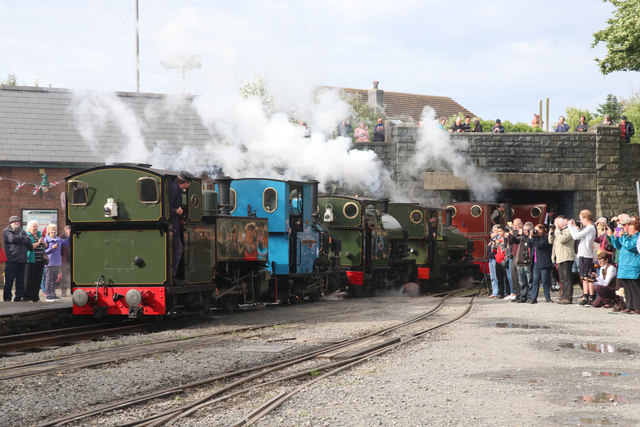
Talyllyn Railway steam engine cavalcade

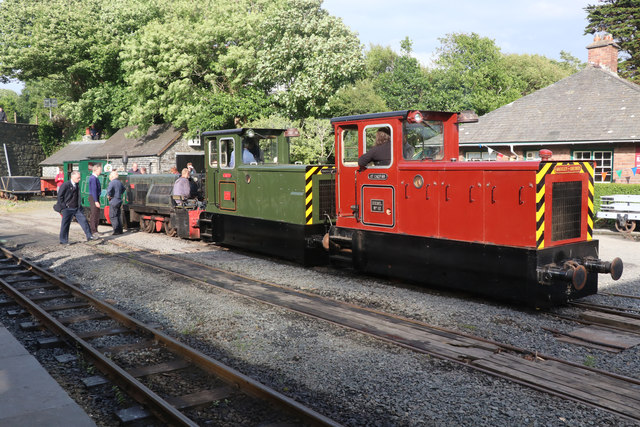
Talyllyn Railway diesel cavalcade

The standard livery for locomotives on the Talyllyn is deep bronze green, lined in black and yellow, although since the 1980s there has been a policy of varying some of the liveries for a period of time. Previously, No. 1 and No. 2 carried lined black and TR Crimson red liveries respectively. No. 2 Dolgoch had for a time carried Atlas green livery in preservation. No. 3 and No. 4 have carried Corris Railway Indian Red during certain times in Preservation. No. 4 had also carried Great Western Railway Middle Chrome Green, as well unlined British Railways black.

The liveries carried by the steam locomotives as of 2023 are as follows:-

- No. 1: Royal blue of the Great Eastern Railway.
- No. 2: Standard Talyllyn green with standard lining. Burnished motion and black background to builders/name/number plates.
- No. 3: 'Skarloey Railway' inspired red with blue lining. Name painted in yellow on the saddle tanks.
- No. 4: Kerr, Stuart lined grey.
- No. 6: RAF blue.
- No. 7: Standard Talyllyn green with standard lining. Burnished motion and black background to builders/name/number plates.

In addition to this, No.5 Midlander spent much of its time painted dark green; this has now been changed to black with silver and purple lining to allow for the locomotive to run in the guise of Rusty the Narrow Gauge Diesel from The Railway Series on Thomas themed events.

No.11 is in deep bronze green with BR lining and wasp stripes on the ends.

No.12 is in Indian Red with wasp stripes on the ends.

The coaches built for the line after preservation are alpha red and Talyllyn Brown, lined with deep bronze green. Coaches 1, 2, and 3 are in cherry red and Talyllyn Brown, with blue and deep bronze green lining. Coach 4 and Van 5 are in alpha red and Talyllyn Brown with deep bronze green lining. Additionally, the railway has preserved rolling stock from other railways. These retain their original liveries.

The Corris coach (Talyllyn No. 17) and brake van (Talyllyn No. 6) are brown lined with gold leaf and the two Glyn Valley Tramway coaches (Talyllyn Nos. 14 and 15) are green and cream.

== Bibliography ==
- Bate, John (2001). The Chronicles of Pendre Sidings. RailRomances. ISBN 1-900622-05-X.
- Bate, John; Mitchell, David; Adams, Nigel (2003). Narrow Gauge Railways in Profile No. 1: Talyllyn Railway Locomotives & Rolling Stock. Cheona Publications. ISBN 1-900298-21-X.
- Boyd, James I.C. (1970). Narrow Gauge Railways in Mid Wales (2nd ed.). Oakwood Press. ISBN 0-85361-024-X.
- Boyd, James I.C. (1988). The Tal-y-llyn Railway. Wild Swan Publications Ltd. ISBN 0-906867-46-0.
- Cox, David (1983). Welsh Narrow Gauge in the 1980s. Battenhall Books. ISBN 0-9508577-0-X.
- Fuller, Martin (2014). Talyllyn & Corris Steam Locomotives Volume 1: Pre-preservation and Manufacturers. Sara Eade. ISBN 978-0-9565652-5-9.
- Hatherhill, Ann and Gordon (2004). Narrow Gauge & Industrial Album. RCL Publications. ISBN 0-9538763-5-7.
- Holmes, Alan (2009). Talyllyn Revived. Talyllyn Railway. ISBN 978-0-900317-07-1.
- Little, Lawson. Carriages and Wagons of the Talyllyn Railway. Narrow Gauge Railway Society. ISBN 978-0-9554326-4-4.
- Mitchell, David J.; Eyres, Terry (2005). The Talyllyn Railway. Past and Present Publishing Ltd. ISBN 1-85895-125-9.
- Morland, R. J. (2005). The Talyllyn Railway in Colour. R. J. Morland. ISBN 0-9549893-0-9.
- Potter, David (1990). The Talyllyn Railway. David St John Thomas. ISBN 0-946537-50-X.
- Ransom, P.J.G (1996). Narrow Gauge Steam: Its origins and world-wide development. Oxford Publishing Co. ISBN 0-86093-533-7.
- Sibley, Brian (1995). The Thomas the Take Engine Man. Heinemann. ISBN 0-434-96909-5.
- Rolt, L.T.C., ed. (1965). Talyllyn Century. David & Charles.
- Thomas, Cliff (2002). The Narrow Gauge in Britain and Ireland. Atlantic Publishing. ISBN 1-902827-05-8.
