= Henry Allason Fletcher =

English locomotive designer (1834-1884)

- Born: 24 July 1834; Greysouthen, England
- Died: 6 July 1884 (aged 49); Moresby, Cumbria, England
- Known for: Designing Talyllyn and Dolgoch

Henry Allason Fletcher was an English engineer and locomotive designer, best known for being the designer of the locomotives Dolgoch and Talyllyn.

== Early life ==
Fletcher was born in Greysouthen, Cumbria, to John Wilson Flecther and Mary Allason. He married Lucy Maria Sutton in 1868 Fletcher was educated at a private school. His family had been involved in the local coal industry for decades and he had been interested in mechanics since he was a child. He gained his work experience as a mechanical engineer at Gilkes, Wilkinson and Company in Middlesbrough. before returning to his local Whitehaven.

== Career ==
Fletcher returned to his hometown of Whitehaven in 1857 to work for Fletcher, Jennings & Co. which was founded by his father. He became managing partner, alongside Daniel Jennings and Edward Waugh. His most famous designs were the locomotives, Talyllyn and Dolgoch, both of which are still in service. Apart from designing locomotives he carried out new patents such as improvements in the boring and planing of metal, specialities in tank-locomotives and a third for improvements in the permanent-way of railways. Fletcher was considered very clever with sketching in pen or pencil and as a caricaturist was without equal. Fletcher was president of the Whitehaven Scientific Society, to which he wrote on the Archaeology of the Iron Trade of West Cumberland. He was also a magistrate and chairman at Moresby School. Fletcher retired in 1884 from ill health. He oversaw the construction of 171 locomotives.

Fletcher died at 49 due to tuberculosis.
