= Smudger =

Smudger may refer to:

- Smudger, nickname of Ross Smith (darts player)
- Smudger, Thomas and Friends steam engine character
