= Townsend Hook (locomotive) =

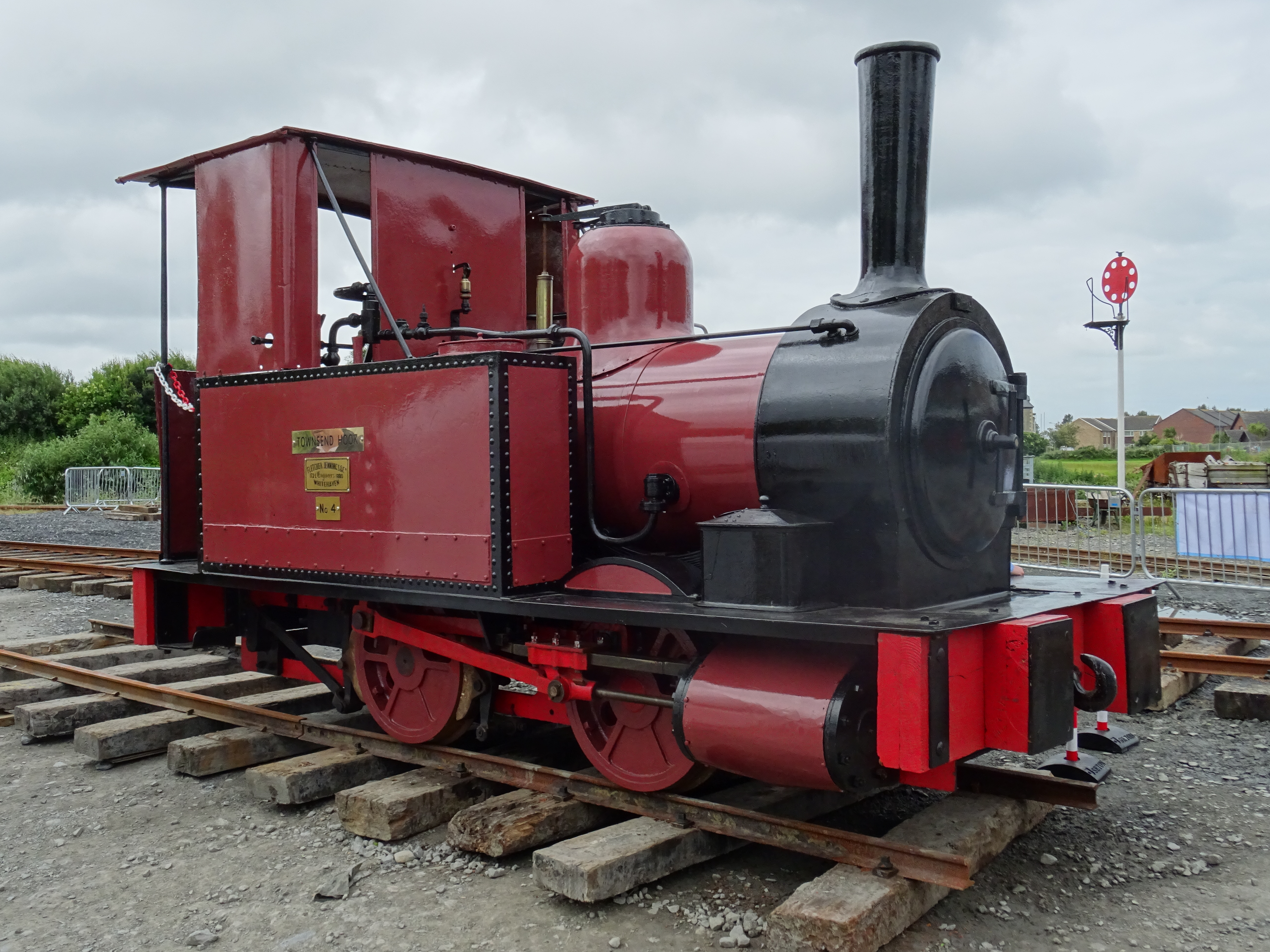
- Townsend Hook visiting the Talyllyn Railway.
Type and origin
- Power type: Steam
- Builder: Fletcher, Jennings & Co.
- Serial number: 172L
- Model: E
- Build date: 1880
- Total produced: 2
Specifications
- Configuration
  - Whyte: 0-4-0T
- Gauge: 3 ft 2 1/4 in (972 mm)
- Boiler pressure: 150 psi (1,000 kPa)
- Cylinders: Two
- Loco brake: Hand
- Train brakes: None
Career
- Operators: Dorking Greystone Lime Co.
- Withdrawn: 1952
- Restored: 2010
- Disposition: Preserved at Amberley Museum & Heritage Centre

Townsend Hook is a 3 ft 2 1/4 in (972 mm) gauge Fletcher, Jennings & Co. 0-4-0T steam locomotive built in 1880 for the Dorking Greystone Lime Co. as works no. 172L. Townsend Hook is cosmetically restored and based at Amberley Museum & Heritage Centre, West Sussex.

== Industrial Service ==
In the late 1870s the Dorking Greystone Lime Co. of Betchworth, Surrey needed steam locomotives to work the narrow-gauge horse-drawn lines in their quarry. Following the success of their standard-gauge Fletcher Jennings 'B' class 0-4-0T No. 3 (later named Captain Baxter, now preserved at the Bluebell Railway), they decided to order from them again. Two new engines of type 'E', works Nos. 172L and 173L (later becoming Townsend Hook and William Finlay respectively) were built in early 1880 at Fletcher Jennings' Lowca Works and dispatched to Betchworth by rail.

As built

The locos had some early issues, such as the wooden brake blocks catching fire due to friction from braking heavy loads of chalk. This was remedied by fitting metal brake blocks on both engines. In time other modifications took place, like replacing the original Friedman injectors mounted underneath the cab with new Penberthy injectors mounted on the tank tops and the addition of partial cabs, as both were built and delivered cabless. Townsend Hook's boiler was replaced in 1897 and William Finlay's being replaced in 1922. In 1937 Townsend Hook was hit side-on by a line of wagons descending under gravity, knocking it eight feet down a ledge and dislodging the safety valves. The damage was not too extensive and Townsend Hook was quickly repaired. It was eventually withdrawn in 1952 with a broken axle bearing and placed into storage.

== Preservation ==
In 1960 Townsend Hook was acquired by the London Area Group of the Narrow Gauge Railway Society and moved to Sheffield Park station goods yard on the then-newly preserved Bluebell Railway. Townsend Hook was the first loco to be based on the Bluebell Railway in the preservation era, arriving around a month before the famous LB&SCR A1 class loco Stepney.

In 1962 the NGRS acquired a site in a former quarry at Brockham, Surrey, only a few miles from Betchworth, to build a museum dedicated to industrial and narrow gauge railways. Townsend Hook moved there in 1962, being joined there by former Betchworth Orenstein & Koppel diesel locos No. 6 Monty and No. 7 The Major, as well as two Betchworth wagons. In 1976 Townsend Hook appeared in the Doctor Who serial The Deadly Assassin, along with other Brockham exhibits.

In 1982, the Brockham Museum was forced to close, mainly due to access problems. Townsend Hook was moved, along with the rest of the collection, to Amberley Museum. There it stood outside until 1995, when it was moved to Eastleigh College to undergo restoration. Townsend Hook was dismantled and work undertaken on the frames, and new axle boxes and axle bearings were cast. However, due to a change in curriculum at the college work on Townsend Hook was abandoned. It was eventually returned to Amberley where it was stored in a partially dismantled condition until 2010, when work on a cosmetic overhaul was started in earnest. A return to steam is unlikely for the foreseeable future, due to the limited use the loco would receive, and also that many items such as the boiler and water tanks would need to be replaced.

In July 2016 Townsend Hook visited the Talyllyn Railway in Tywyn, Wales, as a static exhibit as part of a gala to bring together all five surviving locos in the UK built by Fletcher, Jennings and Co.

== See also ==
- Amberley Museum Railway
- Polar Bear (steam locomotive)
