= List of The Railway Series and Thomas & Friends characters =

The main characters of The Railway Series, as seen in the book The Eight Famous Engines

This article lists and describes the characters that have appeared in the British children's books The Railway Series, in the television adaptation of the books Thomas & Friends (which ran from 1984 to 2021), and in other media in the franchise based on the television series.

The Railway Series is a series of 42 books written by Wilbert Awdry and his son Christopher Awdry. Wilbert wrote the first 26 books from 1945 to 1972 beginning with The Three Railway Engines, while Christopher wrote the remaining 16 books from 1983 to 2011, concluding with Thomas and His Friends.

Unless otherwise stated, the technical notes come from Wilbert Awdry's notes when he was developing the characters and setting for his stories. These notes are cited in his publication The Island of Sodor: Its People, History and Railways.

== Introduced in The Railway Series ==
=== Standard gauge ===
==== Steam engines ====
Name	Description	First appearance	Based on	Voiced by (UK)	Voiced by (US)
Thomas	A blue tank engine who works on the North Western Railway on the Island of Sodor. He initially worked as the station pilot at Vicarstown, later Wellsworth. In the TV series, he was the station pilot at Knapford, since the "big station" was changed from Vicarstown, and later Tidmouth, to Knapford. After helping to rescue James from an accident, Thomas was rewarded by being promoted to run the Ffarquhar branch line with his two coaches, Annie and Clarabel.	Thomas the Tank Engine (1946)	LB&SCR E2 class (with extended side tanks)	Ben Small (2009–2015); John Hasler (2015–2021); Aaron Barashi (2021–2023); Shaun Jemmett (2023–2025); Harry Sparkes (2026–present)	Martin Sherman (2009–2015); Joseph May (2014–2021); Meesha Contreras (2021–2023); David Kohlsmith (2023); Kai Harris (2023–2025); Harry Sparkes (2026–present)
Edward	A blue mixed-traffic tender engine who works on the North Western Railway. He runs the Brendam branch line and is one of the oldest engines on Sodor.	The Three Railway Engines (1945)	Furness Railway K2 Class	Keith Wickham	William Hope
Henry	A green mixed-traffic tender engine who works on the North Western Railway. He was originally built as a prototype Gresley engine and had a smaller firebox. He needed special Welsh coal to operate properly. Following his accident when pulling the Flying Kipper Henry underwent an extensive rebuild, giving him a new shape and a better performance.	The Three Railway Engines (1945)	Built from a "stolen Gresley design" (old shape; Henry I); LMS Stanier "Black Five" (new shape; Henry II)	Keith Wickham (2009–2021); Chris Woodworth (2026–present)	Kerry Shale (2009–2021); Chris Woodworth (2026–present)
Gordon	A big blue tender engine who works on the North Western Railway. He is assigned to the Wild Nor' Wester express passenger train that runs from Tidmouth to London but occasionally hauls goods trains, much to his dislike, as he believes that these are below him. He and the Flying Scotsman are the only surviving Class A1/A3 engines. In the Railway Series Gordon was retired from the Wild Nor' Wester following the purchase of Pip and Emma and was relegated to stopping passenger trains. In the TV series he remains the express engine, is Spencer's cousin, and shares the express with Rebecca from the 22nd series to the 24th series.	The Three Railway Engines (1945)	LNER Class A1	Keith Wickham (2009–2021); Will-Harrison Wallace (2021–2025); Django Bevan (2026–present)	Kerry Shale (2009–2020); Neil Crone (2021–2025); Django Bevan (2026–present)
James	A red mixed-traffic tender engine who works on the North Western Railway. He is proud of his splendid red paintwork but tends to be vain, boastful, and overconfident. He does not like getting dirty. Despite being a mixed-traffic engine he does not like pulling coaches and trucks, and with the exception of the big engines feels superior to the others. James is an experimental 2-6-0 version of his class and was initially painted black. He was built with wooden brake blocks that caught fire easily, resulting in a crash on his first day and prompting Thomas to come and rescue him with the Breakdown Train. He was given a red livery to cheer him up and currently works on the main line as a special utility mixed-traffic engine, hauling passengers, goods, and occasionally the Wild Nor' Wester express.	Thomas the Tank Engine (1946)	Based on an unbuilt prototype experimental L&YR Class 28 with a front pony-truck and extended front running board.	Keith Wickham (2009–2017); Rob Rackstraw (2017–2021); Luke Marty (2021–2022); Tom Dussek (2022–2025); Nigel Pilkington (2026–present)	Kerry Shale (2009–2015); Rob Rackstraw (2015–2021); Luke Marty (2021–2025); Nigel Pilkington (2026–present)
Percy	A little green saddle tank engine who works on the North Western Railway. He was first brought to Sodor to help run the railway while Gordon, James, and Henry went on strike. He later became station pilot at Tidmouth, and after that at Knapford. Following the Knapford Harbour Improvement Scheme in 1955 and later renovation of the New Harbour, Percy was moved permanently to Thomas' branch line where he now works as a goods engine. His favourite job is pulling the mail train and he is Thomas's best friend.	Troublesome Engines (1950)	Closest basis isAvonside 0-4-0ST. Percy's real basis is unknown.	Keith Wickham (2009–2015); Nigel Pilkington (2015–2021); Henri Charles (2021–2023); Oliver Milchard (2023–2025); Oscar Elliott (2026–present)	Martin Sherman (2009–2015); Christopher Ragland (2015–2020); Charlie Zeltzer (2021–2025); Oscar Elliott (2026–present)
Toby	A square brown tram engine who works on the North Western Railway. He used to work on the Wisbech and Upwell Tramway in East Anglia, but was brought to Sodor to run the tramroad to Ffarquhar Quarry after his own line closed down. He has three coaches – Henrietta, the Quarryman's Coach, and Victoria – as well as a luggage van named Elsie. In the original TV series, before being bought by Sir Topham Hatt to run the tramroad to Ffarquhar Quarry, his tramway was located between Lower Arlesburgh and Arlesdale End. This line would later be reopened as part of the North Western Railway, with Toby being reallocated to his old shed. Henrietta is his only coach in the original TV series. In the All Engines Go reboot series, he moves to Sodor after his line on the Mainland is closed, and unlike in previous iterations, he does not have Henrietta as a coach.	Toby the Tram Engine (1952)	GER Class C53	Ben Small (2009–2015); Rob Rackstraw (2015–2021); Toby Hadoke (2022–2025)	William Hope (2009–2021); Eddie Glenn (2022–2025)
Duck	A green Great Western pannier tank engine who works on the North Western Railway. Duck's real name is Montague, and he goes by "Duck" because some engines say he "waddles"; Duck likes his nickname better than Montague. He believes that there are two ways of doing things: the Great Western way, and the wrong way. Duck runs the Little Western which runs north from Tidmouth along the west coast of Sodor to Arlesburgh. His autocoaches are Alice and Mirabel. In The Railway Series his coaches are Alice and Mirabel, and in the TV series his coaches are the Slip Coaches.	Percy the Small Engine (1956)	GWR 5700 Class	Steven Kynman	
Donald and Douglas	A pair of blue tender engines from Scotland who work on the North Western Railway. Originally numbered 57646 and 57647 and formerly painted British Rail black, the twins now work as general-purpose engines, primarily on the main line, the Brendam branch line, and the Little Western. In The Railway Series Douglas was given his own brake van, Toad, after he saved Oliver, Isabel, and Toad from scrap. In the Thomas & Friends franchise Toad remains with Oliver.	The Twin Engines (1960)	Caledonian Railway 812 and 652 Classes	Donald: Joe Mills (2015–2016); Rob Rackstraw (2016–2018); Douglas: Joe Mills	
Oliver	A green Great Western tank engine who works on the North Western Railway. After Isabel, Toad, and himself were saved from scrap by Douglas, Oliver now runs the Little Western with Duck and his two autocoaches, Isabel and Dulcie. In the original TV series only Oliver and Toad are saved by Douglas. And while Toad is given to Douglas as his brake van in The Railway Series, Toad remains with Oliver in the Thomas & Friends franchise.	Enterprising Engines (1968)	GWR 1400 Class	Joe Mills	
Bill and Ben	Dark yellow (later yellow) saddle tank engine twins belonging to the Sodor China Clay Company. They both work in the china clay pits and at Brendam Docks, where they shunt trucks. Bill and Ben are Sodor's most mischievous engines, and like teasing and playing tricks on the other engines.	Main Line Engines (1966)	Bagnall 0-4-0ST "Alfred" and "Judy"	Bill: Jonathan Broadbent (2013–2016); Tim Whitnall (2018); Rasmus Hardiker (2018–2020); Ben: Jonathan Broadbent (2013–2016); Matt Wilkinson (2018–2020)	
Big City Engine	An express tender engine who worked for the London, Midland and Scottish Railway and later British Railways. He once had an argument with Gordon and Duck about what was the name of the big station in London: King's Cross, Euston, Paddington, or St. Pancras. However, none of the engines realised that London had several major stations, not just one.	The Eight Famous Engines (1957)	LMS "Patriot" Class		
Jinty and Pug	Two ex-LMS tank engines who once visited the North Western Railway on loan from British Railways while the Fat Controller and his engines went to be on display in London. Both are friends of Percy.	The Eight Famous Engines (1957)	LMS Fowler Class 3F (Jinty); LMS Kitson 0F (Pug)		
City of Truro	A famous tender engine from the Great Western Railway. In The Railway Series he visited the Island of Sodor in 1957 on a railtour and stayed for one night. He befriended Duck, another Great Western engine, and the two talked all night, much to Gordon's annoyance. He normally resides at the STEAM Museum in Swindon, Wiltshire.	Duck and the Diesel Engine (1958)	GWR 3700 Class 3440 City of Truro		
Stepney	A tank engine from the Bluebell Railway named after a district in London. In The Railway Series his friendly, enthusiastic attitude makes him a welcome visitor on the Fat Controller's railway. In the original TV series he was saved from scrap by Rusty, and now works on the Bluebell Line on the Island of Sodor.	Stepney the "Bluebell" Engine (1963)	LB&SCR A1X class 55 Stepney		
Neil	A tank engine with an unusual box shape, originating from the Sodor and Mainland Railway. In a flashback in Very Old Engines he helps to transport Skarloey from Kirk Ronan Harbour to his new home at Crovan's Gate. He warned Skarloey about V-tipper wagons and they became friends. In Sodor: Reading Between the Lines, Christopher Awdry mentions that Neil is still around but his whereabouts are unknown. In the book's second edition, published in 2025, it was revealed that Neil had been found and donated by Sir Richard Topham Hatt to the Crovan's Gate Preservation Society in 2023, the first rail museum proper on Sodor which was being helmed by the now retired Sir Topham Hatt III. Neil has operated at the new Crovan's Gate museum since then.	Very Old Engines (1965)	Neilson 0-4-0 box tank		
Flying Scotsman	An LNER Class A3, and formerly a Class A1. Flying Scotsman holds the record for being the first engine to officially run at over 100 mph. In addition he has been described as the world's most famous steam engine. Flying Scotsman is named after a service that runs from London King's Cross to Edinburgh Waverley. He is the last of Gordon's brothers.	Enterprising Engines (1968)	LNER Class A3 4472 Flying Scotsman	Rufus Jones	
Bloomer	A tender engine who originally worked on the London & North Western Railway before he was withdrawn from service and was placed in an old shed. In 1975 Bloomer was discovered by Sir Charles Topham Hatt, who restored him to working order in time to take part in the 1975 Shildon Cavalcade which celebrated 150 years of the Stockton and Darlington Railway. Nowadays Bloomer mainly runs excursion trains around the island, usually on the Ffarquhar Branch.	The Island of Sodor: Its People, History and Railways (1987)	LNWR Bloomer Class		
Wilbert	A dark blue saddle tank engine named after the Thin Clergyman (Wilbert Awdry), who was a one-time president of the Dean Forest Railway. In Wilbert the Forest Engine the Fat Controller arranges for Wilbert to come help on his railway. During his visit Wilbert tells Thomas and Toby the story of his brother Sixteen, accidentally filled up with milk instead of water and having to use a coil of wire to couple up to his damaged ballast truck.	Wilbert the Forest Engine (1994)	Hunslet Austerity 0-6-0ST		
Albert	A red tank engine who worked on the Furness Railway with his two coaches, Victoria and Helena. Albert was once buried in a tunnel by an avalanche after he lets off too much steam starting from the station, just one day after boasting about the snow.	Thomas and Victoria (2007)	Furness Railway J1 class		
Walter	A black austerity tank engine who was purchased by Sir Topham Hatt to help construct the extension from Arlesburgh Harbour to Harwick.	Sodor in 2025 (2025)	Hunslet Austerity 0-6-0ST		

==== Diesel engines ====
Name	Description	First appearance	Based on	Voiced by (UK)	Voiced by (US)
Diesel	A black diesel engine who originates from the Other Railway, later the Mainland. He was the first standard gauge diesel to arrive on Sodor. He initially caused trouble for Duck and the other steam engines and was sent away in disgrace by Sir Topham Hatt. In the TV Series Diesel was purchased by Sir Topham Hatt in the 7th series.	Duck and the Diesel Engine (1958)	British Rail Class 08	Kerry Shale (2010–2021); Henry Harrison (2021–2025); Leo Mechem (2026–present)	Michael Brandon (2010–2012); Martin Sherman (2013–2014); Kerry Shale (2015–2021); Shomoy James Mitchell (2021–2022); Will Bhaneja (2022–2025); Leo Mechem (2026–present)
Daisy	A green diesel railcar who came to work on the Ffarquhar branch line after Thomas crashed into the stationmaster's house. From Sodor's Legend of the Lost Treasure to the 24th series she works on the Harwick branch line carrying out passenger duties, while Ryan runs the goods duties.	Branch Line Engines (1961)	British Rail Class 101	Teresa Gallagher (2015–2016); Tracy-Ann Oberman (2016–2020)	
Class 40	A big diesel engine who once visited the North Western Railway on loan from British Railways, later the Other Railway. He was brought to Sodor to help the other engines. He intentionally sucked in an inspector's bowler hat through his air intake which lead to his engine failing. Afterwards he was sent away in disgrace, leaving behind "a rather nasty smell, and a battered bowler hat".	Stepney the "Bluebell" Engine (1963)	British Rail Class 40		
BoCo	A green mixed-traffic diesel engine who primarily works on Edward's branch line and occasionally on the main line. He and Edward act as mentors to Bill and Ben.	Main Line Engines (1966)	British Rail Class 28		
Bear	A green (originally blue) mixed-traffic diesel engine who works on the main line. Originally numbered "D7101" he first came to Sodor in 1967. 7101 suffered from a leaking brake ejector and was helped by Henry along with Diesel 199. 7101 was nicknamed "Bear" due to the "growling" sound his engine makes. He was given a new number, D3, and a new coat of paint. He pulls the "Limited", and the Wild Nor' Wester whenever the big engines are busy or unavailable.	Enterprising Engines (1968)	British Rail Class 35		
Diesel 199	A diesel engine who once visited the North Western Railway on trial from British Railways. He soon made himself an enemy of the steam engines. Diesel 199 failed at a signal box in Kellsthorpe Road while pulling a train of fuel and oil tankers, needing Henry to come and help. The signalman called 199 "Spamcan" as an insult. After 7101 fails with the Limited, Henry helps both diesels and their trains to the next station. The Fat Controller was not pleased with 199 and soon sent him back to the Other Railway in disgrace for offending The Fat Controller's engines.	Enterprising Engines (1968)	British Rail Class 46		
Mavis	A diesel shunter who works for the Ffarquhar Quarry Company. In The Railway Series she is privately owned by the Ffarquhar Quarry, while in Thomas & Friends she is owned by the North Western Railway. She mainly shunts trucks around the quarry's sidings, and learned how to keep the trucks in line thanks to advice from Toby.	The Railway Series: Surprise Packet (1971)	British Rail Class 04	Teresa Gallagher (2010–2017)	Jules de Jongh (2010–2012); Teresa Gallagher (2013–2017)
Pip and Emma	Two diesel-electric driving cars from an InterCity 125 trainset. They had experienced problems with their cooling systems and came to Sodor in 1986. In 2011, following the Privatisation of British Rail, the Fat Controller purchased them in order to run an express service from Tidmouth to London. They brought Prince Charles to Tidmouth to unveil a statue of the Thin Clergyman to celebrate his 100th birthday.	Gordon the High-Speed Engine (1987)	British Rail Class 43 High Speed Train		

==== Rolling stock ====
Name	Description	First appearance	Voiced by (UK)	Voiced by (US)
Annie and Clarabel	Thomas's faithful coaches whom he loves dearly. The pair work on the Ffarquhar branch line with Thomas.	Thomas the Tank Engine (1946)	Annie: Teresa Gallagher (2012–2021); Catherine Disher (2021–2022); Wendy Patterson (2022–2025); Hollie Taylor (2026–present); Clarabel: Teresa Gallagher (2012–2021); Linda Kash (2021–2022); Wendy Patterson (2022–2025); Jenny Fitzpatrick (2026–present)	Annie: Teresa Gallagher (2012–2021); Catherine Disher (2021–2025); Hollie Taylor (2026–present); Clarabel: Teresa Gallagher (2012–2021); Linda Kash (2021–2025); Jenny Fitzpatrick (2026–present)
Henrietta	A tram coach that travels with Toby, Elsie, Victoria, and the Quarryman's Coach. In the TV series, Percy usually takes her when Toby is absent.	Toby the Tram Engine (1952)	Maggie Ollerenshaw	
Isabel, Dulcie, Alice and Mirabel	Four ex-Great Western autocoaches who are pulled by Duck and Oliver on the Little Western. Isabel joined Oliver and Toad when they escaped from the Other Railway. Afterwards, the Fat Controller was able to rescue Dulcie, Alice, and Mirabel in order to handle the passenger traffic.	Enterprising Engines (1968)		
Toad	A 20-ton Great Western brake van. He escaped from scrap along with Oliver and Isabel. In The Railway Series, upon restoration, Toad became Douglas's loyal brake van. In the TV series, he remains as Oliver's brake van.	Enterprising Engines (1968)	Joe Mills	
Troublesome Trucks	Open wagons which carry goods on the railway, nicknamed because they can be very troublesome and play tricks on the engines.	The Three Railway Engines (1945)	Ben Small (2012–2014); Kerry Shale (2017–2021)	
The Spiteful Brake Van	A troublesome and impolite brake van who was subsequently crushed into pieces by Douglas on the back of James's goods train.	The Twin Engines (1960)		
S.C. Ruffey	A privately owned wagon who worked for S.C. Ruffey & Co. Ballast Contractors but was kept in very poor condition by his owners. Like the majority of trucks he was badly behaved and highly disrespectful towards the engines, exemplified by him singing a very rude song about Oliver's derailment in the turntable well whenever he saw Oliver pass by. However he received his comeuppance when Toad hatched a plan with Oliver to place S.C Ruffey at the front of the train and – acting on advice Stepney gave to Duck – sand the rails to give Oliver a firm grip when starting. But by this time S.C. Ruffey had already instructed the trucks to 'hold back', thus restraining the train from moving. Coupled with Oliver's tractive effort at the front and S.C. Ruffey's poor condition, this resulted in him being pulled apart. Following this the trucks warn each other about what they perceive to be the consequences of teasing Oliver. S.C. Ruffey's ultimate fate varies between The Railway Series and the TV series. In The Railway Series he is scrapped, having been deemed unserviceable, while in the TV series he is repaired and remains silent.	Oliver the Western Engine (1969)		
Victoria	A vintage four-wheeled coach originating from the Furness Railway. She was built in 1882 and worked on the Lakeside and Haverthwaite branch line with Albert and Helena. After leaving service Victoria was moved to Sodor and turned into a summer house in a garden close to Elsbridge. After being discovered in Thomas and Victoria, it is decided that Victoria could be restored and used on the line to Ffarquhar Quarry to help Toby and Henrietta.	Thomas and Victoria (2007)		

=== Narrow gauge ===
==== Steam engines ====
Name	Description	First appearance	Based on	Voiced by
Skarloey	A red narrow gauge saddle tank engine who is one of the eldest and most faithful engines on Sodor.	Four Little Engines (1955)	Talyllyn	Keith Wickham
Rheneas	A vermilion narrow gauge well tank engine who is nicknamed "Gallant Old Engine" after saving the railway from closure.	Four Little Engines (1955)	Dolgoch	Ben Small (2012–2015) John Hasler (2016)
Sir Handel	A red (formerly blue) narrow gauge saddle tank engine who was named after Sir Handel Brown, the first manager. His original name when he worked on the Mid-Sodor Railway was Falcon, after the Falcon Works where he was built.	Four Little Engines (1955)	Sir Haydn	Keith Wickham
Peter Sam	A red (originally green) narrow gauge saddle tank engine named after the previous controller. His original name when he worked on the Mid-Sodor Railway was Stuart. Following an accident with some slate trucks in 1958, Peter Sam lost his old funnel and was fitted with a Giesl ejector in 1961.	Four Little Engines (1955)	Edward Thomas	Steven Kynman
Duncan	A grumpy Scottish red (later yellow) narrow gauge well tank engine who came to Sodor as a spare engine after Peter Sam's accident with slate trucks.	The Little Old Engine (1959)	Douglas	Tom Stourton
Ivo Hugh	A young narrow gauge tank engine who is named in honour of the former chief mechanical engineer Mr. Ivo Hugh. Ivo Hugh was built in 1996 at Crovan's Gate Works by the Engineering Department in New Little Engine. Ivo Hugh is the only side-tank locomotive on the railway and is powerful enough to handle the heaviest work.	New Little Engine (1996)	Tom Rolt	
Duke	An old red-brown (later orange-brown) narrow gauge tank-tender engine who worked on the Mid-Sodor Railway from its opening in 1880 until its closure in 1947. He was left in the sheds for the next 22 years before being found and rescued in 1969. Duke was then relocated to the Skarloey Railway where he was reunited with Sir Handel and Peter Sam and still works there today.	Duke the Lost Engine (1970)	Prince	
Godred	A narrow gauge mountain-climbing engine who worked on the Culdee Fell Railway. He was the original engine on the railway and is named after one of Sodor's historical rulers, Godre, whose story is told by Culdee in Mountain Engines. Shortly after the railway opened he lost contact with the rack rail at a loosened rail joint and plunged sideways over a cliff. No-one was injured except for Godred who was so badly damaged that he was scrapped, with his parts being used to repair other engines. This incident is based directly upon the Snowdon Mountain Railway's opening day accident when their No. 1 L.A.D.A.S suffered a similar accident. However it is unknown whether Godred's incident or Godred himself were actually real or had been made up by Culdee, as Godred's sole Railway Series appearance is at the end of Bad Look Out.	Mountain Engines (1964)	L.A.D.A.S.	
Ernest	A narrow gauge mountain-climbing engine who arrived in 1900 to work on the Culdee Fell Railway.	Mountain Engines (1964)	Enid	
Wilfred	A narrow gauge mountain-climbing engine who arrived in 1900 to work on the Culdee Fell Railway.	Mountain Engines (1964)	Wyddfa	
Culdee	A narrow gauge mountain-climbing engine named after Culdee Fell, the mountain his railway climbs, and the principal engine on the Culdee Fell Railway. When introduced in Mountain Engines he had been overhauled in Switzerland between 1962 and 1963 and was on the last stage of his journey home. Culdee has great respect for dangers found on the line and relies on his coach, Catherine, to help him travel safety.	Mountain Engines (1964)	Snowdon	
Shane Dooiney	A narrow gauge mountain-climbing engine who arrived in 1900 to work on the Culdee Fell Railway. He is named after the mountain Shane Dooiney (Dooiney is Manx Gaelic for "man", similar to the Irish duine).	Mountain Engines (1964)	Moel Siabod	
Lord Harry / Patrick	A narrow gauge mountain-climbing engine who arrived in 1962 to work on the Culdee Fell Railway and was named after the manager. Lord Harry was reckless when he was new and scared his coaches by taking risks. After he derailed and disgraced himself, Lord Harry was punished by having his name taken away. He asked for a second chance and was given a job doing lowly shunting. He was fittingly renamed "Patrick" in honour of the climber who risked his life to help others.	Mountain Engines (1964)	Padarn	
Alaric	A narrow gauge mountain-climbing engine who arrived in 1962 to work on the Culdee Fell Railway.	Mountain Engines (1964)	Ralph	
Eric	A narrow gauge mountain-climbing engine who arrived in 1962 to work on the Culdee Fell Railway.	Mountain Engines (1964)	Eryri	

==== Diesel engines ====
Name	Description	First appearance	Based on	Voiced by
Rusty	A little black (later orange) narrow gauge diesel engine who carries out maintenance work on the Skarloey Railway.	The Little Old Engine (1959)	Midlander	Matt Wilkinson
Fred	The railway's second diesel engine is mentioned in New Little Engine. According to the book Sodor: Reading Between the Lines, Fred entered service in 1989 having been acquired from the National Coal Board (NCB).	New Little Engine (1996)	Alf	

==== Rolling stock ====
Name	Description	First appearance
Agnes, Ruth, Jemina, Lucy and Beatrice	The oldest coaches on the Skarloey Railway, with Beatrice being the guard's van. On Market Days the coaches were sometimes very full, so that third-class passengers were allowed to ride in Agnes, making her angry. In 1952 Sir Handel made fun of the coaches by calling them "cattle trucks", which resulted in them holding him back on the hill.	Four Little Engines (1955)
Ada, Jane and Mabel	Three open-topped carriages who were acquired at one point prior to 1958 while Rheneas and Skarloey were away being overhauled. They were originally used for transporting quarry workmen but were later used for tourist traffic on sunny days. When some BBC Television producers visited Sodor to film a documentary about the Skarloey Railway, Ada, Jane, and Mabel had the honour of transporting the television equipment and cameras for them as part of the "Television Train".	The Little Old Engine (1959)
Cora	A tool van and also occasionally a guard's van who works on the Skarloey Railway. Cora was built by the Falcon Works for the Mid-Sodor Railway where she was a tool van, but served as Stuart's guard's van on one occasion. She was accepted for sale following the closure in 1947. Cora was used as a guard's van whenever Beatrice was not available, and then returned to her original use after Millicent's arrival in 1955.	The Little Old Engine (1959)
Gertrude and Millicent	Two bogie coaches that were built at Crovan's Gate from around 1952 to 1958 on a pair of former Mid-Sodor Railway coach chassis. Gertrude served as a passenger coach while Millicent was built with a guard's compartment which Peter Sam described as a "cupboard place". When the BBC Television producers visited Sodor, Gertrude was filled with wires and instruments as part of the "Television Train".	The Little Old Engine (1959)
Catherine	A coach who works with Culdee on the Culdee Fell Railway. Unlike most coaches Catherine is actually coupled in front of Culdee and is responsible for warning him of dangers ahead on the tracks.	Mountain Engines (1964)

=== Miniature gauge ===
==== Steam engines ====
Name	Description	First appearance	Based on	Voiced by
Bert	A blue tender engine who is the oldest and quietest of all the engines on the railway.	Small Railway Engines (1967)	River Irt	Keith Wickham
Rex	A green tender engine who enjoys teasing Mike. He is a hard worker but sometimes has a problem with traction.	Small Railway Engines (1967)	River Esk	Tom Stourton
Mike	A red tender engine who prefers goods trains to passengers.	Small Railway Engines (1967)	River Mite	Tim Whitnall
Jock	A yellow tender engine who was built by the Arlesburgh Works between 1972 and 1976 to cover a shortage of power.	The Island of Sodor: Its People, History and Railways (1987)	Northern Rock	

==== Diesel engines ====
Name	Description	First appearance	Based on
Frank	A grumpy but kind diesel engine who was built by the Arlesburgh Works around 1967.	Narrow Gauge Rails in Sodor (1972)	Perkins
Blister I and Blister II	A pair of twin tractor engines used for maintenance and shunting.	The Island of Sodor: Its People, History and Railways (1987)	Cyril
Sigrid of Arlesdale	A works engine who runs employee services.	The Island of Sodor: Its People, History and Railways (1987)	Shelagh of Eskdale
Ford	Originally bought for quarry trains in the 1970s. It had power problems and was sold to a quarry in England for short shunting.	Narrow Gauge Rails in Sodor (1972)	Les

=== Non-rail vehicles ===
Name	Description	First appearance	Based on	Voiced by (UK)	Voiced by (US)
Terence	An orange caterpillar tractor who usually works near Thomas's branch line and is driven and owned by Farmer Finney. When Thomas first met Terence he insulted him for having 'ugly' caterpillar tracks, but later regretted it and befriended Terence after he pulled Thomas out of a snowdrift Thomas was stuck in.	Tank Engine Thomas Again (1949)	1940s agricultural crawler tractor	Tom Stourton (2017–2019); Will Bridgewood (2023–2025)	Tom Stourton (2017–2019); Kai Harris (2023); Milo Toriel-McGibbon (2024–2025)
Bertie	A red single-deck bus who works alongside Thomas's branch line. Bertie had a race with Thomas to Ffarquhar after claiming he was the faster of the two, but lost after having to stop at a traffic light.	Tank Engine Thomas Again (1949)	Leyland Tiger	Rupert Degas (2011–2012); Keith Wickham (2013–2020); Rory Barnett (2026–present)	
Trevor	A traction engine driven by Jem Cole who resides at the Wellsworth Vicarage Orchard. He was due to be broken up for scrap before he was saved by the Vicar of Wellsworth.	Edward the Blue Engine (1954)	William Foster & Co. Traction Engine No. 1459	Nigel Pilkington	Christopher Ragland
Harold	A white helicopter who patrols the skies of the Island of Sodor searching for emergencies. When Harold first met Percy he insulted the railways as "slow and out-of-date". Cross at this, Percy decided to race Harold to Knapford Harbour, later the New Harbour.	Percy the Small Engine (1956)	Sikorsky S-55	Keith Wickham (2010–2021); Jai Armstrong (2022–2025); Paul Panting (2026–present)	Kerry Shale (2010–2021); Bruce Dow (2022–2025); Paul Panting (2026–present)
George	A grumpy green steamroller owned by the Sodor Island Council whose interactions with the engines generally lead to trouble. Whenever he is flattening a road he chants "Railways are no good! Turn them into roads! Pull 'em up! Turn them into roads!". Despite being bad-tempered and mean to the engines he readily learns his lesson after the events of "Bye George!"	Gallant Old Engine (1962)	Aveling-Barford R Class steamroller		
Caroline	An elderly car owned by a cricketer from the Elsbridge Cricket Club. She tends to overheat when travelling at high speeds.	Stepney the "Bluebell" Engine (1963)	Morris Oxford bullnose		
Bulgy	A bad-tempered double-decker bus with an ideological opposition to railways. His catchphrase is "Free the roads!" He was never repaired after becoming stuck underneath a bridge while taking a shortcut and was converted into a henhouse. But in the TV series, after a second chance at carrying passengers goes horribly wrong, he ends up becoming a mobile vegetable stand and is much happier with the new role.	Oliver the Western Engine (1969)	AEC Regent III	Colin McFarlane	
Bulstrode	A grumpy, self-propelled barge who carries coal and stone at Knapford Harbour. One day he shouted at a line of stone-carrying trucks for being too slow. Fed up with his verbal abuse, the Troublesome Trucks decided to take their revenge. While Percy was shunting them near the edge of the quay the trucks purposely surged forward, broke away, and plunged over the edge straight into Bulstrode's hull. In the aftermath he was stripped of his machinery and turned into a children's seaside play structure. He remains permanently marooned on the beach, trapped in one spot and left with nothing to do but grumble at the passing seagulls.	Toby, Trucks and Trouble (1988)	1920s self-propelled coastal barge	Will Harrison-Wallace (2021–2025)	Jamie Watson (2021–2025)

=== Humans ===
==== Hatt family ====
Name	Description	Voiced by (UK)	Voiced by (US)
Sir Topham Hatt	Also known as "The Fat Controller" in the United Kingdom, he is the controller of the North Western Railway on the Island of Sodor. In The Railway Series, there are four Fat Controllers: Sir Topham Hatt I (1880–1956); Sir Charles Topham Hatt II (1914–1997); Sir Stephen Topham Hatt III (1941–present); and Richard Topham Hatt IV (1972–present). In the Thomas & Friends franchise, there is only one Fat Controller.	Keith Wickham (2009–2021); Bruce Dow (2021–2022); Tom Duseek (2022–2025); Gene Foad (2026–present)	Kerry Shale (2009–2015); Bruce Dow (2021–2025); Gene Foad (2026–present)
Lady Hatt	Sir Topham's wife, who is very kind and friendly towards the engines.	Teresa Gallagher (2010–2019)	Jules de Jongh (2010–2011)
Stephen Hatt	Sir Topham and Lady Hatt's grandson and Bridget's brother. In The Railway Series he grows up to be Sir Stephen Topham Hatt III, while in the Thomas & Friends franchise he remains a child.	Matt Wilkinson (2010); Teresa Gallagher (2010–2020); Rachel Miller (2020)	Kerry Shale (2010)
Bridget Hatt	Sir Topham and Lady Hatt's granddaughter and Stephen's sister.	Teresa Gallagher (2010–2020); Rachael Miller (2020)	Jules de Jongh (2010)

==== Recurring ====
Name	Description	Voiced by (UK)	Voiced by (US)
Mrs. Kitty Kyndley	An elderly lady who lives in a cottage near Hackenback Tunnel.		
Jem Cole	Trevor's driver who helped save him from scrap when Edward found him.	Christopher Ragland	
The Reverend	A vicar who lives at the Vicarage near Edward's branch line. In Thomas & Friends the Vicar regularly holds Sunday School outings, fetes, and garden parties and often employs Jem Cole and Trevor to give rides at such holidays. He keeps bees in the orchard and gives some of the honey to his friends. In The Railway Series the character of the Vicar appears in the books Edward the Blue Engine and Thomas and the Twins.		
The Refreshment Lady	She sells tea and other refreshments to passengers on the Narrow Gauge Railway from her shop at the bay called "Neptune's Refreshments".		
Tom Tipper	A postman who services Callan.		
Nancy	A guard's daughter who lives near the Skarloey Railway and occasionally polishes the engines that work there.		
Richard Robert Norramby	The current Earl of Sodor and the owner of the engines Stephen, Millie, Glynn, and Ulfstead Castle. His official title is Earl although he is popularly called "The Duke of Sodor", having succeeded to the title as a boy after his father was killed in the Second World War, as told in The Railway Series. In The Island of Sodor: Its People, History and Railways he is called Richard Robert Norramby, who returned to Sodor after travelling around the world, restored Ulfstead Castle, turned it into a visitor attraction, and opened the loop line to Lakeside on the Skarloey Railway..	Mike Grady	
Mr. Fergus Duncan	Also known as "The Small Controller", he is the controller of the Arlesdale Railway.	Rob Rackstraw	

== Introduced in Thomas & Friends ==
=== Standard gauge ===
==== Steam engines ====
Name	Description	Based on	Voiced by (UK)	Voiced by (US)
Emily	An emerald green tender engine who works on the North Western Railway. When Emily was new to Sodor she borrowed and pulled Annie and Clarabel without Thomas's knowledge and was ignored by the other engines. The matter was resolved after she saved Oliver from a nasty accident and was rewarded with two new coaches. Emily may be bossy and irritating sometimes but like the other engines she can also be a really useful engine.	GNR Stirling 4-2-2	Teresa Gallagher (2009–2021); Marie Ekins (2022–2024)	Jules de Jongh (2009–2020); Kayla Lorette (2022–2024)
Nia	An orange tank engine from Kenya who works on the North Western Railway. She used to work on the East African Railways and came to Sodor after befriending and accompanying Thomas during his journey around the world. She often helps out at the Sodor Animal Park on the Brendam branch line.	KUR ED1 class	Yvonne Grundy (2018–2021); Sade Smith (2021–2025); Ellie-Mae Siame (2026–present)	Yvonne Grundy (2018–2021); Talia Evans (2021–2025); Ellie-Mae Siame (2026–present)
Rebecca	A yellow tender engine who works on the North Western Railway. She is a member of the Steam Team and helps Gordon pull the express during busy periods. Otherwise she performs mixed-traffic duties on the main line.	SR West Country and Battle of Britain classes	Rachael Miller	
Lady	A small magenta Victorian-styled tank engine who appears in the 2000 film Thomas and the Magic Railroad. She is legendary among all engines on the Island of Sodor for her magical powers. In the 2005 film Thomas & Friends: Calling All Engines! she appears in a dream that Thomas has.	GWR 101 Class (possible)	Britt Allcroft	
Harvey	A maroon crane tank engine who works on the North Western Railway. He helps put the engines back on the track after accidents.	Shelton Iron & Steel Works No. 4101, or "Dusby" *	Keith Wickham	
Fergus	A small railway traction engine who works at the Sodor Cement Works.	Aveling & Porter 2-2-0WT "Blue Circle"		
Arthur	A big maroon tank engine originating from the London, Midland and Scottish Railway who runs the branch line to the Fishing Village. He was very proud of his spotless record, broken when he accidentally crashed into Duck's goods train after Thomas rudely tricked him.	LMS Ivatt Class 2 2-6-2T		
Murdoch	An orange tender engine who works on the main line of the North Western Railway. He pulls heavy goods trains, likes to have fun, and is very shy.	BR Standard Class 9F		
Spencer	The Duke and Duchess of Boxford's silver streamlined tender engine from the Mainland is Gordon's cousin and arch rival. Like Gordon, he has a tendency to be very arrogant, albeit much more frequently.	LNER Class A4	Matt Wilkinson	Glenn Wrage
Molly	A yellow mixed-traffic tender engine who lives on the Island of Sodor and primarily works on the main line of the North Western Railway. She also helps out with Henry.	GER Class D56		
Neville	A black square-shaped tender engine who works on the North Western Railway. He has a bridge named after his brutal accident.	SR Q1 class		
Rosie	A tomboy tank engine who works on the North Western Railway. She originally wore a lavender livery and primarily worked at Knapford Yards, but was later repainted red and is now the head shunter at Vicarstown.	S100 SR USA class	Teresa Gallagher (2010–2012); Nicola Stapleton (2017–2020); Iliana Vargas Brock (2026–present)	Jules de Jongh (2010–2012); Nicola Stapleton (2017–2020); Iliana Vargas Brock (2026–present)
Whiff	A grubby green tank engine who works on the Island of Sodor. He wears glasses and his main task is to collect rubbish and scrap with Scruff, which explains his dirty appearance and bad smell.	NER 66 Aerolite	Keith Wickham (2010–2018); Matt Coles (All Engines Go)	William Hope (2010–2018); Joe Pingue (All Engines Go)
Billy	An orange saddle tank engine with prominent buckteeth who works on the North Western Railway. He forgets things and tries to ignore Thomas, being very silly until Thomas tells him to stop.	Manning Wardle		
Stanley	A silver saddle tank engine who works as both a shunting engine and a mixed-traffic engine on the North Western Railway. He made Thomas jealous when he first arrived on Sodor.	Hudswell Clarke's 0-6-0ST	Matt Wilkinson (2011–2018); David Menkin (2015); Rob Rackstraw (2020)	Kerry Shale (2011); Ben Small (2011–2015); David Menkin (2015); Rob Rackstraw (2016–2020); John Schwab (2016)
Hank	An American tender engine who works on the North Western Railway. Both helpful and confident, a welcome party was thrown for him when he first arrived on Sodor.	Pennsylvania Railroad class K4		
Flora	A bright yellow steam tram who works for Sodor Tramways in Great Waterton. She has her own tramcar, of which she is proud.	Mostly Road Steam Tram		
Hiro	An old and wise tender engine from Japan who is famously known as the "Master of the Railway". Thomas found him hidden away in an old forest and had his friends help repair him. He was sent back to Japan several times, but later ends up joining the North Western Railway.	JNR Class D51	Togo Igawa (2009–2021, 2026–present); Dai Tabuchi (2021–2025)	Togo Igawa (2009–2021, 2026–present); Kintaro Akiyama (2021–2025)
Charlie	A playful purple saddle tank engine who works on the Island of Sodor as a shunter in Knapford Yards. He heavily enjoys telling jokes.	Manning Wardle	Matt Wilkinson (2010–2014); Steven Kynman (2016)	Glenn Wrage (2010–2011); Ben Small (2012–2014); Steven Kynman (2016)
Bash and Dash	Fun-loving well tank engine twins who live on Misty Island with Ferdinand.	Bear Harbor Lumber Company No. 1	Matt Wilkinson (Bash); Keith Wickham (Dash)	William Hope (Bash); Kerry Shale (Dash)
Ferdinand	A humble tender engine who lives on Misty Island with Bash and Dash.	Climax Class C	Ben Small	Glenn Wrage
Scruff	A green vertical-boiler tank engine who works at the Waste Dump and is Whiff's assistant. He likes being smelly.	Sentinel 969 0-4-0 Industrial Locomotive	Matt Wilkinson	Kerry Shale
Belle	A blue firefighting tank engine who is part of the Search and Rescue Team and has a bell and water cannons on top of her tanks.	BR Standard Class 4 2-6-4T	Teresa Gallagher	
Stephen	An old, wooden steam engine who works at Ulfstead Castle, where he takes visitors around the castle grounds and across the rest of Sodor.	Stephenson's Rocket	Bob Golding	
Connor	An aquamarine streamlined tender engine from the Mainland who is designed and built for speed. He has his own rake of coaches painted in the same livery as him.	New York Central Hudson	Jonathan Forbes	
Caitlin	A streamlined magenta tender engine from the Mainland who is designed and built for speed. She has her own rake of coaches painted in the same livery as her.	Baltimore and Ohio P-7	Rebecca O'Mara (2013–2016); Jules de Jongh (2017–2019)	
Porter	A viridian saddle tank engine who works at Brendam Docks, usually shunting trucks.	H.K. Porter 0-6-0ST	Steven Kynman (2013–2019)	David Menkin
Timothy	A blue oil-burning saddle tank engine who works at the Sodor China Clay Company with Bill, Ben, and Marion.	Bell Open Cab Oil Burner	Tim Whitnall	
Marion	An orange rail-mounted steam shovel owned by the Sodor China Clay Company. She works at the Clay Pits or any other digging site on the North Western Railway.	Marion Model 40	Olivia Colman (2014–2018); Lucy Montgomery (2020)	
Gator	A large green tank engine from Colombia that ends up on Sodor by mistake. His real name is Gerald, but he was nicknamed "Gator" because his sloping water tank makes him look like an alligator. During his time on Sodor, he becomes friends with Percy.	Colombia Steam Motor	Clive Mantle	
Samson	A dark-teal cabless saddle tank engine who works with his brake van Bradford on the Mainland.	Barclay & Co. No. 214	Robert Wilfort	
Glynn	A "coffee-pot" engine that used to work on Thomas's branch line before being abandoned. He was restored and now works alongside Stephen and Millie at Ulfstead Castle.	Head Wringtson & Co. Ltd. Type 1 "Coffee Pot No. 1"	Keith Wickham	
Ryan	A purple tank engine originating from the Great Northern Railway. He works as a goods engine on the Harwick branch line.	GNR Class N2	Eddie Redmayne (2015); Steven Kynman (2016–2017)	
Ashima	A large pink Indian tank engine who worked on the Nilgiri Mountain Railway and later the Indian Railways. She was one of many engines to participate in the Great Railway Show and competed in the Shunting Challenge. She befriends Thomas after these events.	Nilgiri Mountain Railway X class	Tina Desai (2016–2020); Sandeep Garcha (2022–2025)	Tina Desai (2016–2020); Diya Kittur (2022–2025)
Gina	A small Italian tank engine who participated in the Shunting Challenge at the Great Railway Show.	FNM Class 200	Teresa Gallagher (2016); Anna Francolini (2019–2020)	
Yong Bao	A Chinese tender engine who took part in the Great Railway Show, competing in the Best Decorated Engine parade.	China Railways RM	Dan Li (2018–2019); Chris Lew Kumi Hoi (2020–2021); Lobo Chan (2022–2025)	Dan Li (2018–2019); Chris Lew Kum Hoi (2020–2021); Patrick Kwok-Choon (2022–2025)
Shane	An Australian tender engine who competed in the strongest engine competition in the Great Railway Show.	South Australian Railways 520 class	Shane Jacobson	
Rajiv	An Indian well tank engine who competed in and won the Best Decorated Engine parade in the Great Railway Show. He usually transports passengers and goods from Kolkata to the north of India on the East Indian Railway.	Fairy Queen locomotive	Nikhil Parmar	
Hurricane	A large well tank engine who works with Frankie at the steelworks on the Mainland.	GER Class A55	Jim Howick	
Theo	A shy experimental railway traction engine who works at the steelworks on the Mainland.	Aveling & Porter 0-2-OWT "Dark Green Circle"	Darren Boyd	
Lexi	A boisterous American cab-forward engine who works at the steelworks on the Mainland.	NPCRR Cab-Forward 4-4-0	Lucy Montgomery	
Merlin	An experimental tender engine with three funnels who believes he has the power to turn invisible.	LSWR N15 class	Hugh Bonneville	
Hong-Mei	A Chinese tank engine Thomas met during his stay in China whose main job is to pull the mail train. She has her own pair of coaches named An-An and Yin-Long, who are occasionally used by Thomas.	China Railways GJ	Chipo Chung	
Tamika	An Australian steam railmotor who works in the Kuranda Rainforest.	SAR SMC Class	Rose Robinson	
Lorenzo	An Italian tender engine from Verona who has a coach named Beppe. He was lost in a mine for several years before being rediscovered by Thomas.	FS Class 743	Vincenzo Nicoli	
Marcia and Marcio	Two wood-burning tender engines who work on the Eucalyptus Railway in Brazil.	ABPF No. 215 Maria Fumaca	Laura Cucurullo (Marcia); Federico Trujillo (Marcio)	
Sonny	A well tank engine who used to work at a coal mine and was bought to Sodor by two criminals named Baz and Bernie but later joined the North Western Railway. After meeting Thomas and helping out at the technology fair, he wanted to be a really useful engine rather than a thief. After Baz and Bernie were captured and arrested for their crimes, Sir Topham Hatt decided to give him a second chance by letting him work on his railway.	Haydock Collieries	Joe Swash	
Duchess	A large tender engine that works on the Mainland. Her job is to transport the Royal Family to all their royal appointments.	LMS Coronation Class	Rosamund Pike	

==== Diesel engines ====
Name	Description	Based on	Voiced by (UK)	Voiced by (US)
Derek	A large green diesel engine who is known for his initial "teething" troubles and works for the Sodor China Clay Company. He is friends with Bill and Ben and was not officially named until merchandise was released.	British Rail Class 17		
Class 40	A big diesel engine who once visited the North Western Railway on loan from British Railways, later the Other Railway. He was brought to Sodor to help the other engines. He intentionally sucked in an inspector's bowler hat through his air intake which lead to his engine failing. Afterwards he was sent away in disgrace, leaving behind "a rather nasty smell, and a battered bowler hat".			
'Arry and Bert	Twin diesel shunters who work at the Sodor Ironworks. They are as malicious as Diesel when it comes to their interactions with the steam engines, sometimes taking it further by attempting to force steam engines like Stepney into the smelter.	British Rail Class 08	Kerry Shale (2010–2011, 'Arry and Bert) (2012–2017, 'Arry); William Hope (2012–2017, Bert)	
Diesel 10	An evil diesel engine with an excavator claw arm called "Pinchy" extending from his roof who hates steam engines. Thomas said that he is rated "10 out of 10 for devious deeds and brutal strength". He is the antagonist in Thomas and the Magic Railroad and Day of the Diesels and had minor appearances in Calling All Engines! and the episode "The Missing Christmas Decorations".	British Rail Class 42	Neil Crone (2000); Matt Wilkinson (2011–2013)	
Splatter and Dodge	Diesel 10's bumbling sidekicks in Thomas and the Magic Railroad. Diesel 10 collectively calls them "Splodge" to save time. Despite being his minions both diesels appear reluctant to scrap a steam engine and are more prone to laughing at other's misfortunes than to doing any real villainy. They eventually turn against Diesel 10 when he chases after Thomas and Lady.	British Rail Class 08	Neil Crone (Splatter); Kevin Frank (Dodge)	
Salty	A dockside diesel shunter who works at Brendam Docks and speaks like a stereotypical pirate. He enjoys telling stories revolving around the sea and fantasy, but has a very different attitude towards the steam engines compared with the other diesels. He prioritises getting things done rather than who does it.	British Rail Class 07	Keith Wickham (2010–2021); Guy Harris (2023–2025)	Scott McCord (2023–2025)
Dennis	A lazy diesel shunter who works on the North Western Railway. He dislikes hard work but enjoys making other engines do it for him.	British Rail 11001		
Paxton	A green diesel shunter who often brings slate down from the Blue Mountain Quarry to other parts of the Island of Sodor. Unlike Diesel, he is friendly to every engine. Despite his kind nature he can be gullible, but means well.	British Rail Class 08	Keith Wickham (2011); Steven Kynman (2012–2020)	
Norman	A reddish-orange diesel shunter with a unibrow who works on the North Western Railway and is Dennis's twin. He lives at the Vicarstown Dieselworks and is often seen pulling goods trains.	British Rail 11001	Kerry Shale (2011); Rob Rackstraw (2013–2020)	
Sidney	A forgetful blue diesel shunter who often takes goods to the Mainland. He was left hanging in the Vicarstown Dieselworks without his wheels for a very long time until one Christmas Percy brought wheels for him to run again.	British Rail Class 08	Kerry Shale (2011); Bob Golding (2013–2019)	
Den	A big hydraulic diesel engine who works at the Dieselworks. He helps repair diesel engines with Dart.	4DH Sentinel Diesel-Hydraulic Shunter	Keith Wickham (2011–2020); Rupert Degas (2011)	
Dart	A small diesel shunter who helps repair diesel engines at the Dieselworks and is Den's assistant, although more talkative than Den.	Bagnall Diesel-Hydraulic Shunter	Rupert Degas (2011–2012); Steven Kynman (2013–2019)	
Flynn	A road-rail fire engine who is part of the Search and Rescue Team.	Oshkosh W800 ARRF	Rupert Degas (2011–2013); Ben Small (2013); Kerry Shale (2015); Rob Rackstraw (2015–2019)	
Philip	A little diesel boxcab who works on the Island of Sodor as a station pilot at Knapford and lives in Wellsworth Sheds with Edward.	Pennsylvania Railroad Class A6	Rasmus Hardiker	
Ulli	A diesel shunter who works on a shunting yard on the Mainland.	British Rail Class 08	John Schwab	
Hugo	A silver rail zeppelin, unique for being fitted with a propeller. He is very fast, and his spinning propellers make him very popular with passengers.	Schienenzeppelin	Rob Rackstraw	
Frankie	A diesel shunter who works at the steelworks on the Mainland and can be very commanding, being more talkative than Hurricane.	Hudswelle Clarke 0-6-0	Sophie Colquhoun	
Fernando	A teal diesel shunter who works on a railway near Brazil.	British Rail Class 08	Gabriel Porras	
Natalie	An American diesel shunter who works in San Francisco.	Bagnall Diesel-Hydraulic Shunter	Teresa Gallagher	
Shankar	A diesel shunter who works on the Indian Railway.	TGM23 Class	Sanjeev Bhaskar	
Noor Jehan	A diesel engine who works on Indian Railways, taking visitors on a tiger safari in a set of express coaches painted in the same livery as her and equivalent to real-life Maitree Express train livery.	Indian locomotive class WDM-2	Sheena Bhattessa	

==== Electric engines ====
Name	Number	Railway	Description	Based on	Voiced by (UK)	Voiced by (US)
Stafford	A battery-electric shunting engine who works in Knapford Yards.	NSR Battery-Electric No. 1	Keith Wickham			
Gustavo	A large electric engine who works on the Brazilian Railway.	Little Joe loco	Francisco Labbe			
Kenji	A high-speed electric engine from Japan who visited Sodor for the Technology Fair.	0 Series Shinkansen	Matt McCooey (2020); Dan Tabuchi (2021–2024)	Kintaro Akiyama (2021–2024)		

==== Rolling stock ====
Name	Description	Based on	Voiced by (UK)	Voiced by (US)
The Chinese Dragon	A colourful and exotic paper dragon, and a popular sight for carnival and funfair specials.			
Hector	A large hopper truck who lives on the North Western Railway. He started out as aggressive and troublesome and was once run off the rails by Thomas. Thomas later helped him to overcome his fear, and Hector cooperated from then on.	Bogie Hopper Wagon		
Bradford	A brake van who lives on the Mainland and usually works with Samson.	GWR 16 Ton Brake Van	Rob Rackstraw	
Dexter	An old brake coach who was converted into a mobile classroom for Harwick School after being rediscovered by Duck.	Stroudley Coach	Mark Moraghan	

=== Narrow gauge ===
==== Steam engines ====
Name	Description	Based on	Voiced by (UK)	Voiced by (US)
Freddie	An old narrow gauge tank engine on the Skarloey Railway and commonly nicknamed 'Fearless Freddie'.	Russell		
Smudger	An olive green narrow gauge tank engine who used to work on the Mid Sodor Railway. He was later turned into a generator due to his tendency to misbehave and derail frequently.	Dolgoch		
Bertram	An old narrow gauge tank-tender engine who worked at the mines. He lived on a remote part of the Island that was once rarely visited, but his railway has since been restored as a fairground and he now pulls passenger trains on it.	Festiniog Railway 0-4-0TT		
Mighty Mac	An indigo blue narrow gauge double-ended engine and conjoined twins. Mighty is the "older" of the two, while Mac is the "younger" half. Despite the opposing personalities of the two ends they are technically one engine.	Fairlie locomotive		
Proteus	A legendary yellow narrow gauge saddle tank engine with a magic lamp hung upon his funnel who now works on the Skarloey Railway.	Sir Haydn		
Victor	A red narrow gauge saddle tank engine from Cuba who works at the Sodor Steamworks with his assistant, Kevin.	Minaz Co., No. 1173	Matt Wilkinson (2009–2012)	David Bedella (2012–2021)
Luke	A green Irish narrow gauge saddle tank engine who works primarily at the Blue Mountain Quarry on the Skarloey Railway.	'Peter Pan', a 'Wren' class locomotive	Michael Legge	
Millie	A blue French narrow gauge well tank engine who helps run Sir Robert Norramby's Estate Railway at Ulfstead Castle. Her duties include assisting the groundskeeper and taking visitors on tours of the estate. For this, she has her own set of open-topped coaches.	Decauville No. 8069 Tabamar	Miranda Raison (2013–2019); Teresa Gallagher (2015)	

=== Non-rail vehicles ===
Name	Description	Based on	Voiced by (UK)	Voiced by (US)
Cranky	A green tower crane who works at Brendam Docks.	Tower Crane	Matt Wilkinson (2010–2020); Will Harrison-Wallace (2021–2025); Karim Kronfli (2026–present)	Glenn Wrage (2010–2020); Cory Doran (2021–2025); Karim Kronfli (2026–present)
Butch	A yellow and navy blue breakdown vehicle who is part of the Sodor Search and Rescue Team, along with Belle, Flynn, Harold, Rocky and Captain.		Rupert Degas (2011); Matt Wilkinson (2012–2016)	Glenn Wrage (2011–2012); Steven Kynman (2013–2016)
Elizabeth	A vintage steam lorry owned by Sir Topham Hatt who likes to believe roads are better than railways.	Sentinel DG4		
Jeremy	A jet plane who lives at his home base of Sodor Airport. He enjoys being able to do things that the steam engines can only dream of.			
Madge	A green and cream snub-nosed lorry with a three-wheeled cab and a flatbed. She has a motherly attitude towards the Skarloey engines and is often eager to pleaseso much that she forgets her own priorities.	1964 Scammell Scarab		
Kevin	A yellow mobile crane who works at the Sodor Steamworks alongside Victor. His catchphrase is "It was a slip of the hook!"	Ransomes & Rapier crane	Matt Wilkinson (2009–2018); Kerry Shale (2017–2019)	Kerry Shale
Captain	A coast guard lifeboat who is part of the Search and Rescue Team along with Belle, Flynn, Harold, Rocky, and Butch.		Keith Wickham	
Owen	An incline traction engine who is stationed at the Blue Mountain Quarry. Owen moves trucks up and down the slope. Lively Owen faces each job with cheery enthusiasm.		Ben Small (2012–2014) Rob Rackstraw (2020)	
Merrick	A sleepy, snoring gantry crane who works at the Blue Mountain Quarry. When he has nothing to do, he sleeps peacefully. It is not quite so peaceful for anyone who has to listen to his snoring.		Matt Wilkinson (2012–2020)	
Carly	A yellow rolling gantry crane who works at Brendam Docks with Cranky and Big Mickey. In the All Engines Go reboot series she is depicted as a crane engine who lives and works on the Island of Sodor. She is close friends with Sandy and works with her at their maintenance yard.	Four-link portal harbour crane	Lucy Montgomery (2017–2020); Eva Mohamed (2021–2025)	Lucy Montgomery (2017–2020); Jenna Warren (All Engines Go)
Stefano	A huge amphibious cargo ship from Sicily, Italy. A constant globe-trotter, his job is to ship goods to Italian coastal settlements with no room for conventional ports, using his crane to transfer loads to nearby railway lines. He can run on both water and land.	LARC-LX	Antonio Magro	

==== Sodor Construction Company ====
Name	Description	Based on	Voiced by (UK)	Voiced by (US)
Nelson	A ballast tractor who works for the Sodor Construction Company hauling construction workers and members of the Pack to and from work.	1947 Scammell 15LA ballast tractor 1927 Scammell Pioneer tractor unit		
Jack	A friendly and enthusiastic front loader who works for the Sodor Construction Company. He was intended to be the main character of the spin-off.	A Nuffield tractor and an International 454 tractor	Steven Kynman	David Menkin
Alfie	A little green excavator who works for the Sodor Construction Company. He is Jack's best friend and his favourite expression is "More help means more dirt; more dirt means more fun!"	Alfie is a freelance design, but resembles a 1960 K1C10&K excavator	Nathan Clarke (2015–2016); Tom Stourton (2019–2020)	
Oliver	A wise, kind, and hard-working brown crawler excavator who works for the Sodor Construction Company.	Oliver was a freelance design of an excavator, but his exact basis was unknown	Tim Whitnall	
Max and Monty	Devious and troublesome red dump truck twins who work for the Sodor Construction Company.	1949 Scammell Mountaineer 4-wheel drive dump truck	Tim Whitnall (Max); Rasmus Hardiker (Monty)	Kerry Shale (Max); Rob Rackstraw (Monty)
Byron	A giant bulldozer with a big blade belonging to the Sodor Construction Company.	Late-1930s Caterpillar bulldozer		
Ned	A steam shovel who works for the Sodor Construction Company.	Brownings Steam Shovel		
Isobella	A steam lorry who works for the Sodor Construction Company and looks almost identical to Elizabeth.	Sentinel GD4 lorry Sentinel TDG steam tractor		
Patrick	A cement mixer truck who works for the Sodor Construction Company.	1943 Mack NM3		
Brenda	A bulldozer who works for the Sodor Construction Company.	Caterpillar D9	Teresa Gallagher	
Buster	A simple steamroller who goes about his job with glee, pride, and content. He looks almost identical to George and works for the Sodor Construction Company.	Aveling & Porter R10 steamroller		
Darcy	A tunnel boring machine who works for the Sodor Construction Company. In All Engines Go: The Mystery of Lookout Mountain, she works in the mines underneath Lookout Mountain.	Roadheader STR series tunnel boring machine	Harriet Kershaw (2019); Jessica Carroll (2022–2024)	Harriet Kershaw (2019); Dana Puddicombe (2022–2024)

=== Humans ===
==== Hatt family ====
Name	Description	Voiced by (UK)	Voiced by (US)
Dowager Hatt	Sir Topham and Sir Lowham's elderly mother, Lady Topham's mother-in-law, and Stephen and Bridget's great-grandmother.	Keith Wickham	
Sir Lowham Hatt	The jolly twin brother of Sir Topham Hatt.	Keith Wickham	Kerry Shale

==== Recurring ====
Name	Description	Voiced by (UK)	Voiced by (US)
Farmer Finney	The driver of Terence and the owner of a battery farm near Hackenbeck, his name was revealed in the 1996 annual story "James Gets Cracking".	Keith Wickham	
Farmer McColl	Lives and works on a farm in the countryside with many animals, including cows, chickens, sheep, and pigs. Sometimes when there's bad weather on the island he needs help from engines like Toby, Emily, and Trevor to keep his animals safe and healthy.	Matt Wilkinson (2009–2021); Rory Barnett (2026–present)	Kerry Shale (2009–2021); Rory Barnett (2026–present)
Farmer Trotter	The owner and operator of a pig farm, he also keeps beehives, has been known to herd sheep, and according to a magazine article also keeps cows and chickens and grows carrots and potatoes. Jem Cole, Terence, and Trevor sometimes work on his farm.	Matt Wilkinson	Kerry Shale
Old Bailey	A fogman and the current stationmaster of the Hawin Lake, he also works at the Blue Mountain Quarry.	Matt Wilkinson	Kerry Shale
Cyril	A fogman who lives on Sodor in an old cottage in Misty Valley, putting detonators on the tracks to warn the engines about fog. At one stage he was replaced by a foghorn but saved the day when the foghorn caused a landslide and made Thomas crash. Cyril was soon given the job back.	Kerry Shale	
Jenny Packard	An Irish woman affectionately known as Miss Jenny who is the owner and leader of the Sodor Construction Company. She often works closely with the railways and her machines.	Harriet Kershaw	
Allicia Botti	A famous opera singer from Italy who Thomas is chosen to take to her concert. Posters of her concerts are seen throughout the show.	Jules de Jongh	
Sodor Brass Band	Musicians who come to Sodor to perform wherever they are needed, such as at Lady Hatt's birthday party. The Band consists of 6 people playing instruments like the trumpet, trombone, and the tuba, and the engines transport them and really enjoy their tunes. They also play music for the Sodor Circus.	Keith Wickham	
The Duke and Duchess of Boxford	They semi-regularly visit Sodor and have their own private engine, Spencer. On his first visit to Sodor he boasted to Gordon but then ran out of water on Gordon's Hill. The Duke and Duchess later bought a holiday home on the Island and had Edward take their furniture wagon, beating Spencer to the house. The Duke and Duchess visit quite regularly to see the railway.	Matt Wilkinson (Duke); Teresa Gallagher (Duchess)	William Hope (Duke); Jules de Jongh (Duchess)
Lord Callan	The Scottish-born lord of Callan Castle and nearby surrounding land.	Keith Wickham	
Mr. Peregrine Percival	Also known as "The Thin Controller" to the engines, he is the controller of the Skarloey Railway and is often found on his bike. In the US version he is sometimes referred to as the Narrow Gauge Controller. In the 10th, 11th, and 12th series he is featured with his wife, Polly, and their twins Patrick and Pansy.	Keith Wickham	Kerry Shale
Mr. Bubbles (Note: Also known as "Kuffy" or "Mr. Giggles".)	A clown who is famous for blowing very big bubbles and performing with very large balloons.	Keith Wickham	Michael Brandon
Captain Joe	Skiff's present owner and the lighthouse keeper at Arlesburgh Harbour. Following Sailor John's arrest, Captain Joe bought and still owns Skiff.	Matt Wilkinson	
Charubala	The controller of the Indian Railway.	Sheena Bhattessa	
Dame Bella Canto	A famous Italian opera singer.	Flaminia Cinque	
Ruth	An inventor who brings technology to the fair on Sodor.	Dominique Moore	
Baz and Bernie	Two criminals from the Mainland who visit the Technology Fair, intending to use their engine Sonny to steal one of the inventions for their profit.	Bob Golding (Baz); Rob Rackstraw (Bernie)	

==== DVD live-action segments ====
Name	Description	Played by
Mr. Arkwright	A driver who works on Sodor and assists Sir Topham Hatt. Arkwright presents live-action segments between the stories in which he instructs viewers how to help him in a project, such as creating an engine out of cardboard boxes for Sir Topham Hatt's grandchildren. His office is located in the engine drivers' locker room at Knapford Station where portraits of Sir Topham Hatt and the engines are displayed.	Robert Slade
Mr. Gilbert Perkins	A driver who works on Sodor and is a good friend of Sir Topham Hatt. He has appeared in between stories on DVDs since 2010, showing the viewers how to make a cake that looks just like Thomas or dressing up to reading stories. In other appearances he was shown reading The Railway Series stories to the viewers and writing postcards in Mr. Edwards' signal box. He hosted a version of Down at the Station titled Mr. Perkins' Railway.	Ben Forster

== Introduced in Thomas & Friends: All Engines Go ==
=== Standard gauge ===
==== Steam engines ====
Name	Description	Based on	Voiced by (UK)	Voiced by (US)
Ultratrain	A streamlined steam engine and the protagonist of Thomas's favourite film series. His nemesis is Trainiac. There is also has a comic book series where Ultratrain has a team of super-engine friends called The Carriages of Justice.	Freelance steam engine	Cory Doran (2021); Jai Armstrong (2022)	Cory Doran (2021–2022)
Trainiac	The antagonist of Thomas's favourite film series and the nemesis of Ultratrain.	Freelance steam engine	Cory Doran (2021); Jai Armstrong (2022)	Cory Doran (2021–2022)

==== Diesel engines ====
Name	Description	Based on	Voiced by (UK)	Voiced by (US)
Sandy	A pink railroad speeder who lives and works on the Island of Sodor. She is close friends with Carly and works with her at their maintenance yard, sharing the railway's repair duties.	Rail Speeder	Holly Dixon	Glee Dango

==== Electric engines ====
Name	Description	Based on	Voiced by (UK)	Voiced by (US)
Kana	A bullet train who lives and works on the North Western Railway and the first bullet train to live on Sodor. She has two passenger coaches painted in the same livery as her and loves to race. She often creates gusts of wind due to her speed but sometimes has trouble with burning out her batteries.	E8 Series Shinkansen	Chloe Raphael	Ava Ro
Farona and Frederico	A pair of yellow and black electric engines from Spain. The pair visited the Island of Sodor to compete for the seventy-seventh Sodor Cup. The two are arrogant, snobbish and very unsporting even resorted to cheating to try and win.	Freelance electric engines	Farona: Humberly Gonzalez (2021); Jessica Carroll (2022); Ferderico: Thomas Santoro (2021); Matt Coles (2022)	Farona: Jessica Carroll (2021–2022); Ferderico: Matt Coles (2021–2022)
Riff and Jiff	A pair of red electric engine twins who visited the Island of Sodor to compete for the seventy-seventh Sodor Cup. It is also mentioned that they won the All Around the World Race the year before. The two are cheerful engines who act very friendly towards other competitors alike.	Alstom Coradia LINT 27 railcar	Riff: Addison Holley (2021); Jessica Carroll (2022–2023); Jiff: Evany Rosen (2021); Jessica Carroll (2022–2023)	Riff: Addison Holley (2021–2023); Jiff: Evany Rosen (2021–2023)

==== Rolling stock ====
Name	Description	Based on	Voiced by (UK)	Voiced by (US)
Bruno	An autistic brake car with a significant knowledge of the railway's schedules and routes as well as a fondness for humans.	North American caboose	Elliott Garcia	Chuck Smith (2021–2025); Elliott Garcia (2026present)

==== Non-rail vehicles ====
Name	Description	Based on	Voiced by (UK)	Voiced by (US)	
Tess	North Western Railway	A teal rolling portal crane who works at Kellsthorpe Wharf. Tess is very troublesome and impatient, she does not like it when others show up late or do not work as fast as she does.	Four-link portal harbour crane	Celeste Waldron	Kaia Oz

=== Humans ===
Name	Description	Voiced by (UK)	Voiced by (US)
Grandmother Hatt	The grandmother of Sir Topham Hatt, who would reminisce the times when her house smelled like cinnamon pastries.	N/A	

==== Recurring ====
Name	Description	Based on	Voiced by (UK)	Voiced by (US)
Reginald	A baker who owns a popular bakery-café located in Peel Godred. Reginald also prectices opera and once sang a note that was so loud and high-pitched that it broke glass across Sodor.	Alice Murphy (2025)	Linda Kash (2025	

== Introduced in Thomas & Friends: Railway Stories ==
=== Non-rail vehicles ===
Name	Description	Based on	Voiced by
Deepak	An easy-going yellow mobile crane who mainly works at Knapford Harbour, unloading cargo from ships, but will help out his friends if they need it.	Mobile crane	Nanak Phlora
