= Fletcher, Jennings & Co. =

Engineering company in England

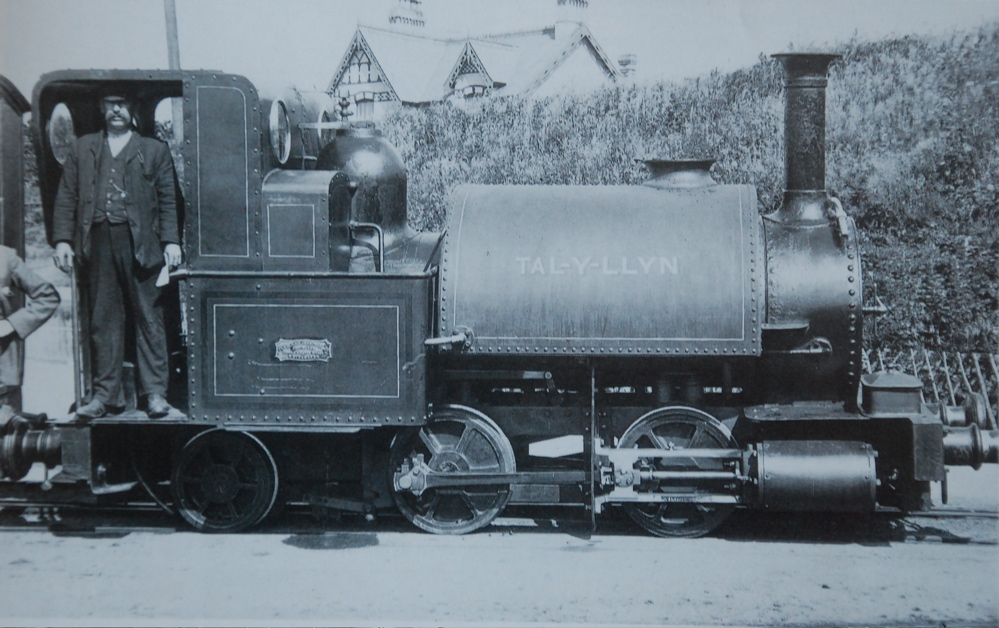
Talyllyn at the Talyllyn Railway in 1904

Fletcher, Jennings & Co. was an engineering company at Lowca near Whitehaven, Cumberland, England.

== Overview ==
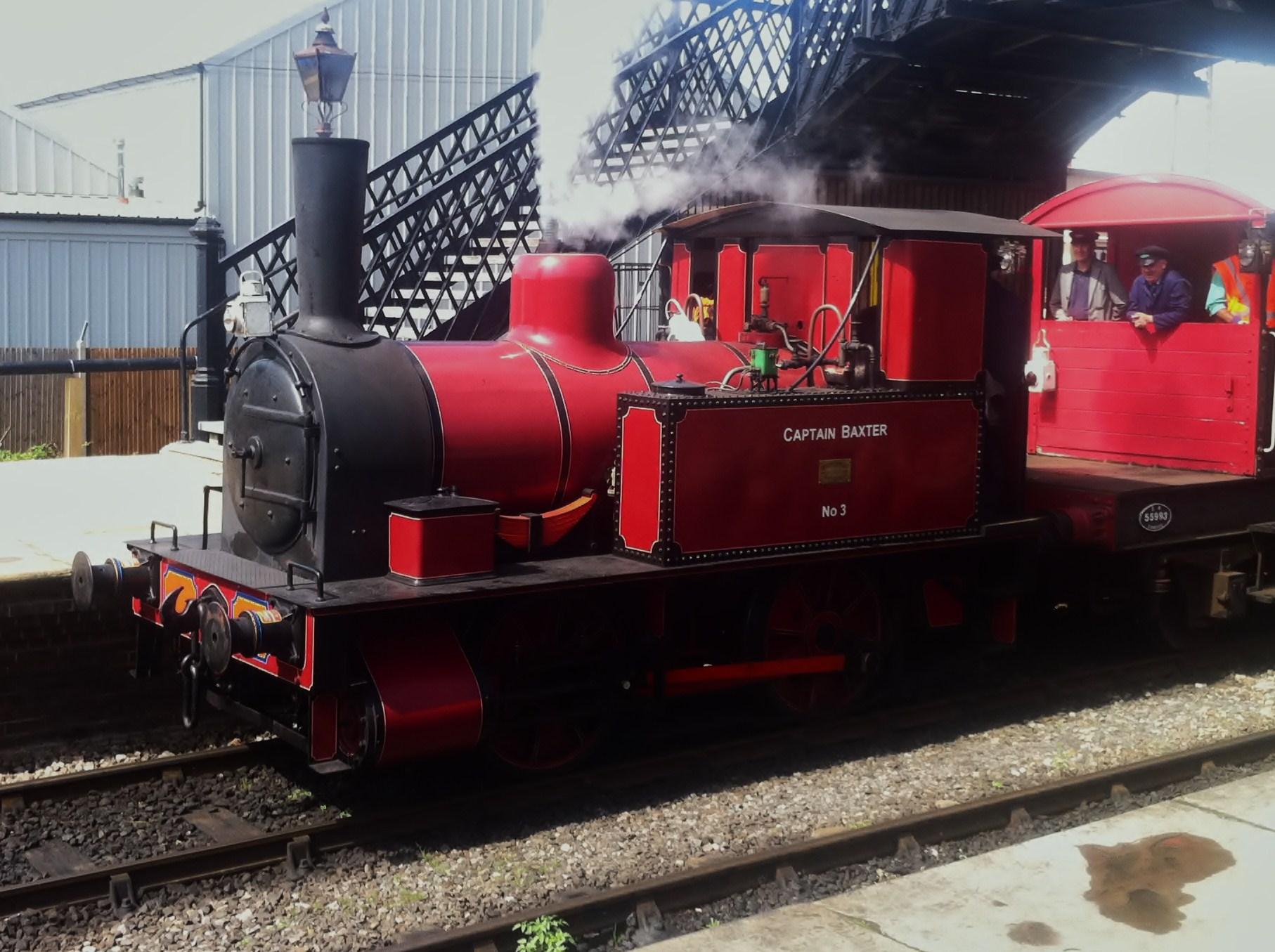
Fletcher Jennings locomotive Captain Baxter at Sheffield Park Station on the Bluebell Railway

Fletcher and Jennings took over the business of Tulk and Ley in 1857. From then, until 1884, the company concentrated on four and six-coupled industrial tank locomotives, although other goods such as bridge girders, and blast-furnace shells for the burgeoning local iron industry, were also produced. By then nearly two hundred locomotives had been built and the company acquired limited liability as Lowca Engineering Company Ltd.

In 1905, the name changed again to the New Lowca Engineering Company Ltd., but the company was receiving fewer orders. After a disastrous fire in 1912, all production ceased and the company being finally wound up in 1927.

== Surviving locomotives ==
Preserved locomotives manufactured by the company include:

Name	Gauge	Type	Build date	Withdrawn	Works number	Notes
Talyllyn	2 ft 3 in (686 mm)	0-4-2ST	1864		42	Preserved on the Talyllyn Railway in mid Wales
Dolgoch	2 ft 3 in (686 mm)	0-4-0WT	1866	-	63	Preserved on the Talyllyn Railway in mid Wales
Sten Sture	2 ft 9 in (838 mm)	0-6-0ST	1873	-	119	Rebuilt to Side Tank form. Located in Sweden.
Captain Baxter	4 ft 8 1/2 in (1,435 mm)	0-4-0T	1877	-	158	Preserved on the Bluebell Railway in Sussex
Townsend Hook	3 ft 2 1/4 in (972 mm)	0-4-0T	1880	1952	172L	Preserved at Amberley Museum & Heritage Centre in Sussex.
William Finlay	3 ft 2 1/4 in (972 mm)	0-4-0T	1880	-	173L	Bought by the Narrow Gauge Railway Museum in Tywyn, Gwynedd in 2016 for display.
Hariette	3 ft (914 mm)	0-4-2T	1883	-	190	Located in Mauritius
Regina	3 ft (914 mm)	0-4-2T	1889	-	204	Located in Mauritius
-	3 ft (914 mm)	0-4-2T	1890	-	207	Located in Mauritius

== Other locomotives ==
Other locomotives manufactured by the company include:

- Brigham Hall/Rothersyke of the Cleator & Workington junction railway

== In fiction ==
The fictional locomotives Skarloey, Rheneas and Smudger from The Railway Series and Thomas and Friends, were built by Fletcher, Jennings & Co. (being the twins of Talyllyn and Dolgoch, respectively). Captain Baxter also made an appearance in Railway Series book 18 Stepney the "Bluebell" Engine.

Captain Baxter appeared in the movie Muppets Most Wanted, modified to look like an old American locomotive and renamed to "Randy Stevenot No.3".

== Sources ==
- Kyle, Ian "Steam from Lowca" (1974)
- Wear, Russell "Some further notes on the Lowca Works", Cumbrian Railways, Feb 2002
- Coulls, Anthony (July 2016). The Lowca Legacy. Holne Publishing.
