= Dolgoch (locomotive) =

Preserved British steam locomotive

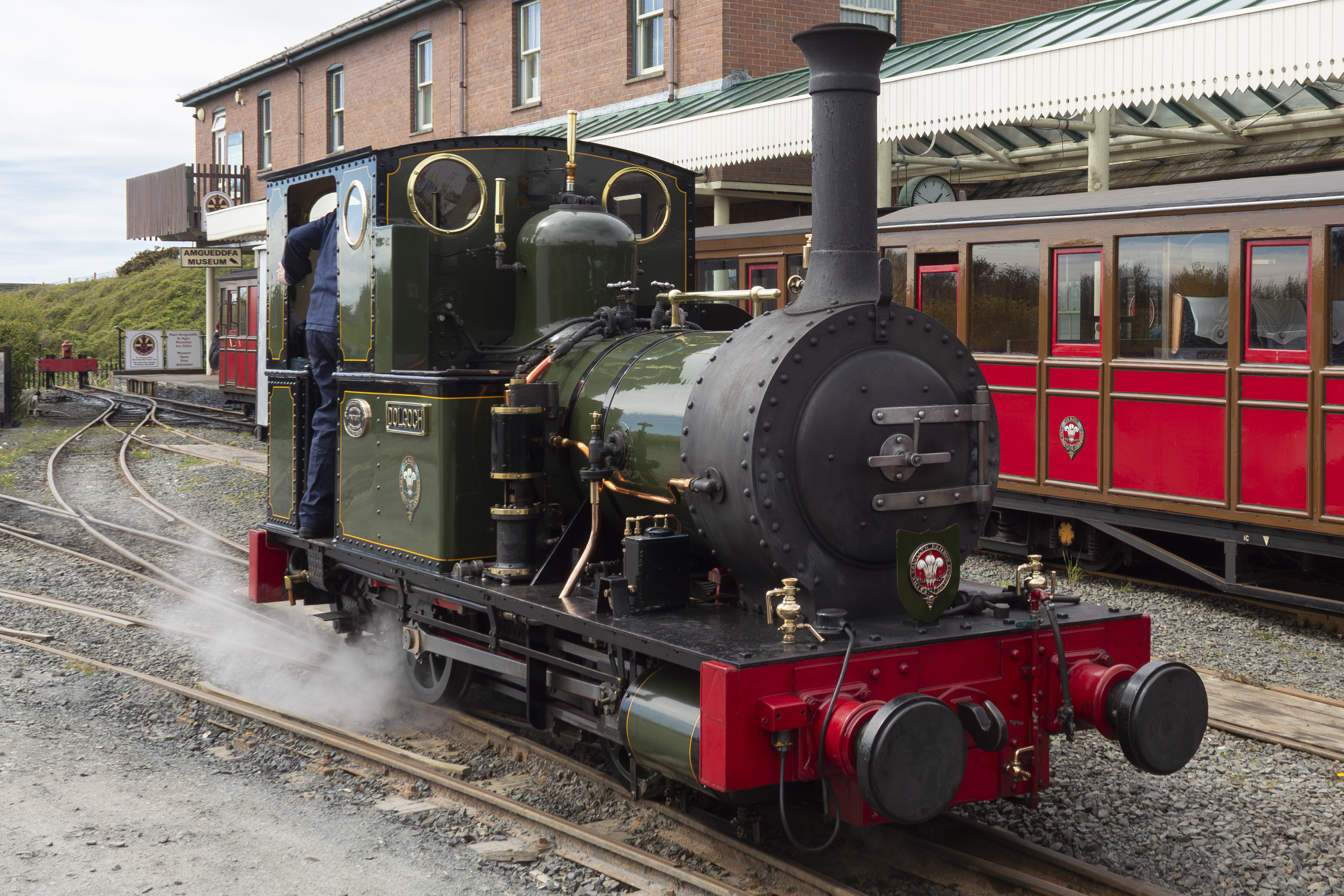
- Dolgoch at Tywyn Wharf in 2024
Type and origin
- Power type: Steam
- Builder: Fletcher, Jennings & Co.
- Serial number: 63
- Model: Class Bb
- Build date: 1866
- Total produced: 1
Specifications
- Configuration
  - Whyte: 0-4-0WT
- Gauge: 2 ft 3 in (686 mm)
- Driver dia.: 2 ft 4 in (711 mm)
- Wheelbase: 6 ft 6 in (1.98 m)
- Length: 17 ft 5 in (5.31 m)
- Loco weight: 10 long tons 5 hundredweight (11.5 short tons; 10.4 t)
- Boiler pressure: 150 lbf/in^{2} (1.03 MPa)
- Cylinders: Two, outside
- Cylinder size: 7 5/8 in × 16 in (194 mm × 406 mm)
Performance figures
- Tractive effort: 4,236 lbf (18.84 kN)
Career
- Operators: Talyllyn Railway
- Numbers: 2

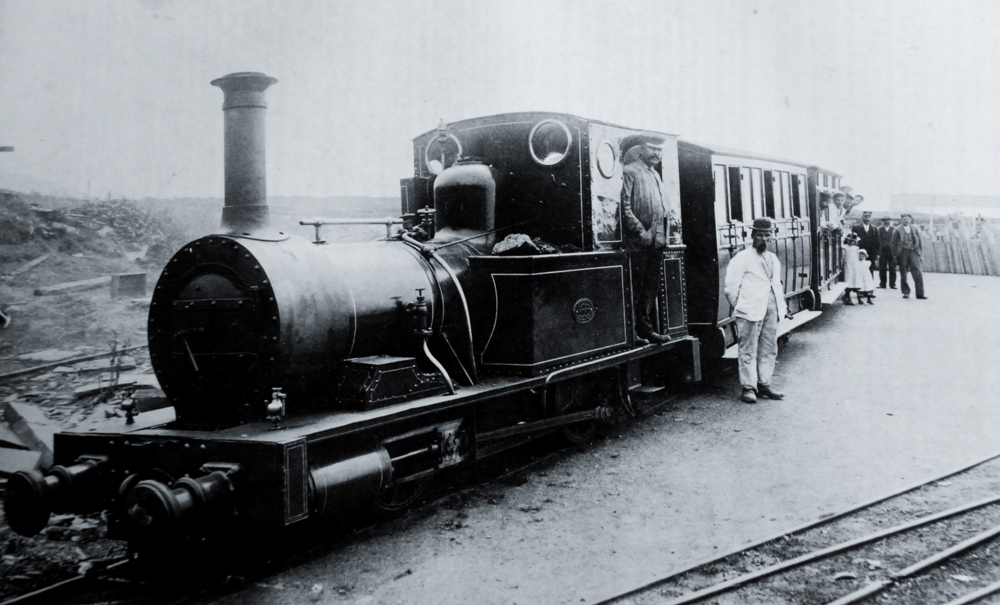
No 2 Dolgoch at Tywyn Wharf station around 1900. The locomotive is carrying the name "Pretoria"

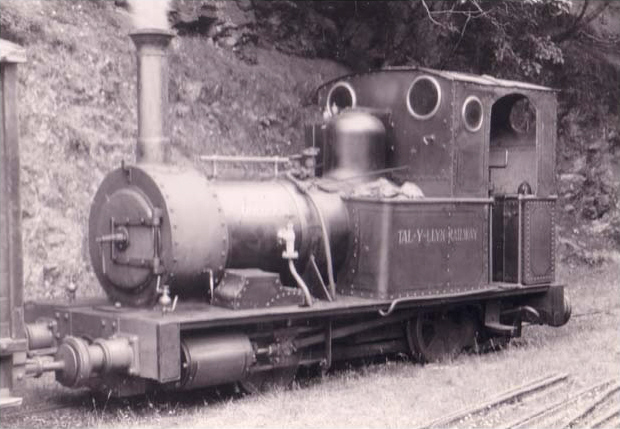
Dolgoch in 1951

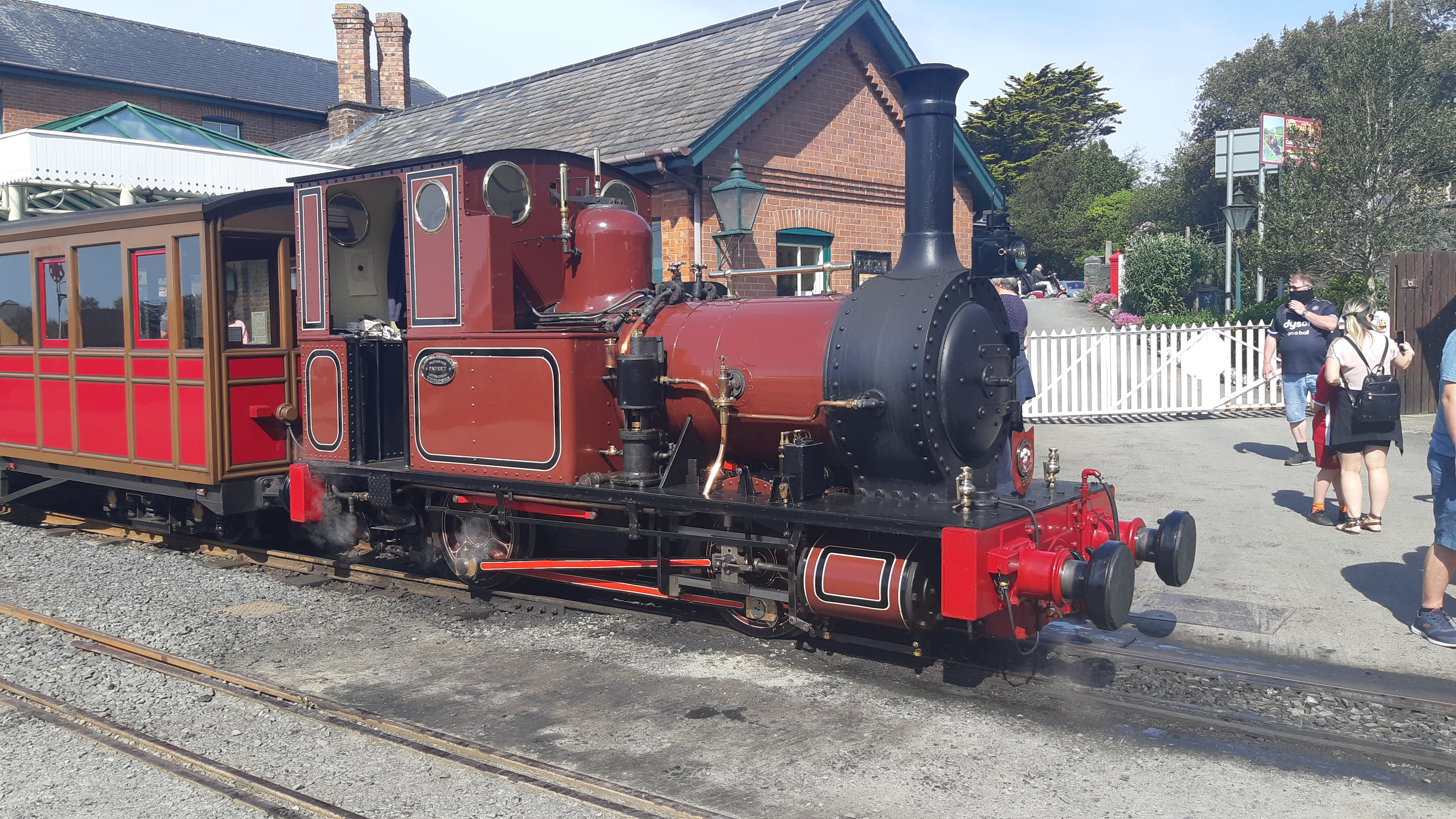
Dolgoch in 2021

Dolgoch (Note: Welsh pronunciation: [doːlgoːχ]) is a narrow gauge 0-4-0WT steam locomotive. It was built by Fletcher, Jennings & Co. and is one of the oldest locomotives still in active service. It was delivered to the Talyllyn Railway in 1866 and continues to run on this railway to this day.

Dolgoch was the only serviceable locomotive on the Talyllyn Railway when it was preserved by volunteers in 1951 and kept the railway running during this time.

== Design ==
The design is unusual for an 0-4-0. It has a long wheelbase for its gauge and the driving axle is behind the firebox in a layout similar to a Crampton locomotive. This prevents the use of a conventional valve gear layout which is driven from the rear axle. Instead, the Allan valve gear is driven from the leading coupled axle and doubled back to connect to the valve rods. Dolgoch has two water tanks - the main well tank between the frames and a smaller back tank at the rear of the cab.

== History ==
The locomotive was renamed Pretoria between about 1900 and 1914 in celebration of the relief of the township of Pretoria in South Africa by Lord Roberts during the Boer War. It then reverted to the original name Dolgoch. For most of the Railway's life, names were painted only on the North side of the locomotives. Polished brass nameplates have only been carried in preservation.

In early 1945, Dolgoch was sent to the Atlas Foundry in Shrewsbury to be overhauled. At this time the railway's only other locomotive, Talyllyn, was so worn out it could not be safely operated and services on the railway were suspended. Dolgoch returned to service in September 1945, with new displacement cylinder lubricators mounted on each side of the smokebox, a new chimney, repaired inner firebox and a retubed boiler.

Around 1949, Dolgoch's boiler was patched, and on 26 August 1949, Dolgoch cracked its frame in an accident, which resulted in its driver being dismissed from the company. Dolgoch was the only operable locomotive from 1945 until 1952, when Edward Thomas was restored for use.

Between 1954 and 1963, Dolgoch underwent a major overhaul.

== In fiction ==
The fictional locomotive Rheneas in The Railway Series by the Rev. W. Awdry is based on Dolgoch.

== Bibliography ==
- Boyd, James I.C. (1988). The Talyllyn Railway. WildSwan Publications. ISBN 0906867460.
- Rolt, L.T.C. (1953). Railway Adventure. Constable/David and Charles/Pan.
