= Talyllyn (locomotive) =

Welsh narrow gauge steam locomotive

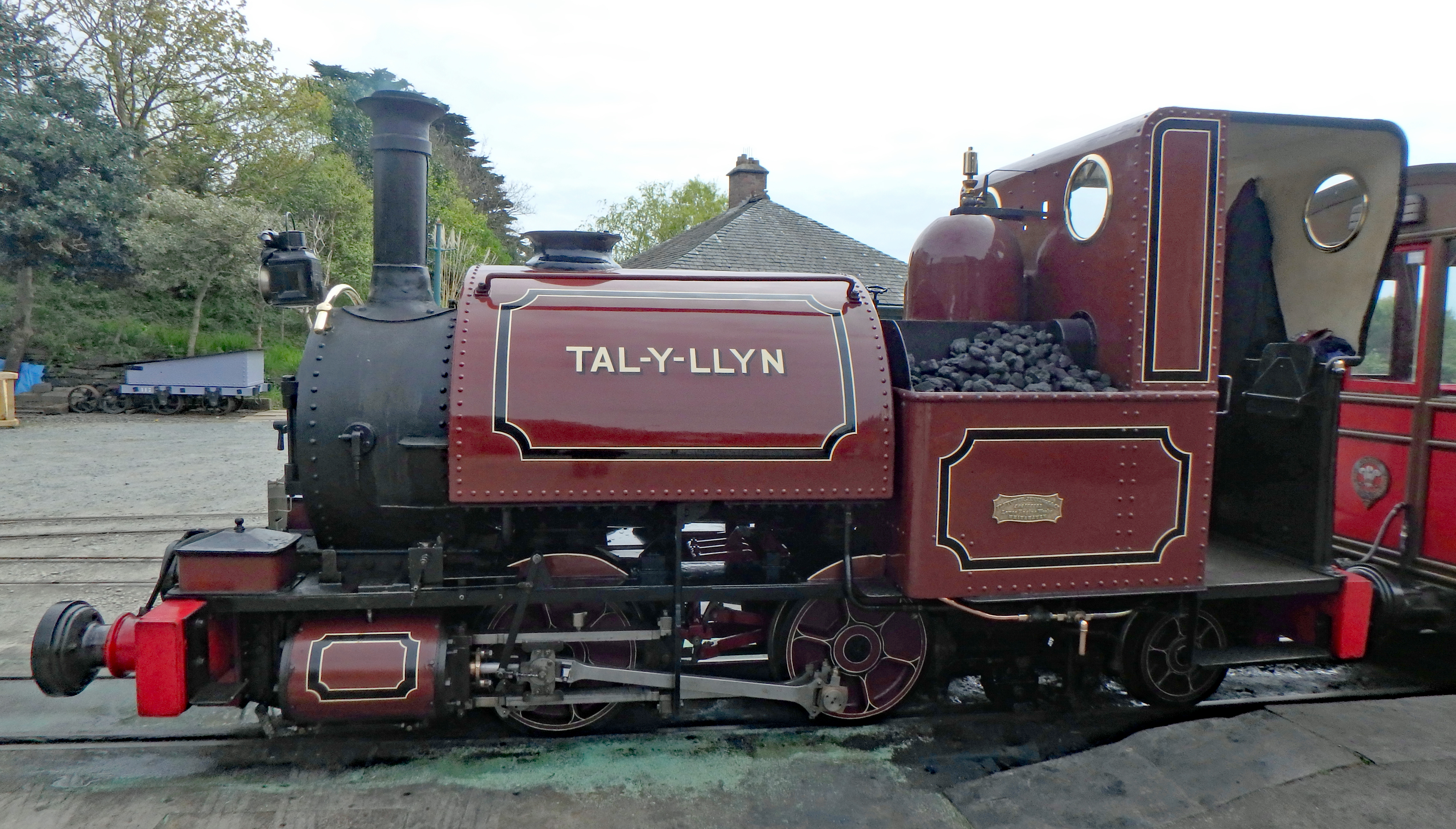
- Talyllyn at Tywyn Wharf Station in 2017
Type and origin
- Power type: Steam
- Builder: Fletcher, Jennings & Co.
- Serial number: 42
- Model: Class C
- Build date: 1864
- Total produced: 1
Specifications
- Configuration
  - Whyte: 0-4-0ST, later 0-4-2ST
- Gauge: 2 ft 3 in (686 mm)
- Driver dia.: 2 ft 4 in (711 mm)
- Trailing dia.: 1 ft 9 in (533 mm)
- Wheelbase: Coupled: 4 ft 0 in (1.22 m); Loco: 9 ft 0 in (2.74 m)
- Length: 18 ft 0.5 in (5.50 m)
- Loco weight: 12 long tons 0 cwt (26,900 lb or 12.2 t); 13.4 short tons
- Boiler pressure: 160 lbf/in^{2} (1.10 MPa)
- Cylinders: Two, outside
- Cylinder size: 8 5/8 in × 16 in (219 mm × 406 mm)
Performance figures
- Tractive effort: 5,780 lbf (25.71 kN)
Career
- Operators: Talyllyn Railway
- Numbers: 1

Talyllyn (Note: Welsh pronunciation: [taləˈɬɪn]) is a narrow gauge steam locomotive. It was built by Fletcher, Jennings & Co. in 1864 and is one of the oldest locomotives still in active service. It was delivered to the Talyllyn Railway on 24 September 1864 and continues to run on the railway.

== History ==
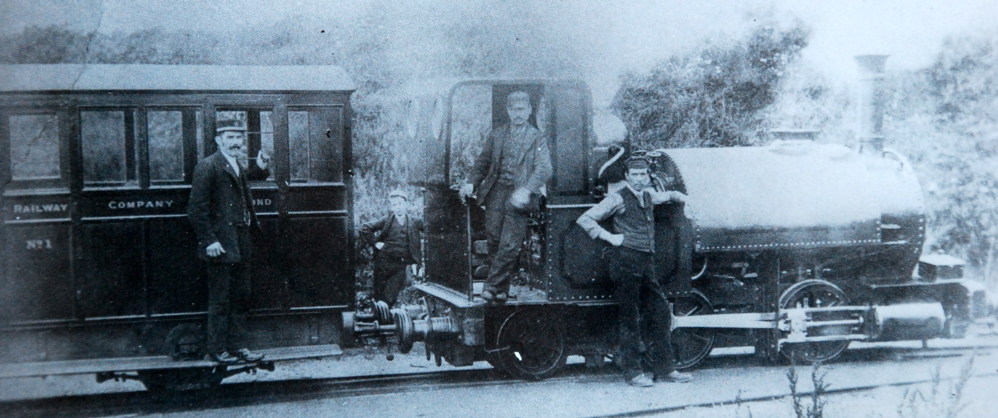
One of the earliest photos of Talyllyn taken before 1895 and showing its original saddle tank.

The Talyllyn Railway ordered two locomotives for its opening in 1865, Talyllyn and Dolgoch. Both were built by Fletcher, Jennings & Co. of Whitehaven, although to two very different designs. Talyllyn was the first order the company had delivered to north Wales and the first narrow gauge locomotive they had built with plate frames. It was built to the company's C Class design, although it was the first member of its class to be built to a gauge less than 2 ft 8 in (813 mm).

The engine was originally delivered as a 0-4-0ST with an open cab. Early tests on the railway showed that the short wheelbase led to unacceptable vertical oscillation, and in January 1867 Talyllyn was returned to its manufacturer and fitted with a pair of trailing wheels, converting it into an 0-4-2ST. Unusually, the trailing axle was fixed rigidly to the frame, resulting in an overall wheelbase of 8 ft (2.4 m). Most 0-4-2 locomotives have trailing wheels that can swivel independently of the frame to go around corners more easily. To accommodate the long wheelbase, the railway's gauge was increased marginally to between 2 ft 3.5 in (698 mm) and 2 ft 4 in (710 mm). A cab was subsequently fitted in the railway's workshops at Pendre.

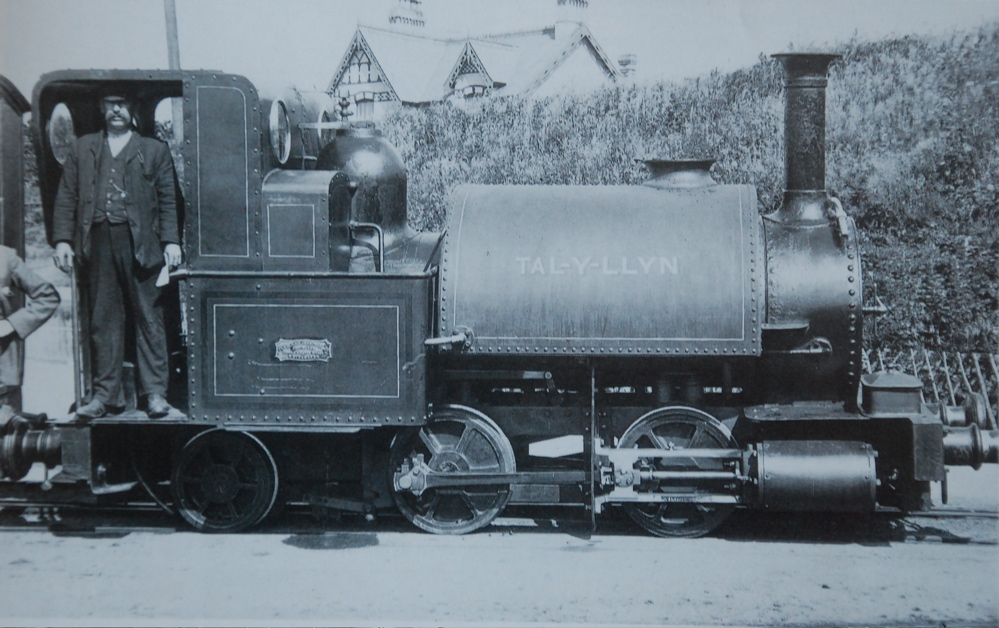
Talyllyn at Tywyn Wharf station in 1904

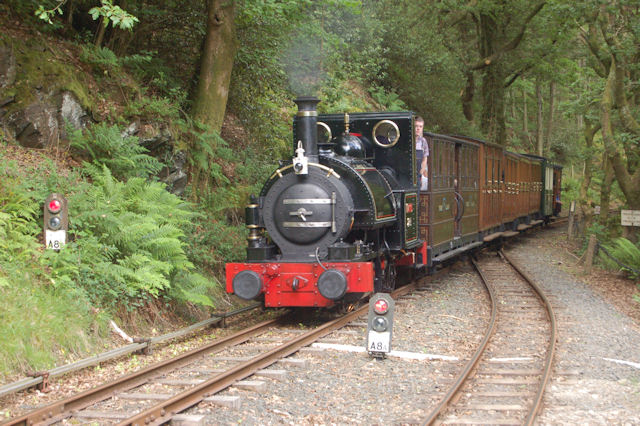
Talyllyn approaches Abergynolwyn in 2010, carrying a black livery

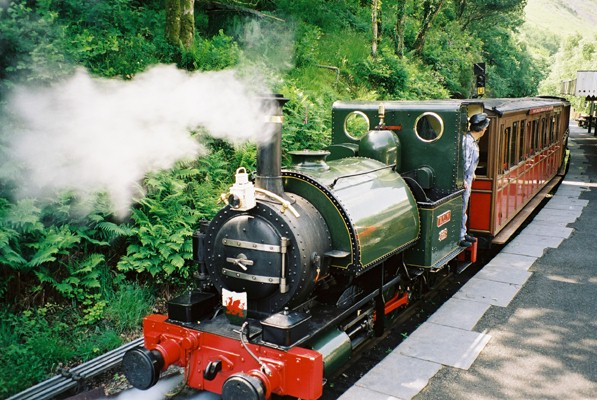
Talyllyn at Abergynolwyn Station in 1999, carrying a green livery

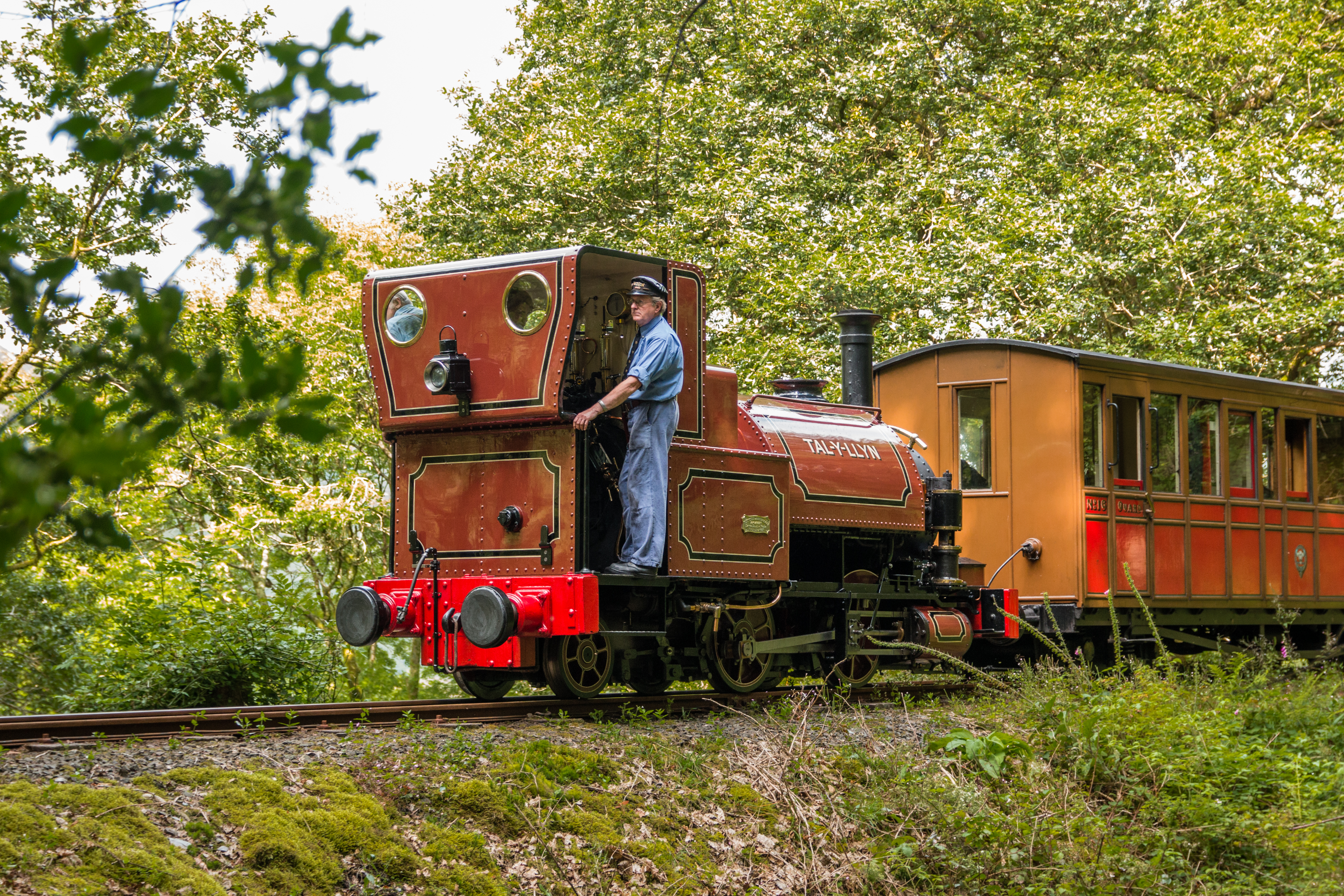
Talyllyn wearing original livery

The locomotive was returned to Fletcher Jennings for a second time around 1900, although the reason for this visit is not recorded. Repairs and improvements were also made at Pendre over the years, including alterations to the cab, fitting of a footplate at the front of locomotive and of a sandbox. A new set of frames supplied by W. G. Bagnall's was also fitted at Pendre, again around 1900.

Talyllyn remained in service for most of the original railway's existence. By World War II it had fallen into a very poor state of repair, as it was the more popular of the two locomotives and was used more frequently. It was retired in 1945 when its boiler and firebox were found to be degraded beyond further repair. At that time the locomotive was still carrying its original 1864 boiler.

== Preservation ==
Following the rescue of the Talyllyn Railway in 1951, Talyllyn was inspected and found to be beyond economic repair. However, as the railway's fortunes improved, it became possible to consider a major overhaul. In 1957 the locomotive was sent away to the Gibbons Brothers' Brierley Hill engineering works at Lenches Bridge in Pensnett for a complete renewal. A new boiler, saddletank and bunker were built and Talyllyn returned to service in 1958.

== Models ==
Narrow gauge railway modellers have had the option of Talyllyn in 16 mm scale live steam by Accucraft UK in three historic liveries as well as HOn30 (OO9 as it is known to the UK) recently released by Bachmann of the USA.

== In fiction ==
=== The Railway Series ===
In August 1952, Wilbert Awdry, and his family visited the Talyllyn Railway. This inspired him to introduce the character Skarloey in The Railway Series, based on the locomotive Talyllyn.
