= LMS Kitson 0-4-0ST =

Class of British steam locomotives

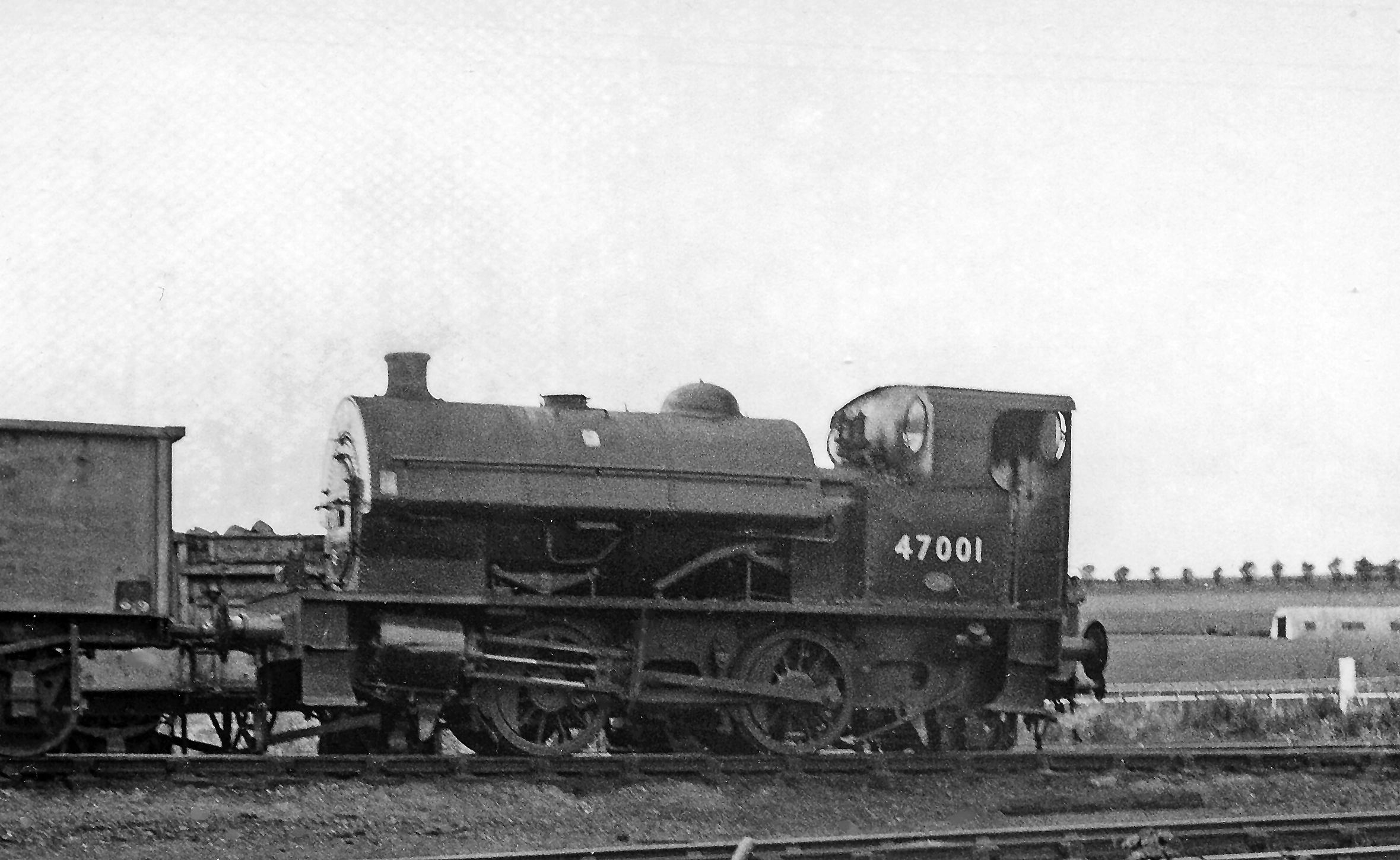
- No. 47001 at Barrow Hill (Staveley) Locomotive Depot 23 August 1963.
Type and origin
- Power type: Steam
- Builder: Kitson & Co. (5); BR Horwich Works (5)
- Serial number: Kitson 5644–5648
- Build date: 1932 (5), 1953–54 (5)
- Total produced: 10
Specifications
- Configuration
  - Whyte: 0-4-0ST
  - UIC: B n2t
- Gauge: 4 ft 8 1/2 in (1,435 mm) standard gauge
- Driver dia.: 3 ft 10 in (1.168 m)
- Wheelbase: 7 ft 6 in (2.29 m)
- Length: 26 ft 4 1/4 in (8.03 m)
- Loco weight: 33 long tons (34 t; 37 short tons) (7000–7004), 34.8 long tons (35.4 t; 39.0 short tons) (7005–7009)
- Fuel type: Coal
- Fuel capacity: 1 long ton (1.02 t; 1.12 short tons) (7000–7004), 2 long tons (2.03 t; 2.24 short tons) (7005–7009)
- Water cap.: 800 imp gal (3,600 L; 960 US gal)
- Firebox
  - Grate area: 11 3/4 sq ft (1.09 m^{2})
- Boiler: LMS type J3
- Boiler pressure: 160 lbf/in^{2} (1.10 MPa)
- Heating surface
  - Firebox: 57 sq ft (5.3 m^{2})
  - Tubes: 603 sq ft (56.0 m^{2})
- Superheater: None
- Cylinders: Two, outside
- Cylinder size: 15 1/2 in × 20 in (394 mm × 508 mm)
Performance figures
- Tractive effort: 14,205 lbf (63.19 kN)
Career
- Operators: London, Midland and Scottish Railway; British Railways
- Power class: 0F
- Withdrawn: 1963–1966
- Disposition: All scrapped

The London, Midland and Scottish Railway (LMS) Kitson 0-4-0ST was a class of 0-4-0ST type steam locomotive designed for light shunting.

== History ==
Five were originally designed and built by Kitson and Company of Leeds to LMS specification in 1932 and numbered 1540–1544. They were similar to other shunters built for industrial use. The manufacturer's works numbers were 5644–5648. The LMS classified them 0F. These were later renumbered 7000–7004 in 1935/1936. British Railways (BR) added 40000 to their numbers after nationalization in 1948, becoming 47000–47004. Between 1953 and 1954, BR constructed an additional five at Horwich Works, numbered 47005–47009. These differed from the original batch having shorter saddle tanks with extra space given to longer coal bunkers instead.

Some saw use on the Cromford and High Peak Railway in Derbyshire. Withdrawals took place between 1963 and 1966, and no examples were preserved.

== Stock list ==
1932 No.	1935 No.	BR No.	Builder	Works No.	Date built	Date withdrawn
1540	7000	47000	Kitson	5644	1932	1966
1541	7001	47001	Kitson	5645	1932	1966
1542	7002	47002	Kitson	5646	1932	1964
1543	7003	47003	Kitson	5647	1932	1964
1544	7004	47004	Kitson	5648	1932	1964
n/a	n/a	47005	Horwich		1953	1966
n/a	n/a	47006	Horwich		1953	1966
n/a	n/a	47007	Horwich		1953	1963
n/a	n/a	47008	Horwich		1953	1964
n/a	n/a	47009	Horwich		1954	1964

== In fiction ==
In The Railway Series books by the Reverend W. Awdry, a character called 'Pug' appears in the 12th book, The Eight Famous Engines. After problems of consistent accuracy of the drawings in the early books, later characters were based more closely on real locomotives. Although not explicitly identified by Awdry, the locomotive in the illustration by John T. Kenney, has been identified as most closely resembling an LMS Kitson 0-4-0ST.
