= Thomas & Friends series 4 =

Season of television series

Thomas & Friends
- Series 4
- DVD cover art
- No. of episodes: 26

Release
- Original network: Cartoon Network UK
- Original release: 4 March – 8 April 1996

Season chronology
- ← Previous; Series 3 Next → Series 5

Thomas the Tank Engine & Friends is a children's television series about the engines and other characters working on the railways of the Island of Sodor, and is based on The Railway Series books written by Wilbert Awdry.

This article lists and details episodes from the fourth series of the show, which was broadcast in 1996. It was produced by Britt Allcroft.

This series was narrated by Michael Angelis for the United Kingdom audiences, with George Carlin narrating the episodes for the United States audiences, on what was also his final series. This was the final series where Thomas appeared in the US as a segment on Shining Time Station; after that, it became a program on Mister Moose's Fun Time and Storytime With Thomas. This was also the final series to be produced before the death of Wilbert Awdry in 1997.

In the UK, episodes 1–3, 6, and 8-11 were first released on VHS with a different take of Michael Angelis' narrations than the later versions on TV and other VHS releases.

== Production ==
=== Filming ===
Filming for Series 4 lasted from June to November 1994. On November 14, the first 8 episodes were released direct-to-video in the UK. On July 3, 1995, the rest of the series was released on 2 other UK VHS releases. Several episodes were also featured on the Shining Time Family Specials, released throughout 1995 in the US. After ending its broadcast run on ITV, the series would make its official UK television debut on March 8, 1996, on Cartoon Network.

The 4th series saw the introduction of the smaller narrow gauge engines. For ease of filming, series 5 would introduce larger-scale versions of the characters, and from series 6, these larger models were used almost exclusively.

=== Stories ===
Half of the third series had consisted of stories written by the show's staff, but only one original story, "Rusty to the Rescue" (written by Allcroft and Mitton), was written for the fourth series. The episodes which used The Railway Series did take some liberties with the source material, in order to fill the runtime and make the stories more accessible. From series 5 onward, all stories would be staff-written, without using the Awdrys' books as a source.

Stepney (a character based on a real-life engine and used to highlight the Preservation Movement in the books) was given an entirely different background when he was introduced. This decision carried on into later series, in which he was seen on either a fictionalized Bluebell Railway or as a member of The Fat Controller's railway.

The show had come under fire for having too few female characters, and a conscious decision was made to rewrite Rusty, who was always a male character in the books, as gender-neutral. Thomas' new owners initially defended the decision, citing Rusty's gender neutrality since Series 4 until series 7. Later episodes substituted male pronouns in reference to Rusty.

=== Talent ===
Initially, each episode was broadcast in installments of the children's television program Shining Time Station. 2 stories from Series 4 were aired in each of the hour-long "Family Specials" in 1995. The rest were broadcast in a 6-episode offshoot called Mr. Conductor's Thomas Tales in 1996. In 1999, they aired in a new half-hour program called Storytime with Thomas, which also included Series 5 episodes narrated by Alec Baldwin and episodes of Britt Allcroft's Magic Adventures of Mumfie.

== Episodes ==
No. overall	No. in series	Title	Directed by	Source	Original release date	Official No.
79	1	"Granpuff"	David Mitton	Duke the Lost Engine by Rev. W. Awdry	4 March 1996 (Note: This episode was first released on the Rock 'N' Roll and other Stories VHS on 7 November 1994.)	401
On a chilly winter's night, Thomas tells the story of Duke, an old narrow gauge tank-tender engine who was admired by a couple younger engines named Stuart and Falcon to the others. However, when his line closed, the old engine was put away in a shed.
80	2	"Sleeping Beauty"	David Mitton	Duke the Lost Engine by Rev. W. Awdry	5 March 1996	402
Thomas continues his story of Duke. Some rescuers went searching for him, but his shed was long since covered. However, knowing that Duke was around, they continued the grand search.
81	3	"Bulldog"	David Mitton	Duke the Lost Engine by Rev. W. Awdry	6 March 1996	403
Falcon (now "Sir Handel") was excited when he was sent to take the Mountain Road with Duke. He did not pay attention to where he was going and winded up dangling from a cliff with Duke holding tight. Falcon later apologized and thanked Duke for saving him.
82	4	"You Can't Win!"	David Mitton	Duke the Lost Engine by Rev. W. Awdry	7 March 1996 (Note: This episode was first released on the Thomas & Stepney and other Stories VHS on 3 July 1995.)	404
Duke wasn't feeling well, and Stuart (now "Peter Sam") teased him for it. Soon, because Duke was too ill to manage on his own, Stuart and Falcon assisted him. But Duke secretly had enough energy to play a trick on Stuart.
83	5	"Four Little Engines"	David Mitton	Four Little Engines by Rev. W. Awdry	8 March 1996	405
83	5	"Four Little Engines"	David Mitton	Based on Skarloey Remembers and Old Faithful	8 March 1996	405
On the Skarloey Railway, the coaches derail Sir Handel, meaning that he is unable to work. Skarloey itches for a good run and his front spring breaks, but he still manages to get the passengers back to the station.
84	6	"A Bad Day for Sir Handel"	David Mitton	Four Little Engines by Rev. W. Awdry	11 March 1996	406
84	6	"A Bad Day for Sir Handel"	David Mitton	Based on Sir Handel	11 March 1996	406
When Skarloey and Rheneas become overworked, Peter Sam and Sir Handel come to help. But Sir Handel is in a bad mood and only makes matters worse for himself.
85	7	"Peter Sam and the Refreshment Lady"	David Mitton	Four Little Engines by Rev. W. Awdry	12 March 1996	407
Peter Sam is pleased running the line on his own after Sir Handel's naughty day, but Henry's "threat" to leave if he is not on time makes him rush, and he accidentally leaves a Refreshment Lady behind.
86	8	"Trucks"	David Mitton	The Little Old Engine by Rev. W. Awdry	13 March 1996	408
86	8	"Rusty Helps Peter Sam" (Note: Rusty to the Rescue & Other Thomas Stories)	David Mitton	The Little Old Engine by Rev. W. Awdry	13 March 1996	408
While Skarloey is being mended, a little diesel called Rusty comes to help. Regardless, Sir Handel does not feel like working, so Gordon suggests he feign illness. However, when Peter Sam is doing Sir Handel's work at the slate quarry, some of the Troublesome Trucks of slate mistake him for Sir Handel and cause Peter Sam's funnel to become loose.
87	9	"Home at Last"	David Mitton	The Little Old Engine by Rev. W. Awdry	14 March 1996	409
Skarloey returns home from being repaired and meets Rusty. Peter Sam tells him about Duncan, a rude and careless engine, whom Skarloey must later rescue from under a crumbling tunnel.
88	10	"Rock 'n' Roll"	David Mitton	The Little Old Engine by Rev. W. Awdry	15 March 1996	410
Duncan is cross about Rusty telling him what to do, even though it is sensible advice. With a tip from James, Duncan is off on his own and causes trouble. He ends up derailing himself much to his own embarrassment. Rusty comes to his aid, and Duncan apologizes for his rudeness.
89	11	"Special Funnel"	David Mitton	Gallant Old Engine by Rev. W. Awdry	18 March 1996	411
Peter Sam's funnel is still in bad condition from his accident with the slate trucks. He has been promised a new funnel, but he starts to lose hope in it, especially when an icicle knocks off his old funnel.
90	12	"Steam Roller"	David Mitton	Gallant Old Engine by Rev. W. Awdry	19 March 1996	412
Sir Handel wants to prove his special set of wheels make him superior, so he agrees to handle George, a grumpy steamroller who hates rails. But he and Sir Handel are too evenly hot-headed, which soon after causes ensuing chaos.
91	13	"Passengers and Polish"	David Mitton	Gallant Old Engine by Rev. W. Awdry	20 March 1996	413
Duncan is very cross when the passengers and the other engines get luxuries instead of him, and doesn't stop complaining. To make matters worse, he stops on the viaduct, which causes confusion and delay, making the passengers cross as well. Sir Topham Hatt later tells him: "No passengers means no polish!"
92	14	"Gallant Old Engine"	David Mitton	Same story by Rev. W. Awdry	21 March 1996 (Note: This episode was first released on the Story and Song Collection VHS on 4 March 1996.)	414
Skarloey wants to talk some sense into a grumpy Duncan, so he tells the story of Rheneas, who once went through a steep hill and crude weather for the sake of his passengers. Duncan is impressed and readily promises to be a more social, respectable, kinder locomotive in the future. In the end, Rheneas comes home and all the engines whistle as a celebration.
93	15	"Rusty to the Rescue"	David Mitton	Original by Britt Allcroft and David Mitton	22 March 1996	415
A new engine is needed for the Bluebell Railway, and Douglas suggests to Rusty to search the mainland scrapyard where Oliver was found. Rusty sets out bravely on their mission since only diesels can go there, and they're lucky to find and rescue a tank engine named Stepney.
94	16	"Thomas and Stepney"	David Mitton	Stepney the "Bluebell" Engine by Rev. W. Awdry	25 March 1996	416
94	16	"Thomas and Stepney"	David Mitton	Based on Bluebells of England and Stepney's Special	25 March 1996	416
Thomas is jealous when the visiting engine Stepney gets more attention than he does. It makes his anger worse when he is shunted on his own branch line for Stepney that night.
95	17	"Train Stops Play"	David Mitton	Stepney the "Bluebell" Engine by Rev. W. Awdry	26 March 1996 (Note: This episode was first released on the Thomas' Train and 17 other Stories VHS on 3 July 1995.)	418
As Stepney's driver and fireman watch a game of cricket, a player hits the ball so hard it lands in one of Stepney's trucks. Therefore, the players chase Stepney in their elderly car, Caroline, to retrieve their ball.
96	18	"Bowled Out"	David Mitton	Stepney the "Bluebell" Engine by Rev. W. Awdry	27 March 1996	417
Stepney's visit to Sir Topham Hatt's railway is coming to an end soon, and a new visitor, a rude and snobbish diesel named Class 40, arrives. An inspector's bowler hat soon puts him in his place, and Duck and Stepney pull the Express. Stepney leaves with high praises, whilst the embarrassed diesel slips away quietly.
97	19	"Henry and the Elephant"	David Mitton	Troublesome Engines by Rev. W. Awdry	28 March 1996	419
The circus has arrived and Henry and Gordon are upset when James gets to pull the circus train instead of one of them when it's time for it to leave. Later, Henry is called to investigate a blockage in his tunnel, where he unhappily comes across an elephant which the circus troupe had inadvertently left behind.
98	20	"Toad Stands By"	David Mitton	Oliver the Western Engine by Rev. W. Awdry	29 March 1996	423
When Oliver returns to the rails after his accident in the turntable well, the Troublesome Trucks (led by S.C.Ruffey) tease him for his previous accident by singing songs rude and loud. The next day, Toad confers with Douglas and then Oliver about his plan to put the troublesome trucks in their place. Soon, Oliver desperately pulls S.C.Ruffey apart, much to the horror of the trucks and the delight of Duck and Toad. Soon after, S.C.Ruffey learns his lesson and says nothing at all.
99	21	"Bulls Eyes"	David Mitton	Branch Line Engines by Rev. W. Awdry	1 April 1996	422
Claiming that Toby is afraid of getting hurt, Daisy makes fun of his cowcatchers. She also brags that she can just command a cow to move out of her way. However, her boasting is tested when she comes across a bull named Champion on the line, that will need more than a command to move away.
100	22	"Thomas and the Special Letter"	David Mitton	The Eight Famous Engines by Rev. W. Awdry	2 April 1996	421
100	22	"Thomas and the Special Letter"	David Mitton	Based on The Fat Controller's Engines	2 April 1996	421
After finishing his last journey for the day, Thomas sees a parade of engines and wonders what is going on. At the engine sheds, Sir Topham Hatt reads an invitation from a little girl asking everybody to visit the big city. He then tells the engines who are going that they must show other engines their tasks. Thomas shows Oliver how to manage coaches, but while reminiscing the time he beat Bertie in a race, he runs through some buffers and a fence, slides down a grassy slope and crashes into a brick wall, causing his bumper to collapse, and also putting the big trip in jeopardy.
101	23	"Paint Pots and Queens"	David Mitton	Gordon the Big Engine by Rev. W. Awdry	3 April 1996	420
101	23	"Thomas Meets the Queen" (Note: Thomas Meets the Queen & Other Stories and Best of Thomas)	David Mitton	Gordon the Big Engine by Rev. W. Awdry	3 April 1996	420
Gordon and Thomas puff back to the sheds after Gordon fell into a ditch, which Thomas later teased him about, and when Thomas fell down a mine and Gordon came to rescue him. As Her Majesty The Queen plans to visit the Island, Thomas and Gordon have made up for their disgraceful punishments, and a paint accident with a boastful Henry opens up some jobs for them.
102	24	"Fish"	David Mitton	Really Useful Engines by Christopher Awdry	4 April 1996	424
Henry is assigned to deliver the Flying Kipper, and Duck becomes a banker when a few extra vans are added to the train. However, a badly attached tail lamp causes problems on Gordon's Hill.
103	25	"Special Attraction"	David Mitton	Toby, Trucks and Trouble by Christopher Awdry	5 April 1996	425
103	25	"Special Attraction"	David Mitton	Based on Toby's Seaside Holiday and Bulstrode	5 April 1996	425
Toby is let down when he realises there is not enough room for him at a seaside festival. Meanwhile, Percy is sent to the harbour to deal with the troublesome trucks, and a cross self-propelled barge called Bulstrode.
104	26	"Mind That Bike"	David Mitton	Really Useful Engines by Christopher Awdry	8 April 1996	426
A postman called Tom Tipper is upset about losing his van and having to ride a bike to deliver the post. As Tom is in a rush, Percy inadvertently crushes his bike. In the end, Tom gets a smart new van.

== Reception ==
Kurt Dahlke a reviewer of DVD Talk, who reviewed the series 4 episodes "Bulldog" and "Peter Sam and the Refreshment Lady" for the DVD: Thomas & Friends: Hop on Board - Songs and Stories, give them a mixed-to-negative review, saying that you might survive just by giving it a Rent It.

== Home media ==
=== United Kingdom ===
As with Series 3, much of Series 4 debuted on VHS before the TV screenings. The Video Collection released "Rock 'n' Roll and Other Stories" in November 1994 which contained eight episodes. Another selection of nine episodes was released on "Thomas & Stepney and Other Stories" in May 1995, and two more episodes debuted on the compilation release "Thomas' Train and 17 Other Stories" in July 1995. The last remaining five episodes which had already aired on television at that point were released as "Story and Song Collection" in March 1996, with five songs produced for the series.

Video Collection International released a complete series VHS set in 2001, available as either a single-VHS or double-VHS release. It was soon released on DVD in 2004 as part of the "Classic Collection Boxset" before being released on its own in 2006.

Episodes from the series (such as "Peter Sam & the Refreshment Lady" and "Four Little Engines") have also made it to various compilation releases with other series. Such as "Playtime" in March 1997 and "Chases, Races and Runaways" in October 1997.
