= Thomas & Friends series 2 =

Season of television series

Thomas & Friends
- Series 2
- DVD cover art
- No. of episodes: 26

Release
- Original network: ITV (Central) (via Children's ITV)
- Original release: 24 September – 17 December 1986

Series chronology
- ← Previous; Series 1 Next → Series 3

Thomas the Tank Engine & Friends is a children's television series about the engines and other characters working on the railways of the Island of Sodor, and is based on The Railway Series books written by Wilbert Awdry. It was produced by Clearwater Features Ltd. for Britt Allcroft (Thomas) Ltd. and Central Independent Television.

This article lists and details episodes from the second series of the show, which was first broadcast in 1986. This series was initially narrated by Ringo Starr for the United Kingdom audiences, who later re-narrated 16 episodes for Shining Time Station in the United States in 1989. The entire series was narrated by George Carlin for US audiences beginning in 1991.

== Production ==
=== Writing ===
Christopher Awdry was commissioned to write a new Railway Series book as source material for the second series. Three stories from More About Thomas the Tank Engine provided additional roles for Bertie the Bus, Terence the Tractor, and Harold the Helicopter. The episodes "Thomas and the Missing Christmas Tree" and "Thomas and Trevor" were both one-off stories written by Christopher. The following series would begin to use original stories by the production staff, with some of the remaining Railway Series stories deemed "repetitive and too 'storybook' orientated".

=== Filming ===
Early in production, a third episode based on The Twin Engines was due to be filmed, based largely on the stories "Hullo Twins" and "The Missing Coach". This was originally to be the episode Donald and Douglas were introduced in. It was thought that the model crew had gone as far as filming scenes on the Tidmouth Station set with Thomas arriving at the station, before Britt Allcroft decided the episode was not worthy enough. Subsequently, the episode was cancelled and the story's exposition was instead included in the episode adaptation of the story "Break Van", which would instead serve as the twin engines' introductory episode.

This series began production in September 1985 and completed filming in June 1986.

== Episodes ==
No. overall	No. in series	UK title (top) US title (bottom)	Directed by	Source	Original release date	Official No.	Half-Hour No.
27	1	"Thomas, Percy and the Coal"	David Mitton	More About Thomas the Tank Engine by Christopher Awdry	24 September 1986	201	ITV-201a
27	1	"Double Trouble"	David Mitton	More About Thomas the Tank Engine by Christopher Awdry	24 September 1986	201	ITV-201a
Thomas brags to Percy and Toby about how he thinks blue is the only proper colour for a really useful engine. Later, he gets trapped under a coal hopper, which ruins his paint. He blames an amused Percy for his incident because Percy inadvertently moved the careless trucks out from under the hopper. Percy later crashes into a pile of coal on a siding, amusing Thomas. The two reconcile that night.
28	2	"Cows"	David Mitton	Edward the Blue Engine by Rev. W. Awdry	24 September 1986	202	ITV-201b
28	2	"A Cow on the Line"	David Mitton	Edward the Blue Engine by Rev. W. Awdry	24 September 1986	202	ITV-201b
Gordon and Henry tease Edward after some cows break away the back end of his train. Later on, Gordon and Henry are humbled after they both encounter a cow on the line and are too afraid to oppose it.
29	3	"Bertie's Chase"	David Mitton	Edward the Blue Engine by Rev. W. Awdry	1 October 1986	203	ITV-202a
Thomas' fireman is unable to come in to work one day and Bertie agrees to take his passengers. Oblivious of the change of plan, Edward leaves before Bertie arrives at the station, and so Bertie has to chase after him.
30	4	"Saved from Scrap"	David Mitton	Edward the Blue Engine by Rev. W. Awdry	1 October 1986	204	ITV-202b
At the scrapyard, Edward meets a traction engine named Trevor, who is due to be broken up in a week, despite being in perfect working condition. Edward is determined to save him and finds the man to do so.
31	5	"Old Iron"	David Mitton	Edward the Blue Engine by Rev. W. Awdry	8 October 1986	205	ITV-203a
James calls Edward slow due to him constantly being late. When two boys meddle with James' controls, causing him to become a runaway, Edward is the only engine available to rescue him. James regrets his comments and apologises to Edward.
32	6	"Thomas and Trevor"	David Mitton	1987 Thomas Annual story by Christopher Awdry	8 October 1986	206	ITV-203b
32	6	"A New Friend for Thomas"	David Mitton	1987 Thomas Annual story by Christopher Awdry	8 October 1986	206	ITV-203b
Trevor is bored of working in the vicarage orchard, so Edward takes him to meet Thomas and help him at the new harbour. A skeptical Thomas gradually gains respect for Trevor.
33	7	"Percy and the Signal"	David Mitton	Percy the Small Engine by Rev. W. Awdry	15 October 1986	207	ITV-204a
Percy plays tricks on the bigger engines, first annoying Gordon and then tricking James into staying in his shed for the rest of the day. Sir Topham Hatt scolds both James and Percy for their actions. Gordon helps James get revenge by tricking Percy into misreading a signal that goes up, referring to it as a "backing signal". Percy is humiliated in front of Gordon, who further embarrasses him with James that night.
34	8	"Duck Takes Charge"	David Mitton	Percy the Small Engine by Rev. W. Awdry	15 October 1986	208	ITV-204b
Sir Topham Hatt buys a Great Western tank engine called Montague, nicknamed "Duck", to help out an overworked Percy. After the big engines start ordering Duck about, he and Percy retaliate by blocking them from entering Tidmouth Sheds in protest. Sir Topham Hatt scolds Duck for causing a disturbance but acknowledges his hard work, then scolds the big engines for starting the issue. While Percy goes to work at a new harbour, Duck manages shunting work alone with ease.
35	9	"Percy and Harold"	David Mitton	Percy the Small Engine by Rev. W. Awdry	22 October 1986	209	ITV-205a
35	9	"Percy Proves a Point"	David Mitton	Percy the Small Engine by Rev. W. Awdry	22 October 1986	209	ITV-205a
At his new harbour job, Percy meets a boastful helicopter named Harold. Percy and Harold agree to a race to the wharf to prove one another's worth. Percy wins as Harold is unable to land before Percy arrives at their destination.
36	10	"The Runaway"	David Mitton	More About Thomas the Tank Engine by Christopher Awdry	22 October 1986	210	ITV-205b
Thomas is ill one morning and has to go to the works. He soon comes back, but has a problem with his stiff brakes. This proves disastrous when a temporary fireman forgets about it and Thomas becomes a runaway. An engine inspector saves him by boarding Harold, chasing Thomas down, jumping aboard at a station, and applies his brakes. Thomas and the inspector thank Harold for his help.
37	11	"Percy Takes the Plunge"	David Mitton	The Eight Famous Engines by Rev. W. Awdry	29 October 1986	211	ITV-206a
37	11	"Percy Takes a Plunge" (Note: Best of Percy home media.)	David Mitton	The Eight Famous Engines by Rev. W. Awdry	29 October 1986	211	ITV-206a
Percy boasts that "water is nothing to an engine with determination", which annoys Henry. Percy later finds a danger sign in front of a quay that sinks into the ocean. Oblivious to the unstable quay, Percy plans to pass it. Percy asks his train of trucks to push him past the board, but their force sends him into the sea. Sir Topham Hatt cannot authorise a rescue until the tide comes in, so Percy is left there until nighttime. Henry mocks Percy when transporting him to a repair yard.
38	12	"Pop Goes the Diesel"	David Mitton	Duck and the Diesel Engine by Rev. W. Awdry	29 October 1986	212	ITV-206b
A new trial engine called Diesel arrives on the island and Duck is given the task of showing him what to do. When Diesel boasts that his kind are "revolutionary" and they know everything, Duck leaves him to shunt some old and empty trucks. Diesel damages the trucks' chassis, which causes them to derail. Duck mocks Diesel, who is forced to clean up his mess.
39	13	"Dirty Work"	David Mitton	Duck and the Diesel Engine by Rev. W. Awdry	5 November 1986	213	ITV-207a
39	13	"Diesel's Devious Deed" (Note: Also titled "Diesel's Devilish Deed" in for the Thomas' Halloween Adventures DVD.)	David Mitton	Duck and the Diesel Engine by Rev. W. Awdry	5 November 1986	213	ITV-207a
Diesel blames Duck for his incident with the trucks and, as revenge, Diesel tells degrading lies about the big engines to them saying Duck told him. The bigger engines believe Diesel and turn on Duck. While trying to get to the bottom of the incident, Sir Topham Hatt sends Duck to work with Edward. Duck leaves sadly, thinking Sir Topham has turned on him too, much to Diesel's satisfaction.
40	14	"A Close Shave"	David Mitton	Duck and the Diesel Engine by Rev. W. Awdry	5 November 1986	214	ITV-207b
40	14	"A Close Shave for Duck"	David Mitton	Duck and the Diesel Engine by Rev. W. Awdry	5 November 1986	214	ITV-207b
Duck finds himself on the receiving end of a runaway train during his stay with Edward. He manages to control them, despite crashing into a barber shop. Sir Topham Hatt tells Duck that he has sent Diesel away in disgrace after he continued to tell lies, and Duck is welcomed back into the yard.
41	15	"Better Late Than Never"	David Mitton	More About Thomas the Tank Engine by Christopher Awdry	12 November 1986	215	ITV-208a
The viaduct on the main line is under repair, causing delays to the railway as Sir Topham Hatt refuses to close it. Thomas blames the big engines for the delays and dismisses their explanations as excuses, while Bertie is frustrated with Thomas for frequently being late. When trying to make up for lost time during a passenger journey, Thomas finds Bertie broken down at a level crossing. Thomas is able to take Bertie's passengers because of his lateness and promises to send for help. After Bertie is repaired, he and Thomas reconcile.
42	16	"Break Van"	David Mitton	The Twin Engines by Rev. W. Awdry	12 November 1986	216	ITV-208b
42	16	"Donald and Douglas"	David Mitton	The Twin Engines by Rev. W. Awdry	12 November 1986	216	ITV-208b
Donald and Douglas are twin tender engines whom Sir Topham Hatt had bought from Scotland to help out, although only one engine had been expected. He intends to send either twin back. A spiteful brake van deliberately delays Douglas' trains, prompting Donald to threaten the brake van into behaving. The brake van later makes James stall on a hill; when Douglas arrives to push from behind, he accidentally shatters the van. Sir Topham ponders the situation.
43	17	"The Deputation"	David Mitton	The Twin Engines by Rev. W. Awdry	19 November 1986	217	ITV-209a
Heavy snow falls upon on the Island of Sodor. Donald and Douglas, who are used to snow, use their snowploughs to clear the tracks. After they free Henry from a snowdrift, the other engines become determined to help both of them stay on Sodor, as the one returning home will be turned into scrap. A nervous Percy is sent to discuss with Sir Topham Hatt as a deputation. Ultimately, Sir Topham announces he will keep both of them.
44	18	"Thomas Comes to Breakfast"	David Mitton	Branch Line Engines by Rev. W. Awdry	19 November 1986	218	ITV-209b
Thomas' driver jokes that he can almost manage running the branch line on his own. Thomas takes his comment seriously, and is determined to prove to Percy and Toby that he can move by himself. Thomas goes down the line thinking he is achieving his goal when it was actually a cleaner carelessly who meddled with his controls. Thomas is unable to stop and crashes into the station master's house. In disgrace, Thomas is sent away to be repaired.
45	19	"Daisy"	David Mitton	Branch Line Engines by Rev. W. Awdry	26 November 1986	219	ITV-210a
Sir Topham Hatt buys a diesel railcar named Daisy to temporarily serve in Thomas' absence. Daisy proves to be stubborn and refuses to perform jobs she finds unsuitable. She delays a passenger train to avoid hauling a milk tanker; her crew is forced to remove the tanker under pressure. Daisy believes she can manipulate to choose which jobs she does.
46	20	"Percy's Predicament"	David Mitton	Branch Line Engines by Rev. W. Awdry	26 November 1986	220	ITV-210b
While Toby takes the milk tanker that Daisy repeatedly leaves behind, he offers to swap jobs with Percy. Working at the quarry for the first time, Percy finds delight in ordering the trucks about. Frustrated with Percy, the trucks retaliate by pushing him down the line and into a brake van. Sir Topham Hatt tells Daisy off for being lazy, but gives her a second chance when Toby describes how hard she worked after Percy's accident. Daisy promises to change her ways with Toby's help. Thomas soon returns while Percy is sent for repairs.
47	21	"The Diseasel"	David Mitton	Main Line Engines by Rev. W. Awdry	3 December 1986	221	ITV-211a
Bill and Ben are twin saddle tank engines who work at the Sodor China Clay Pits. One day, they are aghast when they discover that all their china clay trucks have gone missing. They find the trucks with a diesel, whom they confuse and annoy for fun. Edward scolds the twins for their behaviour. They apologise to the diesel, who introduces himself as BoCo, and leave. Edward tells BoCo the twins mean no harm.
48	22	"Wrong Road"	David Mitton	Main Line Engines by Rev. W. Awdry	3 December 1986	222	ITV-211b
Gordon remarks to Edward that branch lines are "vulgar" and that Sir Topham Hatt would not approve of him running on them. However, when a lady's green hat is mistaken for a flag, Edward's 6:30 train ends up on the main line while Gordon's 6:25 express goes onto the branch, where Bill and Ben are waiting for BoCo's trucks the next morning. The twins tease a stressed Gordon before they are subdued by BoCo.
49	23	"Edward's Exploit" (Note: Also titled "Edward's Exploits" on some schedules and home media releases.)	David Mitton	Main Line Engines by Rev. W. Awdry	10 December 1986	223	ITV-212a
Tourists visit the Island of Sodor and Edward is due to take them to meet Bill and Ben. Gordon and Henry insult Edward by deeming him too old to work. During the journey home, a heavy storm hits and Edward's wheels start slipping on the wet rails. His left rear crankpin suddenly breaks, causing Edward great physical damage that prompts his crew to remove one of his side rods. Despite extreme difficulty, Edward continues hauling the train and gets the passengers to their destination. Henry, Gordon and James become respectful towards Edward.
50	24	"Ghost Train"	David Mitton	Tramway Engines by Rev. W. Awdry	10 December 1986	224	ITV-212b
50	24	"Percy's Ghostly Trick"	David Mitton	Tramway Engines by Rev. W. Awdry	10 December 1986	224	ITV-212b
Thomas thinks Percy is being silly when he tells him about a ghost train his driver saw the previous night, which turns out to be a ghost story on television. The next night, Percy crashes into a cart of lime powder, turning him pale white. With help from Toby, Percy plays a trick on Thomas by pretending to be a ghost. The trick successfully scares Thomas.
51	25	"Woolly Bear"	David Mitton	Tramway Engines by Rev. W. Awdry	17 December 1986	225	ITV-213a
Percy continues to tease Thomas about the ghost trick. Thomas retorts by calling Percy "a green caterpillar with red stripes" and criticises him for being late. Soon afterwards, a crate of black treacle lands on Percy at the harbour. When he departs, he gets stuck on a hill, windswept with hay. Percy arrives back at the station covered in hay, to Thomas' amusement.
52	26	"Thomas and the Missing Christmas Tree"	David Mitton	Same story by Christopher Awdry	17 December 1986	226	ITV-213b
The day before Christmas Eve, the engines are hard at work getting ready for Sodor's annual Christmas carol party. Thomas is sent to collect the Christmas tree for the party, but he ends up getting buried in a huge snowdrift on the way back. Donald and Douglas come to the rescue and bring him back in time for the party. Note: Due to Ringo Starr's departure before he had a chance to re-narrate certain lines, all lines mentioning the Fat Controller were omitted, but were not re-narrated with "Sir Topham Hatt" in their place, leaving some large sections of pauses in some places. This version can only be found on the VHS release of Shining Time Station's Christmas Special "Tis a Gift", which was first released on 27 October 1992.

== Home media ==
Series 2 was first released as three separate VHS volumes by Pickwick's Screen Legends imprint in 1986. The Video Collection later re-released them in the 1990s, and have seen numerous re-releases over the years.

Video Collection International released a complete series VHS set in 1999, available as either a single-VHS or double-VHS release. It was soon released on DVD in 2004 as part of the "Classic Collection Boxset" before being released on its own the following year. The 2012 re-release by HIT Entertainment utilised the 2003 restoration of the series. Episodes from the series have also made it to various compilation releases with other series.
