= Thomas & Friends series 3 =

Season of television series

Thomas & Friends
- Series 3
- DVD cover art
- No. of episodes: 26

Release
- Original network: ITV (Thames Television) (via Children's ITV)
- Original release: 25 February – 14 July 1992

Series chronology
- ← Previous; Series 2 Next → Series 4

Thomas the Tank Engine & Friends is a children's television series about the engines and other characters working on the railways of the Island of Sodor, and is based on The Railway Series books written by Wilbert Awdry.

This article lists and details episodes from the third series of the show, which was first broadcast in the UK between 25 February and 14 July 1992, and in the United States as part of Shining Time Station in November 1991 (shortly after being released direct-to-video in the UK). In 1993, the last ten episodes were released in the United States on Shining Time Station.

== Production ==
=== Filming ===
Series 3 was produced by The Britt Allcroft Company in association with Japanese television station Fuji Television. It was divided into two parts, one part having 16 episodes and the other having ten. The series was filmed and produced in 1991. 16 episodes were released direct-to-video on 11 November 1991, in the United Kingdom, and aired in the United States from 18 November to 27 December 1991, as part of Shining Time Station. They remained unaired in the UK until 25 February 1992, when the full series aired there. The last ten episodes aired on Shining Time Station in 1993. It was made at a cost of £1,300,000. Before production of series 3, Clearwater Features closed down, with The Britt Allcroft Company becoming the sole producer. Producer Robert D. Cardona left before series 3, and Britt Allcroft took his place as co-producer alongside David Mitton.

=== Stories ===
The series was a combination of episodes derived from The Railway Series, stories in the Thomas the Tank Engine & Friends magazines (written by an uncredited Andrew Brenner, who would later become the show's head writer from 2013 to 2018), and a couple of original stories by Allcroft and Mitton. One of the primary reasons for diverging from the original books was that many of the stories not yet used featured large numbers of new characters, which would be expensive to produce. Another was that the producers wanted more stories about Thomas, the nominal main character. Awdry complained that the new stories would be unrealistic.

Awdry's complaints were directed at two aspects of the episode "Henry's Forest" in particular. One was that it was unrealistic to have a railway running through a forest, and that sparks from an engine's funnel could cause a wildfire. Britt Allcroft countered this aspect by claiming that she had seen a number of lines do the same thing.

The other aspect was that Henry stops to admire the view without alerting the signalman, which was in direct contravention of British Railways' Rule 55. This (Awdry argued) would never be allowed to happen in real life, and would be highly unsafe.

== Episodes ==
No. overall	No. in series	UK title (top) US title (bottom)	Directed by	Source	Original release date	Official No.	Half-Hour No.
53	1	"A Scarf for Percy"	David Mitton	Henry the Green Engine by Rev. W. Awdry	25 February 1992 (Note: This episode was first released on the Time for Trouble and Other Stories VHS on 11 November 1991.)	301	ITV-301
53	1	"A Scarf for Percy"	David Mitton	Based on Percy and the Trousers	25 February 1992	301	ITV-301
Percy complains about the cold weather and expresses desire for a scarf around his funnel. Later on, Percy tries to surprise his passenger coaches but accidentally collides with a baggage cart. The collision results in jam being spilt on the passengers, Percy, Sir Topham Hatt, and the latter's previously-clean pair of trousers which lands around Percy's funnel. James the Red Engine mocks Percy by reminding him of his prior want for a scarf around his funnel, which Percy abandons.
54	2	"Percy's Promise"	David Mitton	Percy the Small Engine by Rev. W. Awdry	3 March 1992	302	ITV-302
Percy promises Thomas to take the Sunday school class home with Annie and Clarabel, but a thunderstorm makes it very difficult to get there. Before long, Percy runs into a severe flood that leaks in and douses his fire. Nonetheless, Percy persists and is hailed by everyone when he gets home.
55	3	"Time for Trouble"	David Mitton	The Eight Famous Engines by Rev. W. Awdry	17 March 1992	303	ITV-303
55	3	"Time for Trouble"	David Mitton	Based on Double Header	17 March 1992	303	ITV-303
Gordon the Big Engine is given a break from express train duties, which go to James. James gets an ego boost and boasts to Toby the Tram Engine about his importance and reliability. Toby is sent to have his old parts replaced, but breaks down on the main line on the way there. James reluctantly pushes Toby to the station whilst pulling the train. James feels humiliated by this when some boys tease him.
56	4	"Gordon and the Famous Visitor"	David Mitton	Duck and the Diesel Engine by Rev. W. Awdry	24 March 1992	304	ITV-304
56	4	"Gordon and the Famous Visitor"	David Mitton	Based on Domeless Engines	24 March 1992	304	ITV-304
Celebrity engine City of Truro visits the Island of Sodor and proves to be friendly. Gordon is jealous of City of Truro's status as the first engine to surpass 100 miles per hour and insults his lack of a steam dome. Gordon is determined to break his speed record, resulting in his dome getting blown off by strong wind and falling below the viaduct. He is unable to retrieve it and must remain without a dome until the next day. That night at the train sheds, the engines repeat Gordon's insults back to him.
57	5	"Donald's Duck"	David Mitton	Oliver the Western Engine by Rev. W. Awdry	31 March 1992	305	ITV-305
Sir Topham rewards Duck for his hard work by putting him in charge of a new branch line. Donald grows tired of Duck's boastfulness and mocks him by imitating duck noises, saying he quacks too much, and remarking that he sounds like he laid an egg. Offended, Duck tells his crew, who plan to get back at Donald by hiding a duckling in his water tank. Donald is amused by the payback and befriends the duckling. He and his crew respond by placing the duckling in a nest underneath Duck to resemble laying an egg.
58	6	"Thomas Gets Bumped"	David Mitton	Hello, Thomas! & A Bump on the Line by Andrew Brenner	7 April 1992	306	ITV-306a
Thomas becomes worried when Percy jokes that he may be replaced if he is late too many times. The following day, Thomas helps a group of children return home; their school bus had broken down. This makes Thomas late, which worries him further. The morning after, Thomas derails on a part of the tracks that became warped by the sun's heat. He is reassigned to shunting while the tracks are under repair and thinks he has been replaced, but Sir Topham tells him his timetable has been updated so that he and Bertie may work together more often.
59	7	"Thomas, Percy and the Dragon"	David Mitton	Percy's Night Out & Percy and the Dragon by Andrew Brenner	7 April 1992	307	ITV-306b
Percy continues to gleefully tease Thomas about his ghost prank. The next night, Thomas has to take a paper Chinese dragon to the carnival. Percy has to stay in a siding overnight, and is terrified by the dragon when Thomas passes. The next morning, Percy tells the other engines about the dragon, but they refuse to believe him. As a result, Percy begins to believe that the dragon was just his imagination. However, he is proven wrong when Thomas arrives with the dragon. The two friends settle their quarrel and reconcile.
60	8	"Diesel Does It Again"	David Mitton	Trouble in the Harbour Yard & Bumps by Andrew Brenner	14 April 1992	308	ITV-307a
Duck and Percy are unimpressed when Diesel comes to work at the harbour, even though Sir Topham Hatt promised that he would be gone for good after for his last visit. Diesel proves to be disruptive to the troublesome trucks, prompting Duck and Percy to go on strike. Sir Topham Hatt accepts their demand for Diesel to leave when he pushes a train of open wagons into the sea.
61	9	"Henry's Forest"	David Mitton	The magazine story of the same name and Clearing Up by Andrew Brenner	14 April 1992 (Note: This episode was first released on the Trust Thomas and Other Stories VHS on 11 November 1991.)	309	ITV-307b
Henry loves going to the forest to admire the scenery after they were planted not too long ago. But one night, a big storm ruins most of the forest, making him sad the next morning. In order to make Henry feel happy again, new trees must be planted to replace the damaged ones.
62	10	"The Trouble with Mud"	David Mitton	Gordon the Big Engine by Rev. W. Awdry	21 April 1992	310	ITV-308a
62	10	"The Trouble with Mud"	David Mitton	Based on Leaves	21 April 1992	310	ITV-308a
Gordon is too muddy to pull the express, and ends up pulling trucks instead. James is very boastful about getting the job, but he pays no attention to Gordon's warning about the slippery leaves scattered everywhere making the hill hard to climb, and he ends up slipping back down. Gordon comes to the rescue, and as a reward is permitted to pull coaches again, on the condition that he knows being clean is a necessity to every engine.
63	11	"No Joke for James"	David Mitton	The Express & A Passenger for James by Andrew Brenner	21 April 1992	311	ITV-308b
When Gordon tells James that he is not as good as he is, James lies to Thomas that he will be pulling the express while Gordon has to take the goods. When James' lie is exposed, he has to regain his dignity.
64	12	"Thomas, Percy and the Post Train"	David Mitton	The Post Train & After the Last Train by Andrew Brenner	28 April 1992	312	ITV-309a
64	12	"Thomas, Percy and the Mail Train"	David Mitton	The Post Train & After the Last Train by Andrew Brenner	28 April 1992	312	ITV-309a
Thomas and Percy like taking the mail post, but one night a boat delays them, so Harold is given the new job for being more efficient. But the engines soon find another useful job.
65	13	"Trust Thomas"	David Mitton	Bertie's Bumpy Road by Andrew Brenner	28 April 1992	313	ITV-309b
Thomas agrees to help Bertie with the mystery of the tar tankers being held up, but James does not want to do Percy's work at the harbour yards and (with advice from Gordon) fakes sickness to get out of work and gets Thomas to take his trucks. However, the Troublesome Trucks thinking one engine is as good as another put Thomas in a sticky situation at the Callan Pond.
66	14	"Mavis"	David Mitton	Tramway Engines by Rev. W. Awdry	5 May 1992	314	ITV-310a
The quarry has hired a young privately owned diesel shunter called Mavis who wishes she had better things to do instead of listening to Toby. With Diesel's unfriendly advice, she ignores Toby's advice about a frozen crossing, and soon gets stuck with her load of troublesome trucks.
67	15	"Toby's Tightrope"	David Mitton	Tramway Engines by Rev. W. Awdry	5 May 1992	315	ITV-310b
Mavis wants to run on Toby's line again, but the trouble she caused forbids her to do so. So she makes a plan with the Troublesome Trucks that gets her on the line, but things go wrong when Toby takes the Troublesome Trucks instead and they push him onto a collapsing bridge. Mavis comes to the rescue just in time.
68	16	"Edward, Trevor and the Really Useful Party"	David Mitton	The Vicar's Fěte & Edward and the Vicar by Andrew Brenner	12 May 1992	316	ITV-311a
Reverend Charles Laxey (known as the Vicar) is planning a garden party, and Trevor tells Edward his news about it, making him want to help. Despite the fact that Bertie is teasing Trevor for being slow, the party becomes successful for both Edward and Trevor.
69	17	"Buzz Buzz" (Note: Also titled "Buzz, Buzz" (with the comma) in restored and remastered versions of the episode.)	David Mitton	Main Line Engines by Rev. W. Awdry	12 May 1992	317	ITV-311b
69	17	"James Goes Buzz Buzz" (Note: James Goes Buzz Buzz & Other Stories and Best of James)	David Mitton	Main Line Engines by Rev. W. Awdry	12 May 1992	317	ITV-311b
James boasts to a cross Duck and BoCo about not being afraid of bees, but later James gets a surprise when a beehive breaks and the bees cause havoc, resting on his hot boiler and stinging him on the nose. James tries to get rid of the bees, but nothing works until they find new beehives in the vicarage orchard.
70	18	"All at Sea"	David Mitton	Original Story by Britt Allcroft and David Mitton	19 May 1992	318	ITV-312
While watching the local regatta, Duck tells Percy he wishes about going overseas to different places. But soon Duck must help an injured sailor to the hospital in order to show that engines are really useful.
71	19	"One Good Turn"	David Mitton	Head On & Pulling Together by Andrew Brenner	26 May 1992	319	ITV-313
Bill and Ben work hard all day, and finally get to go on the turntable in the yard. But Bill and Ben end up being face to face. They argue with each other and fall out, but Edward comes up with an idea to save their friendship.
72	20	"Tender Engines"	David Mitton	Enterprising Engines by Rev. W. Awdry	2 June 1992	320	ITV-314
72	20	"Tender Engines"	David Mitton	Based on Tenders for Henry	2 June 1992	320	ITV-314
A double-tendered visitor (unknowingly being the Flying Scotsman) causes trouble. Although Gordon overcomes his problem about doubting steam engines' usefulness, Henry wants more than one tender, and his dream comes true in a very bizarre fashion.
73	21	"Escape!" (Note: Also titled "Escape" (without the "!") in restored and remastered versions of the episode.)	David Mitton	Enterprising Engines by Rev. W. Awdry	9 June 1992	321	ITV-315
73	21	"Escape!"	David Mitton	Based on the story of the same name and Little Western	9 June 1992	321	ITV-315
Edward tells Douglas about the time he saved Trevor from scrap. That night, as Douglas delivers a goods train to the scrapyard, he does the same by rescuing another Great Western tank engine called Oliver and his brake van named Toad.
74	22	"Oliver Owns Up"	David Mitton	Oliver the Western Engine by Rev. W. Awdry	16 June 1992	322	ITV-316
74	22	"Oliver Owns Up"	David Mitton	Based on Resource and Sagacity	16 June 1992	322	ITV-316
Oliver is new to Sodor, and all the engines complimenting his courage is making him conceited. He ignores Duck's warning about the troublesome trucks and they push him down into the turntable well.
75	23	"Bulgy"	David Mitton	Oliver the Western Engine by Rev. W. Awdry	23 June 1992	323	ITV-317
Duck and Oliver encounter Bulgy, a double-decker bus who does not like rails. He tries to take Duck's passengers away by pretending to be a "railway bus" and taking them on an attempted shortcut. Duck finds him later, stuck under a collapsed bridge, and rescues his passengers, whilst Bulgy is turned into a henhouse.
76	24	"Heroes"	David Mitton	In a Muddle & the magazine story of the same name by Andrew Brenner	30 June 1992	324	ITV-318
The Troublesome Trucks at the harbour cause trouble for Bill and Ben, but while working at the quarry the next day, they save the workers from a dangerous rockslide that destroys most of the quarry.
77	25	"Percy, James and the Fruitful Day"	David Mitton	Percy Gets Jammed by Andrew Brenner	7 July 1992	325	ITV-319
James is collecting some fruit from the harbour. But when he breaks down during his trip, Percy is forced to take it himself, but he goes so fast that he winds up squashing it all.
78	26	"Thomas and Percy's Christmas Adventure"	David Mitton	Original Story by Britt Allcroft and David Mitton	14 July 1992	326	ITV-320
78	26	"Thomas and Percy's Mountain Adventure" (Note: Percy's Ghostly Trick & Other Thomas Stories, Thomas & His Friends Help Out, Thomas' Christmas Wonderland & Other Thomas Adventures, and Ultimate Christmas)	David Mitton	Original Story by Britt Allcroft and David Mitton	14 July 1992	326	ITV-320
Thomas looks forward to delivering his mail to the people of the mountain village, but a blizzard delays the journeys, which means that he and Percy (along with Terence and Harold) must work together.

== Home media ==
The first two-thirds of series 3 debuted on VHS by The Video Collection in November 1991, as two volumes titled "Time for Trouble and Other Stories" and "Trust Thomas and Other Stories". The other third of the series was released on VHS in 1992 following the TV airings, titled "Escape and Other Stories".

Video Collection International released a complete series VHS set in 2000, available as either a single-VHS or double-VHS release. It was soon released on DVD in 2004 as part of the "Classic Collection Boxset" before being released on its own in 2006. The 2012 re-release by HIT Entertainment utilised the 2003 restoration of the series.
