= The Fat Controller =

Fictional character

- The Railway Series and Thomas & Friends character
- Figurine prop as seen in the series 2 episode "Duck Takes Charge" (1986)
- First appearance: The Three Railway Engines (1945)
- Created by: Rev. W. Awdry
- Designed by: William Middleton
- Voiced by: British: Keith Wickham (2009–2021); Bruce Dow (2021–2022); Tom Dussek (2022–2025); American: Kerry Shale (2009–2015); Keith Wickham (2015–2020); Bruce Dow (2021–2025)

In-universe information
- Full name: Sir Topham Hatt
- Gender: Male
- Occupation: Controller of the North Western Railway
- Spouse: Lady Hatt
- Nationality: English

The Fat Controller is a fictional character from the British children's books, The Railway Series, written by the Reverend W. Awdry and his son, Christopher Awdry. He is the controller of the North Western Railway on the Island of Sodor, which includes Thomas the Tank Engine among its engines.

In the first two books in the series (The Three Railway Engines and Thomas the Tank Engine) he is known as The Fat Director, and as of the third book (James the Red Engine), The Fat Controller. In the introduction to the 1951 book Henry the Green Engine, his real name is revealed to be Sir Topham Hatt.

The Fat Controller also appears in the television series Thomas & Friends, adapted from the books. (Note: There are four controllers, but he is portrayed as one character in the television series.) In Series 4-7, he controls the narrow gauge Skarloey Railway as well as the standard gauge North Western Railway. From Series 9 onwards, he only controls the North Western Railway while The Thin Controller, Mr. Peregrine Percival, controls the Skarloey Railway. The Fat Controller was usually portrayed in the form of several different static figures made with either wood or lead during series one, and resin from series two onwards, but has been portrayed using CGI from the twelfth series until the twenty-fourth.

The term "fat controller" has since been adopted in various contexts in the English language, beyond the sphere of the original stories, usually in reference to someone who runs a railway.

== The Railway Series ==
In the original books, there are three Sir Topham Hatts, all of whom are direct descendants of one another. A fourth Topham Hatt is introduced as the railway director in the 2025 edition of Sodor: Reading Between the Lines but has made no appearances in the series proper.

=== Sir Topham Hatt I (1880–1956) ===
Aged 14, Sir Topham Hatt acquired an apprentice job at Swindon Works. While there, he became friends with W. A. Stanier. He came to Sodor in 1901, joining A. W. Dry & Co at Tidmouth. On their recommendation, he became an engineer successively for 3 railways on the Island of Sodor.

1. The Tidmouth, Knapford, and Elsbridge Railway in 1909
2. The newly merged Tidmouth, Wellsworth, & Suddery in 1912
3. The North Western Railway on its formation in 1914

Hatt became general manager of the NWR in 1923, was promoted to director in 1936, and was made controller when the railway was nationalised in 1948.

He was awarded a baronetcy by the British parliament for his achievements in railway management. Notably, Hatt was involved in the design and construction of four vertical boiler "Coffee Pot" locomotives between 1905 and 1908, and a drawbridge linking Vicarstown to Great Britain in 1915. In 1953, he welcomed Queen Elizabeth II on a visit to Sodor. He retired the following year, and was succeeded by his son Charles Topham Hatt.

=== Sir Charles Topham Hatt II (1914–1997) ===
After graduating from Cronk School, Charles worked at a factory in Crewe, but joined the Royal Engineers upon the outbreak of World War II. He then was promoted to a Colonel, and completed his military service upon the war's conclusion.

In 1952, he returned to Sodor as an engineer at the Crovan's Gate Works. Upon the retirement of his father, Hatt became the second Director and inherited the title of Baronetcy. During his tenure, he presided over the refurbishment of Knapford Port, reopened the Arlesdale branch and building the Arlesdale Railway.

In 1940, he married Amanda Croarie and had two children, Stephen Topham and Bridget Hatt. He retired from his position as controller in 1984, and was replaced by his son, Stephen Topham Hatt.

=== Sir Stephen Topham Hatt III (1941–2023) ===
Stephen Topham Hatt became the third Director in 1984. He has had three children since marrying Helen Margaret in 1970, and in 1995 he welcomed Charles, the Prince of Wales to the Island of Sodor.

In the 2025 edition of Sodor: Reading Between the Lines it was revealed Sir Topham Hatt III had retired in 2023, but remains busy as Chairman of the Crovan's Gate Preservation Society, Sodor's first railway museum.

=== Richard Topham Hatt (2023–present) ===
Richard, became the fourth director in 2023 following his father Stephen's retirement. As of 2025 his father was still alive, and Richard had not inherited his baronetcy. At his father's retirement ceremony Richard presented him with Neil, a surviving Neilson and Company locomotive and Sodor's oldest surviving engine; which became the first addition to the new Crovan's Gate museum.

== Naming ==
The first two original stories were written before the nationalisation of Britain's four major private railways, so he was called "The Fat Director", as his railway was privately owned. In 1948, the year that the third book in the series, "James the Red Engine", was written and published, the four major private railways (and some minor ones) were nationalized under the 1947 Transport Act into British Rail, so his title was changed to "The Fat Controller".

In the British release of Thomas & Friends, he is referred to as "The Fat Controller", but his real name, Sir Topham Hatt, is sometimes used in formal situations. However, in the American release, Hatt is always referred to by his real name, as his title was considered derogatory. In the spinoff Thomas & Friends: All Engines Go, he is always referred to by his real name in both American and British releases.

== In real life ==
"Day Out with Thomas" events are a popular way of raising money for heritage railways. These events are an opportunity for children to meet characters from the books and television series (or at least, engines that have been "dressed up" to resemble them). These events are invariably presided over by a Fat Controller, played by a railway volunteer of appropriate age and build. The copyright holders are strict about how these volunteers should appear: the South Devon Railway's Fat Controller was forced to either quit or shave off his beard, and it is absolutely forbidden for a Fat Controller to be too thin. In the United States, on the other hand, he is instead portrayed as a costumed character (with the performer's face hidden).
