= C. Reginald Dalby =

British illustrator

- Born: 28 January 1904; Leicester, Leicestershire, England
- Died: 3 April 1983 (aged 79)
- Occupation(s): Illustrator, author, airman
- Years active: 1948-1956
- Spouse: Iris Dalby
- Children: Kathryn Holland

Clarence Reginald Dalby (28 January 1904 – 3 April 1983), born in Leicester, England, was the third illustrator of The Railway Series by W.V. Awdry and a Royal Air Force intelligence officer during the Second World War.

== History ==
Dalby was born in Leicester in 1904. He disliked his first forename, Clarence, and never personally used it. In 1917, Dalby won a scholarship to Leicester College of Art and began his career as a freelance artist for various commercial firms. On 14 October 1943, during the Second World War, Dalby received an emergency commission in the Royal Air Force Volunteer Reserve, as an acting pilot officer (probationary) in the Administrative Branch. Regraded to pilot officer (probationary), on 9 December 1943, Dalby served as an intelligence officer in MI9, his duties primarily concerned with developing "escape and evasion" tactics. He was confirmed in his rank on 9 June 1944 and simultaneously promoted to flying officer (war-substantive). A temporary flight lieutenant at the end of the war, Dalby was offered a position on Lord Mountbatten's staff in South-East Asia Command; he turned down the offer as he wanted to return to his artistic career. He relinquished his volunteer commission on 10 February 1954, retaining his rank of flight lieutenant.

As it was difficult to find employment as a freelance artist in post-war England, Dalby briefly worked at a blood transfusion institute in Sheffield. In 1948, he was approached by Edmund Ward, who had recently accepted the Revd. W. Awdry's stories for publication. Dalby illustrated The Railway Series books from the original title, The Three Railway Engines (which he re-illustrated, replacing the original art work by William Middleton), up until Percy the Small Engine.

Although Dalby's illustrations didn't entirely satisfy the author, and errors in detail caused all kinds of problems, his pictures—with their bold lines, lively energy and bright, gem-like colours—quickly caught the imagination of young readers and he undoubtedly set the style for the series.

(Brian Sibley, Thomas the Tank Engine: The Complete Collection)

In the end, the fractious relationship between Dalby and Awdry resulted in Dalby's resignation as illustrator of the series in 1956, following an argument over the portrayal of Percy the Small Engine in the book of the same name. Awdry had written to Dalby, "I beg, pray and exhort you not to make Percy look like a green caterpillar with red stripes!"

He was replaced by John T. Kenney as illustrator.

Dalby, a Leicester man, was also the creator of the original trademark polar bear on Fox's Glacier Mints. Fox's was a firm based in Leicester, which was also home to the Railway Series publishers Edmund Ward.

Dalby died in 1983, aged 79, following a short illness.
