= List of books in The Railway Series =

Books in book series about British locomotives

The Railway Series is a series of children's books, first published in 1945 by the British author Wilbert Awdry and later continued by his son Christopher Awdry until 2011. The series would later be adapted into the Thomas & Friends television series in 1984.

The series follows steam, diesel, and electric locomotives on the Island of Sodor, including Thomas the Tank Engine. The North Western Railway, run by Sir Topham Hatt, is the main focus of the series and first appears in the 1945 book The Three Railway Engines. Wilbert Awdry wrote 26 main books from 1945 until 1972, when he retired. After a hiatus of 11 years, Christopher Awdry took over the role of author, writing 16 books from 1983 until 2011, with a hiatus from 1997 to 2007.

== By Wilbert Awdry ==
No.	Title	Illustrator	Date	Stories	Plot	Publisher
1	The Three Railway Engines	William Middleton C. Reginald Dalby	12 May 1945	Edward's Day Out; Edward and Gordon; The Sad Story of Henry; Edward, Gordon, and Henry	Edward, an older engine, is let out of the sheds and later helps Gordon up a hill. Henry is shut up in a tunnel after refusing to come out in the rain, but is later let out after helping Edward pull Gordon's train.	Edmund Ward Ltd
2	Thomas The Tank Engine	Reginald Payne C. Reginald Dalby	14 September 1946	Thomas and Gordon; Thomas' Train; Thomas and the Trucks; Thomas and the Breakdown Train	Thomas is a tank engine who works at the big station, fetching coaches for the big engines and longs for greater things beyond the station yard. Unfortunately, his efforts go wrong. However, after showing that he can be a useful engine following James' accident with some trucks, he is rewarded with his own branch line and two coaches.	Edmund Ward Ltd
3	James the Red Engine	C. Reginald Dalby	14 September 1948	James and the Top Hat; James and the Bootlace; Troublesome Trucks; James and the Express	James returns from the works in a red livery given to him to make him feel better after his accident. Unfortunately, he is rather careless with the coaches and gets into a lot of trouble with the Fat Controller after tearing a hole in one of their brake pipes. He is left in the shed because of it, but after making some troublesome trucks behave, he regains the Fat Controller's trust and by pulling the Express when Gordon couldn't, he proves that he can be really useful.	Edmund Ward Ltd
4	Tank Engine Thomas Again	C. Reginald Dalby	31 December 1949	Thomas and the Guard; Thomas Goes Fishing; Thomas, Terence and the Snow; Thomas and Bertie	This book concerns the further adventures of Thomas on his branch line, with the bigger engines relegated to cameo appearances. Thomas leaves his guard behind by mistake, accidentally goes fishing because of a broken water column and some water from a bucket, gets stuck in the snow and is freed by Terence and has a race with Bertie.	Edmund Ward Ltd
5	Troublesome Engines	C. Reginald Dalby	15 January 1950	Henry and the Elephant; Tenders and Turntables; Trouble in the Shed; Percy Runs Away	The big engines are missing Thomas. Since he left to run his branch line, they feel overworked, and some embarrassing incidents for all three of them lead them to go on strike. The Fat Controller addresses the problem by bringing in a new tank engine to do the shunting.	Edmund Ward Ltd
6	Henry the Green Engine	C. Reginald Dalby	10 July 1951	Coal; The Flying Kipper; Gordon's Whistle; Percy and the Trousers; Henry's Sneeze	Henry has been having a lot of problems. He cannot steam properly, and so is often ill. The Fat Controller tries to solve the problem with expensive Welsh coal. When Henry has an accident, the Fat Controller decides to solve the problems once and for all by sending Henry to Crewe Works. Henry returns with a new shape and a much better outlook on life and enjoys a number of adventures with the other engines.	Edmund Ward Ltd
7	Toby the Tram Engine	C. Reginald Dalby	26 July 1952	Toby and the Stout Gentleman; Thomas in Trouble; Dirty Objects; Mrs. Kyndley's Christmas	Thomas is having trouble with the police by traveling to Ffarquhar Quarry without cowcatchers and side-plates to cover his wheels. The Fat Controller realises that there is a solution. While on holiday with his wife and two grandchildren, he met a tram engine named Toby, who together with his coach Henrietta, has been having problems of his own with his railway in East Anglia closing down.	Edmund Ward Kaye & Ward
8	Gordon the Big Engine	C. Reginald Dalby	19 June 1953	Off the Rails; Leaves; Down the Mine; Paint Pots and Queens	Gordon has an accident by means of being lazy and careless, and so is taken off passenger duties. He helps the other engines out when they get into trouble and is eventually judged to be sensible enough to pull the Royal Train.	Edmund Ward Kay & Ward
9	Edward the Blue Engine	C. Reginald Dalby	23 November 1954	Cows; Bertie's Chase; Saved from Scrap; Old Iron	Edward is the oldest and wisest engine on Sodor. He is also kind and sensible. In the book, Edward is long overdue for an overhaul. However, he shows that he is far from useless and can teach the bigger engines a thing or two.	Edmund Ward Kay & Ward
10	Four Little Engines	C. Reginald Dalby	22 November 1955	Skarloey Remembers; Sir Handel; Peter Sam and the Refreshment Lady; Old Faithful	Rheneas is away being overhauled, and the Skarloey Railway has recently acquired two new engines: Sir Handel and Peter Sam. Peter Sam is naïve but well-meaning, but Sir Handel is rude and arrogant. Skarloey shows Sir Handel how to do things when he rescues the pompous engine's train.	Edmund Ward Kay & Ward
11	Percy the Small Engine	C. Reginald Dalby	1 January 1956	Percy and the Signal; Duck Takes Charge; Percy and Harold; Percy's Promise	Percy loves playing jokes, which sometimes gets him into trouble with the bigger engines, so the Fat Controller obtains a new engine called Montague, who's nicknamed "Duck", to do shunting work and sends Percy to work with Thomas and Toby on their branch line. He meets Harold the Helicopter and saves the day during a flood.	Edmund Ward Kay & Ward
12	The Eight Famous Engines	John T. Kenney	15 September 1957	Percy Takes the Plunge; Gordon Goes Foreign; Double Header; The Fat Controller's Engines	The Fat Controller's eight engines have become famous through their appearances in books and on the radio. While the engines enjoy a number of adventures and misadventures, the Fat Controller arranges for them to go to London.	Edmund Ward Kay & Ward
13	Duck and the Diesel Engine	John T. Kenney	23 June 1958	Domeless Engines; Pop Goes the Diesel; Dirty Work; A Close Shave	Duck has settled in well on Sodor, so much so that the other engines are getting a little tired of his know-it-all attitude and new-found pride on the Great Western Railway following a visit from the City of Truro. They are pleased when a smooth-talking diesel engine – simply known as just "Diesel" – visits to help out. When Duck shows him up, Diesel vows revenge, and starts spreading malicious lies about Duck (forcing him to be sent away). Luckily, Sir Topham Hatt has a plan to clear Duck's name.	Edmund Ward Kay & Ward
14	The Little Old Engine	John T. Kenney	1 January 1959	Trucks!; Home at Last; Rock 'n' Roll; Little Old Twins	This book continues the adventures of the Skarloey Railway. Skarloey returns from being overhauled to discover that there are two new engines on the railway. Rusty is a diesel engine who is friendly and helpful, but Duncan is a steam engine who is stubborn, careless, and rude. Sir Handel is still his old self. A television crew comes to film a documentary on the railway, and Skarloey starts telling them about the Talyllyn Railway.	Edmund Ward Kay & Ward
15	The Twin Engines	John T. Kenney	15 September 1960	"Hullo Twins!"; The Missing Coach; Break Van; The Deputation	The Fat Controller orders one engine from Scotland to help out with the goods work but is surprised when two engines arrive instead. To confuse matters further, the engines claim not to know their British Railways numbers 57646 and 57647, or which of them should have been sent. The engines are Donald and Douglas and are twins. As whichever one of them is sent back to Scotland will be scrapped, they are determined to stay. Despite some misadventures, the other engines convince the Fat Controller to keep both of them.	Edmund Ward Kay & Ward
16	Branch Line Engines	John T. Kenney	15 September 1961	Thomas Comes to Breakfast; Daisy; Bulls Eyes; Percy's Predicament	Thomas has an accident by trashing the Stationmaster's breakfast (due to a careless cleaner) and has to be sent to the Works. The Fat Controller orders a diesel railcar named Daisy to help out in his absence. Daisy is rather vain, neurotic, and convinced she knows it all, and decides that she is only going to do the work she wants. After a stern talking to and an accident by Percy, she is allowed to stay, with the encouragement of Toby. At the end of the book, Thomas comes back repaired.	Edmund Ward Kay & Ward
17	Gallant Old Engine	John T. Kenney	1 January 1962	Special Funnel; Steam-roller; Passengers and Polish; Gallant Old Engine	After his accident with slate trucks, Peter Sam loses his old funnel and gets a new one to improve his steaming. Sir Handel has been given new wheels but soon gets into a fight with a rude steamroller named George. Duncan is jealous and feels overworked. Skarloey is shocked at this and tells the others about the time when Rheneas saved the railway, eventually changing Duncan's attitude. At the end of the book, Rheneas returns from his overhaul.	Edmund Ward Kay & Ward
18	Stepney the "Bluebell" Engine	Peter and Gunvor Edwards	15 August 1963	Bluebells of England; Stepney's Special; Train Stops Play; Bowled Out	Percy is depressed to learn that steam engines on the Other Railway are being scrapped to make way for new diesels, and so he and Douglas are glad when he hears that the Bluebell Railway has saved a number of them. Stepney, from the Bluebell Railway, comes to visit and soon makes friends with the engines, even teaching a boastful visiting diesel a lesson or two.	Edmund Ward Kay & Ward
19	Mountain Engines	Peter and Gunvor Edwards	15 August 1964	Mountain Engine; Bad Look-out; Danger Points; "Devil's Back"	The Skarloey Railway engines meet Culdee, a strange-looking engine who climbs a mountain. He tells them all about his railway, and the tragic story of Godred, before returning home. At home, he meets the reckless Lord Harry, who causes trouble through his risk-taking, but when a climber runs into trouble, Lord Harry has an opportunity to redeem himself.	Edmund Ward Kay & Ward
20	Very Old Engines	Peter and Gunvor Edwards	15 June 1965	Crosspatch; Bucking Bronco; Stick-in-the-Mud; Duck and Dukes	Skarloey and Rheneas were celebrating their 100th birthday. Skarloey tells Nancy and other friends the story of his early life on the Skarloey Railway.	Edmund Ward Kay & Ward
21	Main Line Engines	Peter and Gunvor Edwards	15 November 1966	The Diseasel; Buzz, Buzz; Wrong Road; Edward's Exploit	The Main Line engines had more adventures on the Fat Controller's Railway. The narrator introduces readers to Bill and Ben the tank engine twins, and a new diesel named BoCo arrives. Gordon and James both run into trouble, but Edward surprises everyone by getting a train home despite breaking down.	Edmund Ward Kay & Ward
22	Small Railway Engines	Peter and Gunvor Edwards	1 August 1967	Ballast; Tit for Tat; Mike's Whistle; Useful Railway	The Fat Controller has been using a special new kind of ballast, which Donald and Douglas say it is brought by "verra wee engines". Duck is intrigued and goes to see what the fuss is about. He discovers a miniature railway with three small engines named Mike, Rex and Bert. The focus then shifts to the small engines themselves, and some of the adventures they have.	Edmund Ward Kay & Ward
23	Enterprising Engines	Peter and Gunvor Edwards	4 October 1968	Tenders for Henry; Super Rescue; Escape; Little Western	Gordon is sad to learn that steam has ended on the Other Railway, and more so when he hears his siblings of the LNER Gresley Classes A1 and A3 have almost all been scrapped. To cheer him up, the Fat Controller brings his only surviving brother, the Flying Scotsman to Sodor. Henry is jealous because of Flying Scotsman's two tenders (due to the long distances between coal depots and water towers on Flying Scotsman's railway) and is shown up by Duck but comes to the rescue of two failed diesels despite failing himself. Meanwhile, Douglas saves a tank engine named Oliver and his rolling stock (Isabel and Toad) accomplices from scrap. The Fat Controller announces that Oliver can stay, along with diesel engine D7101 (named Bear), and that he is reopening a branch line for Duck and Oliver. Furthermore, he announces that he will never replace his steam engines with diesels.	Edmund Ward Kay & Ward
24	Oliver the Western Engine	Peter and Gunvor Edwards	15 November 1969	Donald's Duck; Resource and Sagacity; Toad Stands By; Bulgy	Life was exciting on the Little Western. Duck and Donald play practical jokes on each other with a duck. Oliver, attempting to look important, loses the respect of trucks after an accident, but regains it with the help of Toad. Finally, a lying bus named Bulgy is put in his place after trying to steal the railway's passengers.	Kaye & Ward LTD
25	Duke the Lost Engine	Peter and Gunvor Edwards	15 October 1970	Granpuff; Bulldog; You Can't Win!; Sleeping Beauty	Duke was a dignified but affectionate old engine who ran on the Mid Sodor Railway with Falcon and Stuart, who are better known nowadays as Sir Handel and Peter Sam. Despite his age, Duke was useful and well-loved by the people who visited his line but when the line closed, nobody wanted to buy him, and he was left behind in the engine shed whilst Falcon and Stuart were sold on. Over the following years, his shed was buried by a landslide and he was forgotten except by his old engine colleagues. The Fat Clergyman, the Thin Clergyman and the Small Controller led an expedition to find him, and eventually he is rescued and sent to live on the Skarloey Railway with his old friends.	Kaye & Ward LTD
26	Tramway Engines	Peter and Gunvor Edwards	15 October 1972	Ghost Train; Woolly Bear; Mavis; Toby's Tightrope	This book focuses on Thomas' branch line. Percy plays a trick on Thomas, but later runs into trouble himself. Meanwhile, the Fat Controller has hired Mavis, a diesel engine working for the Ffarquhar Quarry Company, to help out while Thomas is absent, but Mavis is very headstrong and thinks Toby is an old fusspot. She pays no attention to his advice and causes a great deal of trouble, but eventually comes to Toby's rescue when his heavy load pushes him across a crumbling bridge.	Kaye & Ward LTD

== By Christopher Awdry ==
Wilbert Awdry's son, Christopher, had some background in writing when he took over writing the Railway Series books, having written a number of articles for Steam Railway magazine. He was inspired to write some Railway Series stories by a visit to the Nene Valley Railway, with encouragement from his father. The publishers were eager for new books, as the television adaptation was in production at the time, and Christopher Awdry became the second Railway Series author.

No.	Title	Illustrator	Date	Stories	Plot	Publisher
27	Really Useful Engines	Clive Spong	12 September 1983	Stop Thief!; Mind that Bike; Fish; Triple-Header	Thomas helps arrest a thief, Percy accidentally destroys a postman's bike, and Duck acts as a bank engine and has an accident with Henry's train due to a lamp falling off. It concludes with the three tank engines triple heading the Express when Gordon is under repair.	Kaye & Ward
28	James and the Diesel Engines	Clive Spong	17 September 1984	Old Stuck-Up; Crossed Lines; Fire Engine; Deep Freeze	James is one of the only engines who still does not trust diesels, which is not helped by the visit of a pompous diesel engine. He has a number of misadventures, but after a breakdown it is a diesel who helps him out, and he realises that diesel engines are not so bad after all.	Kaye & Ward William Heinemann, Ltd.
29	Great Little Engines	Clive Spong	28 October 1985	Patience is a Virtue; Peter Sam and the Prickly Problem; "Pop" Special; Sir Handel Comes Home	Duke has been mended and the Thin Controller sends Sir Handel to the Talyllyn Railway to help out while Talyllyn is being mended. While he is away, brambles and hot weather cause problems for the Skarloey Railway engines to solve. Sir Handel returns and tells them all about his adventures.	Kaye & Ward William Heinemann, Ltd.
30	More About Thomas the Tank Engine	Clive Spong	22 September 1986	Thomas, Percy and the Coal; The Runaway; Better Late than Never; Drip Tank	Thomas and Percy fall out after an incident with coal. Thomas runs away after a brake problem, and picks up Bertie the bus' passengers after the latter broke down. Percy and Thomas would reconcile after Thomas develops a leaking water tank.	Kaye & Ward William Heinemann, Ltd.
31	Gordon the High-Speed Engine	Clive Spong	7 September 1987	High-Speed Gordon; Smokescreen; Fire Escape; Gordon Proves His Point	Gordon is jealous when Donald tells him about High Speed Trains on the Other Railway. He tries to copy them, but ends up slipping helplessly on the rails. He is then blamed for ruining wedding clothes with his smoke, and is well and truly in disgrace. But he manages to get the Express home after his firebars collapsed, and the Fat Controller forgives him. He also apologises – it transpires the spoiled wedding clothes were not Gordon's fault. He is then allowed to take a special train to Carlisle and a High Speed Train named Pip & Emma arrives to assist while he is away. At last, Gordon is allowed to show how fast he is.	Kaye & Ward William Heinemann, Ltd.
32	Toby, Trucks and Trouble	Clive Spong	19 September 1988	Mavis and the Lorry; Toby's Seaside Holiday; Bulstrode; Toby Takes the Road	The engines who work at Ffarquhar quarry have a number of adventures. Mavis has an accident, and so Toby and Percy have to help out more than usual. Toby remembers an event from the days before he came to the Fat Controller's Railway. The trucks manage to do a good turn when they accidentally put in his place a disagreeable barge named Bulstrode. Terence does the shunting for Percy and boasts about it, while adding that steam engines ploughed fields and ran on roads in the past. To add to that, on the day Mavis is due back from the Works, Toby has an accident at the crossing and briefly runs on the road like Trevor.	Kaye & Ward William Heinemann, Ltd.
33	Thomas and the Twins	Clive Spong	11 September 1989	Scrambled Eggs; What a Picture!; Trevor Helps Out; Down the Drain	Repair work on Thomas's branch line means that he is sent to help on Edward's, which means he has to work with Bill and Ben (SCC 1 and 2) at the china clay pits. Although the twins tease him at first, he soon earns their respect.	Kaye & Ward William Heinemann, Ltd.
34	Jock the New Engine	Clive Spong	6 August 1990	We Need Another Engine; Sticking Power; Jock; Teamwork	The Arlesdale Railway builds a new engine to handle increased traffic. The Railway's own workshops build a strong new engine called Jock, who at first thinks himself superior to the others, but rescues a broken-down Mike.	Kaye & Ward William Heinemann, Ltd.
35	Thomas and the Great Railway Show	Clive Spong	12 August 1991	Museum-Piece; Not the Ticket; Trouble on the Line; Thomas and the Railtour	Thomas is excited because the National Railway Museum at York have invited him to visit. He makes many new friends among the engines of the National Collection and has a few adventures along the way. He saves a train when he spots a landslide, and is made an honorary member of the National Collection.	Kaye & Ward William Heinemann, Ltd.
36	Thomas Comes Home	Clive Spong	15 June 1992	Snow Problem; Washout!; Toby's Megatrain; Thomas Comes Home	While Thomas is away at the National Railway Museum, his branch is left in the care of Percy, Toby and Daisy. Daisy finds herself battling a snowstorm, Percy causes the bridge at Hackenbeck to collapse, and Toby takes more trucks than he can handle. On the day Thomas is due to come home, George leaves his cones at Dryaw Crossing, allowing one to stop Daisy. Everything is worked out when Thomas comes home.	Kaye & Ward William Heinemann, Ltd.
37	Henry and the Express	Clive Spong	8 April 1993	Out of Puff; Overhaul; Sliding Scales; Henry Sees Red	Henry is due for an overhaul. Other engines help with his duties while he is away (for example, James hauls The Flying Kipper), but when there is no engine to take the Express, Henry (who has a red undercoat) is called back early and proves once again that he is a "Really Useful Engine".	Kaye & Ward William Heinemann, Ltd.
38	Wilbert the Forest Engine	Clive Spong	8 August 1994	Percy's Porridge; Cab over Wheels; Foaming at the Funnel; Wired-up	Donald and Douglas are overworked. The Fat Controller arranges to borrow an engine called Wilbert from the Dean Forest Railway in Gloucestershire to help out. He tells Thomas and Toby the story of Sixteen, has his tank filled with milk rather than water and pulls a truck using wire.	Kaye & Ward William Heinemann, Ltd.
39	Thomas and the Fat Controller's Engines	Clive Spong	1 August 1995	Birdstrike; Edward and the Cabbages; Rabbits; Golden Jubilee	The Fat Controller prepares a celebration of the fiftieth anniversary of the Railway Series. Gordon strikes a crow, Edward loses a wheel, Thomas is derailed by some rabbits and a spider's web short circuits in the signal box at Knapford Junction. Despite these setbacks, the celebration succeeds and Pip and Emma bring a royal guest to the event.	Kaye & Ward William Heinemann, Ltd.
40	New Little Engine	Clive Spong	8 August 1996	Speedkiller; Sir Handel's Plan; Dirty Water; I Name This Engine...	Peter Sam is sent to the Talyllyn Railway, and the Skarloey Railyway builds a new engine. Peter Sam returns and the new engine is christened as Ivo Hugh, after the railway's chief engineer.	Kaye & Ward William Heinemann, Ltd.
41	Thomas and Victoria	Clive Spong	3 September 2007	Overloaded; Avalanche; Eels on Wheels; Toby's Vintage Train	Henrietta is damaged after a near-collision. Thomas discovers old coach named Victoria, hidden in a station. Victoria is sent for repairs and talks with Edward about their past on the Furness Railway, Daisy the railcar blows a fuse after seeing eels, and Victoria is brought into service with Toby's Vintage Train.	Egmont Publishing
42	Thomas and his Friends	Clive Spong	6 July 2011	Thomas and the Swan; Buffer Bashing; Gordon's Fire Service; Centenary	Thomas rescues an injured swan, Donald crashes in a siding due to icy rails, Gordon puts out a fire, and the railway celebrates series author Wilbert Awdry's 100th anniversary. Pip and Emma take over express duties for Gordon who is retired.	Egmont Publishing

== Railway Series-related books ==
There have been several Railway Series-related books published which were written by the Awdrys, but which are not actually part of the Railway Series proper. Nevertheless, they complement the original books and are considered canon.

=== The Annuals ===
For 1979 and 1980, the Thomas the Tank Engine and Friends annuals were written by Rev. W. Awdry, and from 1985 to 1996 by Christopher Awdry. They included several stories and articles about the characters. In some cases, these stories expanded upon earlier Railway Series books and in others they were entirely new. One, 'The Strawberry Special' in the 1985 Annual, was later rewritten and used in Thomas Comes Home as 'Toby's Megatrain'.

A number of new characters were introduced in the annuals. Perhaps the most notable was Algy the Bus, a friend of Bertie's. Also, Henry's Driver's name is revealed to be Ted in one of the later annuals.

=== Thomas's Christmas Party ===
- Published 29 October 1984
- Written by Rev. W. Awdry
- Illustrated by Clive Spong

A one-off story written especially for the television series – the only Rev. W. Awdry-authored story to be so written. The engines hold a special Christmas celebration for Mrs Kyndley.

=== Thomas Comes to Breakfast ===
- Published 2 September 1985
- Written by Rev. W. Awdry
- Illustrated by Clive Spong

An expanded version of the first story from Branch Line Engines, which also summarises the remainder of that book.

=== Thomas and the Missing Christmas Tree ===
- Published 20 October 1986
- Written by Christopher Awdry
- Illustrated by Clive Spong

This story was also written for the television series and was used in the 2nd series. Thomas the Tank Engine is sent to fetch a Christmas tree, but runs into a snowdrift. It is up to Donald and Douglas to save the day for him.

=== Thomas and the Evil Diesel ===
- Published 5 October 1987
- Written by Christopher Awdry
- Illustrated by Clive Spong

When Percy has to go to the Works for repairs, Diesel returns to Sodor and, as expected, causes trouble for the engines by destroying the oldest truck in Ffarqhuar Yards, but two days later, Thomas has an accident when Daisy drips her oil on the track and Clarabel's back wheels come off the tracks at the special points at Dryaw, so Diesel comes to the rescue. It seems that even Diesel has some good in him somewhere.

==== Notes ====
- In the United States, this book was published with the title Thomas and the Naughty Diesel. A later version with illustrations similar to the My-First models was released under the title Thomas and Diesel.
- This book marks Diesel's second visit to Sodor.
- Diesel was the only engine available to come to Sodor in this book, a device that Britt Allcroft would use in the TV series (this book was also written at her request, despite not being adapted).
- This is Clarabel's first accident.
- Three of Clive Spong's illustrations from this book would be modified for the Railway Series books Thomas And The Great Railway Show, Thomas Comes Home, and Thomas And The Fat Controller's Engines.
- The special points scenario of the book would inspire Christopher Awdry to write the 1991 Annual story Near Miss, which would explain to readers why special points are important to the railway.

=== Thomas and Gordon Off The Rails ===
- Published 3 September 1990
- Written by Christopher Awdry
- Illustrated by Stephen Lings

Gordon falls into a ditch, and, after teasing him about it, Thomas falls down a mine.

=== Thomas and the Hurricane ===
- Published 16 March 1992
- Written by Christopher Awdry
- Illustrated by Stephen Lings

A hurricane hits Sodor, causing chaos for the engines.

=== Bad Days for Thomas and His Friends / More Bad Days for Thomas and His Friends ===
- Published 2001
- Written by Christopher Awdry
- Illustrated by David Anderson

A pair of books written to highlight rail safety using characters from the Railway Series. They were written partially due to Christopher Awdry's frustration at not being able to include a proper rail safety story in his 1991 Railway Series book Thomas and the Great Railway Show ("published 10 years before").

==== Bad Days for Thomas and His Friends stories ====
- New Paint for Annie and Clarabel – Some boys are caught spraying graffiti around the station and on the 2 coaches.
- A Near Miss for Daisy – Some children on Thomas's branch line have been causing trouble throwing rocks at the trains and placing objects on the rails, one of which Daisy almost has a run-in with.
- Lucy to the Rescue – A boy named Andrew is riding his bike along the railway when one of his tires gets stuck between 2 rail joints. His dog Lucy runs ahead and warns Thomas, who was approaching with a train.

==== More Bad Days for Thomas and His Friends stories ====
- Toby and the Skateboarders – A boy has a near miss when he falls off the station platform while skateboarding near Toby.
- Nearly an Unhappy Christmas – A girl named Alysha's new hat blows off and is stuck between some electric railway wires. An engine and his driver stop her just before she reaches out to get it.
- Trouble on the Train – Two naughty girls push a girl named Gemma out of Annie and run off just before the train was due to leave. Thomas, Annie and Clarabel think Gemma should report the names of the other girls.

==== Notes ====
- Policeman Len appears in every story, disciplining or helping the children as needed.
- The Peel Godred branch appears in the story Nearly an Unhappy Christmas, as well as one of its engines, who has yet to be named.
- Colouring book versions of the two books were produced by Virgin Trains for children to colour in during their train journeys.

== Companion volumes ==
=== The Island of Sodor: Its People, History and Railways ===
- Published 1987
- Written by Rev. W. Awdry and George Awdry
- Illustrated by Clive Spong

This is a book about the Island of Sodor, dealing with its history, geography and industry in far greater depth than could ever be discussed in the Railway Series stories themselves. Most of the background information on the places, people, railways and engines in the Railway Series comes from this book.

The book came about as a result of Rev. W. Awdry's desire to create a credible and consistent world for his stories. This began with maps of Sodor, and was then expanded upon. Rev. W. Awdry and his brother George (who was the librarian of the National Liberal Club) worked out details of Sodor, producing between them a comprehensive set of notes. These notes were compiled and published in this book.

=== The Thomas the Tank Engine Man ===
- Published 1995
- Written by Brian Sibley

A biography of Rev. W. Awdry and companion to the series. Although it is not officially a Railway Series publication, it includes a great deal of background information on the series from the Awdrys.

=== Sodor: Reading Between the Lines ===
- Published 2005
- Written by Christopher Awdry

This book is a companion volume to the Railway Series, providing comprehensive biographies of the characters within the books and exploring the origins of the stories. Like The Island of Sodor: Its People, History and Railways, it included aspects of the fictional universe that were never featured in the Railway Series stories. It described the fictional developments on the railway since 1996.

An updated edition was released in 2025.

== Unpublished books ==
In a 2026 interview, Christopher Awdry mentioned he had written a book focusing on an engine named Barry, however the publisher at the time turned it down and instead requested a book focusing on Thomas. One of the stories for the intended book featuring James would however be later published.
