= Stephen Lings =

English artist and author

Stephen Lings (31 May 1961 - 30 March 2024) was an English wildlife artist, illustrator, author and conservationist. He illustrated many newspapers, magazines and books, including some companion books to The Railway Series.

In 2023, Stephen Lings was awarded the Marsh Award for Entomology, which "recognises individuals working with any invertebrate family that have made outstanding contributions to entomological science."
