= Wisbech railway station =

Wisbech railway station may refer to one of several railway stations that served the town of Wisbech in Cambridgeshire, England:

- Wisbech North railway station
- Wisbech East railway station
- Wisbech railway station (Upwell Tramway)
- A proposed station to be built on any revived March to Wisbech railway service; see Bramley Line
