= John T. Kenney =

English illustrator who worked on Railway Series

- Born: John Theodore Eardley Kenney; 16 May 1911; Leicester, Leicestershire, England
- Died: 27 November 1972 (aged 61)
- Occupation: Illustrator
- Years active: 1954–1972
- Spouse: Peggy Kenney

John Theodore Eardley Kenney (16 May 1911 – 27 November 1972) was an English illustrator who worked on several of Reverend Wilbert Awdry's The Railway Series books from 1957 to 1962.

== Introduction ==
Kenney was born on 16 May 1911 and trained at the Leicester College of Art, the same school that produced Clarence Reginald Dalby, the third illustrator of the Railway Series. Upon graduation he was employed by J.E. Slater, a firm of commercial artists located in Leicester. Kenney served with the 44th Searchlight Regiment and the 121st Light Anti-Aircraft Regiment during World War II. He landed in Normandy on D-Day, and although he was not officially a war artist he recorded the scenes he saw in a number of impromptu drawings. He continued to draw what he saw as his regiment swept across Europe with the rest of the Allied contingent. After the war, he returned to Leicester, resuming work at J.E. Slater. It was at that time that he met his future wife, Peggy. In 1957 Kenney quit his position, choosing to work as a full-time freelance artist.

As a full-time artist, Kenney became mentor to Neil Cawthorne. Neil is a well known equestrian artist, painting official pictures for the Grand National steeple chase, and the Prince of Wales, playing polo. Neil started the Society of Equestrian Artists.

== Contributions as illustrator ==
Awdry's choice of Kenney as a replacement for C. Reginald Dalby has been considered a fortuitous one. Kenney brought a lightness of touch and a naturalism to the illustrations that had been previously lacking. In the first book illustrated by Kenney, The Eight Famous Engines, Kenney's superb draftsmanship and his attention to detail are already obvious.

Kenney's last illustrations in the Railway Series were for 1962's Gallant Old Engine. By that time his eyesight was failing and he was unable to handle the fine details required for the series' illustrations.

He was replaced by Peter and Gunvor Edwards as illustrator for the Railway Series.

Before his retirement, Kenney also illustrated 31 children's books for the Leicester publisher Ladybird Books, including a series on important British historical figures, such as Charles Dickens, Florence Nightingale, and Queen Elizabeth I, as well as a 1956 book of motor vehicle characters that has an affinity with the Awdry books he was soon to work on. He also provided art for the Hunter Hawk, Skyway Detective series.

John T. Kenney died on 27 November 1972, at the age of 61.

== Books ==
=== W. Awdry's Railway Series (published by Edmund Ward) ===
- The Eight Famous Engines (1957)
- Duck and the Diesel Engine (1958)
- The Little Old Engine (1959)
- The Twin Engines (1960)
- Branch Line Engines (1961)
- Gallant Old Engine (1962)

=== Ladybird Books (published by Wills & Hepworth) ===
- The Silver Arrow – A Robin Hood Adventure (1954)
- The Ambush – A Robin Hood Adventure (1955)
- Tootles the Taxi and Other Rhymes (1956)
- King Alfred the Great (1956)
- William the Conqueror (1956)
- The Circus Comes to Town (1957)
- Sir Walter Raleigh (1957)
- The Story of Nelson (1957)
- The Story of the First Queen Elizabeth (1958)
- The Story of Captain Cook (1958)
- Florence Nightingale (1959)
- Julius Caesar and Roman Britain (1959)
- The Story of Charles II (1960)
- David Livingstone (1960)
- Stone Age Man in Britain (1961)
- Christopher Columbus (1961)
- Marco Polo (1962)
- The Story of Henry V (1962)
- Oliver Cromwell (1963)
- Captain Scott (1963)
- Alexander the Great (1963)
- Robert the Bruce (1964)
- Richard the Lion Heart (1965)
- Charles Dickens (1965)
- Warwick the Kingmaker (1966)
- Cleopatra and Ancient Egypt (1966)
- James I and the Gunpowder Plot (1967)
- Napoleon (1968)
- King John and Magna Carta (1969)
- Joan of Arc (1971)
- The Pilgrim Fathers (1972)
