= Christopher Awdry =

British writer (born 1940)

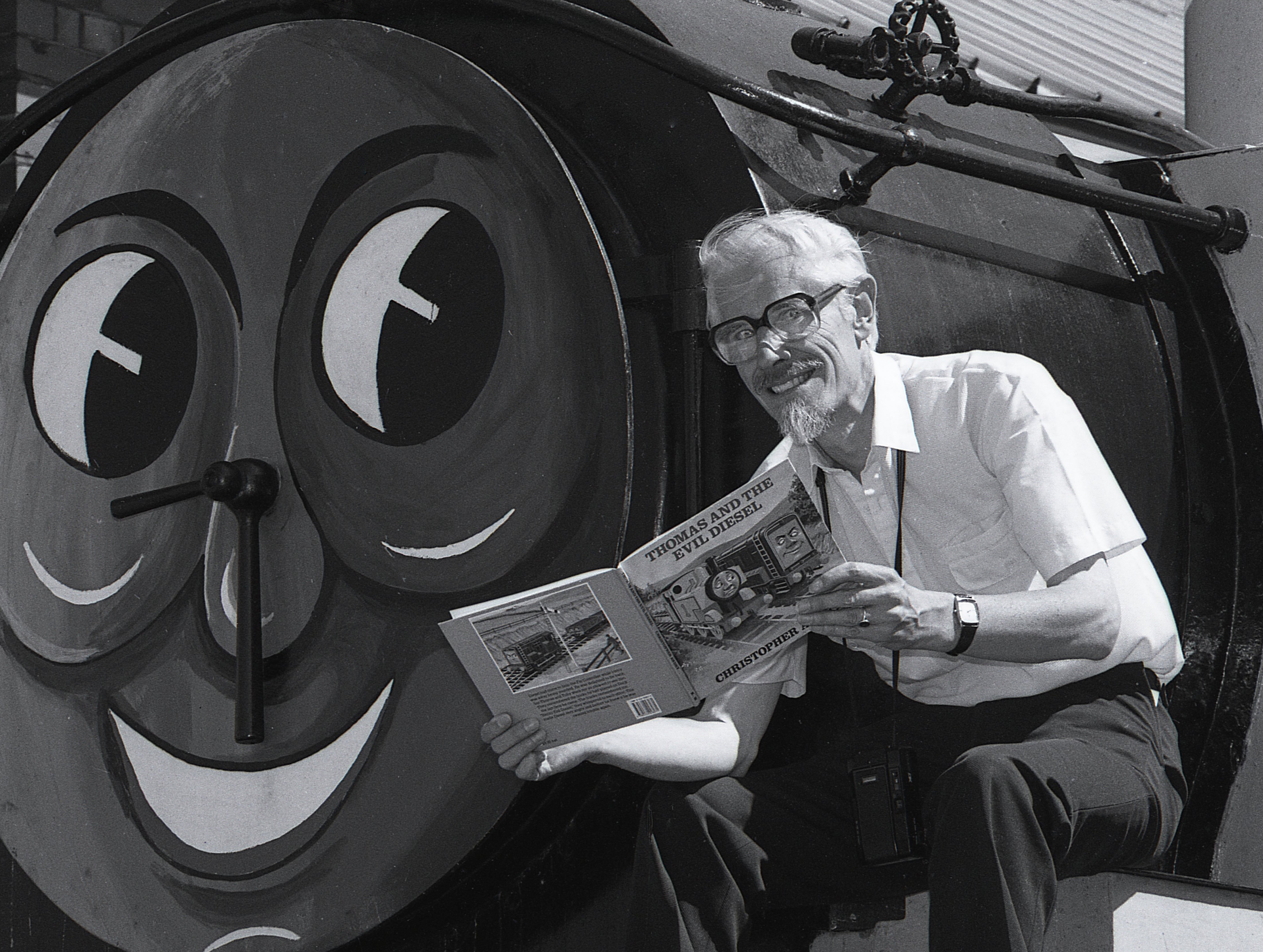
- Awdry at the National Railway Museum in York in 1987
- Born: Christopher Vere Awdry; 2 July 1940 (age 86); Devizes, Wiltshire, England
- Education: Worksop College
- Occupation: Author
- Years active: 1983–2011
- Notable work: Thomas the Tank Engine
- Parent(s): Wilbert Awdry (1911–1997); Margaret Wale (1912–1989)

Christopher Vere Awdry (born 2 July 1940) is an English author. He is best known for his contributions to The Railway Series of books featuring Thomas the Tank Engine, which was started by his father, Wilbert Awdry (1911–1997). He also produced children's books based on a number of other railways, as well as non-fiction articles and books on heritage railways. He was born at Devizes, the family moving to Kings Norton, Birmingham, when he was five months old. Awdry was educated at Worksop College, a public school in North Nottinghamshire.

== Christopher Awdry and The Railway Series ==
Christopher Awdry is in a way responsible for the creation of Thomas and The Railway Series, which started off as bedtime stories told to him by his father during a bout of measles in 1942. When his father retired in 1972, he wrote an additional 16 books for The Railway Series. The series came to be called Thomas The Tank Engine & Friends after that.

In 2006, the current publishers, Egmont Books, decided to reprint the entire series in their original form; the then-14 books by Christopher were re-released at the beginning of August 2007. His favourite character is Toby.

The new interest from the publishers has gone beyond merely re-releasing the existing books. Christopher Awdry has written a new book for the series, titled Thomas and Victoria, which focuses on stories relating to the railway preservation movement. This, the 41st book in the series, was released on 3 September 2007. In April 2010, Egmont Books confirmed that another Railway Series book, No. 42 in the series, would be published in 2011. The publication date was later confirmed as 4 July 2011, and the illustrator as Clive Spong. It was published under the title Thomas and His Friends. This book would become the final book in the Railway Series to be published.

== Other works ==
In 2001, Christopher Awdry wrote six stories featured in two books concerning railway safety, which were distributed to every primary school and library in the country (Bad Days for Thomas and His Friends / More Bad Days for Thomas and His Friends). The train operator Virgin Trains produced a colouring book for young passengers based on the stories.

A series of six books has been produced featuring locomotives from the Eastbourne Miniature Steam Railway, and illustrated by Marc Vyvyan-Jones.

== Bibliography ==
=== Railway Series volumes ===
- 27. Really Useful Engines (1983)
- 28. James and the Diesel Engines (1984)
- 29. Great Little Engines (1985)
- 30. More About Thomas the Tank Engine (1986)
- 31. Gordon the High Speed Engine (1987)
- 32. Toby, Trucks and Trouble (1988)
- 33. Thomas and the Twins (1989)
- 34. Jock the New Engine (1990)
- 35. Thomas and the Great Railway Show (1991)
- 36. Thomas Comes Home (1992)
- 37. Henry and the Express (1993)
- 38. Wilbert the Forest Engine (1994)
- 39. Thomas and the Fat Controller's Engines (1995)
- 40. New Little Engine (1996)
- 41. Thomas and Victoria (2007)
- 42. Thomas and His Friends (2011)

=== Other 'Thomas' books ===
- Thomas and the Missing Christmas Tree (1986)
- Thomas and the Evil Diesel (1987)
- Thomas and the Hurricane (1992)
- Sodor: Reading Between the Lines (2005, second edition 2025)

=== Thomas easy-to-read books ===
Published by Dean (Reed Children's Books), 1990–1997, illustrated by Ken Stott.
(Also published as Egmont 'mini books' (1997–1998))

- Thomas and the Tiger
- James and the Balloons
- Percy and the Kite
- Thomas and the Birthday Party
- Henry and the Ghost Train
- Thomas and the Dinosaurs
- Thomas and the Pony Show *
- Thomas goes to School *
- Henry Goes to the Hospital *
- Thomas the Tank Engine Easy-To-Read Treasury (1997) – incorporating the 3 titles marked * in a combined volume.

=== Eastbourne Series ===
- 01. General Takes Charge – illustrated by Marc Vyvyan-Jones
- 02. Rachel and the Goose – illustrated by Marc Vyvyan-Jones
- 03. Western and the Lost Ring – illustrated by Marc Vyvyan-Jones
- 04. Oily Keeps Things Going – illustrated by Marc Vyvyan-Jones
- 05. Eastbourne's Wedding Special – illustrated by Marc Vyvyan-Jones
- 06. Oily and the Flood – illustrated by Marc Vyvyan-Jones

=== Other railway stories ===
- Railway for Sale
- Luke Goes Flying – illustrated by Jonathan Clay
- LOTI and the Enchanted Forest
- LOTI and the Lost Locket
- The Chips Express
- Heave-Ho Hamish
- Hugh Goes Sliding

=== Non-fiction ===
- Awdry, Christopher (1990). Encyclopaedia of British Railway Companies. Sparkford: Patrick Stephens Ltd. ISBN 1-8526-0049-7. OCLC 19514063. CN 8983.
- Awdry, Christopher (1995). Awdry's steam railways. London: Boxtree. ISBN 0-7522-1600-7. OCLC 34723449.
- Awdry, Christopher (2001). The Nene Valley Railway. Kettering: Past & Present. ISBN 1-85895-170-4. OCLC 59557758.
