= The Railway Series =

British fictional book series

- English logo for The Railway Series (1945)
- Author: Wilbert Awdry (1945–72); Christopher Awdry (1983–2011)
- Illustrator: William Middleton (1945); Reginald Payne (1946); C. Reginald Dalby (1948–56); John T. Kenney (1957–62); Peter and Gunvor Edwards (1963–72); Clive Spong (1983–2011)
- Language: English
- Genre: Children's
- Publisher: Edmund Ward, Ltd. (1945–68); Kaye & Ward, Ltd. (1952–98); William Heinemann (1984–98); Egmont Group (1998–present)
- Publication date: May 1945 – July 2011
- Publication place: United Kingdom
- English publication date: May 1945 – July 2011

The Railway Series is a series of British children's books about the railways of the fictional Island of Sodor, including many anthropomorphic locomotives, the most famous being Thomas the Tank Engine. There are 42 books in the series, with 169 stories in total. Audio adaptations of The Railway Series have been recorded at various times under the title The Railway Stories.

The first book, The Three Railway Engines, was published on 12 May 1945 by Wilbert Awdry. Awdry wrote 26 books; the final one being Tramway Engines written in October 1972. His son, Christopher, wrote 16 more between September 1983 and July 2011 with the first being Really Useful Engines and the final one being Thomas and his Friends. The books were adapted into the television series Thomas & Friends from 1984 to 2021, which has been expanded into a media franchise.

Nearly all of The Railway Series stories were based on events in railway history. A railway enthusiast, Wilbert Awdry was keen that his stories should be as realistic as possible. The engine characters were mostly based upon real classes of locomotives, and some of the railways themselves were based upon lines in the British Isles.

== History ==
In 1943, Wilbert Awdry told stories about steam locomotives on the fictional Island of Sodor to his son, Christopher Awdry, who was sick with measles and confined to his bed at two years old. The stories were told to him numerous times, prompting Wilbert to write them down while Christopher noted any mistakes and inconsistencies. Wilbert's wife, Margaret, encouraged him to send the stories to publishing firms, many of whom rejected him. In September, Edmund Ward Ltd agreed to publish the stories for a fee of £25. The series' first book, The Three Railway Engines, was published in 1945; the book's release was delayed by paper shortages.

Wilbert went on to write 26 Railway Series books in total. The second book introduced Thomas the Tank Engine, who was based on a wooden toy Wilbert had made for Christopher as a Christmas present. Wilbert based some of his stories on his time volunteering at the Talyllyn Railway in the 1950s, beginning with Four Little Engines in 1955. Wilbert's final book was published in 1972, with Christopher writing more with his father's blessing eleven years later.

Christopher's son Richard Awdry, would appear at the Talyllyn Railway in 2025 to perform a Sodor history lecture alongside Tim Dunn. Christopher Awdry would return to the series for a revised 20th anniversary edition of Sodor: Reading Between the Lines later in 2025. Christopher would note in the book that he nor Richard had been approached to continue the series at any point since 2011's Thomas and His Friends and noted Richard's successful career as a musician (as guitarist of the post-metal band Final Coil), as reasons the series would be unlikely to continue.

== Illustrators ==
The Railway Series is perhaps as highly regarded for its illustrations as for its writing, which in the immediate post-Second World War era were seen as uniquely vivid and colourful. Indeed, some critics (notably Miles Kington) have claimed that the quality of the illustrations outshines that of the writing.

The first edition of The Three Railway Engines was illustrated by the artist William Middleton, with whom Awdry was deeply dissatisfied. The second artist to work on the series was Reginald Payne, who illustrated Thomas the Tank Engine in a far more realistic style. Despite an early disagreement as to how Thomas should look, Awdry was ultimately pleased with the pictures produced.

Payne later suffered a nervous breakdown and proved impossible to contact to illustrate James the Red Engine, so C. Reginald Dalby was hired. Dalby also illustrated the next eight books in the series. The Three Railway Engines was reprinted with Dalby's artwork replacing William Middleton's and Dalby also touched up Payne's artwork in the second book in 1949 and 1950, respectively. Dalby's work on the series proved popular with readers, but not with the author, who repeatedly clashed with him over issues of accuracy and consistency. Dalby resigned from the series in 1956, following an argument over the portrayal of Percy the Small Engine in the book of the same name. Awdry had built a model of Percy as a reference for the artist, but Dalby did not make use of it. Despite the tempestuous relationship with Awdry, Dalby is probably the best remembered of the series' artists.

With The Eight Famous Engines (1957), John T. Kenney took over the illustration of the series. His style was less colourful but more realistic than Dalby's. Kenney made use of Awdry's model engines as a reference. As a result of his commitment to realism and technical accuracy, he enjoyed a far more comfortable working relationship with Awdry, which lasted until Gallant Old Engine (1962), when Kenney's eyesight began to deteriorate.

The artist initially chosen to replace him was the Swedish artist Gunvor Edwards. She began illustrating Stepney the "Bluebell" Engine, but felt unsuited to the work. She was assisted for that volume by her husband Peter, who effectively took over from then on. Both artists retained credit for the work, and the "Edwards era" lasted until Wilbert Awdry's last volume, Tramway Engines. The style used in these volumes was still essentially realistic but had something of an impressionistic feel.

When Christopher took over as author of the series in 1983, the publisher was keen to find an illustrator who would provide work that had the gem-like appeal of Dalby's pictures, but also had the realism of Kenney and Edwards' artwork. The artist chosen was Clive Spong. He illustrated all of Christopher Awdry's books, a greater number than any other artist working on The Railway Series. He also produced illustrations for a number of spin-off stories written by the Awdrys, and his artwork was used in The Island of Sodor: Its People, History and Railways.

== Cameo appearances ==
The Awdrys both wrote about Sodor as if it were a real place that they visited, and that the stories were obtained first-hand. This was often "documented" in the foreword to each book. In some of W. Awdry's later books he appeared as the Thin Clergyman and was described as a writer, though his name and connections to the series were never made explicit. He was invariably accompanied by the Fat Clergyman, based on Teddy Boston, who was a fellow railway enthusiast and close friend. The two Clergymen were portrayed as railway enthusiasts, and were responsible for annoying the Small Engines and discovering Duke the Lost Engine. They were often figures of fun, liable to be splashed with water or to fall through a roof.

Awdry also appeared in a number of illustrations, usually as a joke on the part of the illustrator. In one illustration by John T. Kenney in Duck and the Diesel Engine he appears with a figure who bears a strong resemblance to C. Reginald Dalby, which Brian Sibley has suggested might be a dig at Dalby's inaccurate rendition of the character of Duck. A vicar appears in Edward the Blue Engine and other volumes as the owner of Trevor the Traction Engine. This may be a reference to Teddy Boston, who had himself saved a traction engine from scrap.

Dalby illustrated the entire Awdry family – Wilbert, Margaret, Christopher, Veronica and Hilary – watching Percy pass through a station ("Percy runs away" in Troublesome Engines (p53)). This was Christopher Awdry's only appearance in an illustration, but he often described meetings with the engines in the book forewords, usually with some degree of humour.

Other people associated with The Railway Series were also referenced. In Dalby's books, he made allusions to himself twice on store signs (Seen in Off the Rails and Saved from Scrap) and a reference to E.T.L. Marriott, who edited The Railway Series, in Percy Takes the Plunge on a "Ship Chandlers" company sign. Peter Edwards also notes that he based Gordon's face on Eric Marriot's.

The Fat Controller (originally The Fat Director in the earliest books which pre-dated the nationalisation of Britain's railways in 1948) was a fictional character, although Christopher Awdry has conceded that his doctor at the time may have provided an 'unconscious contribution' for his father. The Thin Controller, in charge of the narrow-gauge engines in the books was based on Mr Edward Thomas, the manager of the Talyllyn Railway in its last years before enthusiasts took it over in 1951.

A number of the stories are based on articles which appeared in railway enthusiast publications of the period. The monthly Railway Magazine was a long-running enthusiasts' companion and the origins of several stories can be recognised. The railway books written by C. Hamilton Ellis, were another source.

== Preservation movement ==
Awdry used the books to promote steam railways in the United Kingdom. The Skarloey Railway was based on the Talyllyn Railway in Wales, where he volunteered. The Skarloey books often included a promotion for the Talyllyn Railway, either in the stories themselves, or in a footnote or the foreword. Some of the illustrations in the books depict recognisable locations on the Talyllyn Railway.

From the 1980s onwards, the Talyllyn Railway occasionally repainted one of their locomotives to resemble its Skarloey Railway "twin". As well as paint schemes and names taken from the books' artwork, these locomotives are fitted with fibreglass "faces". These characters' appearances have been written into The Railway Series by Christopher Awdry in the form of visits by the fictional engines to the Talyllyn Railway.

Two other railways on Sodor are based on real railways: The Culdee Fell Railway is based on the Snowdon Mountain Railway and the Arlesdale Railway is based on the Ravenglass and Eskdale Railway in Cumbria.

From Duck and the Diesel Engine onwards, a number of real engines and railways were explicitly featured. Flying Scotsman, City of Truro, Stepney and Wilbert were all real locomotives that appeared in The Railway Series, the latter two having books dedicated to them: Stepney the "Bluebell" Engine and Christopher Awdry's Wilbert the Forest Engine. Wilbert's appearance was of particular significance as the locomotive was named in tribute to Wilbert Awdry who was the president of the Dean Forest Railway at the time.

In Thomas and the Great Railway Show, Thomas visited the National Railway Museum in York, and several of the museum's locomotives are featured including Mallard, Duchess of Hamilton, Stephenson's Rocket, Iron Duke and Green Arrow. At the end of this book, Thomas is made an honorary member of the National Collection.

== Books ==
The following table lists the titles of all 42 books in The Railway Series.

Author	Volume	Title	Publication	Characters' first appearance	Illustrator	Publisher
W. Awdry	1	The Three Railway Engines	12 May 1945	Edward · Gordon · Henry · The Fat Director	William Middleton (later redrawn by C. Reginald Dalby)	Edmund Ward, Ltd.
W. Awdry	2	Thomas the Tank Engine	14 September 1946	Thomas · James · Annie and Clarabel	Reginald Payne (later partially redrawn by C. Reginald Dalby)	Edmund Ward, Ltd.
W. Awdry	3	James the Red Engine	14 September 1948		C. Reginald Dalby	Edmund Ward, Ltd.
W. Awdry	4	Tank Engine Thomas Again	31 December 1949	Terence · Bertie	C. Reginald Dalby	Edmund Ward, Ltd.
W. Awdry	5	Troublesome Engines	15 January 1950	Percy	C. Reginald Dalby	Edmund Ward, Ltd.
W. Awdry	6	Henry the Green Engine	10 July 1951		C. Reginald Dalby	Edmund Ward, Ltd.
W. Awdry	7	Toby the Tram Engine	26 July 1952	Toby · Henrietta	C. Reginald Dalby	Edmund Ward, Ltd. Kaye & Ward, Ltd.
W. Awdry	8	Gordon the Big Engine	19 June 1953		C. Reginald Dalby	Edmund Ward, Ltd. Kaye & Ward, Ltd.
W. Awdry	9	Edward the Blue Engine	23 November 1954	Trevor	C. Reginald Dalby	Edmund Ward, Ltd. Kaye & Ward, Ltd.
W. Awdry	10	Four Little Engines	22 November 1955	Skarloey · Rheneas · Sir Handel · Peter Sam · Thin Controller · The Owner · Carriages: Agnes, Ruth, Lucy, Jemima, Beatrice · Mrs. Last	C. Reginald Dalby	Edmund Ward, Ltd. Kaye & Ward, Ltd.
W. Awdry	11	Percy the Small Engine	1 January 1956	Duck · Harold	C. Reginald Dalby	Edmund Ward, Ltd. Kaye & Ward, Ltd.
W. Awdry	12	The Eight Famous Engines	15 September 1957	The Foreign Engine · Jinty and Pug	John T. Kenney	Edmund Ward, Ltd. Kaye & Ward, Ltd.
W. Awdry	13	Duck and the Diesel Engine	23 June 1958	City of Truro · Diesel	John T. Kenney	Edmund Ward, Ltd. Kaye & Ward, Ltd.
W. Awdry	14	The Little Old Engine	1 January 1959	Rusty · Duncan · Carriages: Cora, Ada, Jane, Mabel, Gertrude, Millicent	John T. Kenney	Edmund Ward, Ltd. Kaye & Ward, Ltd.
W. Awdry	15	The Twin Engines	15 September 1960	Donald and Douglas · Spiteful Brake Van	John T. Kenney	Edmund Ward, Ltd. Kaye & Ward, Ltd.
W. Awdry	16	Branch Line Engines	15 September 1961	Daisy	John T. Kenney	Edmund Ward, Ltd. Kaye & Ward, Ltd.
W. Awdry	17	Gallant Old Engine	1 January 1962	George the Steamroller · Nancy the Guard's Daughter	John T. Kenney	Edmund Ward, Ltd. Kaye & Ward, Ltd.
W. Awdry	18	Stepney the "Bluebell" Engine	15 August 1963	Stepney · Engines at the Bluebell Railway · Caroline the car · The Diesel/D4711	Peter and Gunvor Edwards	Edmund Ward, Ltd. Kaye & Ward, Ltd.
W. Awdry	19	Mountain Engines	15 August 1964	Culdee · Ernest · Wilfred · Godred · Lord Harry · Alaric · Eric · Catherine · The Truck · Lord Harry Barrane · Mr Walter Richards	Peter and Gunvor Edwards	Edmund Ward, Ltd. Kaye & Ward, Ltd.
W. Awdry	20	Very Old Engines	15 June 1965	Neil	Peter and Gunvor Edwards	Edmund Ward, Ltd. Kaye & Ward, Ltd.
W. Awdry	21	Main Line Engines	15 November 1966	BoCo · Bill and Ben	Peter and Gunvor Edwards	Edmund Ward, Ltd. Kaye & Ward, Ltd.
W. Awdry	22	Small Railway Engines	1 August 1967	Mike · Rex · Bert · Ballast Spreader · The Small Controller	Peter and Gunvor Edwards	Edmund Ward, Ltd. Kaye & Ward, Ltd.
W. Awdry	23	Enterprising Engines	4 October 1968	Flying Scotsman · D199 · Bear · Oliver · Toad · Isabel, Dulcie, Alice, Mirabel	Peter and Gunvor Edwards	Edmund Ward, Ltd. Kaye & Ward, Ltd.
W. Awdry	24	Oliver the Western Engine	15 November 1969	S.C. Ruffey · Bulgy	Peter and Gunvor Edwards	Kaye & Ward, Ltd.
W. Awdry	25	Duke the Lost Engine	15 October 1970	Duke · Falcon · Stuart · Stanley	Peter and Gunvor Edwards	Kaye & Ward, Ltd.
W. Awdry	26	Tramway Engines	15 October 1972	Mavis	Peter and Gunvor Edwards	Kaye & Ward, Ltd.
Christopher Awdry	27	Really Useful Engines	12 September 1983	Tom Tipper	Clive Spong	Kaye & Ward, Ltd.
Christopher Awdry	28	James and the Diesel Engines	17 September 1984	Old Stuck-up · The Works Diesel	Clive Spong	Kaye & Ward, Ltd. William Heinemann, Ltd.
Christopher Awdry	29	Great Little Engines	28 October 1985		Clive Spong	Kaye & Ward, Ltd. William Heinemann, Ltd.
Christopher Awdry	30	More About Thomas the Tank Engine	22 September 1986		Clive Spong	Kaye & Ward, Ltd. William Heinemann, Ltd.
Christopher Awdry	31	Gordon the High-Speed Engine	7 September 1987	Pip & Emma	Clive Spong	Kaye & Ward, Ltd. William Heinemann, Ltd.
Christopher Awdry	32	Toby, Trucks and Trouble	19 September 1988	The Old Engine · Bulstrode	Clive Spong	Kaye & Ward, Ltd. William Heinemann, Ltd.
Christopher Awdry	33	Thomas and the Twins	11 September 1989		Clive Spong	Kaye & Ward, Ltd. William Heinemann, Ltd.
Christopher Awdry	34	Jock the New Engine	6 August 1990	Arlesdale Railway engines: Frank · Jock	Clive Spong	Kaye & Ward, Ltd. William Heinemann, Ltd.
Christopher Awdry	35	Thomas and the Great Railway Show	12 August 1991	Engines at the National Railway Museum	Clive Spong	Kaye & Ward, Ltd. William Heinemann, Ltd.
Christopher Awdry	36	Thomas Comes Home	15 June 1992		Clive Spong	Kaye & Ward, Ltd. William Heinemann, Ltd.
Christopher Awdry	37	Henry and the Express	8 April 1993		Clive Spong	Kaye & Ward, Ltd. William Heinemann, Ltd.
Christopher Awdry	38	Wilbert the Forest Engine	8 August 1994	Wilbert · Sixteen	Clive Spong	Kaye & Ward, Ltd. William Heinemann, Ltd.
Christopher Awdry	39	Thomas and the Fat Controller's Engines	1 August 1995		Clive Spong	Kaye & Ward, Ltd. William Heinemann, Ltd.
Christopher Awdry	40	New Little Engine	8 August 1996	Fred · Kathy & Lizzie (cleaners) · Ivo Hugh	Clive Spong	Kaye & Ward, Ltd. William Heinemann, Ltd.
Christopher Awdry	41	Thomas and Victoria	3 September 2007	Victoria · Helena · Albert	Clive Spong	Egmont Publishing
Christopher Awdry	42	Thomas and His Friends	6 July 2011		Clive Spong	Egmont Publishing
