= Wilbert Awdry =

British author and vicar (1911–1997)

The Reverend Wilbert Awdry OBE
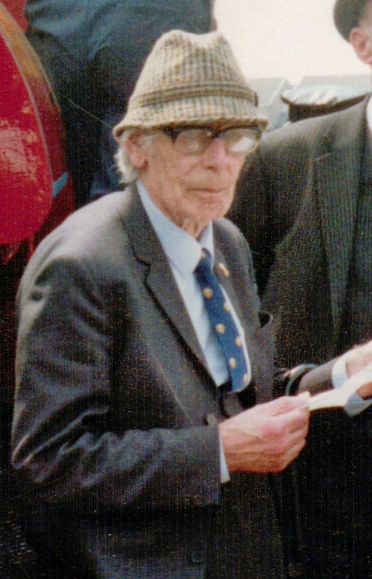
- Reverend Awdry in 1988
- Born: Wilbert Vere Awdry; 15 June 1911; Ampfield, Hampshire, England
- Died: 21 March 1997 (aged 85); Rodborough, Gloucestershire, England
- Education: St Peter's Hall, Oxford; Wycliffe Hall, Oxford
- Occupations: Anglican cleric; railway enthusiast; children's author
- Spouse: Margaret Wale (m. 1938; died 1989)
- Children: 3, including Christopher Awdry
- Writing career
- Years active: 1945–1972
- Genre: Children's literature
- Notable work: The Railway Series

Ecclesiastical career
- Religion: Christianity (Anglican)
- Church: Church of England
- Ordained: 1936 (deacon); 1939 (priest)

Wilbert Vere Awdry OBE (15 June 1911 – 21 March 1997), often credited as Rev. W. Awdry, was an English Anglican priest, railway enthusiast, and children's author. He was the creator of Thomas the Tank Engine and several other characters who appeared in his book series, The Railway Series.

== Early life and education ==
Wilbert Awdry was born at Ampfield vicarage near Romsey, Hampshire, on 15 June 1911. His father was Vere Awdry (1854–1928), the Church of England vicar of Ampfield, and his mother was Lucy Awdry (née Bury; 1884–1965). When Wilbert was born his mother Lucy Awdry described her newborn son as a "short (but perfectly formed) baby who had long fingers. and toes, a 'mouse-face' (with the Awdry chin and ears) and a loud and persistent voice." Vere Awdry was the son of judge Sir John Wither Awdry and brother of bishop William Awdry. Wilbert was derived from William and Herbert, names of his father's two brothers. His younger brother, George, was born on 10 August 1916 and died on 27 October 1994. All three of Awdry's older half-siblings from his father's first two marriages died young, the youngest being killed in World War I. As a toddler at Ampfield, he saw his father construct a handmade 40-yard (37 m), 2.5-inch-gauge (64 mm) model railway. In 1917, the family moved to Box, in Wiltshire, moving again within Box in 1919 and in 1920, the third house being "Journey's End" (renamed from "Lorne Villa"), which remained the family home until August 1928.

"Journey's End" was only 200 yards (180 m) from the western end of Box Tunnel, where the Great Western Railway main line climbs at a gradient of 1 in 100 for 2 miles (3.2 km). A banking engine was kept there to assist freight trains up the hill. Those trains usually ran at night, and the young Awdry could hear them from his bed, listening to the coded whistle signals between the train engine and the banker, as well as the sharp bark from the locomotive exhausts as they fought their way up the incline. When Awdry lay in bed he described the sound of the engines: "It needed little imagination", he wrote, "to hear, in the sounds the train engine and banking engine made, what they were saying to each other." "There was no doubt in my mind that steam engines all had definite personalities. I would hear them snorting up the grade and little imagination was needed to hear in the puffings and pantings of the two engines the conversation they were having with one another." There was the inspiration for the story of Edward helping Gordon's train up the hill, a story that Wilbert first told his son Christopher some 25 years later, and which appeared in the first of the Railway Series books.

Awdry was educated at Marlborough House School, Hawkhurst, Kent (1919–1924), Dauntsey's School, West Lavington, Wiltshire (1924–1929), St Peter's Hall, Oxford (BA, 1932), and Wycliffe Hall, Oxford, where he gained his diploma in theology in 1933.

== Career ==
Awdry taught for three years from 1933 to 1936 at St George's School, Jerusalem, then part of Mandatory Palestine. He was ordained to the Church of England diaconate in 1936 and subsequently the priesthood. In 1938, he married Margaret Emily Wale (1912 – 21 March 1989). In 1940, he took a curacy at St Nicolas Church, Kings Norton, Birmingham, where he lived until 1946. He subsequently moved to Cambridgeshire, serving as rector of Elsworth with Knapwell (1946–1950), rural dean at Bourn (1950–1953) and then vicar of Emneth, Norfolk (1953–1965). He retired from full-time ministry in 1965 and moved to Rodborough in Stroud, Gloucestershire.

== The Railway Series ==
The characters that would make Awdry known, and the first stories featuring them, were invented in 1942 to amuse his son Christopher during a bout of measles. After Awdry wrote The Three Railway Engines, he built Christopher a model of Thomas, and some wagons and coaches, out of a wooden broomstick and scraps of wood. Christopher also wanted a model of Gordon, but the wartime shortage of materials limited Awdry to making a little 0-6-0 tank engine. Awdry said, "The natural name was Thomas – Thomas the Tank Engine". Then Christopher requested stories about Thomas, which duly followed, and were published in 1946, in the book Thomas the Tank Engine.

The first book, The Three Railway Engines, was published in 1945 by Edmund Ward in Leicester. Awdry wrote 26 books in The Railway Series, the last in 1972. Christopher subsequently added further books to the series.

In 1947, 0-6-0T engine No. 1800 was built by Hudswell Clarke. It spent its working life at the British Sugar factory in Peterborough, pushing wagons of sugar beet, until it was finally replaced by a diesel engine. Peterborough Railway Society purchased the engine in 1973, and that little blue "Thomas" engine is the star of the Nene Valley Railway.

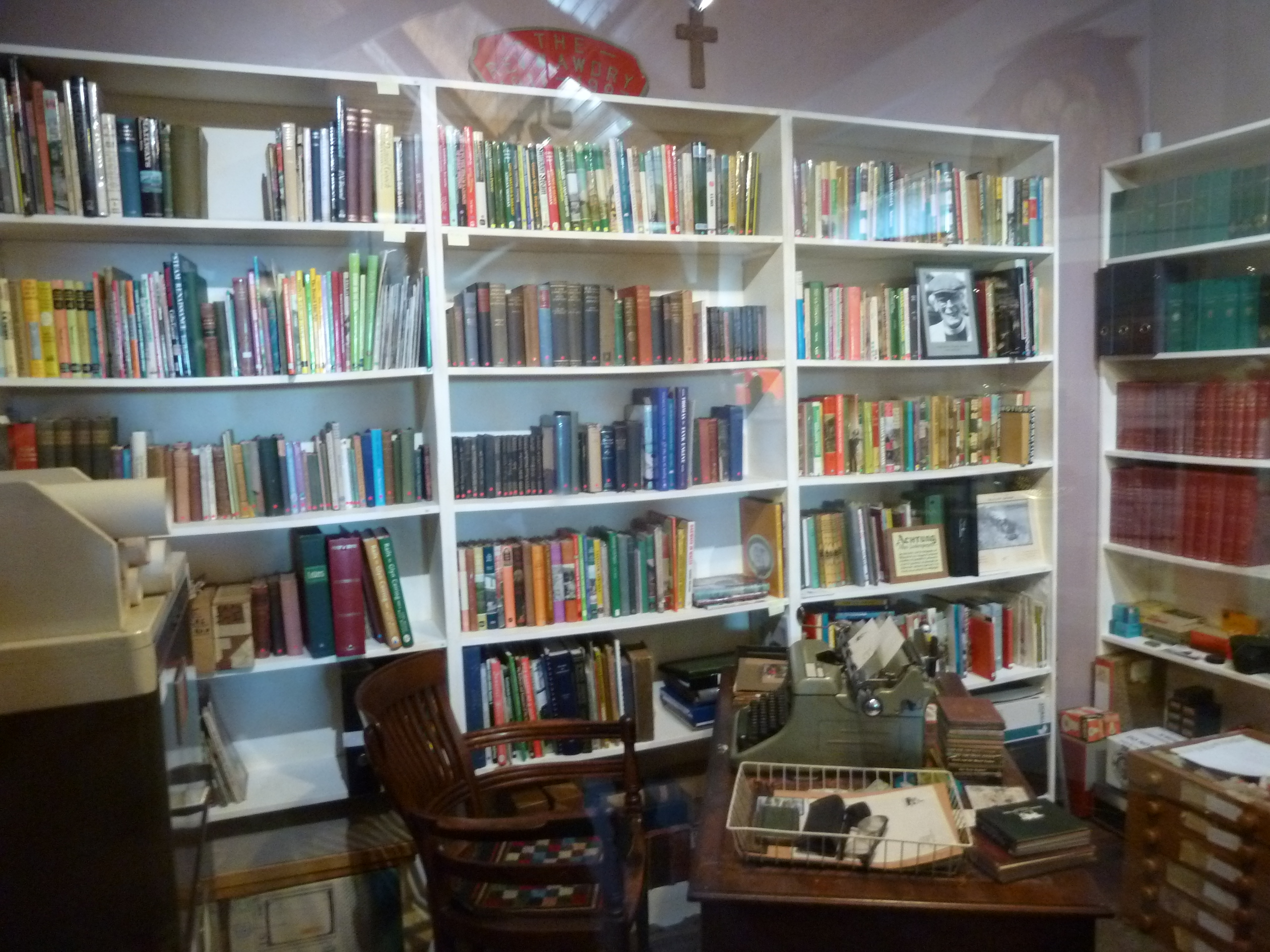
Awdry's study, now preserved in the Narrow Gauge Railway Museum on the Talyllyn Railway

In 1952, Awdry volunteered as a guard on the Talyllyn Railway in Wales, then in its second year of preservation. The railway inspired Awdry to create the Skarloey Railway, based on the Talyllyn, with some of his own exploits being written into the stories.

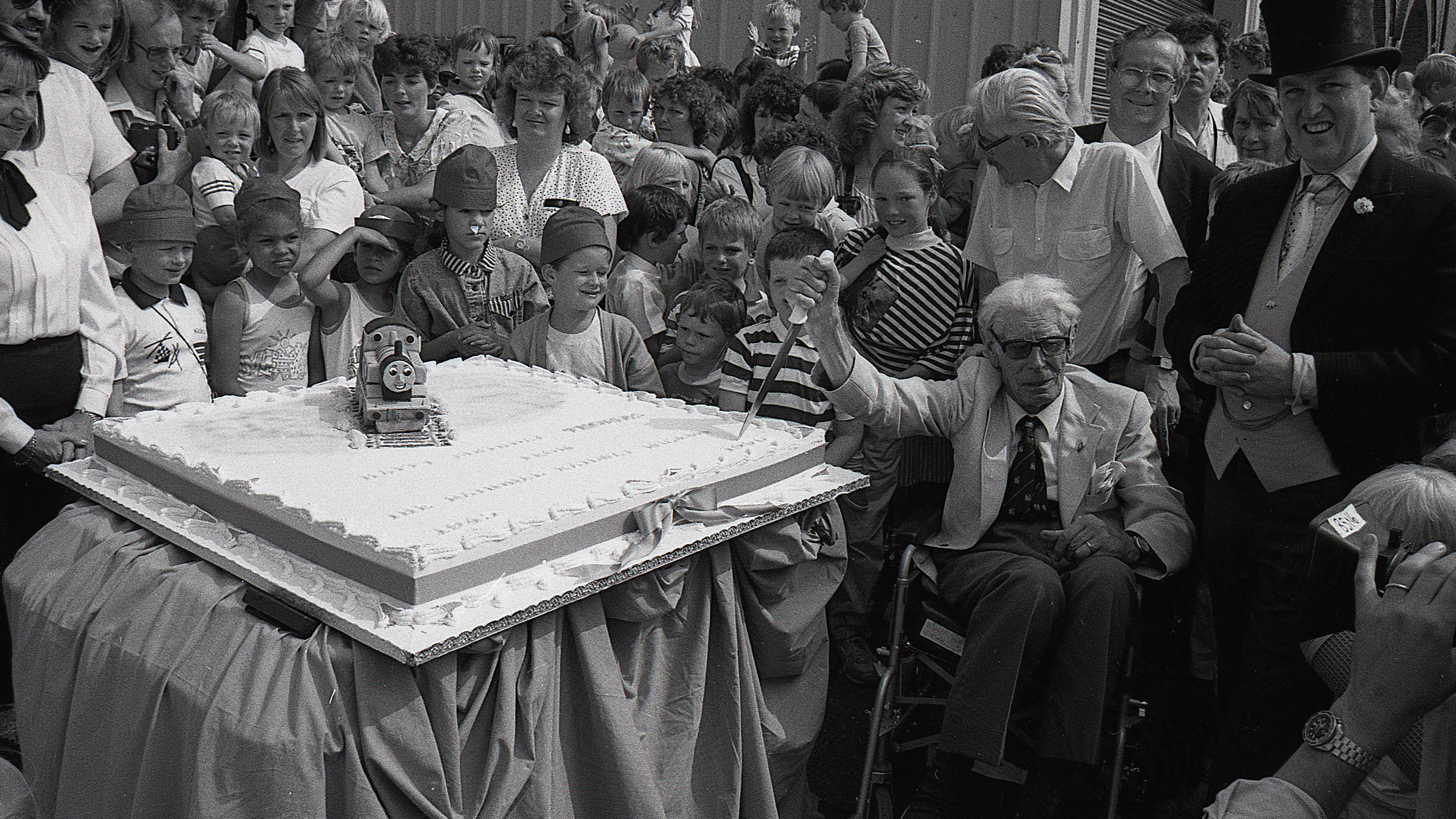
Wilbert Awdry cuts a birthday cake for Thomas the Tank Engine at The National Railway Museum, York, 1980.

Awdry's enthusiasm for railways did not stop at his publications. He was involved in railway preservation, and built model railways which he took to exhibitions around the country. At Emneth, he created an extensive model railway network in his loft, based on Barrow-in-Furness. Emneth was also close to three Wisbech railway stations. Emneth railway station was on the EAR line from Magdalen Road Station (now known as Watlington) to Wisbech East. Emneth station is now a private residence. The GER Wisbech and Upwell Tramway tram engines, coaches and rolling stock were similar to Toby the Tram Engine and Henrietta and the Ely to King's Lynn mainline with Wisbech East railway station on Victoria Road. The Midland and Great Northern Joint Railway (M&GNJR) Peterborough to Sutton Bridge via Wisbech North railway station on Harecroft Road. There were also harbour lines either side of the Port of Wisbech on the River Nene – M&GNJR Harbour West branch and GER Harbour East branch. Awdry was a passenger on Alan Pegler's 1968 non-stop Flying Scotsman London King's Cross to Edinburgh run.

Beginning in the 1950s, Awdry began to shift how he wrote The Railway Series and included the real-world element of the conflict between steam and diesel engines. During the 1950s, the British Railways (BR) began to modernise the railway network, withdrawing their steam engines and replacing them with the modern diesel engine. While that was happening in the real world, in Awdry's fictional universe, he "began more frequently referencing a place known as "The Other Railway", often using it as a foil to his utopian Island of Sodor and treating it akin to a steam engine hell. "The Other Railway" represented B.R. and their callous scrapping of countless steam engines". That shifted The Railway Series from just telling fictional stories in the world Awdry created to paralleling the real world and using events that happened in real life.

Awdry wrote other books besides those of The Railway Series, both fiction and non-fiction. The story Belinda the Beetle was about a red car. It became a Volkswagen Beetle only in the illustrations to the paperback editions.

In 1988, his second Ffarquhar model railway layout was shown to the public for the final time and was featured on an ITN News news item. He was again featured on TV-am for Thomas's 40th anniversary in 1990. During all this, Awdry faced many battles – health problems, depression, and the deaths of his wife, brother, and close friend Teddy Boston. Five years later, he was interviewed by Nicholas Jones for the Bookmark film The Thomas the Tank Engine Man, which first aired on 25 February 1995 and was repeated again on 15 April 1997, shortly after his death.

Awdry was appointed an OBE in the 1996 New Year's Honours List, but by that time his health had deteriorated and he was unable to travel to London. He died peacefully in his sleep in Stroud, Gloucestershire, on 21 March 1997, at the age of 85. His ashes are interred at Gloucester Crematorium.

A biography entitled The Thomas the Tank Engine Man, written by Brian Sibley, was published in 1995.

== Memorials ==
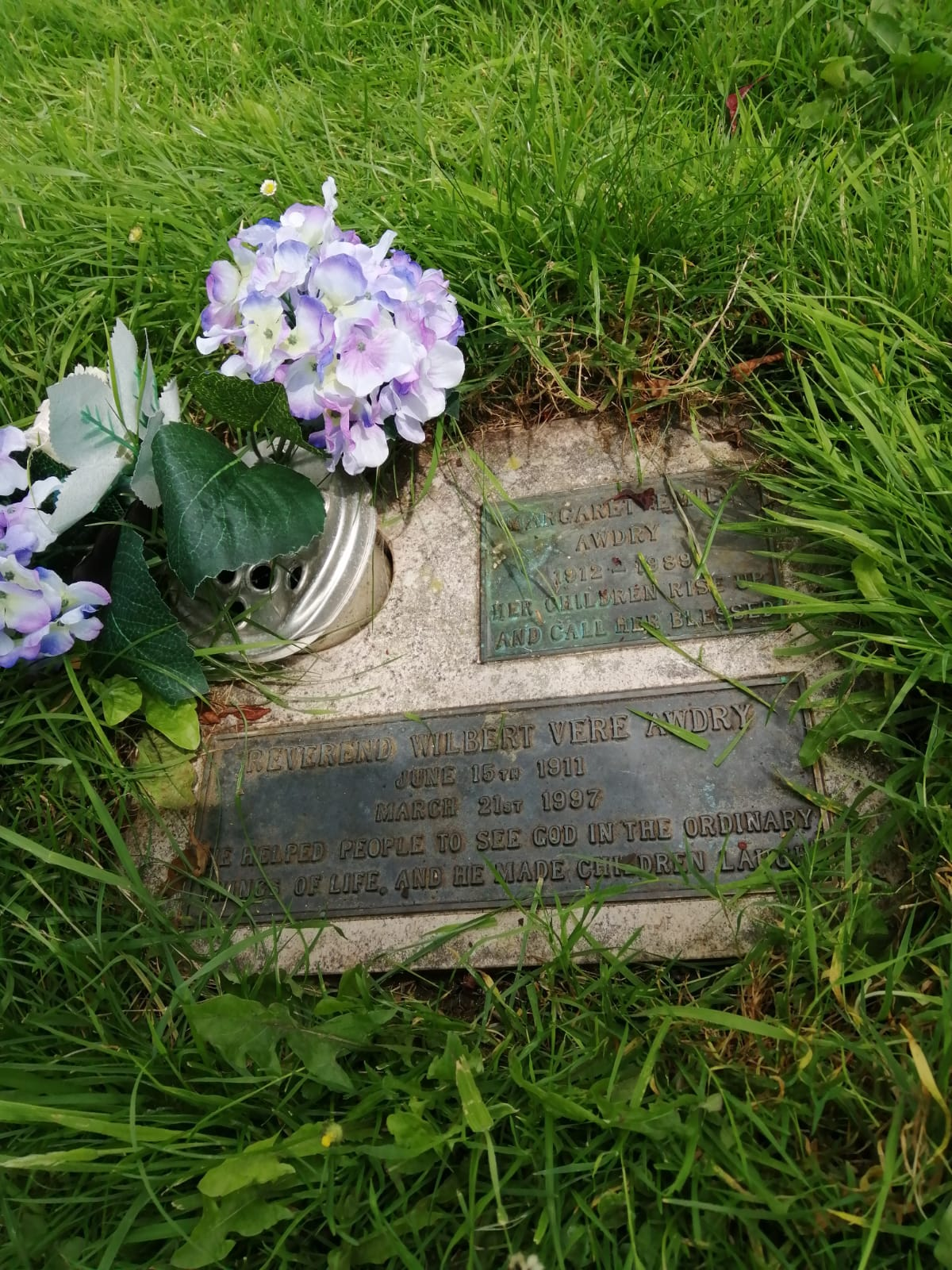
Awdry's memorial plaque, shared with his wife Margaret, at Church Place, Rodborough, Gloucestershire

A Class 91 locomotive, 91 124, used to bear the name The Rev W Awdry. A Hunslet Austerity 0-6-0ST (saddle tank) engine on the Dean Forest Railway is named Wilbert after him; and was used as the title character in Christopher Awdry's Railway Series book Wilbert the Forest Engine.

In 2003, a stained glass window commissioned by the Awdry family was unveiled at St Edmund's Church, Emneth, Norfolk.

In 2011, a blue plaque was unveiled by his daughter Veronica Chambers at The Old Vicarage, Emneth where he lived between 1953 and 1965. In 2012 a blue plaque was unveiled at "Lorne House", Box, where he lived between 1920 and 1928 when its name was "Journey's End".

In 2013, Cambridgeshire County Council named their new offices in Wisbech Awdry House in his memory.

In 2015, a CGI representation of Awdry made a cameo appearance in the Thomas & Friends feature-length special Sodor's Legend of the Lost Treasure. The character, referred to by his Railway Series alias, 'The Thin Clergyman', made several further appearances including in The Great Race (2016).

A pedestrian rail crossing bridge has been dedicated to Awdry in 2017 in the small Hampshire town of Chandlers Ford, which is very close (and has the closest railway line and station) to his birthplace of Ampfield.

In 2021, to mark the 75th anniversary of Thomas the Tank Engine, a blue plaque was unveiled at the old Rectory of Holy Trinity Church in Elsworth, Cambridgeshire. Cambridge Past, Present & Future put up the plaque to mark the books he wrote there, which his family was present at. His daughter, Veronica Chambers, said she was "delighted and moved".

In October 2025, Historic England unveiled a blue plaque in Awdry's honour at his former home at 30 Rodborough Avenue, Stroud, Gloucestershire.

== Letter to Christopher ==
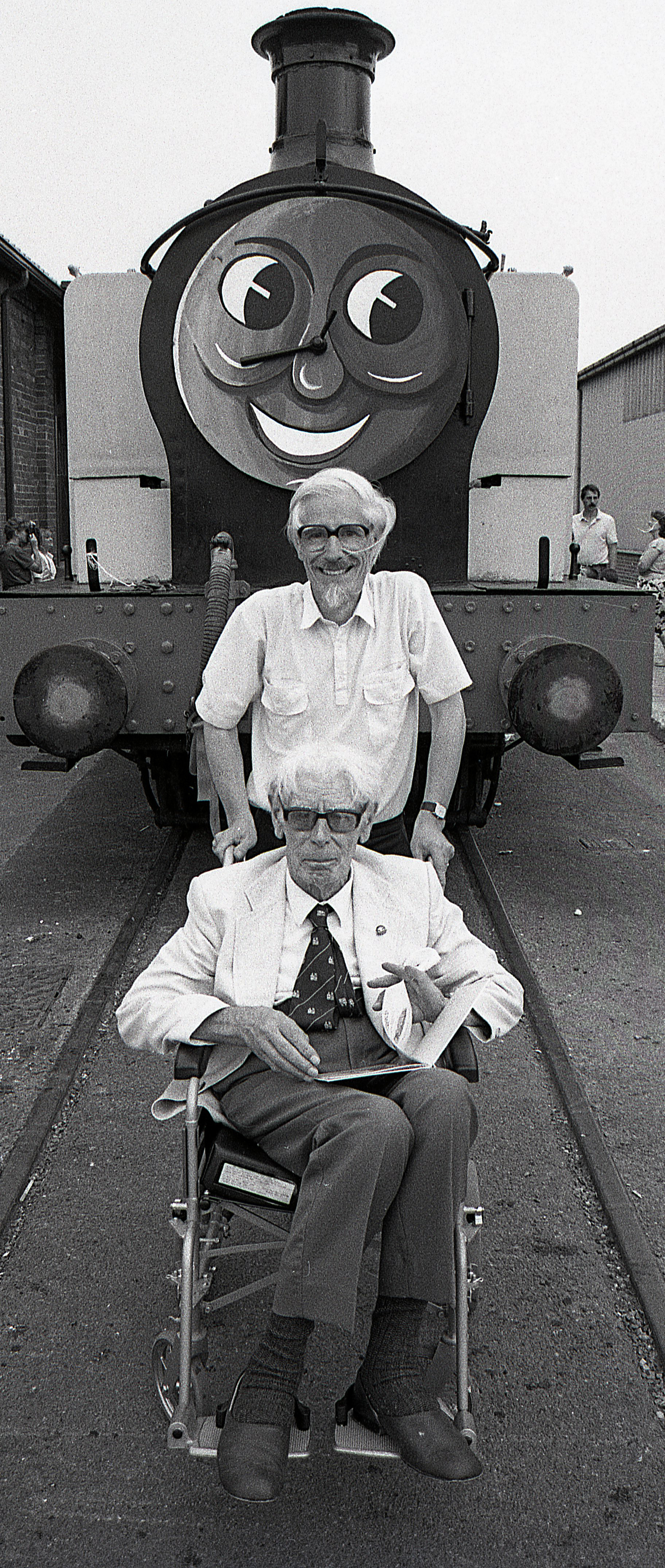
Wilbert and son Christopher Awdry, National Railway Museum, York 1980

In the second book in the series, Thomas the Tank Engine, Awdry wrote this "letter" to his son Christopher:

Dear Christopher,
Here is your friend Thomas, the Tank Engine.
He wanted to come out of his station-yard and see the world.
These stories tell you how he did it.

I hope you will like them because you helped me to make them.
Your Loving Daddy

Subsequent books featured a similar letter from the author, addressed to the readers of the book as "Dear Friends", which introduced the background to the stories within the book.

This text also appears at the beginning of Thomas & Friends episodes from 2004 to 2012. The letter appears with a storybook showing Thomas on the front cover with "Thomas the Tank Engine" at the top and "By the Rev. W. Awdry" at the bottom. The letter is read in voice-over by British actor Nigel Plaskitt.

== Publications ==
Fiction

- The Railway Series books
  1. The Three Railway Engines (1945)
  2. Thomas the Tank Engine (1946)
  3. James the Red Engine (1948)
  4. Tank Engine Thomas Again (1949)
  5. Troublesome Engines (1950)
  6. Henry the Green Engine (1951)
  7. Toby the Tram Engine (1952)
  8. Gordon the Big Engine (1953)
  9. Edward the Blue Engine (1954)
  10. Four Little Engines (1955)
  11. Percy the Small Engine (1956)
  12. The Eight Famous Engines (1957)
  13. Duck and the Diesel Engine (1958)
  14. The Little Old Engine (1959)
  15. The Twin Engines (1960)
  16. Branch Line Engines (1961)
  17. Gallant Old Engine (1962)
  18. Stepney the "Bluebell" Engine (1963)
  19. Mountain Engines (1964)
  20. Very Old Engines (1965)
  21. Main Line Engines (1966)
  22. Small Railway Engines (1967)
  23. Enterprising Engines (1968)
  24. Oliver the Western Engine (1969)
  25. Duke the Lost Engine (1970)
  26. Tramway Engines (1972)
  - Thomas's Christmas Party (1984)
  - Thomas Comes to Breakfast (1985)
- Belinda the Beetle (1958) illustrated by Ionicus
- Belinda Beats the Band (1962) illustrated by John T. Kenney
- W V Awdry & G E V Awdry, The Island of Sodor: Its People, History and Railways, Kaye and Ward, 1986.

Non-fiction

- Our Child Begins to Pray (Edmund Ward, 1951)
- P J Long & W V Awdry, The Birmingham and Gloucester Railway, Alan Sutton Publishing, 1987.
- Chris Cook and W V Awdry, Guide to the Steam Railways of Great Britain, Pelham Books, 1979.
- W V Awdry & G E V Awdry, The Canadian Wonderland Tour 1980, Full-Steam-Ahead publishing, 2026
