= Bicslade Tramroad =

Wagonway in Gloucestershire, England

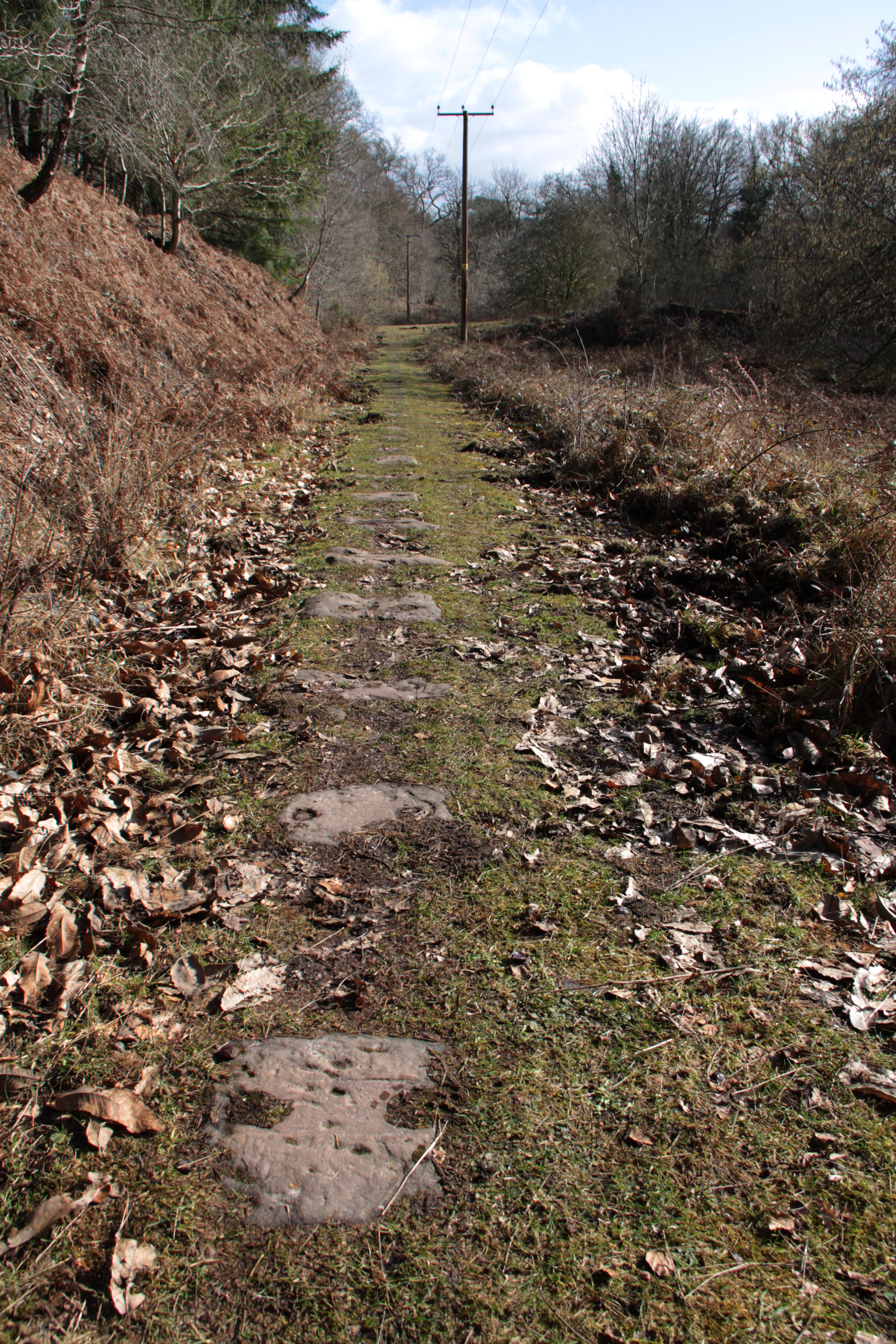
Stone sleeper blocks on the Bicslade Tramroad, now a footpath

The Bicslade Tramroad was a wagonway built by the Severn and Wye Railway (S&WR) in the Forest of Dean, Gloucestershire, England. The first section of the line was opened in 1812 as a branch of the S&WR plateway from Lydney to Lydbrook, which had opened in 1810. It was expanded over time to serve the collieries and quarries in the Bixslade valley (although the S&WR referred to the line as the Bicslade Tramroad); the last stretch, to Bixhead Quarry, opened in 1855. Stone traffic ceased in 1944 and coal followed in 1946.

== History ==
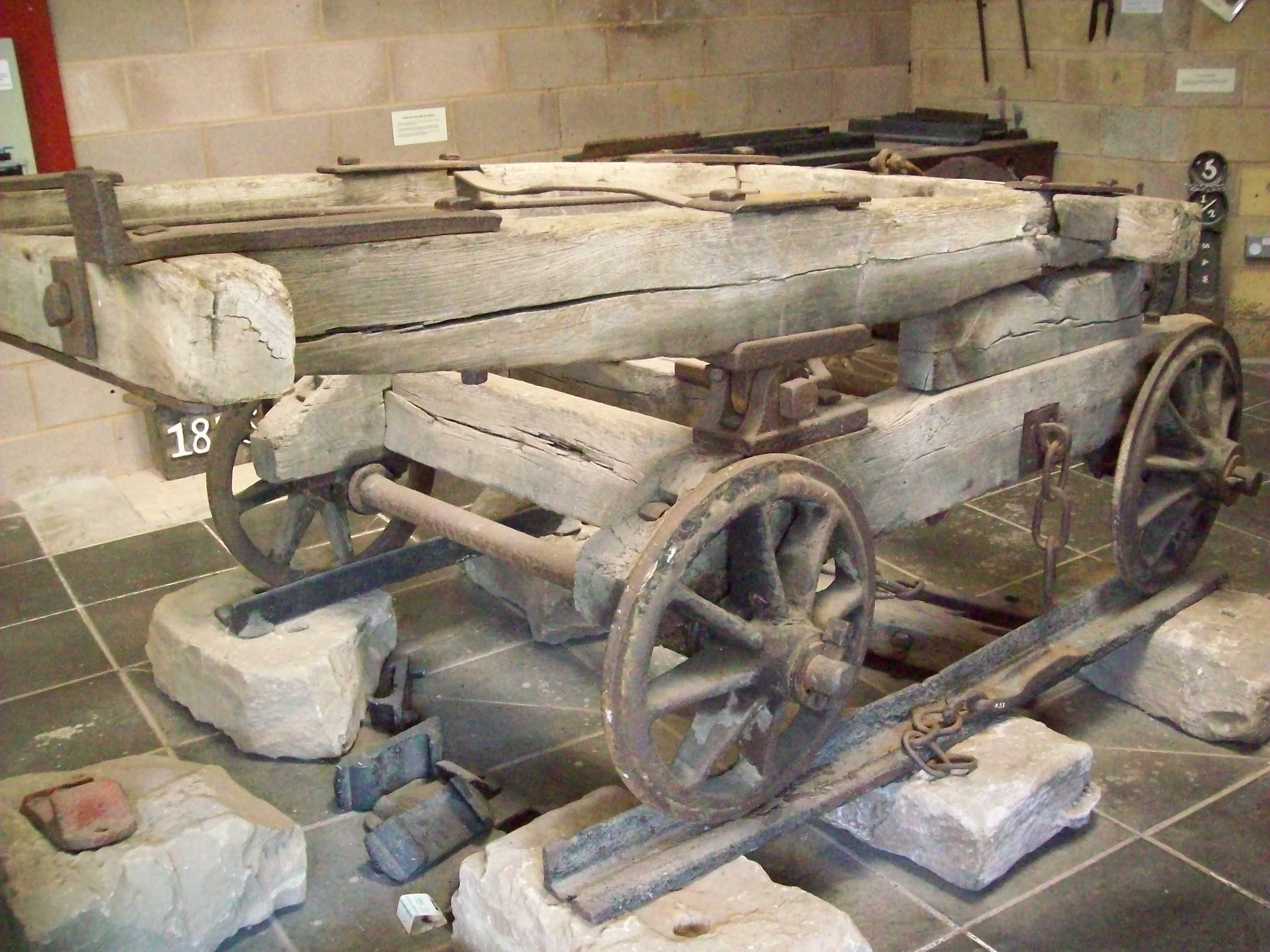
A preserved Bicslade tram at the Dean Heritage Centre

Opened in 1812, the 3 ft 6 in (1,067 mm) line ran between Bixhead Quarry and Bicslade Wharf. It served the Forest of Dean Stone Firm, Union Pit (also known as the Bixshead Slade Pit), Mine Train Quarry, Bixslade Low Level (Bixslade Deep Level), Hopewell Mapleford Colliery, Bixslade High Level (Bixslade Land Level), Spion Kop Quarry, Bixhead Quarry and Phoenix Colliery, in addition to several other minor quarries. Extensions and sidings were constructed continually between 1812 and 1855 to serve the different industries of the area. In 1855 the tramroad reached its largest extent, with two passing loops.

From 1874, when the Severn and Wye Railway was converted into locomotive power, cargo carried by the line was transferred at Bicslade Wharf onto trains to be shipped to their destinations. In 1899 stone from Mine Train Quarry was being sent via the branch to the Marquis of Bute for work on the renovation of Cardiff Castle.

The line gradually declined during the beginning of the 20th century; on 25 July 1944 the last stones were transported via the line and coal traffic stopped in 1946. The tramway continued to be operated by horse-power until traffic finally ceased in the 1950s, by which time it was the last working horse-powered tramroad operating in the Forest of Dean.

== Today ==
Almost the entirety of the Tramroad's route has been converted into public footpaths. Nearby, Cannop Ponds (a reservoir which used the tramroad as a dam) is now a popular visitor attraction and picnic site, owned by the Forestry Commission. A guide along the path of the tramroad has been published by the local history society and is available in many nearby shops.

One freemine, Monument Mine, and three quarries continue to operate in the Bixslade valley, largely hidden by woodland.

Two of the trams on the line have been preserved and are now on public display at the Dean Heritage Centre and at the Narrow Gauge Railway Museum in Tywyn.

== See also ==
- Bixslade
- Cannop Ponds
