= List of mountain bike areas and trails in the United Kingdom =

== England ==
- Aston Hill Mountain Bike Area
- Bedgebury Forest
- Cannock Chase
- Dalby Forest
- Esher Shore
- Eastridge Woods Trail Center
- Exmoor
- Cannop Cycle Centre, Forest of Dean
- Guisborough
- Hamsterley
- Lee Quarry, Bacup
- Penshurst Off Road Cycling (AKA PORC), Kent
- Quantock Hills
- Queen Elizabeth Country Park, Petersfield, Hampshire
- Rowney Warren Mountain Biking
- Stainburn
- Swinley Forest
- Wharncliffe Woods, north of Sheffield, Yorkshire

== Scotland ==
- 7stanes
- Nevis Range, near Fort William

== Wales ==
- Afan Argoed
- Coed-y-Brenin
- Cwm Carn
- Brecon Beacons National Park
- Llandegla Forest
- Llangynog
- The Marin Trail, in Gwydir Forest

== See also ==
- Mountain biking in the United Kingdom
