= List of railway museums in the United Kingdom =

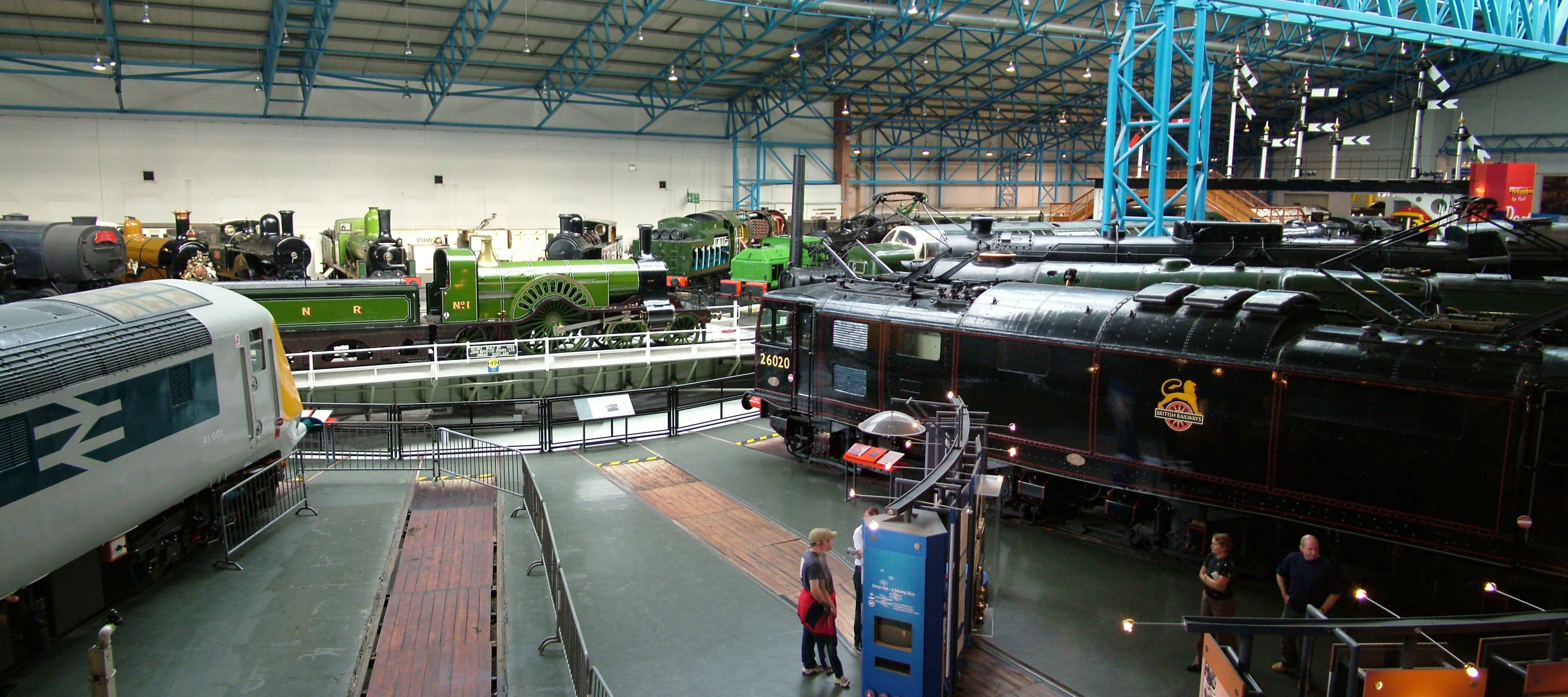
The National Railway Museum, York is the largest railway museum in the United Kingdom

This is a list of railway museums in the United Kingdom Channel Islands and Isle of Man

== England ==
=== East of England ===
- Bressingham Steam Museum, Norfolk
- East Anglian Railway Museum
- Mangapps Railway Museum

=== Greater London ===
- Kew Bridge Steam Museum
- London Transport Museum Acton Depot- limited opening days
- London Transport Museum Covent Garden
- Southall Railway Centre
- Walthamstow Pump House Museum

=== Midlands ===
- Barrow Hill Roundhouse
- Bishop's Castle Railway Museum
- Cambrian Heritage Railways, Oswestry, Shropshire
- Chasewater Railway Museum, Staffordshire
- The Engine House, Highley, Shropshire
- Great Central Railway (Nottingham)
- Heritage Shunters Trust
- Kidderminster Railway Museum, Kidderminster Town Station, Worcestershire
- Moseley Railway Trust
- National Tramway Museum, Crich, Derbyshire
- North Ings Farm Museum
- Northamptonshire Ironstone Railway Trust
- Rushden Station Railway Museum
- Rutland Railway Museum, Rutland
- Statfold Barn Railway, Tamworth
- Tyseley Locomotive Works

=== North East England ===
- Beamish museum
- Hopetown Darlington
- Locomotion Museum, Shildon, (free entry)
- Monkwearmouth Station Museum, Sunderland
- North Tyneside Steam Railway, North Shields

=== North West England ===
- Astley Green Colliery Museum, Astley, Greater Manchester
- Carnforth railway station Heritage Centre, Lancashire
- Crewe Heritage Centre, Crewe
- Hadlow Road railway station, Willaston, Cheshire
- Ravenglass and Eskdale Railway Museum, Ravenglass, Cumbria
- Science and Industry Museum, Manchester

=== South East England ===
- Amberley Museum and Heritage Centre, near Arundel, West Sussex
- Bluebell Railway Museum, Sheffield Park Station, East Sussex
- Buckinghamshire Railway Centre, Buckinghamshire
- Colonel Stephens Railways Museum, Tenterden
- Didcot Railway Centre
- Elham Valley Line Trust, Peene, near Folkestone
- Hollycombe Steam Collection
- Isle of Wight Steam Railway and museum
- One:One collection, Hornby Railways, Margate, Kent (selected opening dates)
- Pendon Museum near Didcot, Oxfordshire

=== South West England ===
- Bere Ferrers railway station
- Bideford Railway Heritage Centre, Devon
- Bristol Harbour Railway and Industrial Museum
- Coleford Great Western Railway Museum, Coleford, Gloucestershire
- Devon Railway Centre, Bickleigh, Mid Devon
- Museum of the Great Western Railway, Swindon
- Shillingstone Railway Project, Dorset
- Somerset & Dorset Railway Heritage Trust, Midsomer Norton
- Swanage Railway, Dorset
- Tiverton Museum of Mid Devon Life, Devon
- Westonzoyland Pumping Station Museum, Bridgwater
- Yeovil Railway Centre, Yeovil Junction railway station, Somerset

=== Yorkshire ===
- Derwent Valley Light Railway, Murton Park, York
- Middleton Railway, Leeds, West Yorkshire
- Museum of Rail Travel, Ingrow, Keighley
- National Railway Museum, York, (free entry)

== Scotland ==
- Museum of Scottish Railways, Bo'ness
- Riverside Museum, Glasgow
- Summerlee Museum of Scottish Industrial Life

== Wales ==
- Conwy Valley Railway Museum, Betws-y-Coed
- Narrow Gauge Railway Museum – Tywyn, Gwynedd
- Penrhyn Castle Railway Museum
- Vale of Rheidol Railway Museum, Aberystwyth

== Northern Ireland ==
- Ulster Folk and Transport Museum
- Whitehead Railway Museum

== Isle of Man ==
- Jurby Transport Museum
- The Manx Electric Railway Museum, Douglas, Isle of Man
- Port Erin railway museum

== Channel Islands ==
- Pallot Heritage Steam Museum

== See also ==
- List of British heritage and private railways
- Heritage railways in Northern Ireland
- List of heritage railways
- Mountain railway
- List of Conservation topics
- Conservation in the United Kingdom
- List of railway companies
- British Rail
