= Granham's Moor Quarry =

Protected area in Shropshire, England

Coordinates: 52°37′39″N 2°54′12″W

Granham's Moor Quarry is a Site of Special Scientific Interest (SSSI) in Shropshire, England. It is located 1 km southeast of Minsterley within Eastridge Woods. This site of considerable geological importance because the exposed rocks in this protected area show the junction between Cambrian and Ordovician strata.

During the period when this Granham's Moor Quarry was active, it was for a time (beginning in 1905) connected to the Snailbeech District Railways.

== Geology ==
In Granham's Moor Quarry, basal Ordovician Stiperstones Quartzite rests upon Cambrian shales of the Tremadoc Series.

== Land ownership ==
All land within Granham's Moor Quarry SSSI is owned by the Forestry Commission as this protected area is located within Eastridge Woods.
