= Mountain biking in the United Kingdom =

Off-road cycling as a sport in the UK

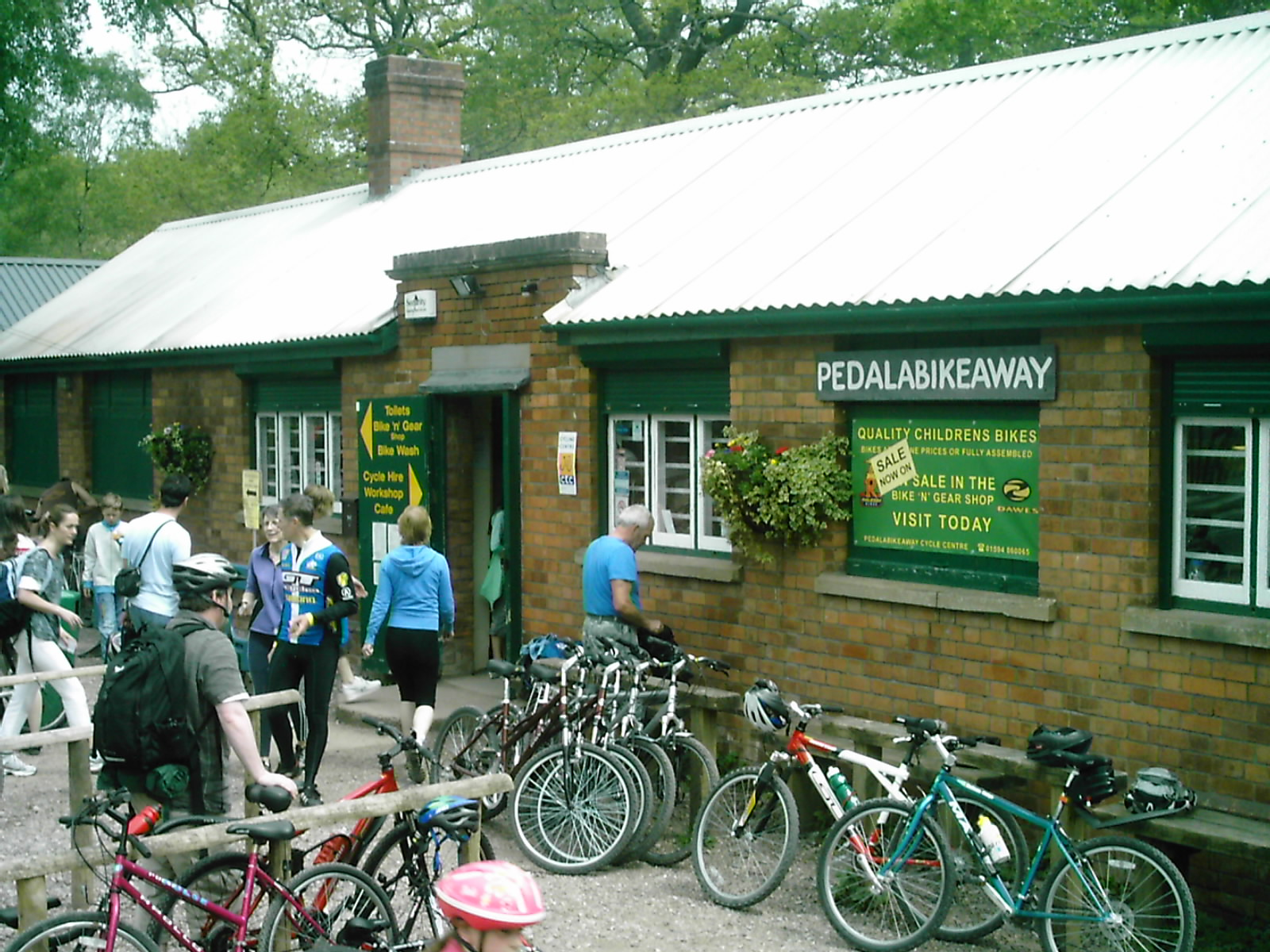
Cannop Cycle Centre in the Forest of Dean

Mountain biking in the UK comprises a mix of dedicated mountain bike trail centres and other areas that have become popular with mountain bikers despite lacking dedicated facilities. The main governing body for mountain bike racing in the UK is British Cycling (formerly the British Cycling Federation).

== Trail Centres in England ==
Cumbria and Lancashire

- Grizedale Trail Centre
- Whinlatter Trail Centre

East Midlands

- Eastridge Woods Trail Centre
- Sherwood Pines Trail Centre

East of England

- Thetford Forest Trail Centre

The North East

- Hansterley Forest Trail Centre
- Kielder Trail Centre

The North West

- Clayton Vale Mountain Bike Trails
- Gisburn Forest Trail Centre

The South East and London

- Aston Hill Mountain Bike Park
- Hadleigh Park Mountain Bike Trail Centre
- Surrey Hills

The South West

- Cannop Cycle Centre (Forest of Dean)
- Haldon Forest Trail Centre
- Lanhydrock Cycle Hub

West Midlands

- Cannock Chase Trail Centre
- Hopton Woods Trail Centre

Yorkshire and the Humber

- Dalby Forest Mountain Bike Trail Centre
- Stainburn Forest Trail Centre

== Trail Centres in Scotland ==
North Scotland

- Glenlivet Trail Centre
- Laggan Wolftrax Trail Centre
- Moray Monster Trail Centre
- Tarland Mountain Bike Trails

South Scotland, collectively known as the 7Stanes sites

- Ae Forest Mountain Bike Trail Centre
- Dalbeattie Trail Centre
- Glentress Trail Centre
- Glentrool Trail Centre
- Innerleithen Mountain Bike Trail Centre
- Kirroughtree Trail Centre
- Newcastleton Mountain Bike Trail Centre

== Trail Centres in Wales ==
North Wales

- Antur 'Stiniog Trail Centre
- Coed y Brenin Trail Centre
- Llandegla Trail Centre

Mid Wales

- Bwlch Nant yr Arian Trail Centre
- Coed Trallwm Trail Centre

South Wales

- Afan Forest Park Trail Centre
- Brechfa Trail Centre
- Cwmcarn Trail Centre

== Trail Centres in Northern Ireland ==
- Castle Ward Mountain Bike Trails

== British mountain bike manufacturers ==
- Boardman Bikes
- Dawes Cycles
- Orange Mountain Bikes
- Raleigh Bicycle Company
- Whyte (Bicycles)
- Hope Technology
- Airdrop Bikes
- Cotic
- Starling Cycles
- On-One Mountain Bikes
- Saracen Bikes
- Vitus Bikes
- Ragley Bikes
- BTR Fabrications
- Carbon Wasp
- Empire Cycles
- Robot Bike Co.
- Bird Cycleworks
- Dartmoor Bikes

== See also ==
- List of mountain bike areas and trails in the United Kingdom
