= Geology of Gloucestershire =

Geology of English county

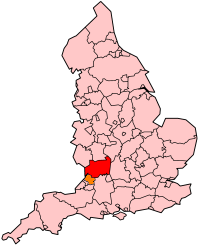
Gloucestershire

Gloucestershire is one of the most geologically and scenically diverse counties in England, with rocks from the Precambrian through to the Jurassic represented. These varying rock-types are responsible for the three major areas of the county, each with its own distinctive scenery and land-use - the Forest of Dean in the west, bordering Wales, the Cotswolds in the east, and in between, the Severn Vale.

== Forest of Dean ==
The Forest of Dean, situated between the rivers Severn and Wye, is formed of a raised basin of Palaeozoic rocks folded in the Variscan Orogeny, similar to the South Wales Coalfield to the west. Underlain by great thicknesses of the Old Red Sandstone, the basin is filled with Carboniferous limestones, sandstones and coal measures - all of which have contributed to the industrial history of the region. Sometimes called ‘the prettiest coalfield in Britain’, the Forest's main coal output was in the 18th, 19th and early 20th centuries, although for hundreds of years coal has been won in the area via ‘free-mines’, which could only be operated by local people known as freeminers. One or two survive today. Small-scale mining has been enabled by the exposed nature of the coalfield, with seams often outcropping at surface. Iron-ore has been extracted from labyrinthine mines or 'Scowles' in the limestone since at least Roman times. Several large quarries are still at work in the area, providing Carboniferous Limestone for road surfacing and also Pennant sandstone (see picture) - a popular building stone used notably by Thomas Telford for the Over road bridge, spanning the River Severn near Gloucester.

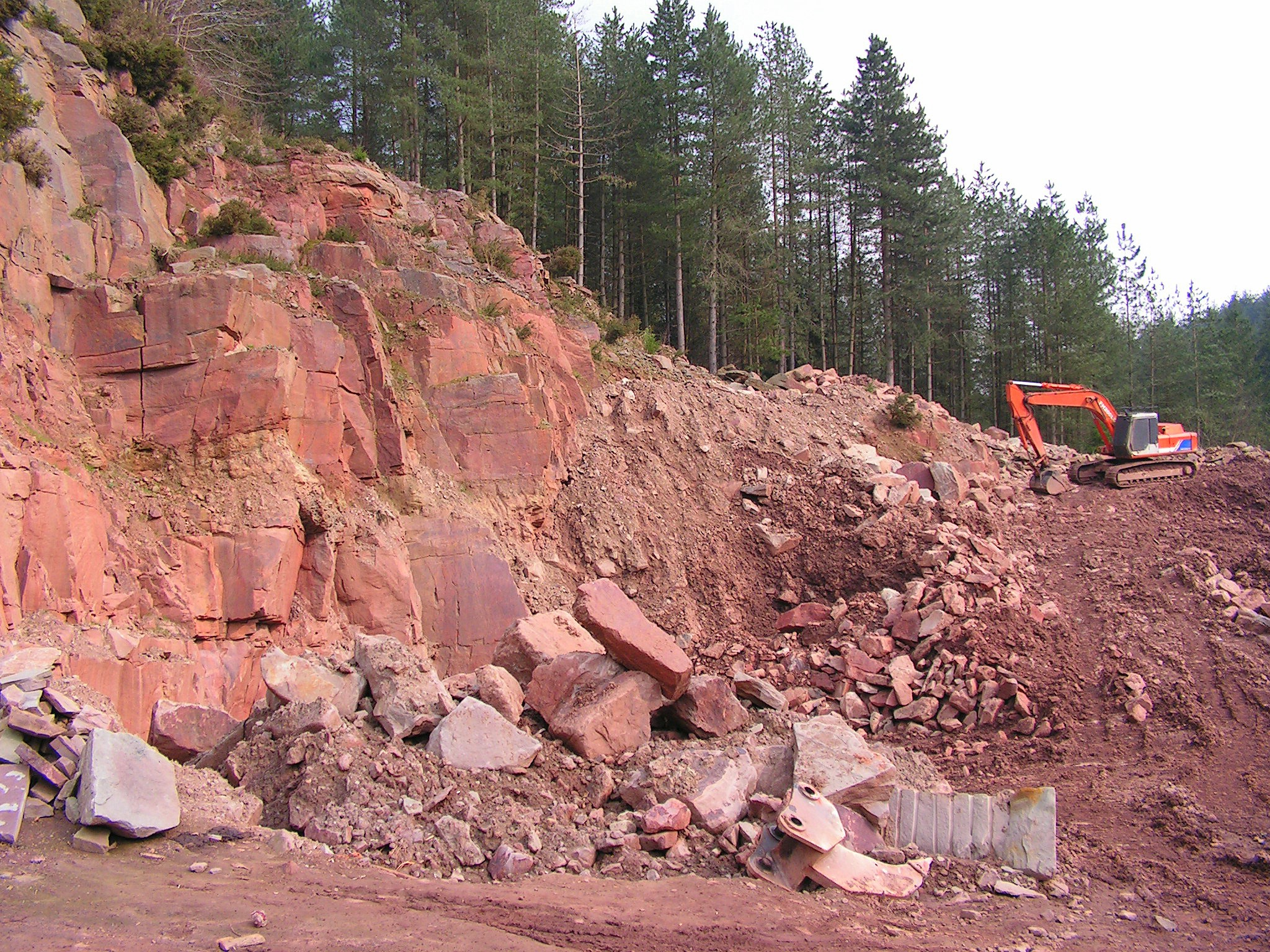
Pennant Sandstone being quarried at Bixslade, in the Forest of Dean

The scenic Wye Valley defines the western edge of Dean as well as the England/Wales border. Impressive cliffs have been cut by the river in lower dolomitic sections of the Carboniferous Limestone, most notably at the popular ‘Symonds Yat’ viewpoint, which affords one of the most famous views in England. Other ‘karst’ features such as caves, rock pillars and sink holes abound in this area.

On the north-east edge of Dean the Silurian period is represented by the distinctive inlier of May Hill, which rises to some 970 feet, crowned with a pine plantation. This isolated hill lies on the north-south Malvern Line and affords superb views from its summit of the Severn Vale, with the Cotswolds forming the horizon beyond. A high degree of faulting complicates the geology of the May Hill area, causing outcrops of Wenlock limestone and Downton Castle Sandstone on its flanks, as well as a possibly Precambrian section of the core of the hill exposed at Huntley quarry. The hilltop is of Llandovery age May Hill Sandstone.

== Severn Vale ==
To the east is the wide fertile Severn Vale, floored by Triassic 'New Red' sandstones and marls of the Mercia Mudstone Group (formerly known as the 'Keuper Marls'), and Jurassic lias clays further east. The Triassic deposits were formed in a Sahara -like desert when the British Isles lay about 15 degrees north of the equator, whereas the clays represent deep-water sediments. The landscape here is flattish, with the only feature of note a rather weak low scarp which meanders across the vale from SW to NE marking the Triassic/Jurassic border. This is superbly illustrated at the ‘Garden Cliff’, Westbury-on-Severn (see picture), where the river Severn has sliced a convenient ‘cut-away’ section of this transition from the red Triassic marls, through the thin Penarth Group (formerly 'Rhaetic') strata, to the lias clays and limestones of the lower Jurassic.

The 'Garden Cliff' at Westbury-on-Severn. Triassic marls of the Mercia Mudstone group. The green/grey streaks, known as 'Tea Green marls' are caused by ferrous oxide formed in reducing conditions

Traditional building stone in the Severn Vale is scarce, necessitating brick or half-timbered construction in the main, although along the scarp mentioned above harder limestone bands in the Lower Lias (known as 'Blue Lias') have been used in vernacular building.

Towards the east side of the Severn Vale the Lias clays are overlain by the sands and limestones of the Middle Lias - well displayed on the slopes of Robinswood Hill, a Jurassic outlier overlooking the city of Gloucester. Further east, forming a rather unstable base to the Cotswold escarpment, are the sands and clays of the Upper Lias.

Superficial deposits are widespread. Floodplain alluvium accompanies the course of the Severn itself as well as tributaries such as the Leadon, Chelt, Frome and Cam. Ancient terraces of former, more elevated floodplains mark the position of the major rivers through various glacial and inter-glacial periods in the last ice age. A sheet of mainly Jurassic limestone fan gravel probably covered most of the vale in the past but has since been eroded away leaving isolated deposits, most notably the Cheltenham Sand, which forms a well-draining light soil in the Cheltenham-Gloucester region.

Inferior oolite exposed below Crickley Hillfort on the edge of the Cotswold escarpment. The Precambrian Malvern hills snake along the background. The Severn Vale is cloaked in fog in this picture

== The Cotswolds ==
The Middle-Jurassic oolitic limestone series which forms the bulk of the Cotswolds hills contains the best-known of the county's rocks on account of its extensive use throughout the area as a building stone. All from churches to humble cottages have been imbued with a mellow, warm character from the golden yellow colour of the stone - to which many ‘honey-pot’ Cotswold towns owe their modern popularity and prosperity. The series is divided into the Inferior and Great Oolite Groups. The Inferior Oolite, capping the main north-west facing escarpment, comprises up to 100m of mainly oolitic limestones including the Cheltenham freestone - quarried most extensively at Leckhampton and used widely in the distinctive Regency architecture of Cheltenham. The Great Oolite, forming much of the rather barren Cotswold plateau, encompasses a variety of oolitic, shelly, sandy or marly limestone beds, many of which are used for building purposes such as dry-stone walling and roof tiles.

The limestones were predominantly laid down in a shallow warm continental sea, similar to that off the present-day Bahamas, and are rich in fossils of hard-shelled sea creatures such as brachiopods and sea urchins. Clay bands (e.g. the Fuller's Earth Clay at the base of the Great Oolite Series) represent deeper water periods. As the Cotswold dip-slope is followed toward the south-eastern county extremities these clays and mudstones begin to predominate as the Upper Jurassic period Oxford Clay.

Most of the Cotswold rivers flow south-eastwards down the dip-slope, supplying the river Thames, whose headwaters lie at the bottom of the slope on the Upper Jurassic clays. Terrace deposits up to 6m thick of mainly local oolitic limestone gravels have been left by the river Thames in its upper course during glacial and peri-glacial periods. Downcutting and a gradual southerly migration of the river has left a succession of four terraces at varying heights, chiefly north of its present course.

== Other areas ==
- Gloucestershire's oldest rocks occur at Chase End hill in the extreme north-west of the county, where Precambrian hornblende-gneiss of the Malvern Group forms the southern end of the Malvern Hills before plunging under the Triassic cover.
- Poorly exposed Cambrian shales of Tremadoc age form an inlier extending from the Tortworth area (between Gloucester and Bristol) northwards to Tites Point on the River Severn. The Silurian is also represented in the Tortworth area, with rocks outcropping along a continuation of the Malvern fault belt south of the Severn.
- Carboniferous rocks give rise to the Bristol Coalfield in south-west Gloucestershire.

== See also ==
- Geology of the UK
- Gloucestershire
- Forest of Dean
- Forest of Dean Coalfield
- Cotswolds
