= Cannop Ponds =

Ponds in Gloucestershire, England

Coordinates: 51°47′33″N 2°34′11″W

Cannop Ponds, within Gloucestershire.

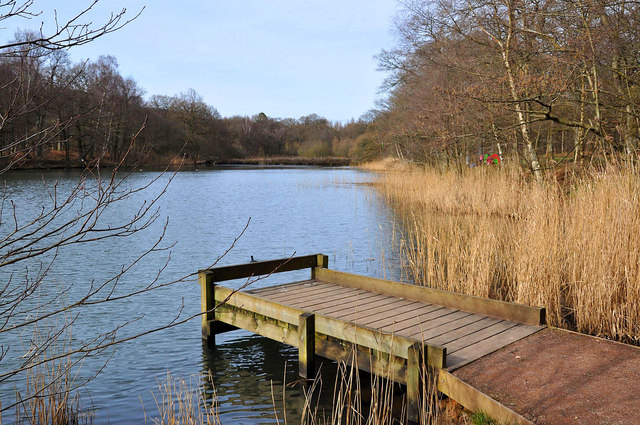
Cannop Ponds

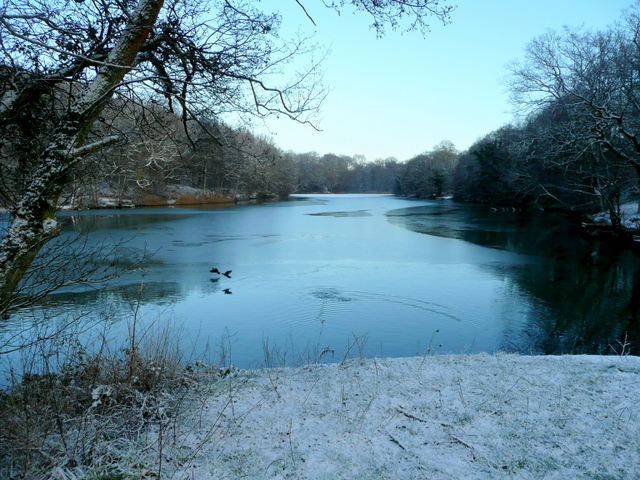
Lower Cannop Pond in the midwinter

Cannop Ponds (grid reference SO608106) are two large ponds, just north of Parkend in the Forest of Dean, Gloucestershire, England. The ponds, and surrounding area, are a popular tourist destination.

An area of reeds above the top pond, known as 'Cannop Bridge Marsh', is a nature reserve managed (under agreement since 1983) by the Gloucestershire Wildlife Trust.

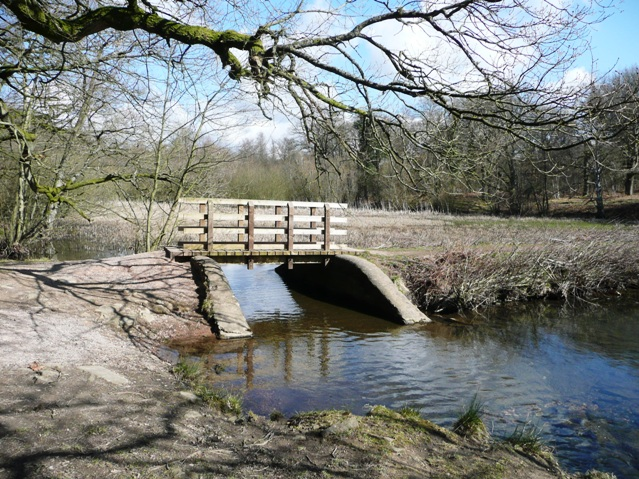
Bridge at Cannop Ponds

The site (Cannop Bridge Marsh and Cannop Ponds & Woods) are listed in the 'Forest of Dean Local Plan Review' as a Key Wildlife Site (KWS).

== History ==
The lower pond was created in 1825 to supply water, via a leat, to a waterwheel at Parkend Ironworks. The flow of water proved unreliable and an upper pond was added in 1829 to boost the supply.

== Facilities ==
Facilities at the ponds include a large car park, information boards, picnic tables and a waymarked walk. The ponds also feature on the Forest of Dean Family Cycle Trail. The ponds are used for fishing by the Yorkley Angling Club, from 1 May to 31 March each year.

== Wildlife ==
The ponds are a well-known site for Mandarin ducks, reed warblers and a pair of nesting mute swans.

== Cannop Bridge Marsh ==
=== The site ===
Fuller information is provided in the Gloucestershire Wildlife Trust nature reserves handbook and its main features are mixed woodland and marshland. The area is a 9-hectare (22-acre) site. The marsh (grid reference SO609110) is surrounded by relics of the area's industrial heritage as it lies in the heart of the Forest of Dean coal measures. The reserve is open to the public and is part of the Forest Nature Reserve. The Cannop Brook flows through the centre of the reserve, and opens at the southern end into Cannop north pond. There is a disused mineral railway line, now a Forestry England road on the eastern boundary, and there are disused railway sidings at the northern end. The sidings are now wooded with alder and birch. There is a bridge and causeway on the southern boundary separating the marsh within the reserve, from the northernmost Cannop pond.

=== Plants and trees ===
The main feature of the marsh is club-rush which forms dense stands together with bulrush, great willowherb and common reed. The alder and birch wood on the drier areas has a good ground flora which is dominated by grasses, Remote-sedge and horsetails. The species reported include common spotted-orchid, marsh pennywort, common valerian, skullcap and creeping jenny. Wood horsetail is abundant in a damp area.

There is grazing to maintain the short-grassland areas in the north and east of the site and sheep's fescue is prominent.

=== Birds ===
Small birds are reported in wooded areas such at nuthatch, chiffchaff, wood warbler, treecreeper, marsh tit, pied flycatcher, common redstart and great spotted woodpecker. Resident waterfowl include moorhen, mallard and coot and breeding reed buntings have been reported.

=== Invertebrates ===
The invertebrate fauna includes common blue and silver-washed fritillary butterflies and also the large red and blue-tailed damsel-flies. The small pearl-bordered fritillary historically was present on the site but is now extinct locally.

=== Conservation ===
Conservation measures to prevent the marsh from drying out includes coppicing of the alder in the central area and the removal of bracken.

== Publications ==
- Kelham, A, Sanderson, J, Doe, J, Edgeley-Smith, M, et al., 1979, 1990, 2002 editions, 'Nature Reserves of the Gloucestershire Trust for Nature Conservation/Gloucestershire Wildlife Trust'
- 'Where to see Wildlife in the Forest of Dean', January 2012, Gloucestershire Wildlife Trust
