= Bixslade =

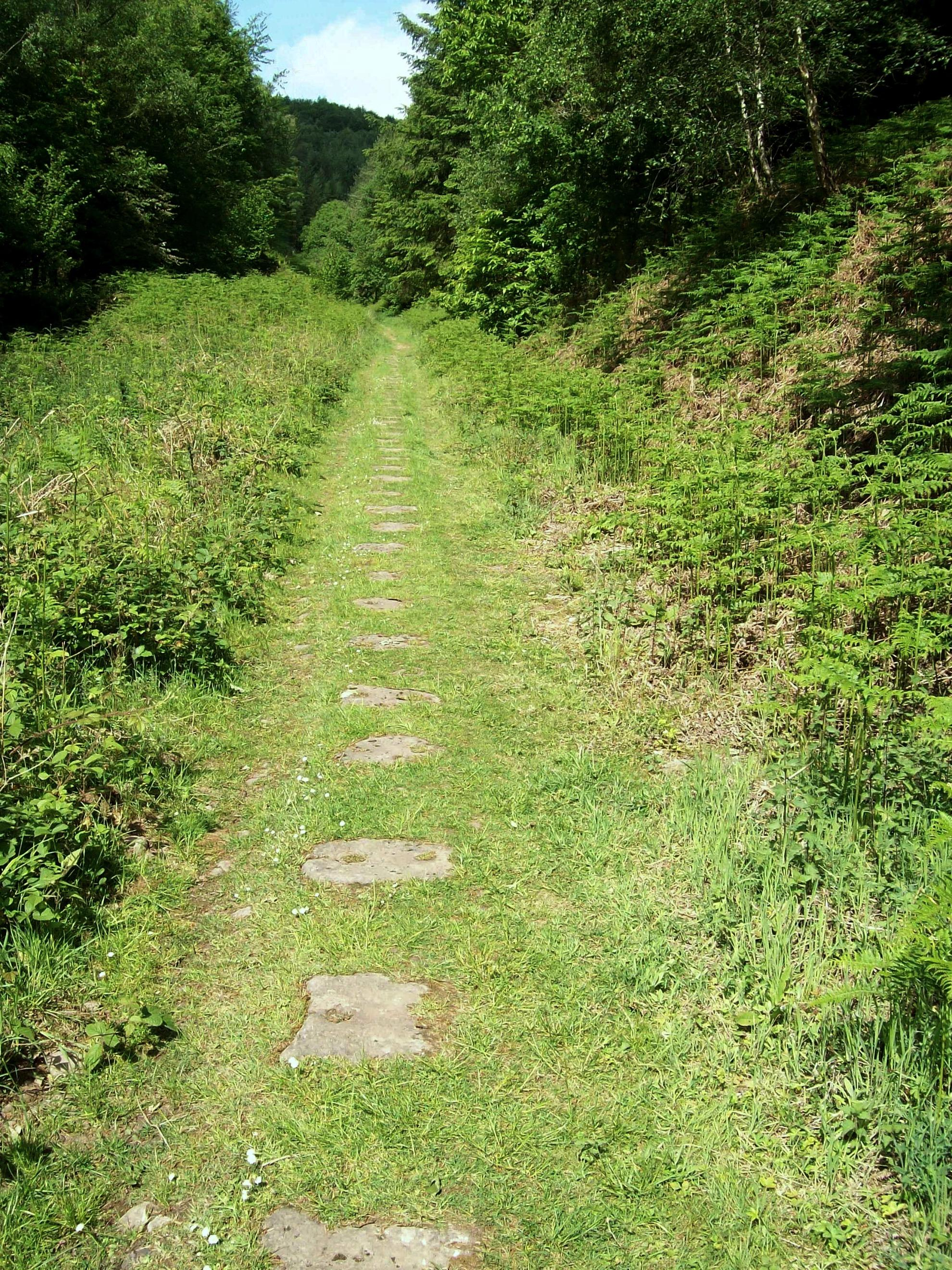
The Bixslade valley.

Bixslade, occasionally written Bix Slade, is a short, steep-sided, valley in the Forest of Dean, Gloucestershire, England. It begins on high ground at Bixhead, near Broadwell, and descends sharply to meet the Cannop Valley at Stonyhill Green. Bixslade has been quarried or mined continuously for over 500 years and has been described as "one of the country's finest areas of extractive industrial heritage".

Many abandoned workings are still evident in the valley and are now home to a variety of wildlife, lichens, mosses and other plant life. Three quarries and a Freemine also continue to operate, largely hidden by the picturesque woodland.

== Geology ==
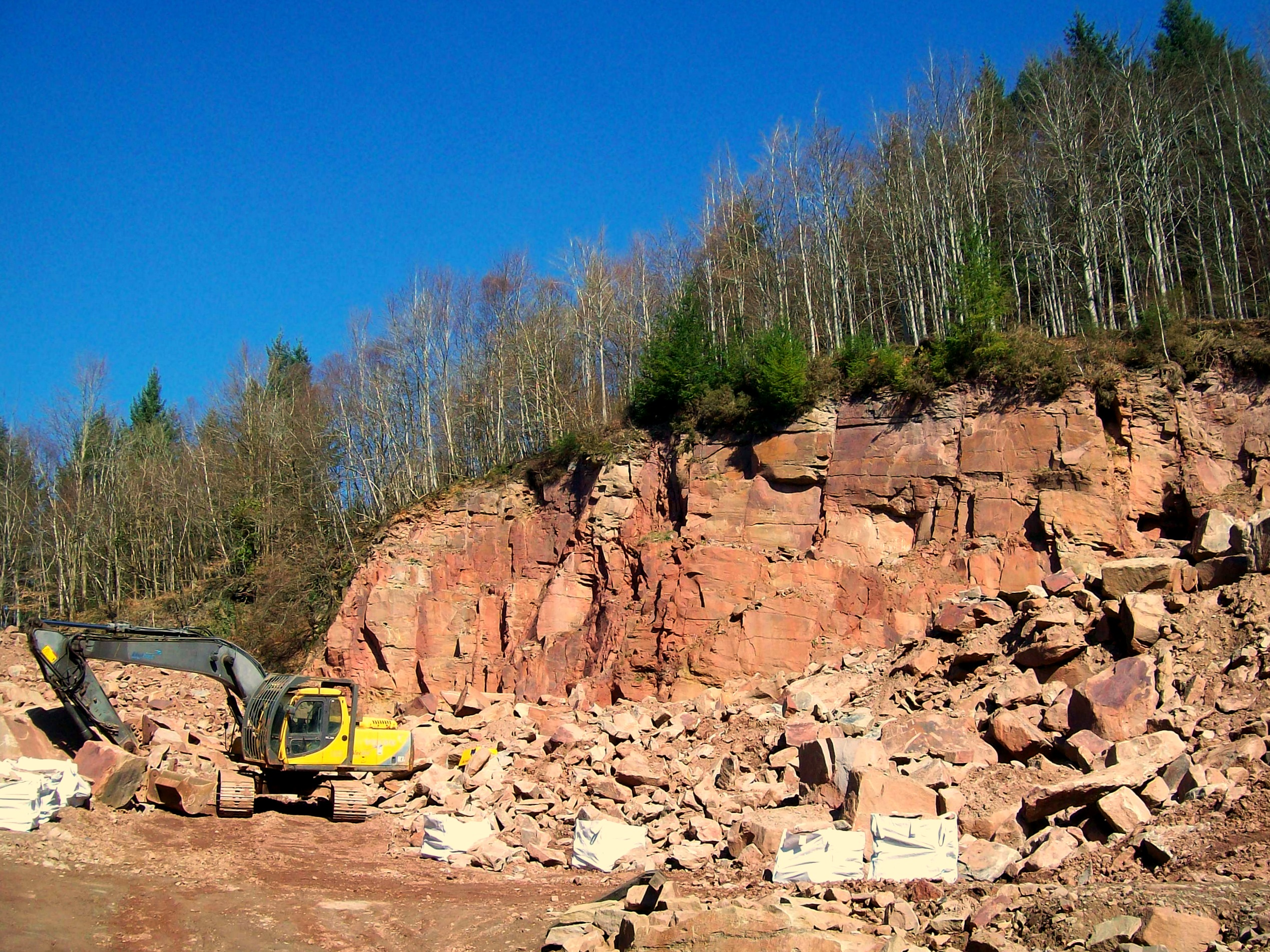
Pennant Sandstone being quarried at Mine Train Quarry.

The Forest of Dean sits on a basin plateau, formed of a fractured asymmetrical syncline composed of Upper Palaeozoic rocks from the Silurian, Devonian and Carboniferous periods. The rocks of the Bixslade valley consist of massive Pennant Sandstone, interbedded with shale and coal seams.

Iron-ore is present in the sandstone along the northern side of the valley, giving it a distinctive pink colour (see photograph). This is unusual for the Forest of Dean, where iron-ore is normally found in limestone.

Two coal seams can be accessed from Bixslade; the 'Yorkley Seam' and the 'Coleford High Delph'. Both ascend from the foot of the valley, rising with the valley floor. The Yorkley seam outcrops roughly one third of the way up, while the underlying Coleford High Delph continues towards Coleford without outcrop.

== Nature ==
A wide range of natural habitats exist in the valley, including deciduous and coniferous woodland, open glades and wet areas. Human activity has also created numerous sites which have since been reclaimed by nature. Underground workings provide a habitat for greater and lesser horseshoe bats, whilst disused quarries are especially suited to reptiles, lichens, mosses, liverworts and ferns. Spion Kop Quarry (disused) is now a nature reserve managed by the Gloucestershire Wildlife Trust, and is open to the public.

== Bicslade Tramroad ==
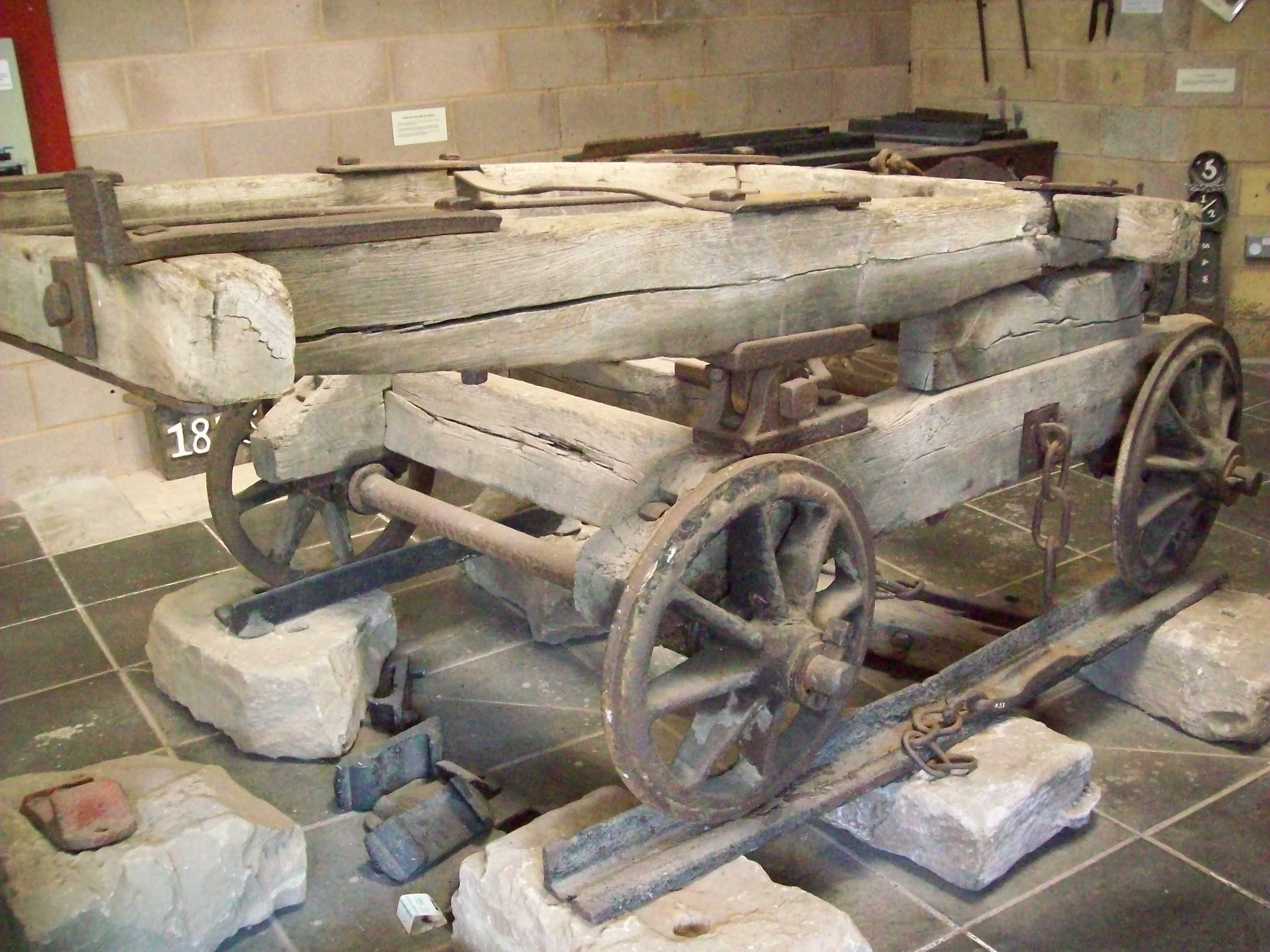
Bicslade Tram, at the Dean Heritage Centre.

In 1812, the Severn and Wye Railway and Canal Company added a branch line to the Severn and Wye Railway (actually a horse-drawn tramroad) to serve the collieries and quarries in the lower part of the Bixslade valley. It was named the Bicslade Tramroad, although the reason for the different spelling is not known. It was extended over time to run the full length of the valley, with the last stretch to Bixhead Quarry opening in 1855. The branch closed in 1946, but large numbers of stone sleepers remain.

== Exploitation of Bixslade ==
=== Historic ===
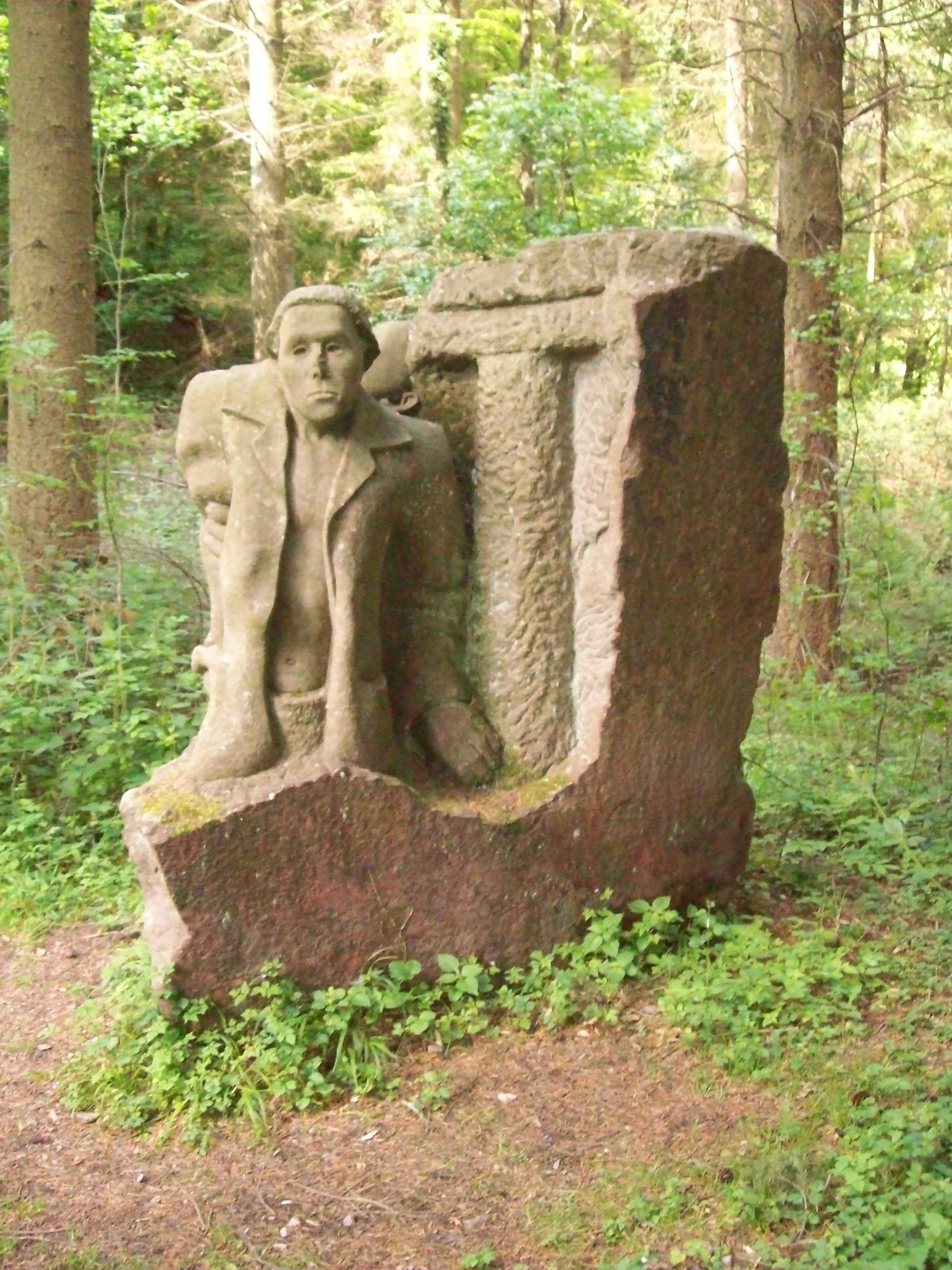
Monument at the site of Union Pit.

Some of the smaller quarries are accessible, but most of the disused workings in the valley are fenced and may only be viewed from a distance. In all cases, however, extreme care must be taken when visiting sites.

The earliest surviving documents record quarrying activity at Bixhead, the highest point of Bixslade, from the 15th century onwards, although extraction is likely to have taken place long before this date. Two large disused quarries exist today at Bixhead (neither are open to the public). Other disused quarries also exist, on both sides, further down the valley; the largest being Spion Kop.

Several disused levels and shafts can also be seen in the valley, although none can be accessed. The Yorkley seam outcrops in the lower half of the valley and was worked using relatively short drifts or shallow pits, but the thicker, and more important, Coleford High Delph seam could only be reached via shafts or longer levels, also called drifts.

In the lower part of the valley is a monument, marking the site of Union Pit. It commemorates four miners who were killed, and three others who were trapped for five days, by flooding in 1902.

=== Current ===
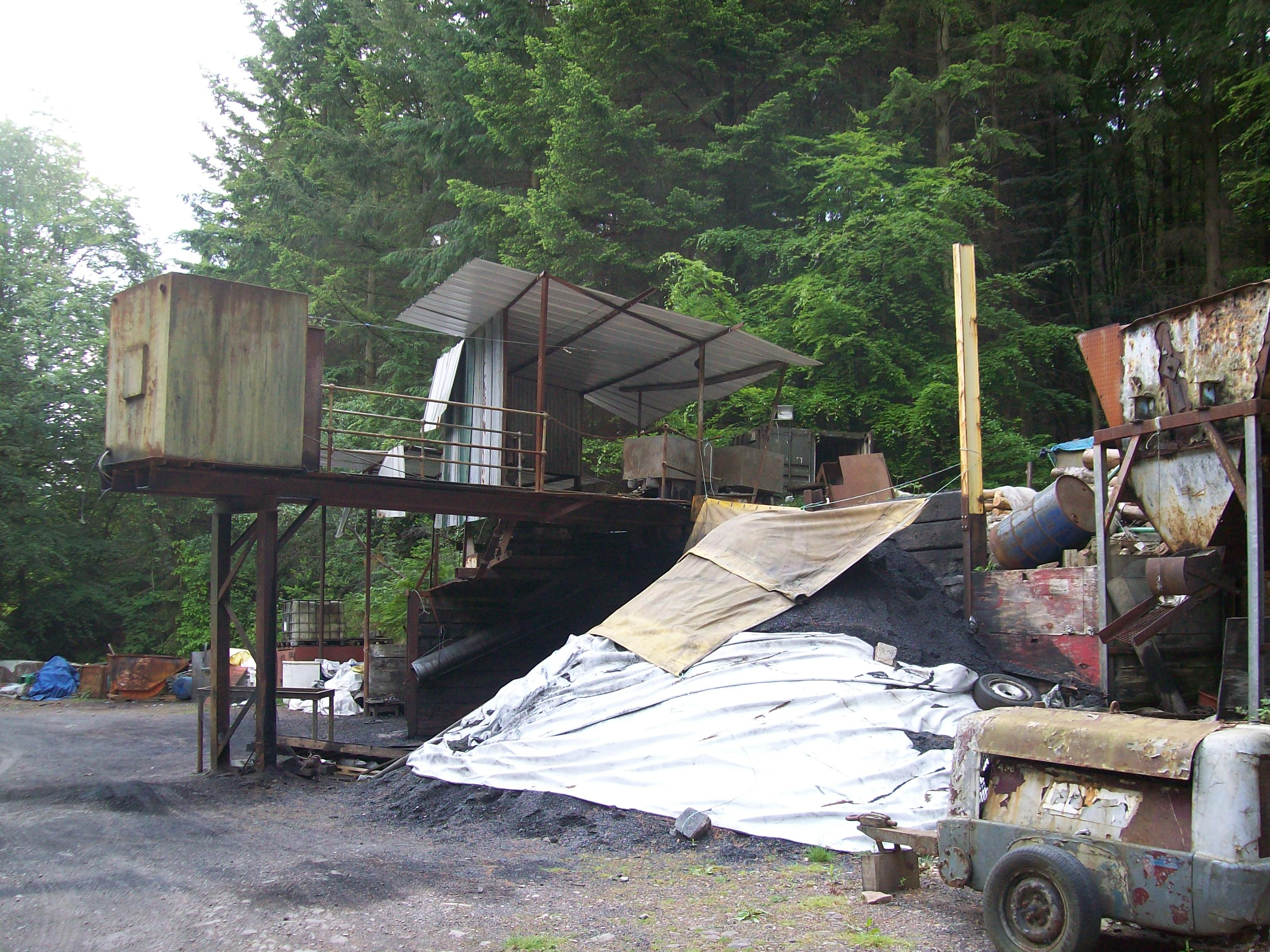
Monument Freemine.

Three quarries; Monument Quarry, Mine Train Quarry and Bixhead Quarry still operate at Bixslade, producing Pennant Sandstone. No public access exists to any of the working sites at Bixslade.

Larger blocks from Bixhead and Mine Train are transported by road to be processed in a nearby stoneworks at Cannop Ponds, whilst Monument Quarry mostly produces walling stone.

One working freemine also remains in the valley; Monument Colliery, formerly Hayner's Bailey. It works the Yorkley Seam via 200yd inclined drift.

== See also ==
- Geology of the Forest of Dean
- Forest of Dean Coalfield
- Cannop Ponds
