= Spion Kop Quarry =

Nature reserve in Gloucestershire

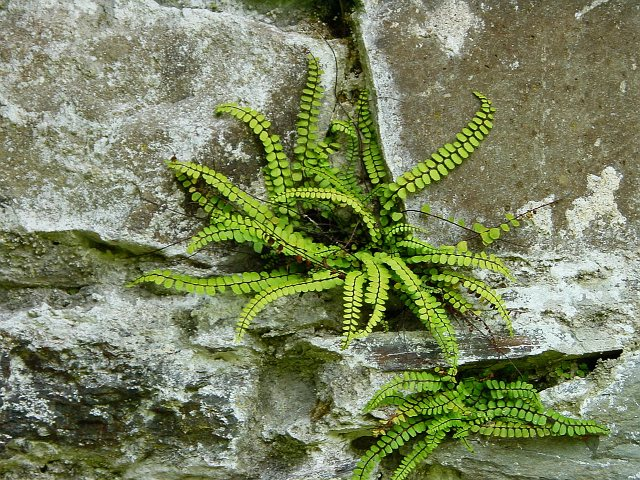
- Maidenhair spleenwort (Asplenium trichomanes) growing between stones

- Location within Gloucestershire
- Type: Gloucestershire Wildlife Trust nature reserve
- Location: Purples Hill, near Coleford
- Coordinates: 51°47′25.27″N 2°35′0.67″W
- Area: 1.7 acres (0.69 ha)
- Created: 1985
- Operator: Gloucestershire Wildlife Trust
- Status: Open all year, restrictions on climbing the rock face

Spion Kop Quarry (grid reference SO598103) is a 0.7-hectare (1.7-acre) nature reserve in Gloucestershire in the Forest of Dean.

The site is managed by the Gloucestershire Wildlife Trust and held under agreement with the Forestry Commission. The site is listed in the 'Forest of Dean Local Plan Review' as a Key Wildlife Site (KWS).

== Location and use ==
The site is on Purples Hill and about 1 1/2 miles (2.4 km) to the east of Coleford. It lies in the middle of the Nagshead and Barnhill Plantations. It is a large, deep quarry and is considered to be the best example of a quarry in the Dean Coal Measures. The quarry's stone blocks would have been durable and much prized for buildings. The quarry is one of many in the Bixslade area which are on Pennant Sandstone.

The quarry became disused in the early 20th century. Shropshire Archives (sic) have photographs of it in operation. It is remote and has developed an interesting flora and fauna. As a consequence there are restrictions on the use of the rock faces for mountaineering purposes. In particular, no climbing is allowed in the nesting season, and the faces which have the best plant growth are not permitted in the climbing routes.

== The site ==
The main rock face is approximately 100 feet (30 m) high. It consists of three parts: a south bay, a north bay, and a central tower. Opposite the south bay is a small west-facing wall. Vistas across the Cannop Valley can be seen from the spoil tips to the east of the reserve. The boundaries of the reserve are marked with safety fencing.

== Flora ==
This is an area for ferns and many grow in the rock crevices. They include maidenhair spleenwort, lady-fern, scaly male-fern, western polypody and hard fern. Other species recorded are tutsan, bilberry, wood sage and foxglove. Mosses thrive on the boulders.

There is a plantation of Douglas fir and beech to the west of the reserve. Scrub includes holly, gorse bushes, rowan, birch, goat willow, hawthorn and elder.

== Birds ==
Nesting birds include common redstart, great tit and blue tit. The wood warbler and turtle dove are recorded visitors.

== Conservation ==
Vistas are maintained to allow the rock face to be seen from beyond the boundary fence. Monitoring is done of the effect on the flora of the climbing activity.

== Walks ==
There is a publication which details places to visit for recreation, and for observing particular wildlife in this part of the Forest of Dean.

== Publications ==
- Kelham, A, Sanderson, J, Doe, J, Edgeley-Smith, M, et al., 1979, 1990, 2002 editions, 'Nature Reserves of the Gloucestershire Trust for Nature Conservation/Gloucestershire Wildlife Trust'
- ‘Nature Reserve Guide – discover the wild Gloucestershire on your doorstep’ - 50th Anniversary, January 2011, Gloucestershire Wildlife Trust
- 'Where to see Wildlife in the Forest of Dean', January 2012, Gloucestershire Wildlife Trust
