= North Ings Farm Museum =

Farm museum in Dorrington, England

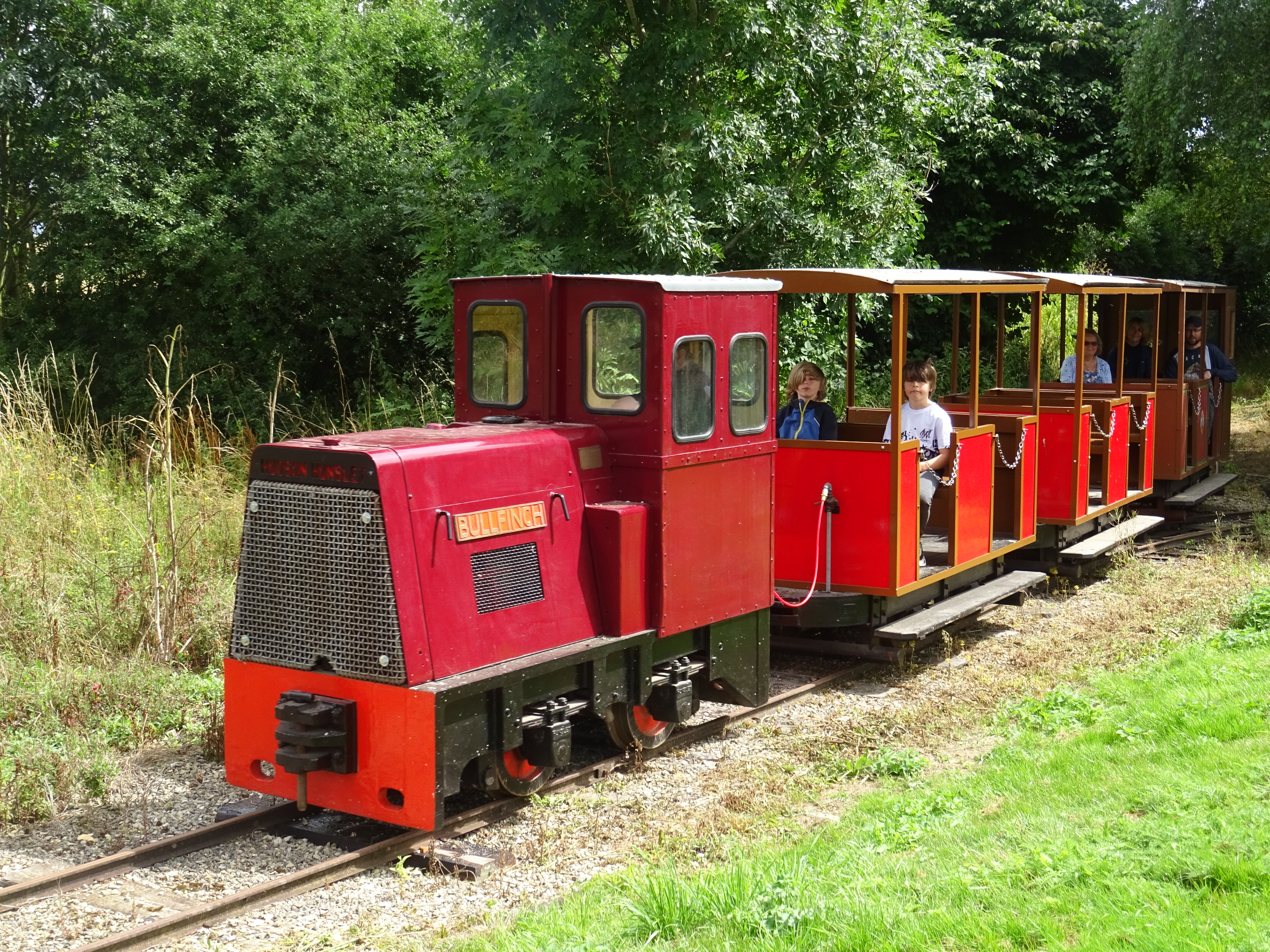
- Hunslet locomotive No. 7120 Bullfinch with a train on the museum's railway

- Location within Lincolnshire
- Established: 1990
- Location: Dorrington, Lincolnshire
- Coordinates: 53.0599°N 0.3635°W
- Type: farm museum
- Website: northingsfarmmuseum.co.uk

The North Ings Farm Museum is a working farm museum containing a 2 ft (610 mm) narrow gauge railway, running on a circuit of 1/4 mile (0.40 km). It is located at Dorrington, between Lincoln and Sleaford, in Lincolnshire. The museum includes agricultural machinery and tractors, commercial vehicles, portable steam pumps and a fairground organ. The collection was opened to the public in 1990.

== Locomotive Fleet ==
=== Steam Locomotives ===
- 1859401 Swift

=== Internal Combustion Locomotives ===
- Clay Cross Lister Built from Lister spare parts by Clay Cross Co Ltd
- Hunslet 6013
- Hunslet 7120 Bullfinch
- LOD / 758022 Motor Rail 8826 Penelope
- Motor Rail 7493
- R&H 183773
- R&H 200744 Indian Runner
- R&H 371937
- R&H 375701
- R&H 421433
- O&K Works number not known

== Gallery ==
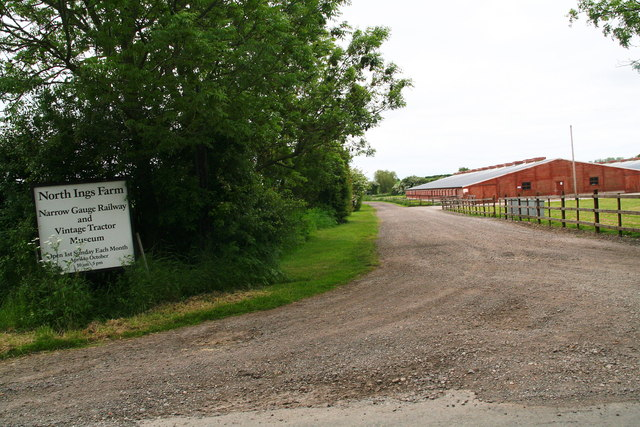
Entrance to North Ings Farm Narrow Gauge Railway and Vintage Tractor Museum

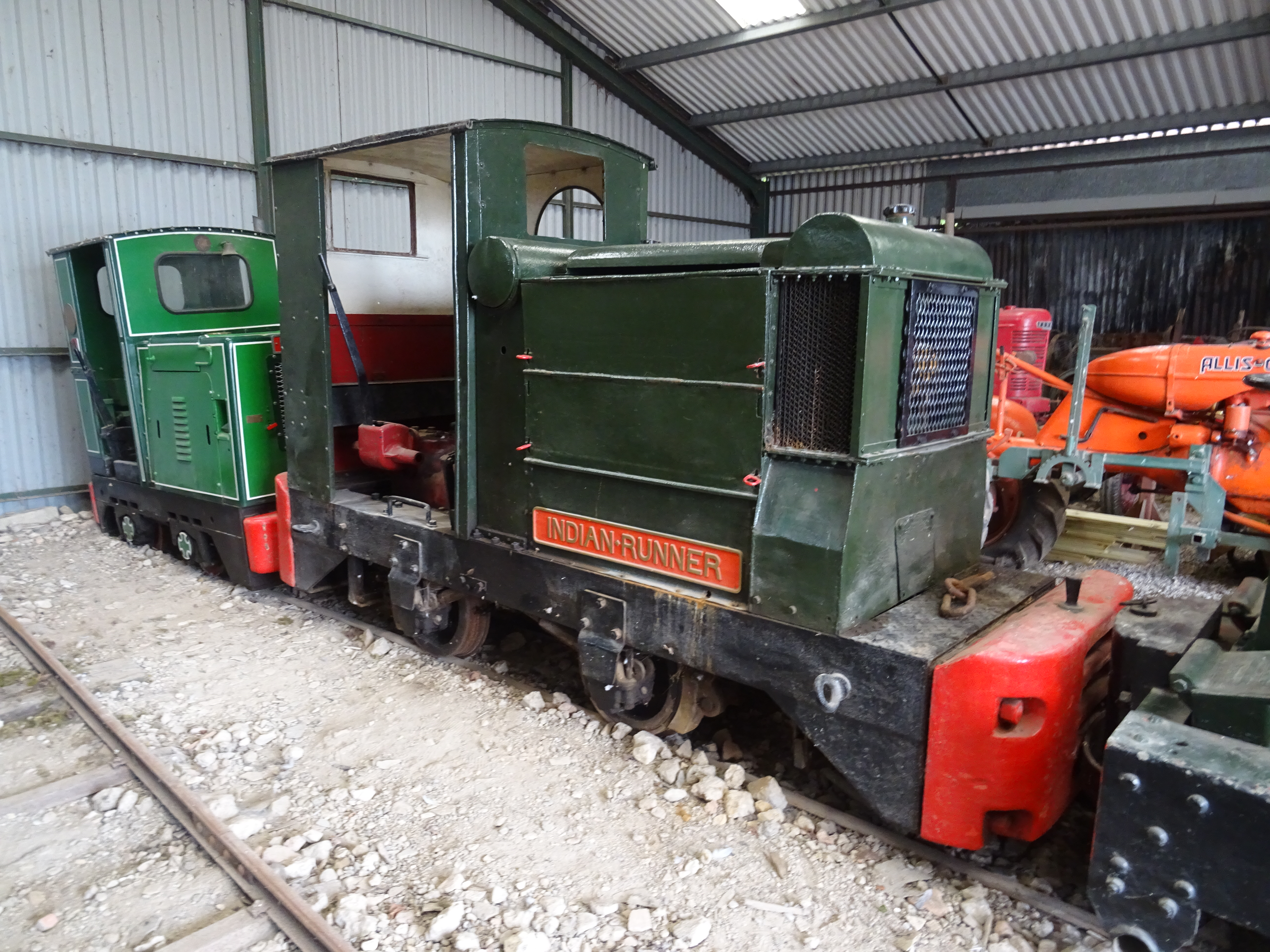
Indian Runner on display in the loco shed.
