= Eastridge Mountain Bike Trail Centre =

Mountain biking venue in Shropshire, England

Eastridge
- Location within England

Highest point
- Coordinates: 52°37′24″N 2°54′20″W

Geography
- Location: Shropshire, England

Eastridge Mountain Bike Trail Centre is a free mountain biking venue in Shropshire, UK. The venue is developed and maintained by volunteers, and features a mixture of blue, red and black graded trails. There are also a number of steep, technical off-piste trails. Since 1991 Eastridge Woods have been used to host Downhill and XC mountain biking events since the 90's hosted the British National Mountain biking Championships in 1993, 1994, 1995, 1996 and 1999.

== Geology ==
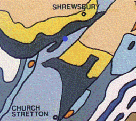
A geological map of the area.

Eastridge Wood is located in the Shropshire Hills, between the Villages of Habberley, Minsterley and Snailbeach, it lies east of the quartzite ridge known as the Stiperstones. The Rocky outcrop that forms Eastridge is known as the Habberly Formation and is thought to correlate with the Hunnebergian Stage of Scandinavia. It is the youngest known tremadoc in the Welsh Borderlands geological area.

== Trail partnership ==
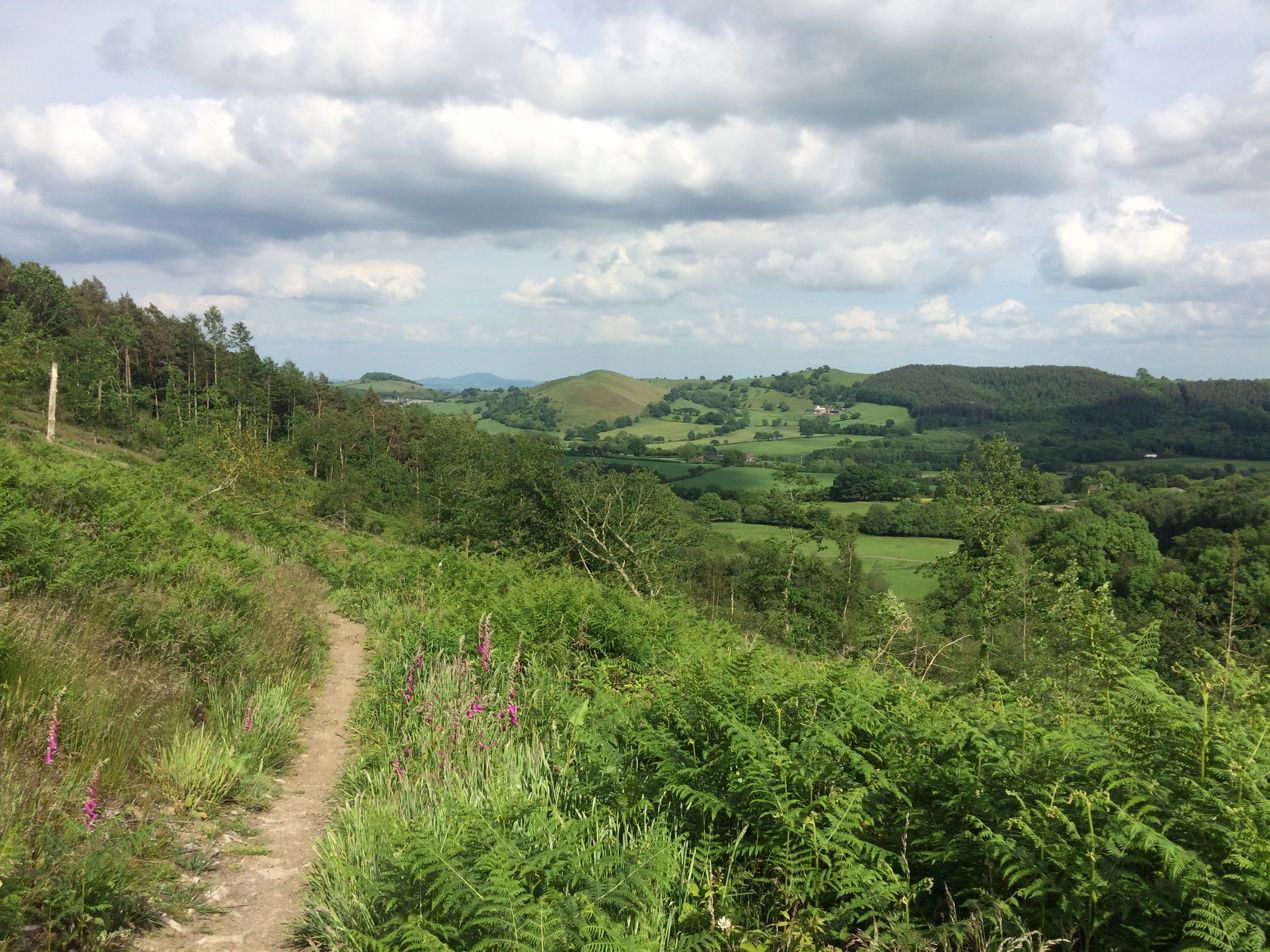
A view of the Shropshire hills from the Goliath Climb.

The trails are located on Forestry England land and are signposted from the A5 near, Shrewsbury. The trails were built, run and maintained by a group of volunteers.

== History ==
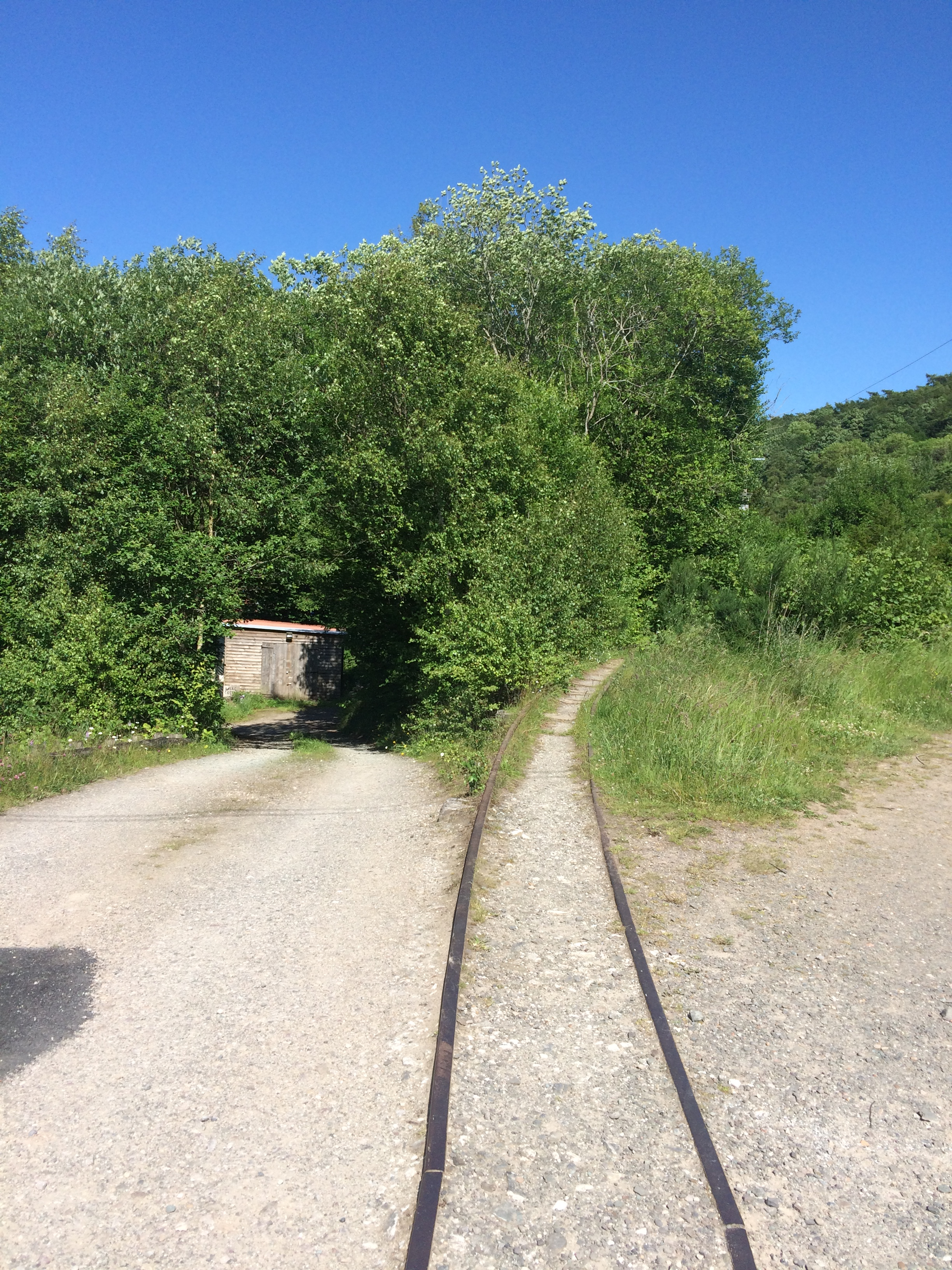
Relics of the old railway network that ran through Eastridge

=== Pre mountainbike years ===
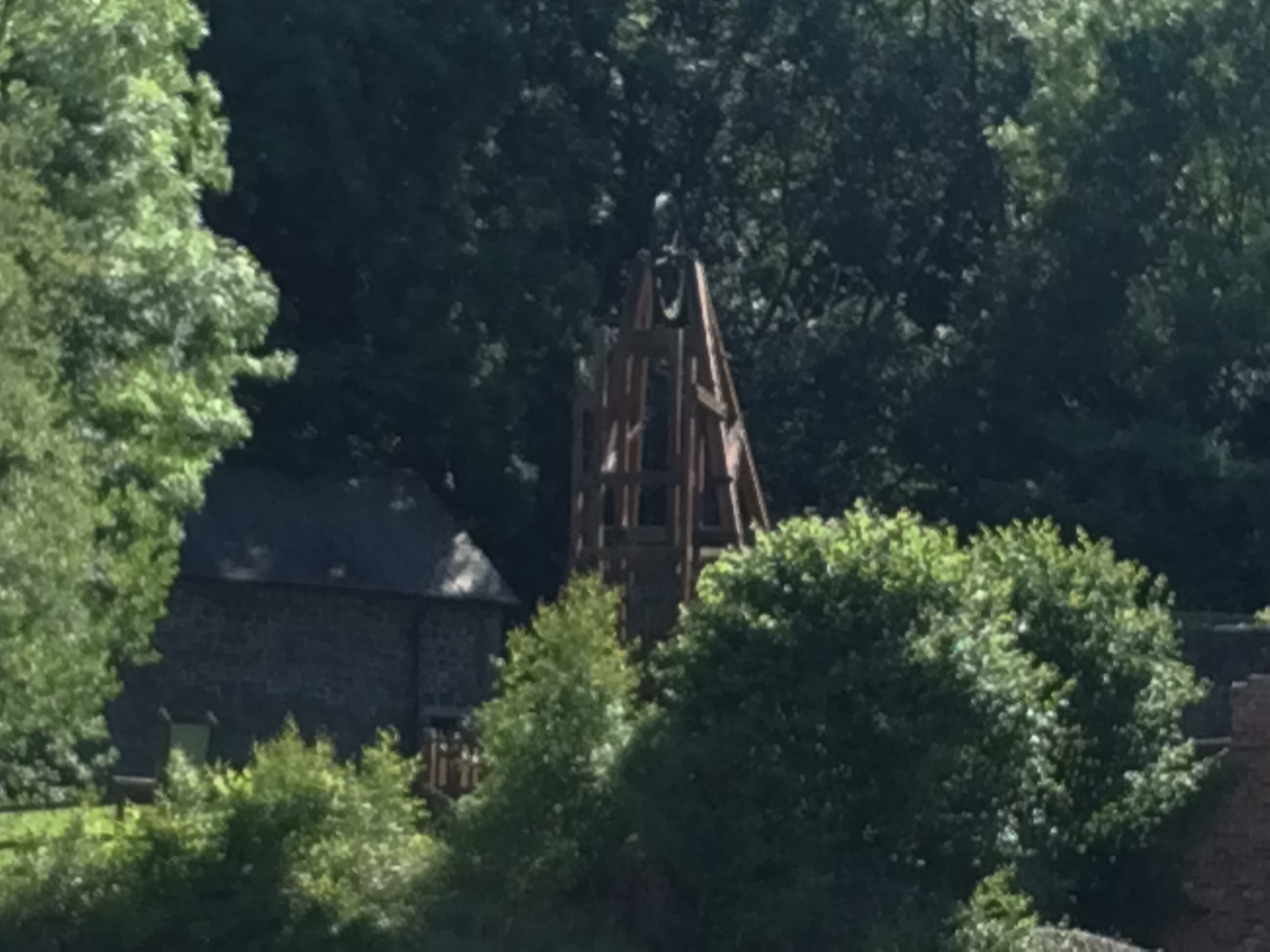
View of Snailbeach from the bottom of the Topography Trail.

The area was mined for lead and other minerals until 1955. At one point it was believed to be the most productive lead mine in Europe, it even had its own railway network: Snailbeach District Railways. Relics from the mine workings can still be found today at the nearby village of Snailbeach.

=== Early history ===
The first races at the venue were organised by local cycling club, the Mid Shropshire Wheelers in collaboration with the British cycling federation. In 1998 the venue hosted a round of the National Mountain Bike Points Series and featured in the satellite TV program Mountain Bike Britain.

=== Gravity Enduro resurgence ===
Eastrige fell out of favor as a downhill venue due to longer and steeper courses being built in other parts of the UK. However it experienced something of a resurgence in popularity due to the emergence of the gravity enduro mountain bike discipline. Recent years have seen the venue continuing to host British Cycling Federation sanctioned cross country mountain bike races at regional level, as well as national level gravity enduro races.

== Marked Trails ==
=== The Easty Blue ===
A low difficulty trail of 2.8 km in length, the Easty blue is aimed at beginners.

=== Revelation Trail ===
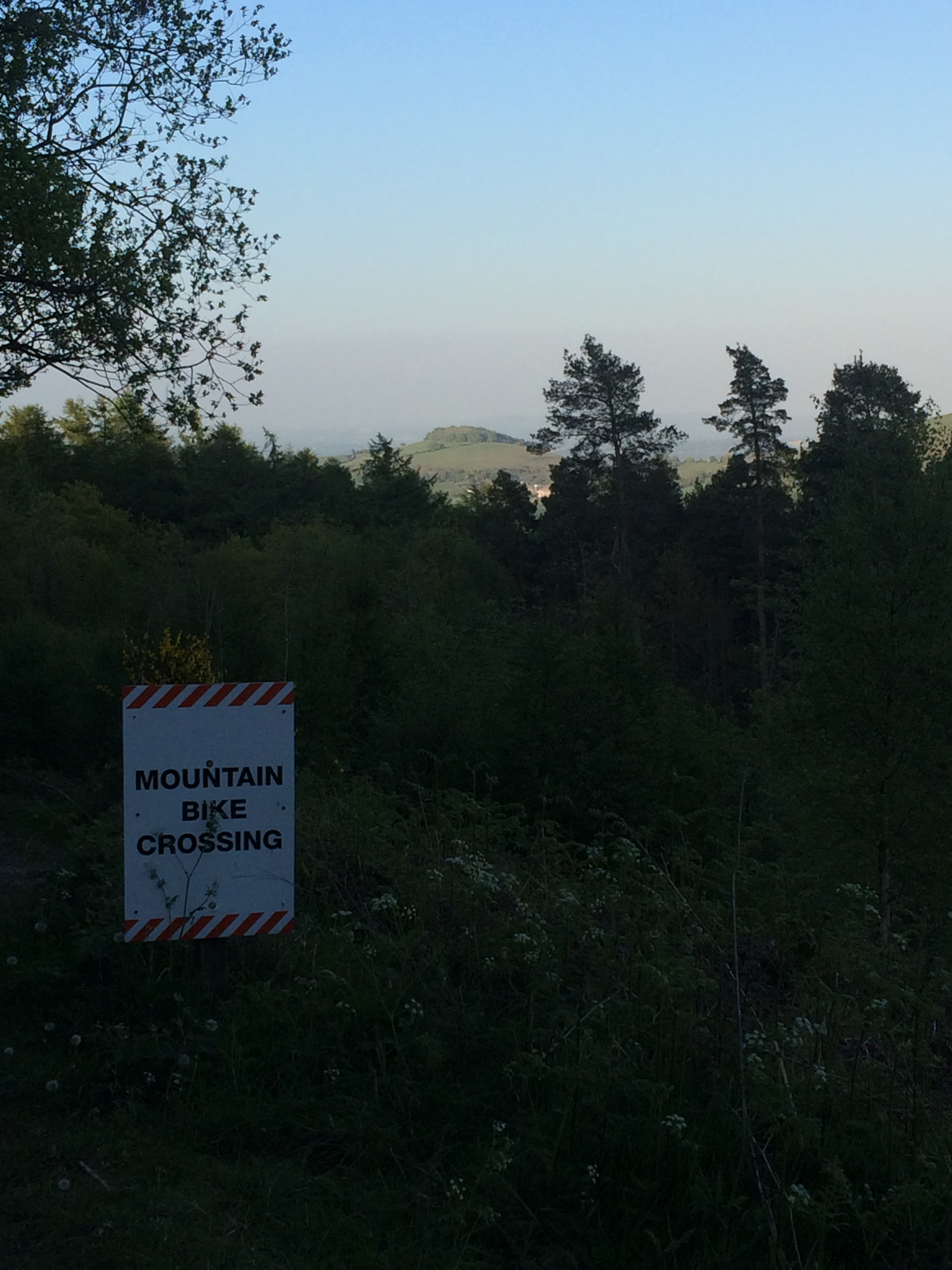
Road Crossing on Student Championships Downhill Course.

This 8 kilometer loop is graded Red for difficult and covers many of the venue's most popular descents including; Son and Daughter, Big Log and Topography. The latter of which passes the mine workings in the village of Snailbeach. The trail is approximately 8 kilometers in length and was built in partnership with The Eastridge Trail Partnership, Revelation is composed of tight twisty single track, off camber traverses, roots, rocks, ruts, climbs and hairpin bends. The natural, rough nature of the trail regularly divides opinion; with some favoring its rough natural terrain and others deriding it for its lack of bike park style features.

=== 2006 student champs downhill course ===
In 2006 the BUSA National Student Downhill Mountain biking championships were held at Eastridge after the venue was changed from Moelfre days before the event was due to take place. The course is graded black for experienced riders only and consists of a relatively flat but rocky top section with two jumps and a much steeper and very rocky bottom section. Beginning in 2009 the course has been included as a stage in several gravity enduro races including the UK gravity enduro series and is known for being fast, rocky and technical.

=== 99 Nationals course ===
At just 0.5 km the 99 Nationals course is relatively short. The 99 Nationals course was used for the 1999 National Mountain Bike championships. Since then it has been used in regional level downhill races and national level gravity enduro races.

== Controversies ==
Eastridge is home to a large network of unmarked trails, many of which are used for races.

In 2019, local residents claimed that the unofficial trails were posing a threat to the area’s flora and fauna, and a farmer claimed that clandestine trail builders diverted his water supply. Forestry England subsequently closed several unmarked trails.

== Facilities ==
As Eastridge Trail Centre is free and run by volunteers facilities are limited to a small carpark.

== Past events held in Eastridge Woods ==
- UK Gravity Enduro Series, 2018.
- Welsh Gravity Enduro 2017, round 4.
- Cannondale British Enduro Series, 2016.
- Midlands XC round 6, 2015.
- Midlands XC round 4, 2014.
