= Forest of Dean Cycle Centre =

Cycling centre in Gloucestershire, England

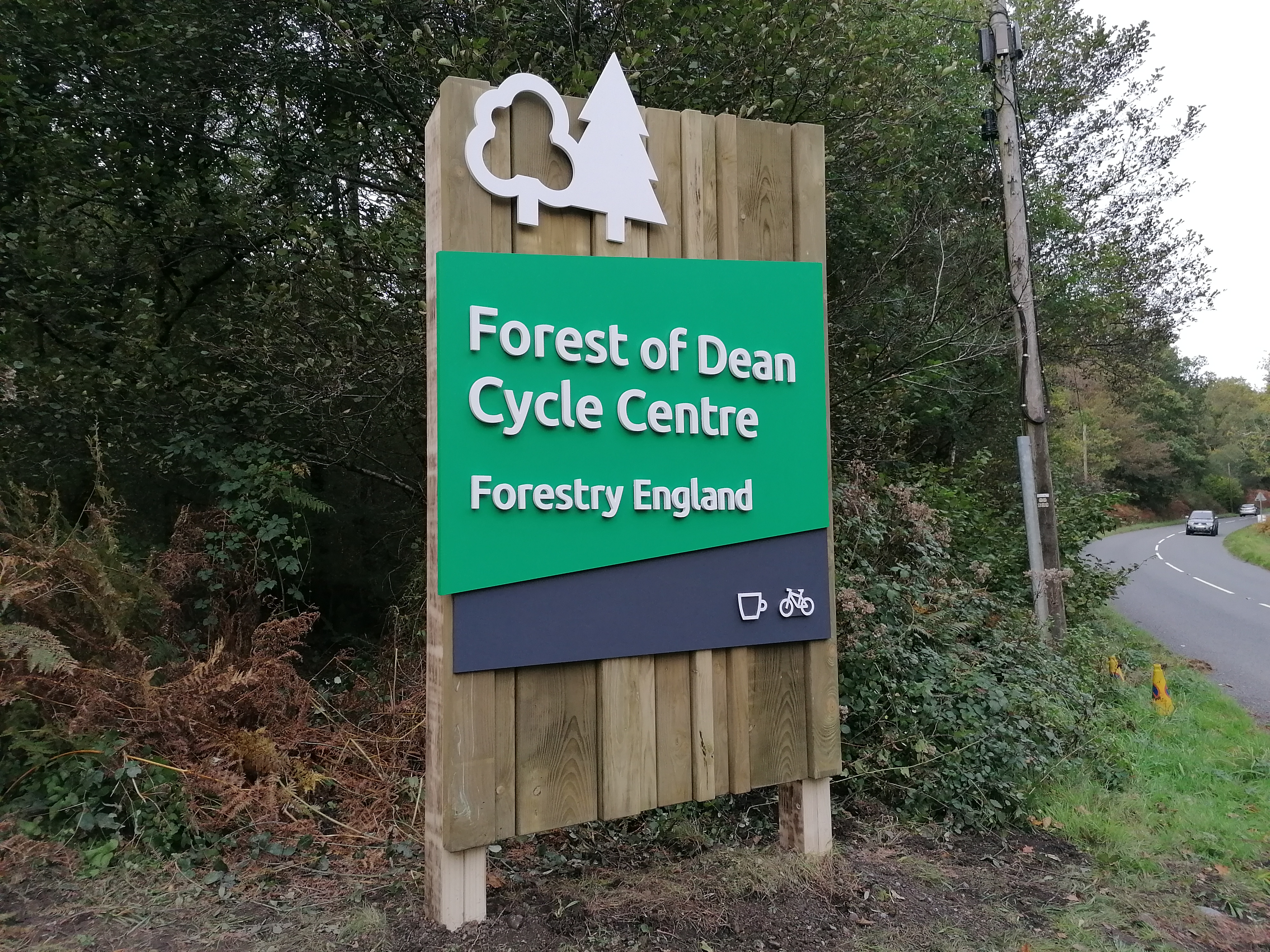
- Entrance to the cycle centre
- Interactive map of Forest of Dean Cycle Centre
- Type: Cycle Centre
- Location: Cannop, Forest of Dean, Gloucestershire, UK
- Coordinates: 51°47′N 2°34′W
- Operator: Forestry England
- Open: All year

Forest of Dean Cycle Centre is a small woodland cycling centre, comprising mountain bike trails, a visitor centre, car parks and uplift service. It is located on the former site of Cannop Colliery in the Cannop Valley, Forest of Dean, Gloucestershire. The nearest village is Parkend, 3 miles (5 km) away.

In 2012, work was completed on a £100,000 redevelopment of the centre, culminating in the opening of a new cycle bridge.

== Facilities ==
Use of the visitor centre and trails is completely free. There is a charge for car parking and some facilities, such as use of the bike wash.

Facilities include;

- Visitor centre comprising a café, bike shop, bike hire, bike repair workshop, showers, toilets, bike wash and compressed air.
- Uplift service - Mini bus and purpose built trailer which transports riders to the top of the downhill runs.
- Several large car parks
- Picnic area.
- Information boards.

== Trails ==
Three main waymarked trails start and finish at the cycle centre;

=== The Freeminers Trail (formerly the FODCA Trail) ===
A 7-mile (11 km) all-weather loop, designed, built and maintained by volunteers in partnership with the Forestry Commission. This is a challenging and varied single track with several tricky switchback climbs, rooty drops and hairpin bends. The trail is graded RED on the CTC classification of cycle trails and is suitable for experienced riders only. It received a glowing report from Mountain Biking UK magazine, when they reviewed it in 2008.

=== The Verderers' Trail ===
This is a 7-mile (11 km) fast flowing single track trail with flat out corners, big berms and rollovers. It is graded BLUE on the CTC classification of cycle trails, but also incorporates several RED alternative sections. It gently winds uphill before a swooping, flat top section and a steep undulating descent known as the Dragon's Tail. This trail was also reviewed by Mountain Biking UK in March 2012, who scored it as 4 out of 5 stars, describing the berms as 'the very best they'd ever ridden'.

=== Family Cycle Trail ===
An 9-mile (14 km) circuit, with connecting spurs to several local villages. Follows wide gravelled tracks and is suitable for riding all year round. Mostly level gradients with some short climbs and suitable for all ages and abilities. The route passes along the old Severn and Wye railway line, passing former stations at Drybrook Road, Cannop Wharf and Speech House. Remnants of former coalmines can also be seen at Foxes Bridge, Lightmoor and New fancy.

In July 2007, the Forest of Dean Family Cycle Trail was number one in a list of 'Best British cycle routes', published by The Guardian And in June 2009, it was voted the best 'family cycle route' by The Daily Telegraph.

== Downhill tracks ==
In addition to the waymarked trails there are seven or more excellent downhill tracks. From the visitor centre, a short push-up path leads to the downhill tracks. The route initially follows the Freeminers Trail and is marked by white arrows on a yellow background.

Most of the downhill tracks are easy to find, with several beginning at a trailhead just to the east of the top information board. The shorter trails start further down the hill. All the downhill tracks feature difficult technical sections, big jumps, steep drops and one; GBU, features two very tricky drop-offs. Other downhill tracks include Endo, Mr Rooty, Flatlands, Corkscrew and Sheepskull.
