= Gullane Entertainment =

Defunct British independent production company

- Formerly: Burginhall 126 Limited (1987); The Britt Allcroft Group Limited (1987–1996); The Britt Allcroft Company PLC (1996–2000); Gullane Entertainment PLC (2000–2002)
- Type: Private
- Industry: Entertainment
- Predecessor: Britt Allcroft Limited; Quality Family Entertainment
- Founded: 6 April 1987; 39 years ago (Note: The predecessor company, Britt Allcroft Railway Ltd, or Britt Allcroft Ltd, was founded in 1979. This company is now known as Gullane (Thomas) Ltd)
- Founders: Britt Allcroft; Angus Wright
- Defunct: 4 December 2002; 23 years ago
- Fate: Acquired by and folded into HIT Entertainment (Note: While folded, the "Gullane Entertainment" company itself still functions as a dormant subsidiary.)
- Headquarters: Southampton, England
- Divisions: Gullane Children's Books
- Subsidiaries: CCI Entertainment (stake); Phoenix Animation Studios (stake); Bridgefilms/Sooty Limited (joint venture with Sooty International); The Media Merchants; Prism Art & Design Limited (joint venture with S4C International)

Gullane Entertainment PLC was a British independent production company which produced children's programming, including Thomas & Friends (1984–2021), Shining Time Station (1989–1995), The Magic Adventures of Mumfie (1994–1998), Captain Pugwash (1950–2008), Art Attack (1990–2007), Sooty (1955–present) and Fireman Sam (1987–present). The company was purchased by HIT Entertainment in 2002, and went defunct within the same year. As of today, most of Gullane's library is currently owned by toy company Mattel as a result of their subsequent acquisition of HIT Entertainment.

== History ==
=== Britt Allcroft Ltd ===
The company was originally formed in 1981, initially as Britt Allcroft Railway Productions and then Britt Allcroft Limited. It was formed after Britt Allcroft purchased the rights to The Railway Series in 1979.

When The Britt Allcroft Company was established separately, this division was renamed Britt Allcroft (Thomas) Ltd in 1987, holding all media rights to Thomas the Tank Engine. With the Gullane rebranding, it became Gullane (Thomas) Ltd in 2000 and remains as such to this day.

=== The Britt Allcroft Company ===
The company produced the third to fifth series of Thomas the Tank Engine & Friends.

In the late 1980s, the company formed Quality Family Entertainment, an American subsidiary to produce an adapted version of the series, Shining Time Station.

In 1994, the company announced a strategic international alliance with Canadian-based company Catalyst Entertainment, which previously co-produced Shining Time Station with TBAC.

In March 1995, the company, through Catalyst Entertainment, purchased a stake in the Toronto-based Phoenix Animation Studios.

In June 1997, the company announced they had purchased the rights to Captain Pugwash and would subsequently produce a new television series featuring the character. Within the same year, the company entered into joint ventures to produce animated television series based on James the Cat, Topsy and Tim, and Little Hippo. Earlier on in the year, the company formed a motion picture subsidiary – Gullane Pictures to produce feature films. In November, using a $50 million in funding, Gullane Pictures established a US arm intended to distribute Gullane and Catalyst programming and films in the country, starting with the film Row Your Boat and new seasons of Magic Adventures of Mumfie.

In 1998, the company acquired the underlying rights to The Railway Series from Reed Elsevier for £13.5 million, thus giving the company full control of the Thomas the Tank Engine franchise.

In December 1999, the company acquired a 50% stake in Sooty from then-owner Sooty International, forming a joint venture company called Bridgefilms (also known as Sooty Ltd), which would also handle licensing rights to Magic Adventures of Mumfie.

In March 2000, HIT Entertainment offered a $363 million bid to purchase the company, alongside other interested companies. In the same month, the company announced they had purchased The Media Merchants for £14 million, bringing Art Attack to their list of intellectual properties (IPs).

=== Gullane Entertainment ===
In September 2000, with the negative reception and box-office failure of Thomas and the Magic Railroad, Allcroft stepped down as the company's CEO, and under new leadership, the company announced they would be renamed Gullane Entertainment to expand and export their brands worldwide. Allcroft would however, remain as a creative consultant for the Thomas the Tank Engine franchise (which would be renamed Thomas & Friends within the same year) up until Series 7 in 2003.

Within the announcement of the name change came some new projects, including a new series of Thomas & Friends, an online platform (Planet Gullane), a new series of Art Attack alongside the production of 238 episodes for the international market in a partnership with The Walt Disney Company, a second series of Sooty Heights alongside the production of direct-to-video Sooty material and new seasons of Captain Pugwash, ZZZAP! and It's a Mystery. Gullane also announced production of a full series of Eckhart with Catalyst Entertainment.

In October 2000, Gullane announced to set aside US$50 million to fund a year's worth of productions, including new Thomas-related projects and television movies (which never materialised), with one being a co-production with French company Tele Images for Animal Planet.

In January 2001, Gullane announced they had purchased David & Charles Children's Books for £1.1 million, putting two new franchises: Zippy Dinosaurs and Vroom Vroom, into Gullane's properties.

In March 2001, Gullane announced their profits for the last six months went up 80%. On the same day, the company announced they would produce 26 new episodes of Thomas & Friends for a Summer 2002 delivery, with a co-funding deal with a third party being allowed to coincide with the series' cost at a possible range of 78 new episodes by the next three years. On the same day, Gullane confirmed that Thomas and the Magic Railroad had been sold in over thirty countries worldwide, while Catalyst Entertainment delivered the first series of Eckhart and Longhouse Tales to the company. Earlier on, Gullane announced work on a 2D/3D animated co-production with Catalyst based on the fellow David & Charles book Harry and His Bucket Full of Dinosaurs called Sammy and the Dinosaurs which the company would distribute worldwide.

In July 2001, Gullane purchased Guinness World Records for £45.5 million from their original owners Diageo, although Gullane would continue to license the Guinness brand name from Diageo. By December 2001, the company planned to produce new GWR-themed programming at a young male demographic, and that the publishing division had merged with Dave & Charles Children's Books to form Gullane Publishing.

On 14 September 2001, Gullane signed a distribution deal with Tell-Tale Productions for the production of two new shows, called Ella, and Sprogs.

In November 2001, Gullane was reportedly in talks to buy the entertainment assets of Canadian company CINAR, which had been affected by a financial scandal. However, those talks had fallen through due to either a failure to secure sufficient funding or in-fighting within CINAR's board of directors.

In December 2001, Gullane purchased a majority stake in Fireman Sam from S4C International for £16 million, with both companies agreeing to both produce a new season of 26 episodes and to remaster the previous 4 seasons.

On 13 February 2002, Catalyst Entertainment announced that they had merged with fellow Canadian media company Cambium Entertainment to form CCI Entertainment (Cambium Catalyst International) The merger allowed Gullane to achieve economies of scale and add clarity to their operating profile and added Cambium Entertainment's properties into their now-300-hours worth of programming. Gullane owned a 32% non-voting, 19% voting, interest in the newly enlarged business, and would continue to operate as Gullane's Canadian affiliate and distributor.

On 8 March 2002, Gullane signed a co-production, distribution, and global licensing deal with Collingwood O'Hare Entertainment for the production of a new series titled Yoko! Jakamoko! Toto!, which had been pre-sold to CITV. On 20 March, the company announced 208 new episodes of Art Attack for the European and Latin American markets, alongside 78 new episodes of Thomas & Friends. Gullane had also started remastering the 1974 series of Captain Pugwash around this time.

=== Purchase by HIT Entertainment ===
After approximately two years of negotiation, in July 2002, HIT Entertainment agreed to purchase Gullane Entertainment for £139 million. It was unknown if CCI Entertainment was effected by the purchase.

On 18 September 2002, before HIT's purchase, Gullane's distribution deal with Tell-Tale for Ella and Sprogs fell through, with the rights reverting to Tell-Tale.

The next day, Charles Falzon was terminated from director.

In 4 December 2002, the company switched its "PLC" status to its current "Limited" state.

=== After the purchase ===
In January 2003, Britt Allcroft announced she had resigned as a board director at HIT Entertainment to focus her work on her new company Britt Allcroft Productions and Peter Urie was appointed Group Head of Production to replace her.

In March 2003, CCI Entertainment announced they had ended their partnership with HIT, purchasing out their shares in the company, as well as most of Gullane's catalogue. The shows CCI reacquired were put into the company's CCI Releasing subsidiary.

In October 2007, HIT put the rights to both Mumfie and Sooty up for sale. Britt Allcroft reacquired Magic Adventures of Mumfie in March 2008, while Richard Cadell would purchase the Sooty franchise and brand in June 2008.

In February 2008, HIT sold the Guinness World Records brand and franchise to Ripley Entertainment.

== Filmography ==
Title	Years	Broadcasters	Produced/Distributed by	Notes
Thomas & Friends	1984–2021	ITV (Series 1–3); Cartoon Network (Series 4–5); Nick Jr. (Series 6–7)	Clearwater Features (Series 1–2); Fuji Television Network Inc. (Series 3); Nickelodeon UK (Series 6–7)	Series 1–7; HIT Entertainment handled the next 13 seasons (8–20); Mattel Television handled the last four seasons (21–24)
Shining Time Station	1989–1993; 1995	PBS	Quality Family Entertainment; WNET-TV; Catalyst Entertainment (Series 2–3); YTV Canada (Series 2–3)	
Magic Adventures of Mumfie	1994–1998	CITV (Series 1); Fox Family Channel (Series 2–3; US); Nick Jr. (Series 2–3; UK)	Quality Family Entertainment; D'Ocon Films Productions (Series 3)	
Little Hippo	1997	France 3 (France); ZDF (Germany); RTL-TVI (Belgium); Playhouse Disney (UK & Ireland)	Marina Productions; EVA Entertainment; Neurones	
James the Cat	1984; 1997–1998	CITV	Canning Factory; Moonbeam Ltd	
Captain Pugwash	1974–1975; 1998–2000	BBC 1 (1974 series); CITV (1998 series)	BBC Televistion (1974 series); John Cary Films (1998 series)	Gullane remastered the 1974 series
Row Your Boat	1998	Theatrical release	Preferred Films; 49th Parallel Productions; Waterstreet Productions	Distribution only, as Gullane Pictures
What Katy Did	1999	N/A	Catalyst Entertainment; Tetra Films	TV movie, distribution only
Cinderella & Me	1999	N/A	Catalyst Entertainment	TV movie, distribution only
Art Attack	1990–2007	CITV	The Media Merchants; SMG TV Productions	Handled series 14–15; HIT Entertainment handled the last four seasons (16–19)
ZZZap!	1993–2001	CITV	The Media Merchants; Meridian Television	Handled the show's final season
Shadow Lake	1999	N/A	Catalyst Entertainment	TV movie, distribution only
Sooty Heights	1999–2000	CITV	Sooty Ltd; Granada Media Children's	
Thomas and the Magic Railroad	2000	Theatrical release	Destination Films (US/Canada only); Icon Film Distribution (UK/Ireland only)	Gullane's only feature-length movie to date Handled sales outside the US, Canada, UK and Ireland; Co-funded by The Isle Of Man Film Commission
Virtual Mom	2000	N/A	Catalyst Entertainment; Miracle Pictures	TV movie, distribution only
The Longhouse Tales	2000	TVO/APTN (Canada); CITV (UK)	Catalyst Entertainment; Radical Sheep Productions	Distribution only
Eckhart	2000–2001	Teletoon	Catalyst Entertainment	Distribution only
Sooty's Magic	2000–2002	Direct-to-Video	Sooty Ltd	Gullane's only direct-to-video series to date
Sooty	2001–2004	CITV	Sooty Ltd; Granada Media Children's	HIT Entertainment handled the final season (Series 3)
I Was A Rat	2001	N/A	Catalyst Entertainment	Distribution only
Fireman Sam	1987–present	Children's BBC (Series 1–4; English language); CBeebies (Series 5; English language); S4C (Series 1–5; Welsh language)	Bumper Films (Series 1–4); Sirlol Productions (Series 5)	Handled series 5 Gullane remastered the first four seasons HIT Entertainment handled the next five seasons (6–10); Mattel Television handled all later seasons
Monster by Mistake	1999–2003	YTV (Series 1–2); VRAK.TV (Series 3)	CCI Entertainment	Distribution only
Yoko! Jakamoko! Toto!	2003–2005	CITV	Collingwood O'Hare Entertainment	Series 1 distribution only; HIT Entertainment distributed Series 2

== Key people ==
- Britt Allcroft – co-founder, director, deputy chairman (resigned 7 September 2000)
- Angus Wright – co-founder
- Charles Falzon – president, director (resigned 19 September 2002)
