= List of Magic Adventures of Mumfie episodes =

The following is a list of episodes of the animated series Magic Adventures of Mumfie.

== Series overview ==
Series	Episodes	Originally aired	
Series	Episodes	First aired	Last aired
1	13	September 22, 1994	December 15, 1994
Specials	2	December 23, 1995	September 8, 1996
2	27	August 24, 1998	September 8, 1998
3	39	September 9, 1998	October 6, 1998

== Episodes ==
=== Season 1 (1994) ===
Note: These thirteen episodes were later re-edited into a movie entitled "Magic Adventures of Mumfie: The Movie" by BMG Home Video. This edit is officially given the name of "Mumfie's Quest" by Britt Allcroft Productions and was released under this name in 2014 by Lionsgate.

No. overall	No. in season	Title	Original release date
1	1	"The Beginning Of Things"	September 22, 1994
Mumfie is a special little elephant who lives all alone. One morning, Mumfie sets off to find an adventure and meets some new friends: Scarecrow and Pinkey, a piglet with wings. The three friends set off for an island towards the seaside where they hope to find Pinkey's mother. Songs: "How Big The World Seems", "The Beginning Of Things"
2	2	"A Whale Of Discovery"	September 29, 1994
The mountain on the beach surprises Mumfie when it comes to life. Mumfie and his friends soon find out that there is more to Whale than meets the eye. Whale gives the three friends a ride to the island where Pinkey's mother is being held prisoner. Song: "Always A Welcome In Whales"
3	3	"Pinkey's Mysterious Island"	October 6, 1994
The island is a dark, dangerous place and despite a warning from the mysterious Black Cat, Mumfie continues to dance and sing and gets swept away on the wind, deep below the forest. Mumfie's spirits are soon lifted when he finds Pinkey's mother. Song: "Gotta Dance, Gotta Whistle, Gotta Sing"
4	4	"Definitely Danger"	October 13, 1994
Mumfie is captured by Bristle, the keeper of the Rule Book, and is put to work dusting the wicked Secretary's strange bottle collection. While dusting, Mumfie makes a new friend, Napoleon Jones the raven, and discovers the wonders of the Queen of Night's special jewel. Song: "Just A Waste Of Your Time". "I Must Have My Night" was written for this episode, but was never used. A different arrangement, however, plays as background music in the episode "Foe or Friend?".
5	5	"The Queen Of Night"	October 20, 1994
Scarecrow and Pinkey are searching for Mumfie. Along the way, they encounter the evil Secretary and the beautiful Queen of Night. After learning to skate across the palace floor, they are reunited with Mumfie. Song: "I'm Skating"
6	6	"Bottom Of The Ocean Blues"	October 27, 1994
Mumfie and Scarecrow fly away from the island using the Queen's magic umbrella, towards Whale. Disaster strikes! Aboard Whale, Mrs. Admiral is telling how Mr. Admiral has been captured by pirates. The pirates spot Whale and the chase is on. Song: Bottom of the Ocean Blues
7	7	"Sea of Surprises"	November 3, 1994
Mumfie, Scarecrow, and Mrs. Admiral get separated under the sea. Scarecrow thinks that Mumfie has been eaten by a shark and when he finds Mrs. Admiral, he breaks the sad news to her. Scarecrow is overjoyed when he sees what is behind the big pile of mashed potatoes. Song: "Ocean of Sleep"
8	8	"Sparks In The Dark"	November 10, 1994
Mumfie and Scarecrow decide to enter the pirate cave, and see mysterious flashes of light coming from an unknown place. An accidental trip and fall separates the pair, but with the help of a new friend, the Electric Eel, the two are reunited and find where Mr. Admiral is being held captive. Song: "Pirate Song"
9	9	"Eel Appeal"	November 17, 1994
Mumfie and Scarecrow go head to head against Davy Jones and his pirate crew, and ask to find the Admiral. They find him in the washing room washing the clothes the pirates wear. Meanwhile, Whale has been trapped in a net and Eel uses her electric powers to free him. Song: "Real Eel Electricity". "Admiral's Song" was written for this episode
10	10	"Friendship Is A Circle"	November 24, 1994
Mumfie and Scarecrow are held captive inside the same room as Mr. Admiral and decide to write a message to Napoleon Jones asking for help. Eel and Pinkey then decide to team up together to deliver it safely to the island. After Pinkey takes the letter to Napoleon, Bristle chases after them and Napoleon uses his wings for the first time in years. While this is happening, Mumfie and Scarecrow decide to disguise as a new crew member as a method of escape. Songs: "Friendship is A Circle", "Free As Air" (reprise)
11	11	"The Chase Is On"	December 1, 1994
Scarecrow and Mumfie's disguise seems to fool Nasty Nate and his crew, sounding and looking like a pirate. Davy Jones realizes that the new pirate is actually wearing one of his favorite coats. As this is happening, Mumfie finds the Queen's Jewel in Davy Jones' pocket and is able to retrieve it. The pirates then chase after Mumfie, Scarecrow and The Admiral, but are eventually captured. The Admirals then get reunited. Song: "The Chase"
12	12	"Foe Or Friend?"	December 8, 1994
The Secretary's island is in danger, and Mumfie has to save it. Unfortunately, the Black Cat fools him into jumping down into a peaceful meadow-just for him to be sent to The Secretary of Night's holding cell for trying to bring peace and happiness to the island! That is until someone Mumfie knows very well comes to his rescue... Song: "The Meadows Of Your Mind". "Pigs Can Fly" was written for this episode, but was never used until "Mumfie's White Christmas" with different lyrics.
13	13	"A Treasure Beyond Price"	December 15, 1994
Mumfie, Scarecrow and Pinkey find The Queen's Thimble in a paperweight, but will The Secretary get it first, or will Mumfie and friends bring the story it's happy ending? Song: Home (This episode uses a different arrangement of this song sung by Peter Yawitz.)

=== Specials (1995–96) ===
No.	Title	Written by	Original release date
S1	"Mumfie's White Christmas"	Britt Allcroft and John Kane	December 23, 1995
When the magical bringer of snow, the Snowbird, is in trouble, it's up to Mumfie and his friends Scarecrow and Pinkey to save the day and guarantee a wonderful white Christmas for everyone. Songs: "Pigs Can Fly" (originally supposed to be used in Season 1 of the show), "Let Off Steam", "The Feeling That We Call Christmas"
S2	"Mumfie's Quest: The Movie"	Britt Allcroft and John Kane	September 8, 1996 (Viewer's Choice)
What do you do when you're a little elephant who lives all alone and has no one to play with? If you're an elephant named Mumfie, you set out for an adventure ... and does he ever find it! Along the way, Mumfie makes two wonderful new friends: the wise Scarecrow and Pinkey, an extraordinary piglet with wings. Together, they decide to go in search of Pinkey's long-lost mother and end up on an island ruled by an evil power that forbids laughing, smiling, and joy of any kind. But Mumfie, Scarecrow, and Pinkey discover that their friendship has a power of its own, as they try to rescue Pinkey's mom and return a magical island to happiness. Note: This is a compilation movie of the first 13 episodes of the series with a few cut scenes and the first "Free as Air" and "The Meadows of Your Mind" cut. From 1996 until 2008, the movie was known as "Magic Adventures of Mumfie: The Movie".

=== Season 2 (1998) ===
All episodes in this season were animated by Phoenix Animation Studios. Even though they were produced in 1996, they weren't aired until 1998. Lionsgate accidentally lists episode 27 as part of the D'Ocon episodes, when it was in fact animated by Phoenix. These episodes are listed in the order they are listed in the Season 3 episode "The Album".

Title	Written by	Original release date
"Captain Jellybean's Treasure"	Britt Allcroft and John Kane	August 25, 1998
Mumfie accidentally breaks a picture while playing baseball, but inside there is a treasure map. So he and his friends follow the map to find what the treasure may be.
"The Black Cat Disappears"	Britt Allcroft and Jill Golick	August 26, 1998
The Black Cat is having trouble with her magic: she is changing color, as well as the things around her! The friends discover this is because the Queen of Light is not feeling well. Note: First appearance of The Queen of Light.
"Things That Go Bump"	Britt Allcroft and John Laurence Collins	August 27, 1998
After the raven Napoleon tells them some scary stories, Mumfie, Scarecrow and Pinkey start to believe they have a ghost in the cellar. Note: First appearance of Mole.
"A Grouper's Tooth"	Britt Allcroft and Steve Wright	August 27, 1998
A grumpy grouper has been scaring other fish in the sea because he lost his dentures. Mumfie and Scarecrow try to help him find them.
"The Lost Cloud"	Britt Allcroft and Jill Golick	September 8, 1998
Mumfie and Scarecrow are waiting for rain to come to water their garden when they come across a cloud who wants to find its mother. With the help of the Queen of Night's magical umbrella, they fly through the countryside to find her.
"The Guest"	Britt Allcroft and Jill Golick	September 7, 1998
Mrs. Admiral comes to visit Scarecrow and Mumfie. They soon find out that you don't always know someone until you live with them!
"Scarecrow's Birthday Surprise"	Britt Allcroft and John Laurence Collins	August 25, 1998
Scarecrow is sad because Mumfie doesn't seem to have time for him. But what he doesn't know is that Mumfie is extra busy - planning a surprise party for Scarecrow! Note: First appearance of the forest animals.
"Scarecrow's New Best Friend"	Britt Allcroft and John Laurence Collins	August 26, 1998
After he befriends a lost goose, Scarecrow feels happy...but how will he feel when the goose leaves to join his flock?
"Mumfie and the Wellwisher"	Britt Allcroft and John Laurence Collins	August 24, 1998
Mumfie falls down a wishing well and finds a sick Wellwisher who is sad as he does not receive thank-yous for wishes. They teach each other the unselfishness of giving and the importance of thank-yous!
"Napoleon Moves In"	Britt Allcroft and Steve Wright	August 24, 1998
Napoleon the raven stays with Mumfie while his room at the palace is redecorated. He tells his friends of a raven he used to know called Fifi who he misses but with whom he is reunited thanks to his friends!
"Days Without Night"	Britt Allcroft and John Laurence Collins	August 28, 1998
Pinkey wishes for the daytime to never end because she loves playing so much! The Queen of Night grants her wish, but Pinkey soon finds why night is as important as day. Note: First appearance of Pinkey's butterfly friend. The Queen of Night does not speak in this episode.
"If The Hat Fits"	Britt Allcroft and John Kane	August 28, 1998
Scarecrow loses his beloved hat in a wayward breeze. Mumfie invites some of his friends over to try to find a replacement for his hat.
"The Bird House"	Britt Allcroft and John Kane	August 31, 1998
Mumfie wants to build a new home for a bird who has lost its nest in a storm. All of his friends have many suggestions and cannot agree on a single one.
"Making A Stand"	Britt Allcroft and John Kane	August 31, 1998
Mumfie thinks being a scarecrow is easy - until he's asked to do it and learns how hard his friend Scarecrow really works.
"Bristle's Holiday"	Britt Allcroft and Steve Wright	September 1, 1998
Bristle visits Mumfie and Scarecrow when the Queen of Night suggests he has a holiday to have fun. Bristle has to learn to have fun as he is not used to it, but he soon discovers people can find different things fun.
"Bring The Mountain To Whale"	Britt Allcroft and John Laurence Collins	September 1, 1998
When he and Scarecrow are bored and have nothing to do, they go to the ocean to help make their friend Whale happy. Note: First appearance of Sherman the Oceanologist.
"The Whole Tooth"	Britt Allcroft and John Kane	September 2, 1998
Davy Jones wants to show off his paintings to Mumfie and friends, but is interrupted by Whale when he has a toothache. Mumfie teaches him how to brush his teeth. Note: Scarecrow has fewer lines than usual in this episode.
"A Fishy Tale"	Britt Allcroft and John Kane	September 2, 1998
Mumfie wins a fish at a carnival, but it doesn't seem happy living with Mumfie. Mumfie sets out to find a perfect home for the fish.
"A Day At The Seaside"	Britt Allcroft and Steve Wright	September 3, 1998
After hearing Napoleon's tales of winning the Wingate Olympics for sandcastle building, Mumfie, Scarecrow and Pinkey set out to the beach to build their own sandcastle.
"The Perils Of Pearl"	Britt Allcroft and John Laurence Collins	September 3, 1998
Eel doesn't feel like herself after failing a test at school. Meanwhile, the lighthouse keeper has been trapped by his cousins. Note: This is the only episode to not feature any of the main three characters.
"A Foggy Day"	Britt Allcroft and John Kane	September 4, 1998
Pinkey stays with her friends Mumfie and Scarecrow. It is misty when she leaves and her friends decide to keep her company on the way home. They are scared when they hear strange noises in the mist.
"Reindeers Keep Dropping On My Head"	Britt Allcroft and John Kane	September 4, 1998
You-Are the reindeer is unhappy because he only works on Christmas Eve, and tries to finds other jobs.
"When You Wish Upon A Tree"	Britt Allcroft and John Kane	September 7, 1998
A plum tree that The Queen of Night gives them as a present teaches Mumfie, Scarecrow and Pinkey that friendship is a living thing that grows slowly and needs lots of patience.
"An Age Old Problem"	Britt Allcroft and Steve Wright	September 7, 1998
When Napoleon Jones has a reunion with his flying squadron, he feels old and tries to make himself look younger.
"Davy Jones' Story"	Britt Allcroft and Jill Golick	September 8, 1998
Scarecrow feels not like himself, and so does Davy Jones. A visit to the sea helps the both of them feel better.
"Let's Go Fly A Kite"	Britt Allcroft and John Kane	September 8, 1998
On a windy day, Mumfie and Scarecrow decide to make a kite.
"As Pretty As A Picture"	John Kane and John Laurence Collins	September 9, 1998
Mumfie, Scarecrow and Pinkey find a magic painting of snow in the Queen of Night's palace.

=== Season 3 (1998) ===
Note: All episodes in the season were animated by D'Ocon Films Productions. James L. Miko served as director for this season instead of John Laurence Collins.

Title	Written by	Original release date
"The Goose and I"	John Laurence Collins	September 9, 1998
While Mumfie and Scarecrow are out, Pinkey makes herself at home, along with an unexpected guest-Scarecrow's old friend Goose, who seems to be very rude! Note: The last appearance of Goose. Mumfie and Scarecrow have fewer speaking lines than usual in this episode.
"Fifi Takes a Vacation"	Jill Golick	September 10, 1998
When their friends Napoleon and Fifi go on vacation, Mumfie and Scarecrow volunteer to watch Fifi's cafe - with hilarious and messy results!
"Mind Over Manners"	Steve Wright	September 10, 1998
After Mole says he is having his tea party in Mumfie's cottage, the friends ask Bristle to help them with their table manners. But he is not as helpful as they hoped.
"Bristle's Blues"	Anthony Guadagno	September 11, 1998
Bristle is worried when he loses his book of rules. Mumfie suggest he gets one rule from everyone he meets and makes a new book. Note: Mumfie and Pinkey have fewer speaking lines than usual in this episode. Scarecrow does not appear in this episode.
"The Case of the Missing Sand"	Steve Wright	September 11, 1998
Sterling the Oceanologist invites Mumfie and Scarecrow to help him solve the mystery of some missing sand. Note: Last appearance of Sterling.
"Reigning Cats and Dogs"	John Laurence Collins	September 14, 1998
Whilst doing spring cleaning, Mumfie finds a dog and wants to keep it as a pet. Meanwhile, The Black Cat asks Mumfie and Scarecrow to babysit her niece. Note: First appearance of The Black Cat's niece.
"Pinkey's First Winter"	John Slama	September 14, 1998
Pinkey thinks that Mumfie and Scarecrow have been frozen solid and tries to help them.
"Friends Come First"	Kate Barris	September 15, 1998
Mumfie needs to fix the hole in his cottage roof, but he wants to keep promises he has made to help his friends first.
"Pinkey's Garden"	Jill Golick	September 15, 1998
Pinkey want to give her mother a garden of flowers for Mother's Day.
"If Wishes Were Pancakes"	Steve Wright	September 16, 1998
How many mashed-banana pancakes can a little elephant eat? Mumfie finds out when the Wellwisher grants his wish.
"Mumfie Can't Say No"	Jill Golick	September 16, 1998
The pirates invite themselves to stay with Mumfie and he cannot say no, even though they are terrible house guests!
"Luck or No Luck"	Annie Szamosi	September 17, 1998
Mumfie loses his lucky penny and has a run of bad luck. He is scared to enter an ice skating competition because of it.
"All Work and No Play"	Steve Wright	September 17, 1998
Mumfie feels left out when Scarecrow has work on a farm. He visits his other friends to cheer himself up and helps them with odd jobs. Note: This is the only episode besides "Foe Or Friend?" to use a different arrangement of the cut song "I Must Have My Night" as background music, which is played when Mumfie tries to entertain himself when Scarecrow goes out.
"Up, Up and Away"	Hugh Nielson	September 18, 1998
On their way to help Napoleon with a mystery, Mumfie, Scarecrow and Pinkey find a hot air balloon.
"A Royal Mis-understanding"	James R. Backshall	September 18, 1998
Mumfie and friends want to be suitable suitors for The Queen of Night, but is that what she really wants?
"Cabin Fever"	Steve Wright	September 21, 1998
Scarecrow and Mumfie have fun using magic.
"Mumfie's Lost Button"	John Laurence Collins	September 21, 1998
Mumfie has too many mashed banana pancakes for supper and dreams that he loses a button from his jacket.
"The Island of Lost Things"	James R. Backshall	September 22, 1998
Pinkey and Smidgen the Pigeon are playing tag and lose Smidgen's mail bag. Mumfie and Scarecrow help them to find it on the Island of Lost Things.
"The Abominable Pinkey"	John Laurence Collins	September 22, 1998
Pinkey tells her friends about an Abominable Snowman. They think she is silly until they are shocked to see giant footprints in the snow.
"The Sock Snatchers"	Kate Barris	September 23, 1998
Scarecrow's sock and Mumfie's jacket go missing from their clothesline.
"Small For A Day"	Steve Wright	September 23, 1998
Whale is feeling sad to be big, so his friends take him to the Wellwisher to make a wish to be small for a day. He becomes a minnow and Mumfie keeps him in a jar to see the world.
"Sunrise, Sunset"	James R. Backshall	September 24, 1998
The Queen of Light's master painter, Vincent Van Brushes, has disappeared and left no one to paint the sunrises and sunsets. The friends all try to help, even Davy Jones who thinks his paintings are the best.
"The Album"	John Laurence Collins	September 24, 1998
Scarecrow is feeling a bit claustrophobic after being indoors for three days because of rain. Mumfie and Pinkey try to cheer him up and they do when Mumfie finds a picture album of all the adventures and good times they have had together so far. Note: This episode reveals that the episodes originally aired out of order when they first ran on Fox Family and Nick Jr.
"Time Waits For No Mumfie"	John Laurence Collins	September 25, 1998
Mumfie and friends are playing hide and seek in the Queen of Night's palace. Mumfie finds a room to hide in with a huge clock that keeps the time of the world. Bristle has said he would like more time in the day to get his work done. Mumfie slows the clock down but it jams and they all freeze in time! They have to fix it to help time move normally again.
"Upside Down Magic"	Kate Barris	September 25, 1998
After Pinkey scares him in the garden, Mumfie rips his pants in the bushes and has to find a patch to mend it. But the one he wants does the opposite of what he wishes. Will Mumfie find out why this is happening?
"The Star Attraction"	John Laurence Collins	September 28, 1998
Pinkey meets a magician called The Great Marvellini who convinces her to join a circus because she is a flying pig.
"The Starduster"	John Kane	September 28, 1998
The Queen is worried because the stars have grown dim. Mumfie and friends find a Starduster who has not been cleaning them because of an allergy.
"Orders Are Orders"	Jill Golick	September 29, 1998
Bristle goes overboard with rules when the Queen of Night leaves him in charge of the palace.
"The Jingle Bell"	Steve Wright	September 29, 1998
You-Are has to look after the magic bell from Santa's sleigh while it is in repair.
"It Won't Be Alright On The Night"	John Kane	September 30, 1998
It is the Queen of Night's birthday and her friends plan a show, but a tiny gooseberry imp run-ins the performance.
"Scarecrowella"	Kate Barris	September 30, 1998
After he reads Cinderella, Scarecrow has a dream that he has a fairy Eel godmother who dresses him as a prince for a ball at the Queen of Night's palace! Scarecrow has his own Scarecrowella story!
"Once And Future Mumfie"	Annie Szamosi	October 1, 1998
Mumfie, Scarecrow and Pinkey get lost on their way to the cottage. They find a signpost that shows 'past' 'present' and 'future'.
"Pop Goes The Weasel"	Michael Pezzack	October 1, 1998
Someone has been stealing from Mumfie's and Scarecrow's garden. They make a trap with chocolate cake to find out who it is.
"The Amazing Scarecrow"	James R. Backshall	October 2, 1998
Scarecrow is worried he is boring and Pinkey suggest he might find excitement if he had a job in a circus.
"French Lessons"	John Laurence Collins	October 2, 1998
In exchange for having a party for his friend Fifi, Napoleon teaches his friends how to speak French.
"Aiming For The Moon"	Steve Wright	October 5, 1998
The Lighthouse Keeper wishes to go to the Moon, and thanks to a scientist he runs into, turns his house into a rocket. But will it succeed?
"The Music Of Spring"	Annie Szamosi	October 5, 1998
A deer whose music can melt the snow on the first day of spring loses her flute. Mumfie, Scarecrow and Pinkey set off to find it.
"Lighter Than Air"	Terry Saltsman	October 6, 1998
Bristle and Mr. Admiral want to lose weight. Bristle finds a magic potion which causes anything to eat to make you lighter, but it actually makes you float, not lose weight! Will everyone be able to get on the ground again?
"Flying Fever"	Jill Golick	October 6, 1998
The Admirals want to play golf with Mumfie and Scarecrow, unaware that Napoleon and Fifi are going to visit and get hurt by the game.

== Prospective reboot ==
In May 2014, Britt Allcroft started production on a new season of Mumfie. On July 2, 2015, it was revealed that the kids' division of Zodiak Entertainment, which was behind shows such as Zack & Quack and Totally Spies!, had begun development of the show. In 2022, it was announced that the series had been pre-sold to many networks overseas.
