= Bamboo Bears =

Children's animated television series

- German: Die Bambus-Bären-Bande
- French: Bambou et Compagnie
- Spanish: Los osos del bambú
- Created by: Sicco Kingma
- Directed by: Bernard Deyries; Christian Choquet
- Theme music composer: Nena and Sebastian Krumbiegel
- Opening theme: "Das Lied dieser Welt"
- Ending theme: "Freunde"
- Composer: Axel Kroell
- Countries of origin: Netherlands; Japan; Germany; France; Spain
- Original language: Dutch
- No. of episodes: 52

Production
- Running time: 25 minutes
- Production companies: Kingma Productions; Mitsui & Co.; ZDF; TF1; 4D / Marina Productions; Televisión Española

Original release
- Network: TF1
- Release: 1995 – 1996

Bamboo Bears (Die Bambus-Bären-Bande in German, Bambou et Compagnie in French, and Los osos del bambú in Spanish, バンブーベアーズベアーズ in Japanese) is a children's animated television series. It was produced by Dutch company Kingma Productions, in co-production with Mitsui & Co., ZDF, TF1, 4D / Marina Productions, and Televisión Española. It was first broadcast in 1995. The series production was supported by World Wildlife Fund.

Each episode is dedicated to one animal species. Most of the species are either endangered or their habitat is suffering from human activity. Some of the animals featured in the series are already extinct.

The series aims to make children interested in nature and animals. It teaches viewers about human activity, environmental problems and wildlife conservation.

== Characters ==
Although all animals in the series are capable of speaking the main casts and antagonists are more anthropomorphized (wearing clothes, walking upright) than the animals they help. The human-like characters are contrasted by the local animals they encounter, which seem to be normal animals behaving and moving more like their real-life counterparts.

=== Main cast ===
- Bamboo-Lee is a red panda and the boss of the pack.
- Dah-Lin is a bamboo rat and smallest of the four.
- Sio-Lee is a giant panda and the only true bear of the cast. He is gluttonous.
- Ai-Ai is a pink dragon and the biggest of the cast. Ai-Ai can fly (often having some trouble with landing) and acts as the group's vehicle. She has a backpack-computer the group can use to contact her master, No-How.

=== Supporting cast ===
- No-How, a researcher who provides information and support to the group. He usually sends the gang on a mission to find a certain animal. In the first episode he gives Bamboo-Lee a magical bamboo stick that can be used to summon Ai-Ai.

The main antagonists are RATCO, a greedy corporation that is responsible for most of the destruction in the series, either by poaching animals or exploiting their habitat. As the name suggests the company mostly consists of rats or other rodents. The corporation seems to dabble in all kinds of business ventures, from construction and oil to fashion and entertainment.

- Rataleone. Ruthless businessman and president of RATCO corporation. His true identity is unknown until the end of the series, his face and upper body always obstructed by cigarette smoke, blueprints, lighting, back view, etc.
- Rats One, Two and Three. The RATCO employees don't seem to have names, instead being referred by numbers. One, Two and Three are the main group's most common adversary, always showing up to cause trouble on their boss' orders.
- Rat One is the leader of the group. He is always giving the others orders, blaming them for everything and trying to get on his boss' good side.
- Rat Two is dim-witted and quite passive in his demeanor.
- Rat Three is equally dumb, but has more of a sarcastic attitude.

== Episodes ==
The series consists of 52 episodes aired between 1995 and 1996. Each episode focuses on one endangered animal species, but many feature other animals from the same region.

| No. | Name | Written by | Originally aired | Short summary |
|---|---|---|---|---|
| 01 | Bamboo Bears | Jonathan Peel Michael Stuart Dennis Livson | Oct 7, 1995 | The bamboo forest is dying. Young red panda Bamboo-Lee is sent to find a new home, but this plan quickly goes awry when he meets bamboo rat Dah-Lin, giant panda Slo-Lee and dragon Ai-Ai. He and his new friends start their mission to travel around the globe protecting endangered wildlife with the guidance of No-How. |
| 02 | Brown Bears | A. Kempton | Oct 14, 1995 | The group travels to Pyrenees Mountain Range in Europe to find brown bears. Ratco is trying to blast a tunnel through mountain to win a contract to build a new highway. |
| 03 | Blue Parrot | Lucy Daniel-Raby | Oct 21, 1995 | Parrots have become a fashion accessory. The group finds a caged hyacinth macaw for sale in a city and decide to take him home to Amazon rainforest. |
| 04 | Sea Otter | J. Hibbert | Oct 28, 1995 | Oil transportation on America's West Coast threatens sea otters and the abalones they feed on. |
| 05 | Cuban Solenodon | J. Trueman | Nov 4, 1995 | The gang crash lands to Cuba. There they find a friendly almiquí who tells them RATCO is destroying jungle to make room for sugarcane farms. |
| 06 | American Manatee | R. Stennet | Nov 11, 1995 | Rats One, Two and Three are causing trouble, this time by reckless boating. Upcoming motor boat race arranged by RATCO is threatening peace and manatees in the Florida coast. |
| 07 | African Wild Ass | C. Cuenca | Nov 18, 1995 | RATCO has set up a ranch. They are capturing wild donkeys to use them as labor. |
| 08 | Giant Anteater | J. Hibbert | Nov 25, 1995 | RATCO is building a leisure complex. To provide electricity they plan to cut down the forest and build a dam that will flood the valley where giant anteaters live. |
| 09 | American Beaver | J. Hibbert | Dec 2, 1995 | The Bamboo Bears travel to Canada. RATCO has built a paper mill on the shore of Night Hawk Lake and is dumping arsenic into the water, poisoning local beaver population. The episode mentions both Lake Erie and Night Hawk Lake. Whether this is a coincidence or the real Night Hawk Lake in Ontario is not clear. |
| 10 | Galapagos Iguana | P. Palmer | Dec 9, 1995 | No-How sends the gang to Galápagos Islands to observe their unique eco system. Meanwhile rats One, Two and Three come there to capture an iguana for Rataleone's theme park. |
| 11 | Brown Howler | I. Aymes P. Symonds | Dec 16, 1995 | The gang is in Brazil enjoying the carnival when Slo-Lee spots Brown Howler Opera Company, an opera group he is a fan of. Rataleone wants to buy their opera house to continue construction for a dam he is building. Interestingly, out of all the animals the gang helps, the brown howler is the only species anthropomorphized like they are. They wear clothing, have human-like proportions and operate an opera house. |
| 12 | Prairie Dogs | J. Trueman | Dec 23, 1995 | RATCO is drilling oil on the Texas prairie. Instead of disposing of the waste oil properly they pump the dirty oil into underground cavities. This is poisoning the prairie dog burrows and the roots they eat. |
| 13 | Humpback Whale | J. Boyle | Dec 30, 1995 | RATCO has expanded its business ventures to the illegal activity of whaling near the coast of Hawaii. The gang helps a humpback whale and her calf fight back. |
| 14 | Quetzal | Lucy Daniel-Raby | Jan 6, 1996 | No-How's sister Ting-a-Ling comes to visit, only to tell her husband, a famous explorer has gone missing in the jungles of South-America, somewhere between Guatemala and Mexico. Turns out he was kidnapped by RATCO who are cutting down the forest to obtain exotic timber for furniture. Quetzals are a group of birds. The episode is most likely referring to Resplendent quetzal that can be found in Southern Mexico and Guatemala. |
| 15 | Snow Leopard | Jonathan Peel | Jan 13, 1996 | The gang travels to the Nepal mountains to find a snow leopard. Apparently they are not the only ones, because they're being followed. Rats One, Two and Three are going to poach an adult snow leopard for its pelt and capture its cub so they can sell it to a zoo. |
| 16 | Arabian Oryx | F. Boublil | Jan 20, 1996 | Rats One, Two and Three are tasked to steal a sick Arabian oryx from a zoo. Rataleone wants to secure drilling rights to a recently found oil deposit located in a protected area, and his plan is to return the sick individual into the wild where it can infect other oryxes with unnamed disease. |
| 17 | Peregrine Falcon | R. Stennet | Jan 27, 1996 | The gang travels to Rocky Mountains and finds a family of peregrine falcons. The falcon family quickly becomes under threat as RATCO's new fruit orchids are using pesticides that will kill the falcon's food and poison their eggs. Out of all the animals helped in the series the peregrine falcon is the only one who doesn't speak. |
| 18 | Philippine Tarsier | F. Giraud | Feb 3, 1996 | RATCO is cutting down forests in the Philippines. Not only does Rataleone want the forest cleared out to build a hotel complex on the island, he wants to collect native species to display in his "nature preserve". The gang helps a family of Philippine tarsiers to rescue their child and put an end to the hotel plans. |
| 19 | Pardel Lynx | I. Aymes P. Symonds | Feb 10, 1996 | Rataleone is not happy with faux fur and wants to add authentic furs to his fashion collection. The gang must travel to Spain to rescuen an Iberian lynx and her cubs. For unknown reason the lynx cubs are sometimes animated walking on two legs, while their mother is animated as a normal feline. |
| 20 | Adelie Penguin | M. Locatelli | Feb 17, 1996 | RATCO is illegally pumping oil in the antarctic. Their equipment is poorly maintained and the pipeline is leaking, pouring oil into water and threatening Adélie penguins and the fish they feed on. |
| 21 | Andes Condor | A. Kempton | Feb 24, 1996 | Rataleone is backing up a drug cartel in the Andes, forcing locals to either work for them or leave. Local people's hatred and increased cartel activity have made life harder for Andean condors. The episode not only references hard drugs, it also explains why people use them, why they don't stop even if they know it's bad for them and why many have no choice but to work for the cartel. |
| 22 | Giant Squid | S. Knight | Mar 2, 1996 | As our group is flying over the ocean they see a rundown ship dumping waste - and an angry giant squid taking matters into his own tentacles. The gang helps the squid and other sea creatures to stop RATCO's illegal dumping of oil waste. Giant squid was known to science from stranded specimen, but the first photos and recordings of a living squid were taken only after the series was completed. |
| 23 | Common Frog | C. Cuenca | Mar 9, 1996 | RATCO is turning a pond into scrap metal dump. This habitat destruction is especially harmful to local frog population. |
| 24 | Arctic Fox | J. Boyle | Mar 16, 1996 | The gang is vacationing in the arctic and finds a destroyed animal nest and a secretive base. Traffic and construction has disturbed local wildlife and destroyed arctic fox family's den. The facade of a heater factory soon reveals RATCO's high-tech laboratory. |
| 25 | Javan Tiger | C. Carr | Mar 23, 1996 | Vacation in Java turns into expedition for rumored Javan tiger. Meanwhile RATCO is cutting down the forest to build a hotel and mall complex and trying to turn locals against the tigers by framing them for killing cattle. Javan tiger is one of the species that has become extinct since the shows concluded. It has not been seen since 1976, but the rumours of surviving individuals persisted until the 90s. |
| 26 | Polar Bear | J. Trueman | Mar 30, 1996 | RATCO is dumping their unsold cooler units into an ice cave in Greenland. Their freon gases are depleting the ozone layers, which is bad news for polar bears and other animals dependant on ice. |
| 27 | Tasmanian Wolf | M. Kiritze | Apr 6, 1996 | The gang travels to Australia when sightings of the extinct Tasmanian wolf are reported. Rataleone wants to capture the thylacine both for the cash reward and to put it in a zoo. Last known thylacine died in captivity in 1936 and the species was declared extinct in 1982, long before the show's creation. Interestingly the sheepdog and goat featured in the episode seem to be a normal animals that can't speak. |
| 28 | Malaysian Tapir | J. Boyle | Apr 13, 1996 | RATCO is cutting down forests in Malaysia. Ai-Ai gets hurt while trying to rescue a baby Malayan tapir from the logging machines. |
| 29 | Japanese Macaque | Jonathan Peel Michael Stuart | Apr 20, 1996 | Rats One, Two and Three want to get rid of the Japanese macaques to build a luxury resort near their hot springs to please their boss. |
| 30 | The Grey Wolf | P. Palmer | Apr 27, 1996 | The gang is horse-backing in North American wilderness, enjoying the sights. Rataleone wants to open a copper mine on grey wolf habitat and plans to use local superstition and fear to drive the wolves away. |
| 31 | Smalltooth Sawfish | M. de Jardin | May 4, 1996 | RATCO is destroying coral reef to make way for an underwater complex. The gang teams up with local tribes and a pair of smalltooth sawfish to prevent the construction project. The episode mentions they are on an island somewhere on the Pacific ocean. Smalltooth sawfish only live in the Atlantic Ocean. It is possible that the location mentioned is wrong or the episode might be talking about largetooth sawfish. |
| 32 | Russian Desman | F. Boublil | May 11, 1996 | Rataleone is making business by dumping nuclear waste into a lake in Siberia. The radioactive material is harming local wildlife, including Russian desmans. On top of the environmental disaster a crazy Russian scientist is using the radiation for his experiments. In the episode a researcher is observing the radiation levels, equating them to real-life event of Chernobyl nuclear disaster. |
| 33 | African Elephant | B. Duquesne | May 18, 1996 | Rataleone has found a new business venture in dealing ivory. To harvest ivory from African elephants RATCO goons are using tsetse flies and the sleeping sickness they spread to stun the elephants. |
| 34 | Burrowing Bettong | J. Hibbert | May 25, 1996 | Rataleone wants to expand his sheep farm by burning down the Australian bushland. The Bamboo Bears must stop them and help protect the burrowing bettongs that live in the area. |
| 35 | Nile Crocodile | M. Seck | Jun 1, 1996 | RATCO is partaking in the lucrative business of crocodile skin fashion accessories. The gang helps Nile crocodiles find their brother and stop poachers from hunting crocodiles. Episode shows game keepers and other officials as corrupt people willing to take bribes - but also explains why this is so common in poor countries and how many do it out of necessity. |
| 36 | The Black Stork | J. P. Henry | Jun 8, 1996 | RATCO is constructing a holiday resort in an area dedicated as wildlife sanctuary. To save the nesting site of a black stork family the gang must try to play politics and convince the minister of environment to stop the project. |
| 37 | Mountain Gorilla | J. Boyle | Jun 15, 1996 | Mountain gorillas are threatened by hungry local villagers who are both trapping them for meat and expanding their farmland. RATCO is not helping the matters. They're trying to convince locals to cultivate a plant that is not edible but used as insecticide instead to rake in the profits. |
| 38 | Mouse-eared Bat | I. Neyret | Jun 22, 1996 | Rataleone has acquired a genuine haunted English Castle, and considers the bats who live there to be an expendable nuisance. Ai-Ai and Our heroes save the Bat colony and give the Rats a serious scare. |
| 39 | Vicunas | F. Boublil | Jun 29, 1996 | On a quest to find the only surviving male dragon in the world to cure Ai-Ai's depression, the Bamboo Bears also stop RATCO along the way who is rounding up rare Peruvian Vicunas for the Bezoar stone, which is said to enhance immortality. |
| 40 | Orang Utan | J. Hibbert | Jul 6, 1996 | Rataleone can make a fortune from poaching orangutans from the wild and selling them to cosmetics companies and for medical research. No-How sends the Bamboo Bears on a mercy mission to put a stop to this dreadful trade before the Orangutans disappear in the name of greed and vanity! |
| 41 | Przewalski's Horse | Lucy Daniel-Raby | Jul 13, 1996 | Rataleone is building a new superhighway across Siberia and straight through the Gobai National Park, home of the Przewalski's Wild horse. Thanks to Slo-Lee’s striking resemblance to Kublai Khan, the Bamboo Bears manage to persuade the herdsmen to rescue the horses and stop construction. |
| 42 | Capybara | A. Kempton | Jul 20, 1996 | Mercury poisoning from Ratco gold mines in Brazil has been polluting the river habitat of the Capybaras. Sent on a mercy mission by No-How, Our heroes succeed in closing down the mine and saving the Capybara’s environment. |
| 43 | Green Turtle | A. Kempton | Jul 27, 1996 | Thomas and Toba are Turtles who have no known enemies. All sea creatures are their friends, even the evil-tempered Shark, Sam. Rataleone’s Fish Farm project however poses a serious threat to their lives. Bamboo-Lee has to become a temporary undercover agent in order to save them. |
| 44 | Black-headed Uakari | I. Aymes, P. Symonds | Aug 3, 1996 | Rataleone is destroying the Brazilian rainforest to open up a new cattle ranch, putting the Neblina uakaris under threat. The Bamboo Bears save one of the Uakaris, Winston from the illegal pet trade and shut down the grand opening celebration to save the forests. This episode covers the topic of Amazon deforestation to clear the way for cattle ranching, which is one of the many relevant issues when it comes to environmentalism. |
| 45 | Alpine Woodschuck | A. Kempton | Aug 10, 1996 | The Bamboo Bears set off on a new adventure to the Alps in celebration of Ai-Ai's Birthday to visit an old friend, Medric the Mountain Troll. They also learn about Rataleone's plans to build an Alpine ski resort in the Alpine Marmot's habitat. They discover a secret resource that may save the Marmots and make it into a protected wildlife resort. |
| 46 | White Rhinoceros | M. Locatelli | Aug 17, 1996 | The White rhinos are under threat due to the poaching for their horns, which are said to contain magical healing powers and RATCO goons are hunting as many as they can. Now it is up to the gang to shut down the rhino horn powder for good! In this episode, the species is somewhat irrelevant as the White rhinos resemble more of Black Rhinos. |
| 47 | European Viper | | Aug 24, 1996 | |
| 48 | Common Seal | | Aug 31, 1996 | |
| 49 | Koala Bear | | Sep 7, 1996 | |
| 50 | Edible Nest Swiftlet | | Sep 14, 1996 | |
| 51 | Volcano Rabbit | | Sep 21, 1996 | |
| 52 | White Baiji Dolphin | | Sep 28, 1996 | |

== Fantastical elements ==
The animals and locations the show introduces are real. However Bamboo Bears also feature some fantastical elements by throwing in mythical creatures like dragons, magical items and non-existent technology.

=== Episode 01 - Bamboo Bears ===
Episode one introduces the first mythical creature. Ai-Ai is a large, pink dragon and is seen in almost all episodes.

=== Episode 06 - American Manatee ===
The group uses the legend of Bermuda Triangle and sea monsters to scare away RATCO. In the final shot of the episode we see monstrous eye open in a dark ocean cave.

=== Episode 24 - Arctic fox ===
The episode features a futuristic machine able to manipulate time. Time travel is an essential part of the episode's plot.

=== Episode 29 - Japanese Macaque ===
To scare away the monkeys rats use a mechanical monster, visually similar to Bigfoot with a Japanese-style mask. No-How tells the gang about a Japanese legend where a boy beats a mountain monster with the help of a basket of dumplings, a dog, a monkey and a pheasant. This is most likely a reference to the folktale of Momotarō.
