= Angus Wright (producer) =

British television producer (1934–2012)

- Born: Angus Mackenzie Nicholson Wright; 11 April 1934; Sunderland, County Durham, England
- Died: 15 June 2012 (aged 78); France
- Occupation: Television producer
- Years active: 1970s–1997
- Spouses: Jill Graham (divorced); Britt Allcroft (m. 1973; div. 1997); Sue Sangway (m. 2001)
- Children: 5

Angus Mackenzie Nicholson Wright (11 April 1934 – 15 June 2012) was a British television producer; he was co-founder and managing director of The Britt Allcroft Company PLC until his retirement in 1997.

== Early life ==
Wright was born on 11 April 1934 in Sunderland, County Durham. His father was an Anglican vicar and his mother worked as a nurse and a school matron during her life as well as being an active member of the church and a Samaritan. Angus was the eldest of two children - his sister was Alison.

Educated at Durham School, he served two years of national service in the Durham Light Infantry. He went to university at Trinity College, Oxford to read law from 1954 to 1957, where he met his first wife Jill Graham, with whom he had his first three of five children.

== At the BBC ==
Though being of an accomplished legal mind, his interest was drawn to theatre and the performing Arts. Both he and Jill were members of The Oxford Footlights which had fellow members of the time; Peter Cook, Dudley Moore and Alan Bennett. Jill Graham continued acting as her career as did their eldest son. Angus was a talented pianist and this was his main contribution to the Footlights.

Having had his interest in performing arts sparked, after graduation he joined the BBC as a sound studio manager, moving to BBC Television, Light Entertainment and then to Southern Television (Southern T.V.), the commercial television franchise for the south and south east of England. He and Jill moved to the Southern T.V. based in Southampton and after their marriage ended, he remained in Southampton where he then shared a home with his second wife, Britt Allcroft with whom he had two children, from 1973 until the end of their marriage in 1997.

At Southern Television, he was a prominent member of staff in children's television. He had now become a producer and director of programmes in Jack Hargreaves’ children's television department. He was responsible for one of ITV's longest-running children's favourites How as well as Little Big Time and Oliver in the Overworld starring Freddy Garrity and the Dreamers. He also created the popular Houseparty for light entertainment with celebrity cook Mary Morris and guests.

With the change of the Southern TV franchise he stayed on at Southampton, becoming Head of Religious programmes, first for TV South and then for Meridian Television. He was producer and occasional director for the weekly Sunday evening programme Come Sunday. Through this he had opportunities in programmes to work with the then Archbishop of Canterbury, Robert Runcie, activist Terry Waite, and Archbishop Desmond Tutu, which he appreciated greatly, since having a huge interest in history, religion and politics. It was also during this time that he created two television specials in partnership with Winchester Cathedral where worked with Choir Director Martin Neary and the Bishop John Taylor, with whom he became good friends. A highlight of his career was the show produced at Winchester, which included performances by Cleo Laine and John Dankworth.

== The Britt Allcroft Company ==
In 1985, he resigned from network television to join an independent production company, which he had founded in 1980 with his, then wife, Britt Allcroft, also a working and accomplished television producer. In the course of a freelance assignment, Allcroft met The Reverend Wilbert Awdry and together she and Wright acquired a licence for television rights for Awdry's The Railway Series books featuring Thomas the Tank Engine. David Mitton of Clearwater Features directed scripts which Britt Allcroft had developed from Awdry's stories. Mitton's live model animations which he made with Terence Permane, Steve Asquith and a talented crew, became beloved among children for decades to come. The production team was completed with the now iconic music by Mike O'Donnell and Junior Campbell and first narrator Ringo Starr. Under the cottage industry style company, Angus, Britt and two assistants ran the production and licensing business from rooms in the family home with their business lawyer Nigel Palmer. The business hired two more members of staff before the company moved to its first premises.

With the support of Lewis Rudd, then of Central Television, the first series of Thomas the Tank Engine episodes launched nationally on ITV in the U.K. on 9 October 1984. Licensing already began with Michael Stanfield board games and jigsaws in 1983. Angus Wright had credit as Executive Producer on the series during 1991-1998. The company continued to grow in countries around the world and Wright made frequent trips to countries such as Japan and the U.S where the company would have future offices as well as Toronto, Ontario, Canada.

In 1986, the company was joined by Price Waterhouse accountant William Harris who became Finance Director in 1988, and in 1989 Sue Sangway, who later became Wright's second wife joined the Marketing Department which she then became head of in 1991.

In 1987, work began to bring Thomas the Tank Engine to the U.S.A. where it became established on the US Public Television Network (PBS), home of children's TV classic Sesame Street. The resulting success of the characters enabled them to be established in Japan on Fuji Television. In just over 10 years the Britt Allcroft Company grew from a two-person start-up to a worldwide operation with offices in New York City, Tokyo and Toronto. At the time of its 1996 launch on the London Stock Exchange, it was producing £6.3 million gross profit on annual turnover of £53 million.

Further productions followed: Britt Allcroft's Magic Adventures of Mumfie in 1994; Wright acted as executive producer for Kate Canning's James the Cat and John Carey's production of The Adventures of Captain Pugwash in 1998.

== Retirement ==
In 1997 at the age of 63, Wright retired from the Britt Allcroft Company Limited. Wright and Sue Sangway moved to France in 1998, where they were married in 2001, until he died.

== Death ==
Wright died on 15 June 2012 in France, at the age of 78. He is survived by his wife Sue Sangway.
