= Row Your Boat =

- VHS cover
- Directed by: Sollace Mitchell
- Written by: Sollace Mitchell
- Produced by: Karen Montgomery
- Music by: Mader
- Production companies: Preferred Films; 49th Parallel Productions; Waterstreet Productions
- Distributed by: Gullane Pictures
- Release date: 1998
- Running time: 106 minutes
- Country: United States
- Language: English

Row Your Boat is a 1998 American drama film about a recently released ex-convict trying to correct his life. It was written and directed by Sollace Mitchell and stars Jon Bon Jovi, Bai Ling, and William Forsythe. The title is taken from the English nursery rhyme "Row, Row, Row Your Boat". The film was produced in 1998 and released in 2001 on home video.

== Plot ==
Bon Jovi plays Jamey Meadows, a man newly released from prison who is consequently homeless and living on the streets of New York City. Slowly, he must build his life up from the gutter, and takes a menial job as a door-to-door census taker for the government. His brother Gil, a petty criminal played by William Forsythe (Dick Tracy, The Rock, Deuce Bigalow: Male Gigolo) sees Meadows' employment as a way to gain inside information for future burglaries, and tries to cajole, bribe, and blackmail Meadows into helping the gang. Meadows resists, as it was helping his brother that got him into jail, and loyalty that kept him from implicating the others.

In the course of work he interviews Chun Hua (Bai Ling), an attractive young Chinese woman married to a much older businessman, and has a baby boy from an earlier liaison. Meadows enjoys her companionship and starts an innocent relationship with her, getting paid to teach her colloquial (New York) English, in the course of which they sing together the nursery-rhyme of the title. He pretends his brother's apartment is his own, rather than admit he is "sleeping rough". They begin a chaste love affair, but have aroused suspicions.

At this stage the film has all the elements of a romantic comedy, with many amusing highlights, but then gets darker and more complicated. The gang breaks into the Chinese family residence, find nothing of value, so kidnap the baby for the ransom, not realizing he is precious only to Chun Hua, who is penniless. Meadows abducts the baby and is pursued by the gang, but loses them, stealing a rowboat to cross the Hudson to where Chun Hua is waiting. He is shot by his brother (in the back, as he is protecting the baby) and dies before being picked up by the coastguard. The brother is treated as a hero for foiling the kidnap attempt. Chun Hua and her baby return to China; only she knows the truth.

== Release ==
It was the first feature-length project produced by the newly-formed US division of Gullane Pictures, the motion-picture subsidiary of The Britt Allcroft Company. Catalyst Entertainment, the company's Canadian partner, handled international sales.

== Critical reception ==
The film brought home an Audience Choice Award for Best Feature at the Stony Brook Film Festival in 1999.

== Home media ==
Row Your Boat was released in Australia by Flashback Entertainment (Cat. 9852)
