= Bronies: The Extremely Unexpected Adult Fans of My Little Pony =

- Title card
- Directed by: Laurent Malaquais
- Written by: Nat Segaloff
- Produced by: Anglie Brown; Morgan Peterson
- Cinematography: Laurent Malaquais
- Edited by: Jay Miracle
- Music by: David O. The Living Tombstone; Gabriel Brown (Singer); Nathanael Brown (Producer)
- Production companies: BronyDoc, Inc
- Distributed by: FilmBuff
- Release dates: November 4, 2012 (Anaheim Convention Center); January 19, 2013 (Digital release)
- Running time: 88 minutes
- Country: United States
- Language: English
- Budget: $348,164

Bronies: The Extremely Unexpected Adult Fans of My Little Pony (formerly titled BronyCon: The Documentary) is a 2012 documentary film centering on bronies, the adult fans of the 2010 animated television series My Little Pony: Friendship Is Magic. The film, funded through crowd-sourcing via Kickstarter, was originally envisioned to follow voice actor and executive producer John de Lancie to the 2012 Summer BronyCon in New Jersey. The project raised much more than anticipated, allowing it to grow in scope to bring on Lauren Faust, Friendship Is Magic's original creator, and Tara Strong, a principal voice actress on the show, as executive producers and to include additional convention footage from European conventions.

== Background ==
Hasbro's My Little Pony franchise, started in the 1980s, has had several animated television series and direct-to-video movies to help promote and sell the associated toy line collection; over the years, there have been four "generations" of designs and associated characters and settings. In 2010, Hasbro aimed to relaunch the My Little Pony line, following the success of the re-envisioning of the Transformers franchise, and brought in animator Lauren Faust as the creative developer for the show; in addition to developing the looks and characters to be featured in the toy line, Faust was also tasked with creating a new tie-in show to provide programming for its new cable network, The Hub (jointly owned with the Discovery Channel). Faust's previous experience on shows like The Powerpuff Girls and Foster's Home for Imaginary Friends led to her developing a show that would have cross-generational appeal to young girls and the parents that would watch the show with them. Her characters were designed to challenge the norm of female stereotypes while still keeping the archetypes as familiar figures, and put the pony characters into more adventurous situations than previous My Little Pony works. Faust worked with several former co-writers from her previous shows (including her husband and animator Craig McCracken), and with the directors at DHX Media (formerly Studio B Productions) in Vancouver, British Columbia, where the show would be produced.

The resulting show, My Little Pony: Friendship Is Magic, was well received by parents, but found another unexpected target audience through the Internet image board 4chan amongst males, many of whom are adults. Quickly expanding through the Internet, the fandom came to use the term "brony" (a portmanteau of "bro" and "pony") to describe themselves. The brony fandom is attributed to Faust and her creative team for including strong characters, cross-generational appeal, cultural references, the show's expressive Flash-based animation, and the ability for the showrunners to communicate and reciprocate with the fandom, such as including fan-derived elements within the show. Hasbro was initially caught off-guard by this surprise demographic but have since come to embrace it, leveraging licensing deals to market clothes, media, and other merchandise beyond toys to the older audience.

== Synopsis ==
The documentary is split into numerous sections, primarily featuring the mid-2012 BronyCon, GalaCon, and B.U.C.K. conventions. These portions are bookmarked by several featurettes, including original animations, interviews with the show's creative staff, members of the fandom, and other such facets, and look at the fandom's various effects, including music, art, videos, writing, and gaming. The work in particular provides background and the experiences of a number of fans, explaining their introduction to the fandom, the hardships they have faced by admitting this to others, and their enjoyment of the conventions. Musician Yoav Landau of The Living Tombstone, known for his remixes of the series' songs, appears in the film. In addition to the live footage, the documentary includes original animated interstitials in the style of Friendship Is Magic, featuring songs composed by Arthur Sullivan; arrangement by David O.; lyrics by Amy Keating Rogers, Zachary Lobertini, and Faust; and sung by de Lancie and Strong. In these sequences, de Lancie voices a professor pony giving an illustrated lecture about the fandom's history, subgroups and popular activities, only to be confronted by a group of mares who call him out on his presentation's male orientation at the end.

== Production ==
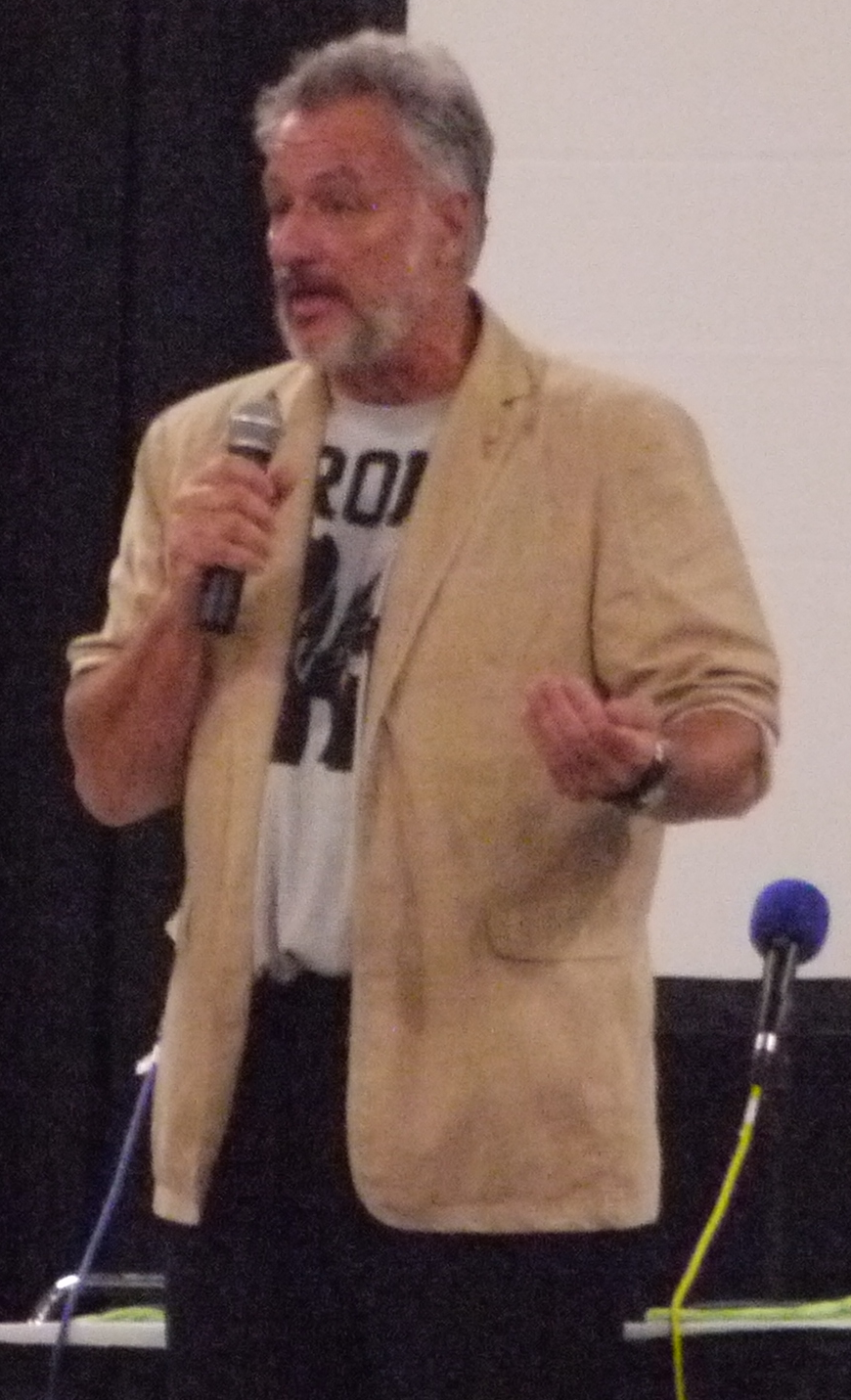
John de Lancie speaking at BronyCon 2012

John de Lancie was a guest voice of the villain character Discord in the second season 2-part premiere, "The Return of Harmony". Faust had written the Discord character as a sendup of de Lancie's Q from Star Trek: The Next Generation, though had not anticipated that he would be the actual voice. When the production team started to look into voice actors for the character, they found that de Lancie was available, and made some alterations in Discord's mannerisms to be even more Q-like. Though at the time de Lancie felt it was just another small role when he recorded the lines, he was overwhelmed in email and other social networking services with positive reactions from the show's fans praising the character after the episode's airing. He began to research the fandom and found that it had many similarities to the early Star Trek fandom, in which most of the original fans were female in contrast to the target male demographic of the show.

de Lancie subsequently worked with producer Michael Brockhoff and director Laurent Malaquais to put together the concept of a documentary about the fandom, as he had previously worked with Brockhoff on other documentary films. de Lancie had spoken to Brockhoff about the response to his role as Discord, and Brockhoff was curious to learn more, de Lancie subsequently further researching the fandom and recognizing the potential of a documentary to cover them. de Lancie stated that he was taken aback by how disrespectfully national news media portrayed the brony fandom, and resolved to do it "the right way". For funding, the group opted to use a Kickstarter campaign, and initially had named the documentary BronyCon: The Documentary. The intent was to use footage taken at the mid-2012 BronyCon convention, held at the Meadowlands Exposition Center in Secaucus, New Jersey, as the basis for the film. de Lancie would narrate as well as be a producer of the work.

The Kickstarter campaign began on May 13, 2012. By May 16, 2012, the project had already surpassed its $60,000 goal. With funding surpassing the initial target amount, it was announced late in May that Tara Strong and Lauren Faust were joining the project as producers. They also announced plans to enlarge the project's budget, hoping to increase the scale and broadness of the documentary, upping the budget to $200,000. This goal was reached on June 4, 2012, and the budget was then increased to $270,000, a goal which was also met. On June 8, 2012, it became the fourth most funded film project on Kickstarter, and it would become the second most funded film on Kickstarter with $322,022 in pledges, not counting the contributions made through PayPal at the end of its run on June 10, 2012.

Because of the additional funding, the producers decided to expand the scope, using the funds to pay for fare to Europe to attend GalaCon and B.U.C.K., two additional brony conventions in mid-2012. To reflect the larger scope of the project beyond the BronyCon convention, it was announced shortly thereafter that the film's name was changed to Bronies: The Extremely Unexpected Adult Fans of My Little Pony. Much of the production was done with the questions "Why are 20-year-old guys watching a cartoon intended for 10-year-old girls? And, why does society have a problem with that?" in mind.

== Distribution ==
An initial edit of the film was shown to a select audience at the Equestria LA convention in Los Angeles in early November 2012. Some final edits incorporating additional convention coverage and fan contributions were done afterwards, prior to the release.

The film was released digitally to those that funded the Kickstarter on January 19, 2013, with home media versions following that February. The producers planned to show the film at various film festivals, including the 2013 Kansas City Film Festival. The United States cable network Logo TV has acquired the rights to broadcast the documentary and first aired it October 14, 2013 as the premiere episode of their WHAT!? Logo Documentary series.

After the digital release of the main documentary to the backers of the Kickstarter campaign, the production team continued to work on additional features that would have been part of a separate media release. In early February 2013, the production team announced that due to high rates of copyright infringement of the digital version within the brony community, they had ceased further work on these features, stating "that investing any more time and energy would be not be worthwhile". Regarding the infringement, De Lancie stated that the creators early on had decided not to take any form of payment for the documentary and were instead using the money toward production, with the expectation of earning money from sales of the work. Unlicensed versions of the film were reportedly on YouTube and other sites within a half-hour of its release to backers, and while de Lancie estimates 4,000 copies were sold digitally, they estimated that more than 10,000 people have seen the film. The decision to discontinue production did not affect their plans to continue to publish the documentary on home media, fulfill the remaining Kickstarter backer rewards, or additional releases at film festivals and streaming services.

The film was released on DVD and Blu-ray, with an option for additional new features, on February 17, 2013. Digital streaming of the film on various services began on September 13, 2013.

== Reception ==
The film received a generally favorable reception from the fandom and a mixed reception from critics, with some feeling the film focused on certain aspects of fandom and ignored other facets, including the lack of criticism of the fandom by others, and the significant portion of female adult fans. Other fans felt that the documentary made the concept of being a brony mean that one had to be "treated like a misunderstood taboo to the rest of the world", and countered that they have openly expressed their appreciation of the show without any backlash from friends and family. Jeneé Osterheldt of The Kansas City Star stated that "the film does its job" in showcasing the stories from the fandom, and that it "makes you think twice before judging a guy by his cutie mark". Mike Sauve of Exclaim! states that film, while showing some of the more touching aspects of the fandom, "plays like an infomercial for [My Little Pony], fawning over its creator and voice talent".

== Follow-up ==
The film was followed by another documentary film, titled Bronies 2: More Unexpected Fans of My Little Pony. It follows Brony Jason Koenig through his day-to-day life, and was initially released split into several parts, which were uploaded to YouTube on the filmmakers' official channel throughout 2014 and early 2015. The entirety of the film was later released on DVD.

== See also ==
- A Brony Tale, a 2014 documentary film
- An Unlikely Fandom, a similar film released in 2023 about the adult fandom of the children's show Thomas & Friends.
