= An Unlikely Fandom =

- Film poster
- Directed by: Brannon Carty
- Produced by: Ahmad Akfa; Brannon Carty; Joshua Hood; Nick Maniscalco
- Cinematography: Brannon Carty
- Edited by: Brannon Carty
- Music by: John Hayes
- Production company: Requiem Pictures
- Release dates: November 27, 2023 (US premiere); August 2, 2025 (UK premiere); January 15, 2026 (Typhoon On Demand)
- Running time: 85 minutes
- Country: United States
- Language: English
- Budget: $20,000

An Unlikely Fandom: The Impact of Thomas the Tank Engine is a 2023 American documentary film centering on the adult fandom of the British children's character Thomas the Tank Engine, who originated in The Railway Series by Wilbert Awdry and his son Christopher. The books were later adapted for television as Thomas & Friends, which subsequently expanded into a broader media franchise. Principal photography began in July 2019 at a fan convention called Shining Time 2019 in Huntingdon, PA. The filmmakers acquired additional funding through a Kickstarter that raised over US$14,500 over the span of 30 days to further expand the scope of the film, as well as allowing the filmmakers to interview people connected to both The Railway Series and Thomas & Friends, including Thomas & Friends creator Britt Allcroft in her final on-screen appearance before her death on December 25, 2024.

The documentary premiered in New York City on November 27, 2023, Derby Litchurch Lane Works in the United Kingdom on August 2, 2025, and released on demand on Typhoon on January 15, 2026. It was then released on the YouTube channel Stash on August 9, 2026.

== Synopsis ==
The documentary takes an intimate look into the adult fandom of The Railway Series and the Thomas & Friends franchise through various fan conventions and personal interviews. Many of those interviewed explain how they learned film-making, or other creative pursuits, through fashioning fan fictions. Around the world and from different walks of life, adult fans reflect on their love for it, and how it has forever changed the course of their lives.

== See also ==
- Bronies: The Extremely Unexpected Adult Fans of My Little Pony, a 2012 documentary film about the adult fandom of My Little Pony: Friendship Is Magic
