= Berliner Film Companie =

Former German film and TV production company

- Type: Film and television production company
- Industry: Film and television
- Founded: 2002
- Defunct: 2011
- Headquarters: Berlin, Germany
- Products: Animated television series and films
- Owner: Dresdner Allianz Group

Berliner Film Companie (BFC) was a German film and television production company owned by Dersdner Allianz Group. Most of its productions were animated series (and two animated feature films) produced through its subsidiary Berlin Animation Film (BAF), originally formed in 1999. BFC went into administration in 2009, and BAF followed in 2015.

== History ==
Berlin Animation Film was founded in 1999 following a decision by Dresdner Bank to invest in television animation. The company's initial goal was to provide animation services for the television series Simsala Grimm, which was already produced by Greenlight AG. In October 2002, BAF and Greenlight parted ways and Dresdner founded Berliner Film Companie. The company had an office at Johannisstraße and had around 100 animators at its peak.

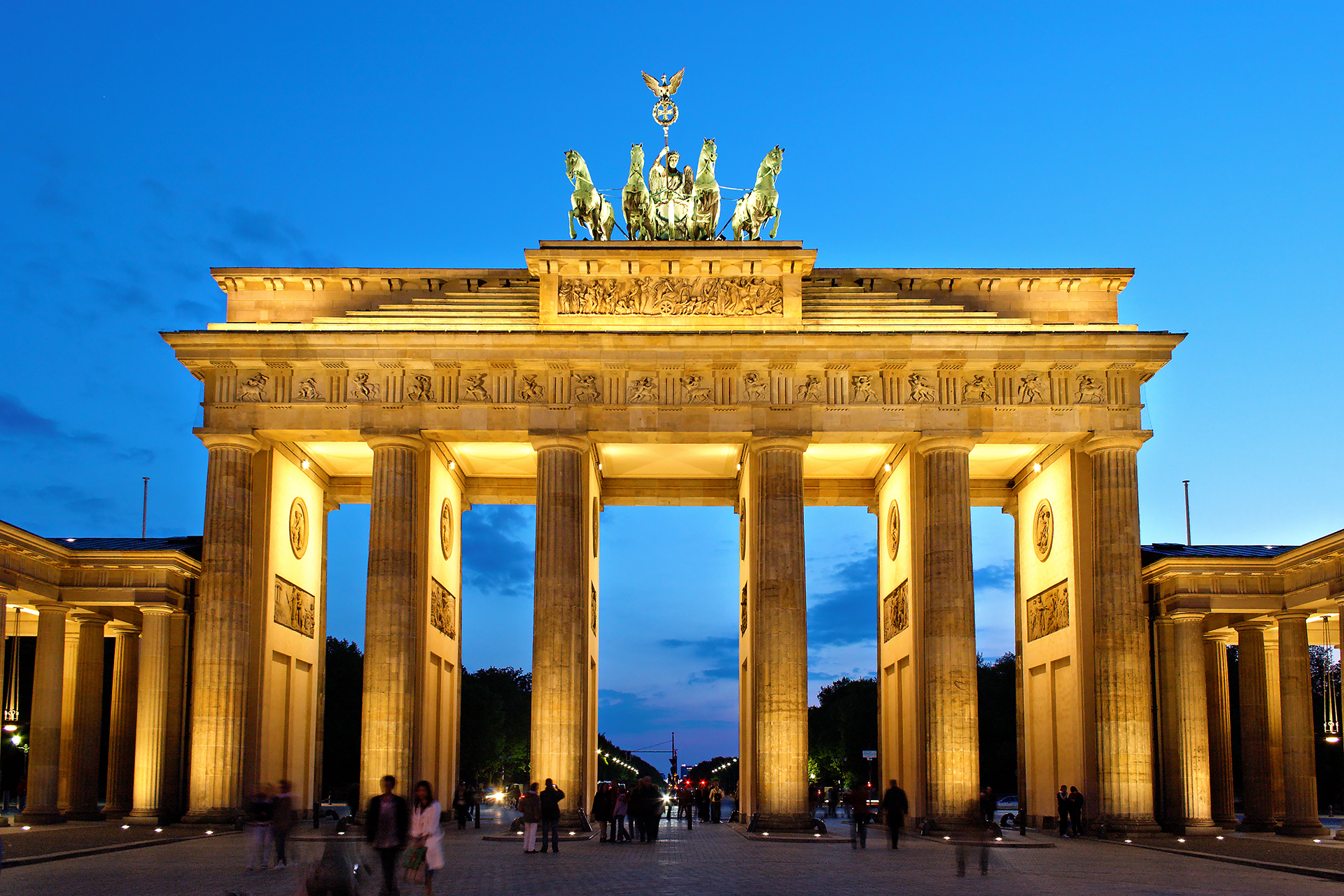
The company used Brandenburg Gate in its logo.

BFC's goal was to produce series in Germany that had "American style and quality". In addition to its head office in Berlin, it had a second office in Los Angeles. Michael Hefferon, who founded Phoenix Animation Studios in 1987 and was later appointed as president of Rainmaker Entertainment, worked for BFC for some time.

In 2003, it already had four completed television series: Mission Oddysey, Adventurers: Masters of Time, Altair in Starland and Shadow of the Elves. The company boosted its investment with the conversion of Happily N'Ever After from a 2D project to a 3D one, with the arrival of John H. Williams, who previously worked for Shrek, as well as installing Mental Ray and increasing its budget per minute of animation. The film ended up becoming a failure (17,000 viewers in Germany on opening weekend) and, as of November 2007 (at the time of release), the company was unable to recover €87 million worth of investment.

In 2006, it partnered with MGM and Brooksfilms to produce Spaceballs: The Animated Series,

BFC subsequently became dormant after 2009 and ceased to exist in 2011.

BAF was detached from BFC appointed Commerzbank as its liquidator; the separate company was ceased to exist on 7 October 2015.

== Identity ==
The company used the Brandenburg Gate as its logo accompanied with the initials bfc and berliner film companie underneath, both in lowercase.
