= Mumfie (2022 TV series) =

- Genre: Children's animation; Comedy
- Based on: Magic Adventures of Mumfie by Britt Allcroft
- Voices of: Luke Murray; Helen McAlpine; Lorne Macnaughton; John Scougall; Angela Darcy
- Composers: Camille Bazbaz; Franck Hedin; Nathalie Loriot
- Country of origin: France; Italy
- Original languages: French; English
- No. of episodes: 78

Production
- Executive producer: Sara Cabras
- Producers: Benoît Di Sabatino; Britt Allcroft
- Running time: 7 minutes per episode
- Production company: Zodiak Kids & Family France

Original release
- Release: 2022 – present

Related
- Magic Adventures of Mumfie

Mumfie is a French-Italian animated children's television series and a reboot of the 1994 British animated television series Magic Adventures of Mumfie by Britt Allcroft, in turn inspired by the Mumfie books written and illustrated by Katharine Tozer (1907–1943). It was produced by Zodiak Kids & Family France with animation production done by Animoka. 78 episodes were produced. Though credited as a producer, Britt Allcroft had little involvement in the reboot's production. It was also the last series to be released in her lifetime before her death in December 2024.

== Characters ==
=== Main ===
- Mumfie (voiced by Luke Murray): the main character of the series. He is an elephant who lives in a treehouse.
- Jelly Bean (voiced by Lorne Macnaughton): a color-changing jellyfish.
- Pinkey the Flying Pig (voiced by Helen McAlpine)

=== Recurring ===
- Black Cat (voiced by Helen McAlpine): a mischievous cat confidant, who is the advisor of King Kaleb.
- King Kaleb (voiced by Lorne Macnaughton): a cheeky crocodile who thinks he's a king. His advisor is Black Cat.
- Mr. Bernard (voiced by John Scougall): a hermit crab mayor.
- Yoyo (voiced by Angela Darcy): a giraffe who runs a hotel on an iceberg.
- Zephyr (voiced by John Scougall): a zebra who likes skateboarding.
- Boo Whale (voiced by Helen McAlpine): a jolly yellow whale. She gives Mumfie, Jelly Bean and Pinkey advices at times when there is a problem.
- Captains Ruby, Quartz and Agate (Ruby voiced by Helen McAlpine, Quartz voiced by Lorne Macnaughton and Agate voiced by Angela Darcy): a group of pirate wolves who run a café.
- Captain Krank: the pirate wolves' cousin. He sometimes likes showing off.
- Frogs: a group of frogs who help Mr. Bernard with garden work.
- Penguins: a group of penguins who help Yoyo in a hotel.

== Production ==
In May 2014, Britt Allcroft stated that she had begun production on a reboot of Mumfie. In July 2015, it was revealed that the kids' division of Zodiak Entertainment, which was behind shows such as Zack & Quack and Totally Spies!, had begun development of the show, with Britt Allcroft Productions.

In 2020, the series was announced to premiere in 2021, and would be animated by Italian animation studio Animoka. The series, which is now set on an island named Flutterstone, has new designs for pre-existing characters from the original series, giving them a more toy-like look as was the intention of the books (including Mumfie being shorter, with a smaller trunk and ears and actual hands and Pinkey now having a flower near her left ear), as well as new characters such as a jellyfish named Jelly Bean (who, due to the new setting, replaces Scarecrow as a central character), a crocodile named King Kaleb (to whom the Black Cat is now the advisor of) and Boo Whale (a re-imagined version of Whale). In 2022, it was announced that the series had been pre-sold to many networks overseas, including the original broadcaster, ITV.

== Episodes ==
Each episode is directed by Daniel Dubuis.

No. in series	Title	Written by	Original release date
1	"The Sand Castle"	Mathilde Maraninchi, Cyril Deydier and Antonin Poirée	TBA
2	"A Handy Treasure Hunt"	Mathilde Maraninchi	TBA
3	"The Invitation"	Cyril Deydier	TBA
4	"Beloved Pirates"	Antonin Poirée	TBA
5	"The Photo For Yoyo"	Mathilde Maraninchi	TBA
6	"The Present"	Cyril Deydier	TBA
7	"The Pink Mouse"	Antonin Poirée	TBA
8	"The Restaurant"	Cyril Deydier	TBA
9	"Story Night"	Cyril Deydier	TBA
10	"Firefly Day"	Cyril Deydier	TBA
11	"Woodpecker’s Companion"	Mathilde Maraninchi	TBA
12	"Achoo!"	Etienne Chédeville	TBA
13	"The Adventure Of The Lost Box"	Diane Morel	TBA
14	"Pumpkin Purée"	Diane Morel	TBA
15	"The Royal Ceremony"	Manuel Meyre	TBA
16	"The Harvest"	Manuel Meyre	TBA
17	"The Singers"	Eddy Fluchon	TBA
18	"A Surprise For Black Cat"	Baptiste Grosfiley	TBA
19	"King Kaleb’s Mug"	Elisa Loké and Giulia Volli	TBA
20	"The Detective Agency"	Eddy Fluchon	TBA
21	"Picnic Under The Stars"	Eddy Fluchon	TBA
22	"The Surprise Gift"	Eddy Fluchon	TBA
23	"A Day Without Black Cat"	Etienne Chédeville	TBA
24	"The King of Bubbles"	Diane Morel	TBA
25	"The Flying Throne"	Fabienne Gambrelle	TBA
26	"Go Mumfie!"	Elisa Loké and Giulia Volli	TBA
27	"The Three Promises"	Léa Lespagnol	TBA
28	"Silly Mumfie"	Cyril Deydier	TBA
29	"We Must Decide"	Mathilde Maraninchi	TBA
30	"Incredible Jellybean"	Cyril Deydier	TBA
31	"A Very Difficult Customer"	Cyril Deydier	TBA
32	"Blackout"	Diane Morel	TBA
33	"An Almost Perfect Cake"	Diane Morel	TBA
34	"The Broken Sunflower"	Elisa Loké and Giulia Volli	TBA
35	"Replacement Captain"	Etienne Chédeville	TBA
36	"The Lighthouse"	Cyril Deydier	TBA
37	"The Great Crossing Of The Island"	Baptiste Grosfiley	TBA
38	"A Little Joker"	Pierre Olivier	TBA
39	"The Imaginary Illness"	Cyril Deydier	TBA
40	"A Clean Bay"	Elisa Loké and Giulia Volli	TBA
41	"Shipwreck On The Lost Island"	Mathilde Maraninchi	TBA
42	"The First Flight"	Léa Lespagnol	TBA
43	"The Big Homecoming"	Léa Lespagnol	TBA
44	"The Most Beautiful Artwork"	Baptiste Grosfiley	TBA
45	"What A Funny Hat"	Cyril Deydier	TBA
46	"Rainbow Treasure"	Anne-Sophie Salles	TBA
47	"Disorganized Trip"	Léa Lespagnol	TBA
48	"Mumfie The Hero"	Thierry Sananès	TBA
49	"Mumfie Brings Good Luck"	Elisa Loké and Giulia Volli	TBA
50	"The Invasion" "The Unwanted Guests"	Cyril Deydier	TBA
51	"Catching The Moon"	Baptiste Grosfiley	TBA
52	"Message In A Bottle"	Cyril Deydier	TBA
53	"Mumfie’s Cruise"	Hadrien Krasker and Mathieu Bouckenhove	TBA
54	"The Night Flyer"	Pierre Olivier	TBA
55	"Camping In The Forest"	Hadrien Krasker and Mathieu Bouckenhove	TBA
56	"The Incredible Journey"	Cyril Deydier	TBA
57	"The Broken Tentacle"	Anne-Sophie Salles	TBA
58	"Friendship Bracelets"	Diane Morel	TBA
59	"The Great Oak Tree Show"	Thierry Sananès	TBA
60	"A Concert For The Frogs And Penguins"	Cyril Deydier	TBA
61	"The Island Of A Thousand Trembles"	Anne-Sophie Salles	TBA
62	"Hide And Seek"	Charlotte Guillebaud	TBA
63	"The Royal Juice"	Hadrien Krasker and Mathieu Bouckenhove	TBA
64	"Lulu and Captain Krank"	Cyril Deydier	TBA
65	"The Visitors"	Cyril Deydier	TBA
66	"Copy Cat"	Cyril Deydier	TBA
67	"Turtle Rescue Mission"	Mathilde Maraninchi	TBA
68	"The Acrobats"	Etienne Chédeville	TBA
69	"Grandma Zebra"	Léa Lespagnol	TBA
70	"Boo Whale’s Big Trip"	Anne-Sophie Salles	TBA
71	"The Dynamic Duo"	Léa Lespagnol	TBA
72	"Crazy Slackliners"	Anne-Sophie Salles	TBA
73	"Super Wolf"	Elisa Loké and Giulia Volli	TBA
74	"The One Penguin You Miss"	Thierry Sananès	TBA
75	"The New King Of The Island"	Baptiste Grosfiley	TBA
76	"The Flower Festival"	Pierre Olivier	TBA
77	"Flying Kites"	Mathilde Maraninchi	TBA
78	"The Photo Album"	Elisa Loké and Giulia Volli	TBA
