= Little Hippo =

- Also known as: Petit Potam
- Based on: Petit Potam by Christine Chagnoux
- Written by: Robin Lyons; Andrew Offiler; Suzanne Bailly; Annetta Zucchi; Douglas Booth; Françoise Boublil; Joe Boyle; Jill Brett; Jamie Brown; Herbert Carias-Freire; Stan Cullimore; Christophe Léger; Paul Finch; Alexandre Gelbert; Jean Helpert; Anthony Hodgson; Lucy Daniel-Raby; Béatrice Marthouret; Michael Maurer; Lavinia Murray; Dennis O’Flaherty; Stéphane Piera; Claude Raymond; Noëlle Septier-Saugout; Annie Smyth; Alexander Swinnerton; Jamila Taxit; Raymond de Thiebert; Pierre-François Bertrand
- Directed by: Bernard Deyriès
- Composers: Bill Baxter; Olivier Lanneluc; Jacques Bastello
- Countries of origin: France; Germany; Belgium; United Kingdom
- Original languages: French; German; English
- No. of seasons: 2
- No. of episodes: 52

Production
- Executive producer: Claude Berthier
- Producer: Maureen Sery
- Running time: 13 minutes
- Production companies: Marina Productions; EVA Entertainment; Neurones; Britt Allcroft (Development) Limited

Original release
- Network: France 3 (France); ZDF (Germany); RTL-TVI (Belgium); Playhouse Disney UK (United Kingdom)
- Release: 1 September 1997 – 1998

Little Hippo (French: Petit Potam) is an animated children's television series based on the French Petit Potam books by Christine Chagnoux. The series was an international co-production between Marina Productions, France 3, ZDF, EVA Entertainment, Neurones and The Britt Allcroft Company. The series debuted on France 3 in France on 1 September 1997.

== Premise ==
Little Hippo is about Little Hippo, Tessie, Tim, and Tam who live in Muddy Wallow.

== Characters ==
- Little Hippo
- Tessie
- Tim
- Tam

== Episodes ==
No.	Title	Directed by	Written by	Original release date
1	"L'equipe aero-potam"	Bernard Deyriès	Unknown	1 September 1997

== Broadcast ==
Little Hippo was broadcast in 1998 on Disney Channel in the United Kingdom.

== Film ==
Petit Potam – Le film is a film based on the series.
