= Britt Allcroft =

British filmmaker (1943–2024)

- Portrait of Allcroft posing with a 35mm movie camera
- Born: Hilary Mary Allcroft Coote; 14 December 1943; Worthing, West Sussex, England
- Died: 25 December 2024 (aged 81); Los Angeles, California, US
- Occupations: Screenwriter; producer; director; voice actress
- Years active: 1964–2024
- Spouse: Angus Wright (m. 1973; div. 1997)
- Children: 2

Britt Allcroft (born Hilary Mary Allcroft Coote; 14 December 1943 – 25 December 2024) was an English screenwriter, producer, director, and voice actress. She adapted Wilbert Awdry's The Railway Series in the form of the children's television series Thomas the Tank Engine & Friends (later retitled Thomas & Friends). She created Shining Time Station (with Rick Siggelkow), Mr. Conductor's Thomas Tales, and Magic Adventures of Mumfie. She also wrote, co-produced, and directed the film Thomas and the Magic Railroad (2000).

== Early life ==
Allcroft was born Hilary Mary Allcroft Coote in Worthing, West Sussex, on 14 December 1943. She was born to artist Jessie (née Harrison), and David Coote, a naval officer who left the family when she was five years old. Allcroft was raised in a modest household without a car or television during her early years. Growing up, she shared her home with an aunt who often recounted stories of her daily train commutes to London, igniting Allcroft's love for trains.

Allcroft had several stories published in a magazine when she was 15. After attending the town's high school, she enrolled in a secretarial course at Worthing College of Further Education. While studying there, she was one of the teenagers selected after a successful audition to interview celebrities for the 1960 BBC radio series Let's Find Out. At the age of 16, she left school and changed her first name to Britt as her career in British radio and television gained momentum. She went on to create a succession of programmes for the BBC and ITV during the 1970s and 1980s, including Moon Clue Game, Dance Crazy and Keepsakes. Mothers By Daughters, produced for Channel 4, was broadcast by PBS in the United States. She also worked in theatre, staging shows at the London Palladium and Drury Lane Theatres.

== Career ==
While making a documentary about British steam locomotives in August 1979, Allcroft met the Reverend Wilbert Awdry, author of the children's book series The Railway Series. She said "it really didn't take me long to become intrigued by the characters, the relationships between them and the nostalgia they invoked." She told him that she wanted to bring these stories to life and made an arrangement to secure certain rights through his then-publishers Kaye & Ward.

In 1980, she co-founded Britt Allcroft Railway Productions (later known as The Britt Allcroft Company) with her husband, television producer Angus Wright. It took Allcroft four years to raise the funding for, and create, a first series of 26 episodes in collaboration with director David Mitton. The first two episodes of Thomas the Tank Engine & Friends were aired together for the first time on British television on 9 October 1984, with narration by Ringo Starr and music by Mike O'Donnell and Junior Campbell.

The success of the series in the UK, and the merchandising campaign that Allcroft had been organising since 1983, soon led to further success in other parts of the world. In 1989, she and American producer Rick Siggelkow created Shining Time Station, a live-action children's sitcom fronted by the magical character of the miniature Mr. Conductor, who introduced two Thomas stories in each half-hour programme. Shining Time Station won a number of awards and significantly increased the popularity of the Thomas media franchise in the US. Shining Time Station lasted until 1995 and, in 1996, she created the short spin-off series Mr. Conductor's Thomas Tales.

In 1994, Allcroft followed Thomas the Tank Engine & Friends and Shining Time Station with the cartoon-animated Magic Adventures of Mumfie, in collaboration with director John Collins. Inspired by the books by Katharine Tozer, the production received critical acclaim and was seen worldwide. In 2008, several years after she left her original company, Allcroft revived the Mumfie library, and a reboot series eventually aired in 2021.

Allcroft wrote and directed Thomas and the Magic Railroad, a film based on the Thomas franchise, that was released in 2000. She also provided the voice of the character Lady. The film was a critical and commercial failure. The poor box-office performance of the film caused Allcroft to resign as deputy chairwoman of her company in September 2000.

Allcroft was an active member in the British Academy of Film and Television Arts and the Sundance Film Institute. She was also a fellow of the Institute of Directors.

Allcroft had expressed her disdain with the 2021 Thomas & Friends: All Engines Go cartoon series, which she had no creative control over, stating that the reboot lacked the "magic" of the original series.

In 2023, a documentary titled An Unlikely Fandom was released by filmmaker Brannon Carty, which centres around the Thomas & Friends adult fandom. Allcroft is featured in the documentary via both archival interview clips of her and interviews taken at her home in April 2022. She appeared at the film's premiere along with Carty and Shining Time Station co-creator Rick Siggelkow.

== Personal life and death ==
Allcroft married television producer Angus Wright in 1973. They had a son and daughter and divorced in 1997.

Allcroft advocated against the use of animals in circuses, believing them to be violent and harmful to the minds of children. She stated, "If we teach children that it's all right to dominate animals and use them for our amusement, how can we expect children to extend kindness to one another?"

Allcroft died in Los Angeles on 25 December 2024, eleven days after her 81st birthday. Her death was announced by filmmaker Brannon Carty on X on 3 January 2025.

== Filmography ==
Year	Title	Director	Screenwriter	Producer	Actress	Role	Notes
1964	Three Go Round	No	Yes	No	No	Presenter	Narrative script
1967–1968	Blue Peter	No	No	No	No		Member of production team
1967	Get It-Got It-Good	No	Yes	No	No		
1984–2003	Thomas & Friends	No	Yes	Yes	No		182 episodes; executive producer and script consultant
1989–1995	Shining Time Station	No	Yes	Yes	No		65 episodes; executive producer and writer
1990	Shining Time Station: 'Tis a Gift	No	Yes	Yes	No		Television special
1994–1998	Magic Adventures of Mumfie	Yes	No	No	Yes	The Queen of Night	Voice
1995	The Thomas the Tank Engine Man	No	No	No	Yes	Herself	Documentary
1996	Mr. Conductor's Thomas Tales	No	Yes	Yes	No		6 episodes
1996	Mumfie's Quest: The Movie	Yes	No	No	Yes	The Queen of Night	Voice
1999	Storytime with Thomas	Yes	No	No	No		2 episodes
2000	Thomas and the Magic Railroad	Yes	Yes	Yes	Yes	Lady	Voice
2022	Mumfie (2022 TV series)	No	No	Yes	No		
2023	An Unlikely Fandom	No	No	No	Yes	Herself	Documentary; final role
