= Magic Adventures of Mumfie =

British children's television series (1994–1998)

- Created by: Britt Allcroft
- Narrated by: Patrick Breen
- Music by: Larry Grossman
- Countries of origin: United Kingdom; Canada; Spain (series 3)
- Original language: English
- No. of series: 3
- No. of episodes: 79 (list of episodes)

Production
- Producers: Britt Allcroft; Michael Hefferon (Note: Producer of animation)
- Running time: 10 minutes
- Production companies: The Britt Allcroft Company (Note: Copyrighted under Quality Family Entertainment, Limited for Series 1 and Britt Allcroft (Mumfie) Limited for the other two.); Phoenix Animation Studios (Note: Animation co-produced with D'Ocon Films Production for series 3)

Original release
- Network: ITV (Children's ITV) (series 1); Fox Family Channel (series 2–3); Nick Jr. UK (series 2–3)
- Release: 22 September 1994 – 6 October 1998

Magic Adventures of Mumfie (full on-screen title: Britt Allcroft's Magic Adventures of Mumfie) is an animated children's television series and movie, inspired by the six Mumfie books written and illustrated by British author Katharine Tozer (1907–1943). The first series in 1994, spanning one continuous storyline, has a music score containing more than 20 songs. The series was created by Britt Allcroft (the creator of Thomas & Friends and its US debut, Shining Time Station), produced by The Britt Allcroft Company, narrated by American actor Patrick Breen and directed by John Laurence Collins, with animation produced in Toronto at Phoenix Animation Studios. Mumfie was first seen in the United States on the Fox Kids Network from 1995 to 1996, as part of The Fox Cubhouse. The second and third series debuted on the Fox Family Channel. 79 episodes were produced. The worldwide rights have reverted to Britt Allcroft.

== Episodes ==
Series	Episodes	Originally aired	
Series	Episodes	First aired	Last aired
1	13	September 22, 1994	December 15, 1994
Specials	2	December 23, 1995	September 8, 1996
2	27	August 24, 1998	September 8, 1998
3	39	September 9, 1998	October 6, 1998

== Characters ==
- Mumfie – The main character of the story, Mumfie is an elephant who lives in a little cottage in the woods. He always expects mail but never receives any. One day he decides to go on an adventure and the first thing he sees is a bird who asks if he can brighten up a dull tree.
- Scarecrow – When Mumfie first met Scarecrow, he was always in a field not ever moving until he set on the quest with him. Scarecrow is with Mumfie in all episodes.
- Pinkey the Flying Pig – Starting her first appearance in a farm where other pigs bully her, Pinkey is upset because she misses her mother so Scarecrow and Mumfie help her out.
- The Black Cat – A mysterious, magical cat who riddles Mumfie as he proceeds his journey. Disappearing and reappearing the black cat helps Mumfie in ways he doesn't expect. She has a niece who is a grey kitty.
- The Secretary – The villain of the first season's story who wants the Queen of Night's jewel as his source of power to rule all.
- Whale – Whale is Mumfie, Scarecrow and Pinkey's Friend who helps them to get to the island because instead of internal organs inside him, he has a glamorous, luxury room set with portholes, hammocks, carpets, and lights.
- Pinkey's mother – Pinkey wanted to see her mother with Mumfie and Scarecrow only to find that she didn't want her to get caught by the secretary.
- Bristle – At first a servant to the secretary Bristle is very strict about rules as he explains to Mumfie. When the secretary was defeated, he became loyal to the Queen of Night instead.
- Napoleon – Napoleon is the bird who is kept a prisoner by the secretary. He had his feathers cut off a long time ago and, believing he couldn't fly anymore went into deep depression, until Pinkey made him understood after all these years they have grown back which persuades him to fly.
- The Queen of Night – The queen was the ruler of the island which Mumfie goes to. She is undercover as the secretary wants her jewel to rule all. She is voiced by Britt Allcroft instead of Breen due to his inability to speak in a female voice.
- Mr and Mrs Admiral – These two married people were having a dream of living an underwater house (despite the fact that humans can't breathe underwater) until one day, when Mr Admiral was kidnapped by Davy Jones and his pirates which was a big blow to Mrs Admiral.
- Eel – Mumfie first met Eel in the cave that lead them to the pirates and Davy Jones because she was glowing in the dark.
- Davy Jones – Davy Jones is the leader of the pirates (who lived in their underwater ship) when he left he decided to be whale's companion.
- Pirates – These pirates served Davy Jones when they kept Mr Admiral a prisoner until they became good guys.
- Youare the Reindeer – Youare is a reindeer with twisted antlers whose first appearance was in "Mumfie's White Christmas". Despite the fact that "You are?" was a question that was asked to him in Santa's stables, he assumed that was his name.

== Production ==
Katharine Tozer's original Mumfie novels are:

- The Wanderings of Mumfie (1935)
- Here Comes Mumfie (1936)
- Mumfie the Admiral (1937)
- Mumfie's Magic Box (1938)
- Mumfie's Uncle Samuel (1939)
- Mumfie Marches On (1942)

The books were first adapted for television in 1975 as Here Comes Mumfie, an ITC Entertainment production produced by the team behind The Adventures of Rupert Bear using the same live-action puppetry style as that series. It aired between 1975 and 1976 and was broadcast on Independent Television (ITV) in the United Kingdom. Allcroft's newly created version, with an original musical score featuring 26 Broadway style songs, was broadcast on the Children's ITV block of UK's ITV network in 1994 and has since been broadcast in other countries, including the United States (on Fox Kids and the Fox Family Channel), Canada, Australia, France, Scandinavia, Finland, Germany, Japan, and Israel.

The screen library consists of Series 1 (originally a 13x10 minute serial, later edited into the movie length epic story Mumfie's Quest), the Holiday Special Mumfie's White Christmas and Series 2 totaling 62 individual story episodes. In 1999, the show was placed under the Bridgefilms joint venture with Sooty International Limited. and remained as such as The Britt Allcroft Company rebranded as Gullane Entertainment in 2000 and the purchase by HIT Entertainment in 2002. HIT placed Bridgefilms up for sale in October 2007 and Britt Allcroft re-acquired the series in March 2008, Her family-owned business, Britt Allcroft Productions LLV, signed a home entertainment distribution deal with Lionsgate in 2013, which resulted in two DVD releases the following year. Distribution rights to the series currently belong to Banijay Kids & Family under license by the Allcroft estate.

=== Reboot ===
In May 2014, Britt Allcroft stated that she had begun production on a reboot of Mumfie. In July 2015, it was revealed that the kids' division of Zodiak Entertainment, which was behind shows such as Zack & Quack and Totally Spies!, had begun development of the show, with Britt Allcroft Productions.

In 2020, the series was announced to premiere in 2021, and would be animated by Italian animation studio Animoka. The series, which is now set on an island named Flutterstone, has new designs for pre-existing characters from the original series, giving them a more toy-like look as was the intention of the books (including Mumfie being shorter, with a smaller trunk and ears and actual hands and Pinky now having a flower near her left ear), as well as new characters such as a jellyfish named Jelly Bean (who, due to the new setting, replaces Scarecrow as a central character), a crocodile named King Kaleb (to whom the Black Cat is now the advisor of) and Boo Whale (a re-imagined version of Whale). In June 2022, it was announced that the series had been pre-sold to many networks overseas, including the original broadcaster, ITV; the series premiered in France in March of that year.

== Home media ==
=== VHS releases ===
#	VHS name	Release date	Episode story
1	The Beginning of Things	24 October 1994	Includes: "The Beginning of Things", "A Whale of Discovery", "Pinky's Mysterious Island", and "Definitely Danger".
2	The Queen of Night	7 November 1994	Includes: "The Queen of Night", "Bottom of the Ocean Blues" and "Sea of Surprises". Even though a third release was advertised at the end of the second release, it never was released.

=== DVD releases ===
#	DVD name	Release date	Episode story
1	Mumfie's Quest: The Movie	28 July 2014	Includes: "Mumfie's Quest: The Movie"
2	Mumfie's White Christmas	3 November 2014	Includes: Mumfie's White Christmas, Bristle's Holiday, Reindeers Keep Dropping on My Head, and Pinkey's First Winter.

== Critical reception ==
During its original run, Britt Allcroft's Magic Adventures of Mumfie received positive reviews from critics. The Chicago Tribune called the show "a moving work of art", while the New York Daily News described the show as "gentle, smart and beautifully animated".

== Video game ==
An edutainment game based on the animated series of the same name, was released for the Konami Picno in 1995 and was developed and published by Konami.
