= Dargaud Marina =

French production company

- Formerly: Marina Productions (1990–1999)
- Type: Subsidiary
- Industry: Entertainment
- Founded: 1990; 36 years ago
- Founder: Claude Berthier
- Products: Animated series Documentaries; Feature films
- Parent: Dargaud (1997–present)

Dargaud Marina (formerly Marina Productions and currently Dargaud Media) is a French production company owned by Dargaud that produces animation, documentaries, and feature-length films.

The company was founded as Marina Productions by Claude Berthier in 1990, which was acquired by Dargaud in June 1997 and was renamed in 1999.

== Productions ==
Recent productions airing on French and foreign channels include:

- Valérian, co-produced by France 3.
- Boule & Bill/Billy and Buddy, co-produced by TF1.
- L'Ile de Black Mor (Theatrical).
- Les Aventures Fantastiques du Commandant Cousteau/Jacques Cousteau's Ocean Tales (France 3).
- Kitou Scrogneugneu (TF1), adapted from the book of the same name by A. Rocard, M. Degano, and F. Ruyer, published by Fleurus.
- The New Adventures of Lucky Luke (France 3).
- Les Fils de Rome/Roma, 101 AD on M6.
- Princesse du Nil/Princess of the Nile (France 2).
- La Dernière Réserve/The Last Reservation (TF1).
- Petit Potam (Little Hippo) on France 3.
- Monsieur Bonhomme/Mr. Men and Little Miss (Canal J).

Dargaud Marina's productions are sold to television channels all over the world; it continues to expand its stock of audiovisual content, adding two or three new series each year.

== See also ==
- Belvision
- Dargaud Media
- Ellipsanime
