= Phoenix Animation Studios =

Canadian animation studio

Phoenix Animation Studios Inc.
- Industry: Animation
- Founded: 1987; 39 years ago
- Defunct: 1998; 28 years ago
- Headquarters: Toronto, Ontario, Canada

Phoenix Animation Studios was an animation studio headquartered in Toronto, Ontario, Canada. It was founded in 1987 and closed in 1998.

== History ==
Phoenix Animation was founded in 1987 by Michael Hefferon, who served as its president. By 1996, Phoenix had become an associate company of Catalyst Entertainment, with Hefferon moving to Catalyst. Hefferon was later vice-president of production and development at Berliner Film Companie in Germany, managing director of Flying Bark Productions in Australia, and president and executive producer of Vancouver-based Rainmaker Entertainment.

Among Phoenix's last projects was Sitting Ducks which was handed off to Elliott Animation.

== Filmography ==
=== Films ===
- An Angel for Christmas (1996) (Note: Co-produced with Blye Migicovsky Productions)
- An Easter Tale (a. k. a. Maxwell Saves the Day) (1996)
- Call of the Wild (1996)
- Journey to the Center of the Earth (1996)
- Jungle Boy (1996)
- Noah's Magic Ark (1996)
- The Adventures of Young Moby Dick (1996)
- The Count of Monte Cristo (1997)
- The Little Princess (1996)
- The Prince and the Pauper (1996)
- Swiss Family Robinson (1996)
- The Toy Shop (1996)
- Camelot: The Legend (1998)

=== Television ===
- Britt Allcroft's Magic Adventures of Mumfie (1994–1998)
- Iron Man (Season 2) (1995–96)
- Gadget Boy & Heather (1995–1997)
- The True Meaning of Crumbfest (1998) (TV special)
- Eckhart (2000–2002)

=== Animation services ===
- Once Upon a Forest (1993) (additional animation)
- Thumbelina (1994) (additional key clean-up/character clean-up/inbetween services)
- A Goofy Movie (1995) (additional animation production)
- All Dogs Go to Heaven 2 (1996) (animation)
