= David Mitton =

British film director and producer (1939–2008)

- Mitton in the early 1980s
- Born: David Nelson Godfrey Mitton; 27 February 1939; Preston, Prestonpans, East Lothian, Scotland
- Died: 16 May 2008 (aged 69); London, England
- Occupations: Director; producer; writer; model maker; special effects technician
- Years active: 1965–2008
- Spouses: Judy; Joan Ferris
- Children: 1

David Nelson Godfrey Mitton (27 February 1939 – 16 May 2008) was a British director, producer, writer, model maker and special effects technician. He was best known for producing and directing the children's television programmes Thomas & Friends and Tugs. During the 1960s, he worked with Gerry and Sylvia Anderson as a special effects technician on series such as Thunderbirds, Captain Scarlet and the Mysterons, Joe 90, The Secret Service and UFO.

== Early life ==
Mitton was born on 27 February 1939 in Preston, Prestonpans, East Lothian and educated at Strathallan School in Perthshire. On leaving school, he briefly attended art school before joining the Royal Air Force in 1958. He served with the RAF at Christmas Island, and at Honolulu before returning to serve at Southern Region Air Traffic Control, RAF Uxbridge, later he served at RAF Riyan up-country from Aden in what is now Yemen. He also served in Cyprus with the air-sea rescue service, and then left the Royal Air Force in 1962.

== Career ==
=== Early career ===
On his return from RAF service in the early sixties, Mitton embarked on a career in children's television. He began working as a special effects technician on a series of programmes created by Gerry Anderson's AP Films that used a puppet technology called supermarionation. Mitton was a member of the supervising visual effects director Derek Meddings team, displaying a special skill in setting up the electronics necessary to blow up buildings on cue in Thunderbirds (1965–1966), Captain Scarlet and the Mysterons (1967–1968), Joe 90 (1968), The Secret Service (1969) and UFO (1970–1971).

As Gerry Anderson moved away from puppet animation, Mitton became freelance. He worked as assistant director to Ridley Scott on the famous Hovis commercials of the seventies in the United Kingdom and began directing animated television commercials himself. In the mid-seventies, he established a company called Clearwater Films (later Clearwater Features), with former Thunderbirds director Ken Turner and American-born producer Robert D. Cardona. The company soon gained a reputation for innovative stop-frame animated television commercials. Clearwater produced two award-winning commercials, one for Hovis set in an orbiting space station and another for PG Tips tea bags.

=== Thomas & Friends ===
Another commercial for "Prize Guys” yoghurt attracted the attention of television producer Britt Allcroft, who had acquired the television rights to a series of books known as The Railway Series from its author, the Reverend Wilbert Awdry. Allcroft approached Mitton to develop a pilot for a television series, and in a joint partnership between her production company (known as The Britt Allcroft Company) and Clearwater Features, they made Thomas the Tank Engine & Friends between 1984 and 2003. On 1 January 1991, Clearwater Features became part of The Britt Allcroft Company, and in 2002, HiT Entertainment bought out Allcroft and retitled the programme Thomas & Friends.

Mitton directed 180 out of 182 episodes of the seven series made between 1984 and 2003, as well as writing the scripts once the show began to deviate from adapting Awdry's work in 1991. Mitton was able to move each engine's eyes in real time – not stop-frame animation– by using a radio control linked to a motor mounted behind them, and there was a sculpted mask that could be changed to give different facial expressions. The role of the narrator was played by Ringo Starr for the first two series in the United Kingdom and the United States. Ringo Starr was replaced by Michael Angelis in the United Kingdom and George Carlin in the United States.

The show became an instant success on British television, and in 1989, Allcroft helped created Shining Time Station (1989–1995) in the United States on the Public Broadcasting Service. Because of the sequences that introduced the stories from Thomas the Tank Engine & Friends to American audiences, Shining Time Station became a successful television show. Merchandise for Thomas The Tank Engine & Friends had been available before the television programme, but the programme created a new multimillion-pound industry and became an unstoppable phenomenon which could be seen in 145 countries worldwide.Thomas & Friends also inspired a 2000 feature film, called Thomas and the Magic Railroad. Mitton was a creative consultant for the models used in the film.

Mitton left following the completion of the Series 7 of Thomas & Friends. Following Mitton's departure, crew member Steve Asquith took his place as director from Series 8 to Series 12.

=== Other projects ===
In 1989, inspired by the success of Thomas & Friends, Mitton and his new company, Clearwater Features, produced a new children's television series called TUGS, which lasted for thirteen episodes. The episodes were reformatted to American television for a show called Salty's Lighthouse by Robert D. Cardona. TUGS remains popular online and has an exhibition at the Midland Railway which preserves concept art, extended episode cuts, and the original models.

In 2006, Mitton started another company, Pineapple Squared Entertainment, with director David Lane, whom Mitton had worked with on Thunderbirds earlier in his career.

Mitton and Lane had been working on several projects prior to the former's death, including the production of the animated 26-part TV series Adventures on Orsum Island.

== Filmography ==
- Thunderbirds (1965-1966) - special effects technician
- Thunderbirds Are Go (1966) - special effects technician
- Captain Scarlet and the Mysterons (1967-1968) - special effects technician
- Thunderbird 6 (1968) - special effects technician
- Joe 90 (1968-1969) - special effects technician
- Battle of Britain (1969) - special effects
- Doppelgänger (1969) - special effects technician
- The Secret Service (1969) - special effects technician
- The Avengers (1969) - third assistant director
- UFO (1970) - special effects technician
- Portrait of a People: Impressions of Britain (1970) - assistant director
- Thomas the Tank Engine and Friends (1984-2003) - director
  - Director (180 episodes) (seasons 1-7)
  - Writer (147 episodes) (seasons 1-7)
  - Producer (130 episodes) (seasons 1-5)
  - Model Consultant (2 episodes) (season 6)
- TUGS (1989) - creator
  - Director (9 episodes)
  - Writer (6 episodes)
  - Voice of "Old Rusty" (1 episode; uncredited)
- Shining Time Station (1989-1995) - director (Thomas the Tank Engine and Friends segments)
- Bookmark (documentary series) (1995) - Himself
- Thomas and the Magic Railroad (2000) - model unit creative consultant
- Jack and the Sodor Construction Company (2003/2006) - model consultant (uncredited)
- Adventures on Orsum Island (2006/2008; unfinished) - creator, director, concept director, producer

== Personal life and death ==
Mitton was married twice and had one son.

Mitton died at age 69 on 16 May 2008, having suffered a fatal heart attack. The news of his death was not fully announced until 28 May.

== Awards and nominations ==
BAFTA Awards

- 1985: Nominated for Best Animated Film for Thomas the Tank Engine & Friends (shared with Britt Allcroft and Robert D. Cardona)
- 1987: Nominated for Best Animated Film for Thomas the Tank Engine & Friends (shared with Robert D. Cardona)
