= Ken Turner (director) =

British television and film director

- Occupations: Television and film director
- Organization: Clearwater Films (co-founder)
- Notable credit(s): Captain Scarlet and the Mysterons; Joe 90; UFO

Kenneth Turner (fl. 1966) is a British television and film director who worked extensively on series created by Gerry Anderson. After serving as assistant director on the film Thunderbirds Are Go (1966), he directed various episodes of Captain Scarlet and the Mysterons (1967–68), Joe 90 (1968–69) and UFO (1970–71). He made his film directorial debut with The Love Pill (1971), a sex comedy featuring Henry Woolf.

He later collaborated with David Mitton, a future director on Thomas & Friends, to establish their own company, Clearwater Films, from which they started to make TV advertisements using stop motion. After Turner left the company, Mitton teamed up with director Robert D. Cardona to change the name to Clearwater Features, the production company behind the first two seasons of Thomas and its spin-off, Tugs.
