= TUGS =

TUGS may refer to:

- Tugs (TV series) A British children's television series.
- tugboats
