= Thomas and the Magic Railroad =

2000 film by Britt Allcroft

- British theatrical release poster
- Directed by: Britt Allcroft
- Written by: Britt Allcroft
- Based on: The Railway Series by Wilbert Awdry; Thomas & Friends by Britt Allcroft; Shining Time Station by; Britt Allcroft; Rick Siggelkow
- Produced by: Britt Allcroft; Phil Fehrle
- Starring: Peter Fonda; Mara Wilson; Alec Baldwin; Didi Conn; Russell Means; Cody McMains; Michael E. Rodgers
- Cinematography: Paul Ryan
- Edited by: Ron Wisman
- Music by: Hummie Mann (Note: The original Thomas & Friends themes and songs were composed by Junior Campbell and Mike O'Donnell.)
- Production companies: Destination Films; Gullane Pictures; Isle of Man Film Commission
- Distributed by: Icon Film Distribution (United Kingdom); Destination Films (United States)
- Release dates: 9 July 2000 (Odeon Leicester Square); 14 July 2000 (United Kingdom); 26 July 2000 (United States)
- Running time: 86 minutes
- Countries: United Kingdom; United States
- Language: English
- Budget: $19 million
- Box office: $19.7 million

Thomas and the Magic Railroad is a 2000 fantasy adventure film written and directed by Britt Allcroft and produced by Allcroft and Phil Fehrle. The cast includes Alec Baldwin, Peter Fonda, Mara Wilson, Didi Conn, Russell Means, Cody McMains, Michael E. Rodgers, and the voices of Eddie Glen and Neil Crone. The film is based on the British children's book series The Railway Series by Wilbert Awdry, its televised adaptation Thomas & Friends by Allcroft, and the American television series Shining Time Station by Allcroft and Rick Siggelkow.

The plot is centered on Lily Stone (Wilson), the granddaughter of the caretaker (Fonda) of an enchanted steam engine who is lacking an appropriate supply of coal, and Mr. Conductor (Baldwin) of Shining Time Station, whose provisions of magical gold dust are at a critical low. Lily and Mr. Conductor enlist the help of Thomas the Tank Engine (Glen), who confronts the ruthless, steam engine-hating Diesel 10 (Crone) along the way.

Then-vice-chairman of Paramount Pictures, Barry London, approached Allcroft with the idea of a Thomas film adaptation in 1995. Paramount shelved the film after London departed from the company; production later resumed with Isle of Man Film and Destination Films, where London had become chairman. Filming took place in 1999 in Pennsylvania, Toronto and on the Isle of Man. The film underwent extensive re-editing in response to feedback from test screenings, resulting in the recasting of several voice actors and the removal of Doug Lennox's performance as P.T. Boomer, who was initially intended as a major antagonist.

Thomas and the Magic Railroad premiered on 9 July 2000. The film was panned by critics for its performances, plot, special effects, and lack of fidelity to the source material. It was also a box-office bomb, grossing $19.7 million worldwide against a production budget of $19 million. As a result of the film's poor reception, Allcroft resigned from her production company, The Britt Allcroft Company, in September 2000. HIT Entertainment acquired the company two years later, including the television rights to Thomas. As of October 2020, a second theatrical Thomas & Friends film is in development at Mattel Studios, a division of Mattel, the current owner of HiT Entertainment, with Marc Forster serving as director.

== Plot ==
Sir Topham Hatt and his family have left the Island of Sodor on holiday, leaving Mr. Conductor from Shining Time in charge of the railway. Thomas the Tank Engine informs Gordon of Mr. Conductor's arrival at a station just as Diesel 10—a diesel locomotive with a hydraulic claw—returns to Sodor. Diesel 10 plans to rid Sodor of steam engines by destroying Lady, the lost engine who can produce magic by travelling on a magic railroad that connects Sodor to Shining Time. Lady had been hidden in a workshop on Muffle Mountain by her driver, Burnett Stone, after he failed to protect her from Diesel 10's previous attempt to destroy her. Lady is unable to steam despite trying all of the coals in Indian Valley. That night, when Diesel 10 attacks Tidmouth Sheds, Mr. Conductor realises his supply of magic gold dust, which allows him to teleport between Sodor and Shining Time, is running low.

The following day, Mr. Conductor runs out of gold dust whilst searching for its source. He calls his cousin, C. Junior, to help him with the gold dust crisis. That night, Diesel 10 spies on Percy and Thomas, who conclude that there is a secret railway between Sodor and Shining Time. Diesel 10 tells his henchmen, Splatter and Dodge, of his plans to destroy Lady. Toby overhears and distracts Diesel 10, who accidentally knocks one of the shed supports with his claw, which collapses the roof on top of them. The next morning, Thomas collects coal trucks and unknowingly pushes one through the buffers that lead to the magic railroad. Mr. Conductor is abducted by Diesel 10, who threatens to drop him off a viaduct unless he divulges the location of the buffers; Mr. Conductor cuts one of the claw's hydraulic pipes and is thrown free. He lands at the Sodor windmill, where he finds a clue to the source of the gold dust.

Burnett's granddaughter Lily meets Patch, who takes her to Shining Time where she meets Junior. Junior takes her through the magic railroad to Sodor, where they meet Thomas. Thomas takes them to the windmill, where they find Mr. Conductor. That night, Percy discovers that Splatter and Dodge have found the Sodor entrance to the magic railroad and goes to warn Thomas. While traveling through the magic railroad to take Lily home, Thomas discovers the missing coal truck. Lily goes to find Burnett, reluctantly leaving Thomas stranded. Thomas uncontrollably rolls down a cliffside and re-enters the magic railroad through another secret portal.

Burnett explains to Lily the problem of getting Lady to steam. Lily suggests using a special coal from Sodor, and Burnett uses it to successfully start Lady. Lady takes them along the magic railroad and (followed by Thomas) returns to Sodor. Diesel 10 arrives with Splatter and Dodge, who decide to stop helping him. Diesel 10 then chases Thomas and Lady and tries to cross the viaduct, but it collapses under his weight and he falls into a sludge-filled barge. Lily combines water from a wishing well and shavings from the magic railroad to make more gold dust. Mr. Conductor passes his position as conductor to Junior before they depart. Lily, Burnett, Patch, and Mutt return to Shining Time; Lady returns to the magic railroad; and Thomas travels home into the sunset.

== Cast ==
=== Live-action ===
- Alec Baldwin as Mr. Conductor, the railway conductor of Shining Time Station. Baldwin succeeds Ringo Starr and George Carlin, both of whom had played the character on Shining Time Station.
- Peter Fonda as Burnett Stone, Lily's grandfather and Lady's caretaker and driver
  - Jared Wall as young Burnett
- Mara Wilson as Lily Stone, Burnett's granddaughter
- Michael E. Rodgers as Mr. C. Junior, Mr. Conductor's hard-partying cousin
- Cody McMains as Patch, a young teenage boy who works with Burnett Stone
- Didi Conn as Stacy Jones, the manager of Shining Time Station
- Russell Means as Billy Twofeathers, the engineer of the Rainbow Sun, Shining Time Station's flagship locomotive. He was previously played by Tom Jackson on Shining Time Station.

In the original version of the film, Doug Lennox portrayed Burnett Stone's rival P.T. Boomer, who served as the story's original antagonist. The character was cut from the film prior to its release.

=== Voice ===
- Eddie Glen as Thomas, a blue tank engine. John Bellis provided the voice of Thomas in the original cut of the film, before being replaced prior to the film's release.
- Linda Ballantyne as Percy, a small green tank engine who is Thomas's best friend. Michael Angelis provided the voice of Percy in the original cut of the film, before being replaced prior to the film's release.
- Susan Roman as James, a red mixed-traffic tender engine. Angelis also provided the voice of James in the original cut of the film, before being replaced prior to the film's release.
- Colm Feore as Toby, a brown steam tram engine
- Britt Allcroft as Lady, a small Victorian-styled tank engine owned by Burnett Stone, who runs the Magic Railroad
- Shelley-Elizabeth Skinner as Annie and Clarabel, Thomas's passenger coaches
- Kevin Frank as
  - Henry, a green tender engine
  - Dodge, a bumbling diesel, one of Diesel 10's cronies, and Splatter's twin
  - Bertie, a bus whose services run on the roads along Thomas's branch line
  - Harold, a helicopter that works on the Island of Sodor
  - Sir Topham Hatt, the railway controller of the Island of Sodor (uncredited)
- Neil Crone as
  - Gordon, the blue tender engine who pulls the main line express
  - Diesel 10, an evil diesel engine with a hydraulic claw he affectionately calls "Pinchy", who hates steam engines and wants to destroy them, especially the magic engine Lady. Keith Scott provided the voice of Diesel 10 in the original cut of the film, before being replaced prior to the film's release.
  - Splatter, a bumbling diesel, one of Diesel 10's cronies, and Dodge's twin
  - A tumbleweed with a Southern-American accent

== Production ==
=== Development ===
In the early 1990s, the character of Thomas the Tank Engine (adapted from the Wilbert Awdry's The Railway Series to the television series, Thomas the Tank Engine & Friends, by Britt Allcroft) was at the height of his popularity following three successful series. At the same time, Shining Time Station (an American series that combined episodes from the previous series with original live-action characters and scenarios, also created by Allcroft along with Rick Siggelkow) was made, and was also successful. As early as 1994, prior to the launch of Thomas's fourth series, Britt Allcroft had plans to make a feature film based on both of these series, and would make use of the model trains from Thomas and the live-action aesthetic of Shining Time Station.

In 1995, Britt Allcroft was approached by Barry London, then vice-chairman of Paramount Pictures, with an idea for the Thomas film. On 20 February 1996, it was announced that production had begun, with the working title of Thomas and the Magic Railroad. London's interest is thought to have stemmed from his three-year-old daughter, who was enthralled by Thomas. According to a press release, filming was to take place at Shepperton Studios, in the United Kingdom, and in the United States, with the theatrical release date set for 1997. However, later that year, after London left the company, Paramount shelved the plans for the film. This left Allcroft to seek other sources of funding. Discussions with PolyGram about the film were held, but not for long; the company was in the middle of a corporate restructuring and sale.

In the summer of 1998, during the fifth series of Thomas's production, Allcroft saw an advert for Isle of Man Film. They were offering tax incentives to companies wanting to film on the island. Allcroft visited and felt that the location was perfect. During that year, Barry London became chairman of the newly founded Destination Films (owned by Sony Pictures). He renewed his interest in the project, and Destination Films became the main financial backer and studio for the film.

=== Distribution ===
In addition to being a major studio and financial backer, Destination announced in February 1999 that they would distribute the film in the United States while handling a possible sales exchange in the United Kingdom and Ireland. Gullane Pictures would handle international sales rights in all other territories. In June 1999, Icon Film Distribution acquired the British distribution rights to the film from Destination.

=== Casting ===
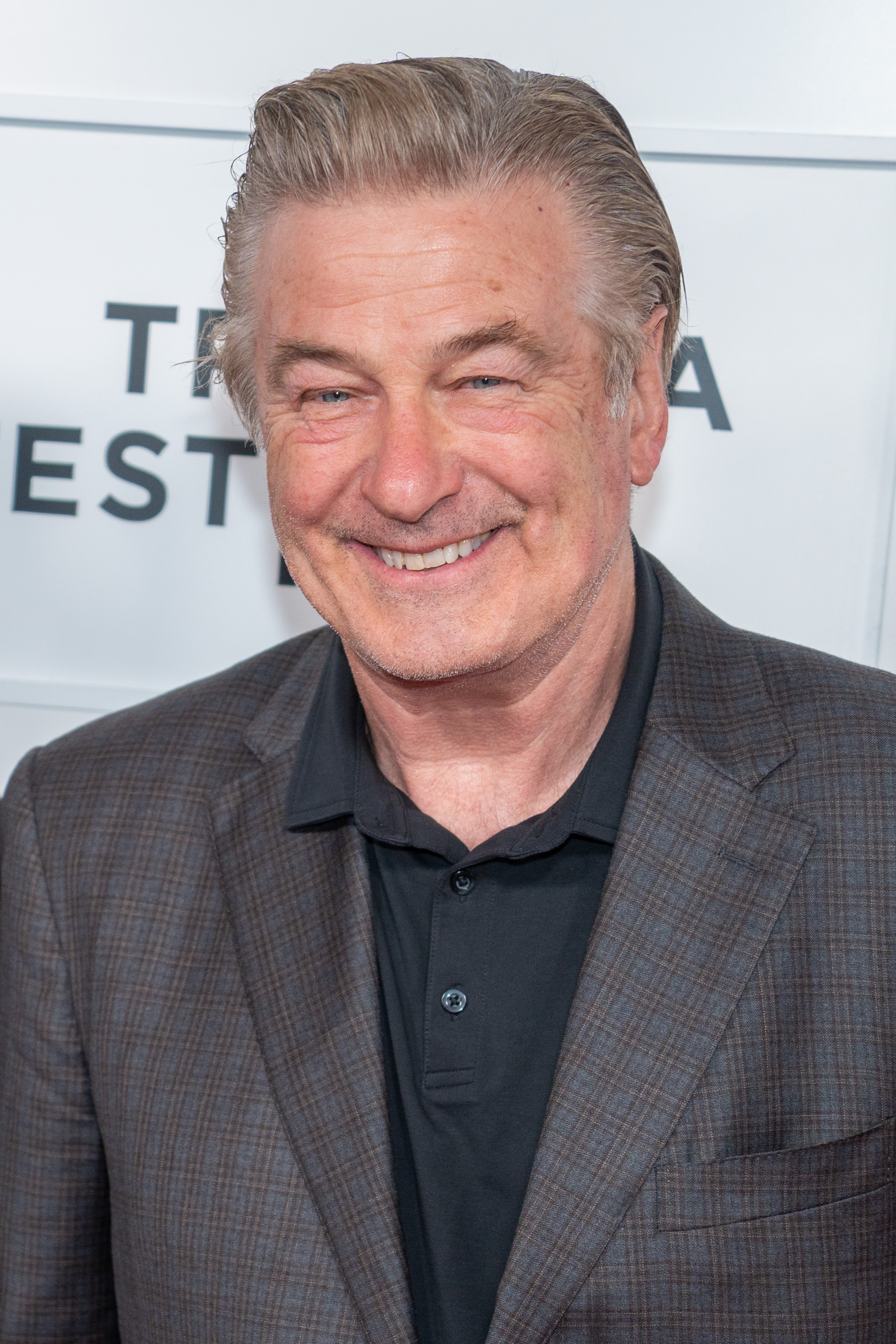
Alec Baldwin, who portrayed Mr.Conductor in the film, pictured in 2026.

In early August 1999, it was announced that Alec Baldwin, Mara Wilson, and Peter Fonda had joined the cast to play Mr. Conductor, Lily Stone, and Burnett Stone, respectively. David Jacobs, the former vice president of The Britt Allcroft Company, stated that Baldwin got involved in the project because his daughter Ireland was a fan of the series. Wilson would retire from acting shortly after the film's release. John Bellis was originally attached to voice Thomas, but was replaced by Canadian actor Edward Glen. Ewan McGregor and Bob Hoskins had also expressed interest in the role. Michael Angelis, the UK narrator for the Thomas & Friends television series at the time, was originally cast to voice both James and Percy, but was later replaced by voice actresses Susan Roman and Linda Ballantyne. Keith Scott was originally set to voice Diesel 10, but was later replaced by Neil Crone in the final film.

=== Filming ===
Principal photography began in July 1999. Filming took place at the Strasburg Rail Road in Strasburg, Pennsylvania, as well as in Toronto, Ontario, Canada, and on the Isle of Man. Castletown railway station on the Isle of Man Railway formed part of Shining Time Station and the goods shed at Port St Mary railway station became Burnett Stone's workshop. Running shots of the "Indian Valley" train were filmed at the Strasburg Rail Road location in September. The large passenger station where Lily boards the train is the Harrisburg Transportation Center. Norfolk & Western 4-8-0 475 was repainted as the Indian Valley locomotive. Sodor was realised using models and chroma key. The models were animated using live action remote control, as in the television series. The model sequences were filmed in Toronto instead of Shepperton Studios, the "home" of the original TV series; however, several of the show's key staff were flown over to participate. The Magic Railway was created using models, computer-generated imagery, and water-coloured matte paintings.

=== Post-production ===
In a 2007 interview with Sodor Island Forums & Fansite, Allcroft revealed that before the film's theatrical release, she and editor Ron Wisman were asked to substantially rework the film from how she had originally envisioned it, in response to criticism from test screenings. Burnett's rival P.T. Boomer (played by Doug Lennox), who was the original antagonist and character originally responsible for wrecking Lady, was removed after test audiences at the March 2000 preview screenings in Los Angeles considered Boomer to be "too scary" for young children. Despite most of his scenes being removed, Boomer can still be seen briefly in one scene, however the scene was redubbed with Boomer as a lost motorcyclist talking to Burnett for directions; in the original cut, Boomer and Burnett were having an argument.

Lily Stone (played by Mara Wilson) was intended to be the narrator of the story. Before filming, Thomas's voice was provided by John Bellis, a British fireman and part-time taxi driver who worked on the film as the Isle of Man transportation co-ordinator and facilities manager. Bellis got the role when he happened to pick up Allcroft and her crew from the Isle of Man Airport in July 1999. According to Allcroft, after hearing him speak for the first time, she told her colleagues, "I have just heard the voice of Thomas. That man is exactly how Thomas would sound!" A few days later, she offered the role to Bellis, and he accepted. However, the test audiences felt that his voice sounded "too old" for Thomas, although Bellis did receive onscreen credit as "Transportation Co-Ordinator".

Bellis said that he was "gutted" by the changes, but still wished the filmmakers well. In an April 2000 interview, following the changes, he said, "It was supposed to be my big break, but it hasn't put me off and I am hoping something else will come along." English actor Michael Angelis, who was the UK narrator of the series at the time, was the original voice of both James and Percy, but was recast for the same reason as Bellis. Australian voice actor Keith Scott originally voiced Diesel 10 (as evidenced in both the US and UK trailers), but he believes that he was recast because test audiences claimed that his portrayal was "too scary" for young children.

=== Music and soundtrack ===
Thomas and the Magic Railroad Soundtrack

Soundtrack album by: Hummie Mann; Mike O' Donnell; Junior Campbell
- Released: 25 October 2000
- Length: 48:19
- Label: Unforscene Music Ltd.

The soundtrack to Thomas and the Magic Railroad was released on both CD and cassette on 25 October 2000, through Unforscene Music. It features twelve music tracks from the feature film composed by Hummie Mann, and features additional music by Steven Page, Maren Ord, Dayna Manning, Joe Henry, and Atomic Kitten. The soundtrack received a more favorable reception than the film.

Track listing
No.	Title	Artist	Length
1.	"He's a Really Useful Engine"	Steven Page	1:32
2.	"Shining Time"	Maren Ord	3:18
3.	"I Know How the Moon Must Feel"	Dayna Manning	3:22
4.	"Some Things Never Leave You"	Joe Henry	2:57
5.	"Summer Sunday"	Dominic Gibbeson; Dominic Goundar; Rob Jenkins; Gerard McLachlan; Ben Wright	2:59
6.	"The Locomotion"	Atomic Kitten	3:54
7.	"Main Title"		3:32
8.	"Lily Travels to the Island of Sodor"		4:33
9.	"Burnett and Lady/Diesel 10 and Splodge"		3:28
10.	"Diesel 10 Threatens Mr. C/Lily & Patch"		4:25
11.	"Through the Magic Buffers"		6:36
12.	"The Chase, the Clue and the Happy Ending"		7:43
Total length:			48:19

== Release ==
=== Theatrical ===
Thomas and the Magic Railroad premiered at the Odeon Leicester Square on 9 July 2000; it was released theatrically in the United Kingdom and Ireland on 14 July, and on 26 July in the United States and Canada. The film was released in Australia on 14 December 2000, and in New Zealand on 7 April 2001. The film was distributed by both Icon, and Destination Films. National press coverage was low, as many journalists were concentrating on the launch of the book Harry Potter and the Goblet of Fire, for which a special train called "Hogwarts Express" would run from 8 to 11. In September 2020, it was announced that the film would be re-released in theaters on 24 October 2020, for the film's 20th anniversary with all the deleted scenes restored.

=== Home media ===
==== United Kingdom ====
Thomas and the Magic Railroad was originally released on VHS and DVD by Icon Home Entertainment and Warner Home Video on 19 October 2000. The film was re-released on DVD on 16 July 2007, this time being self-distributed by Icon themselves.

==== United States ====
The film was released on VHS and DVD by Columbia TriStar Home Video on 31 October 2000. The only special features on the DVD release are a deleted scene and the theatrical trailer. In 2007, the film was released as part of a double feature with The Adventures of Elmo in Grouchland. It was also released as part of a triple feature with The Adventures of Milo and Otis and The Bear. A re-release of Thomas and the Magic Railroad on DVD and Blu-ray, as a 20th anniversary edition from Shout! Factory, took place on 29 September 2020. The 20th anniversary edition includes a two-part documentary of the film, new interviews with the cast and crew, and a rough-cut version of the film, including extended and deleted scenes as well as the storyline of P.T. Boomer.

== Reception ==
=== Box office ===
The film opened on 314 screens in the United Kingdom on 14 July 2000 and grossed £431,286 in its opening weekend, ranking fifth at the UK box office. In its opening weekend in the U.S., the film grossed $4.2 million, ranking at ninth place at the box office that weekend. It grossed $19.7 million worldwide, against a production budget of $19 million.

=== Critical response ===
Thomas and the Magic Railroad was panned by critics. On the review aggregator website Rotten Tomatoes, 22% of 65 critics' reviews are positive, with an average rating of 4/10. The website's consensus reads: "Kids these days demand cutting edge special effects or at least a clever plot with cute charectors [sic]. This movie has neither, having lost in its Americanization what the British original did so right." Metacritic, which uses a weighted average, assigned the film a score of 19 out of 100, based on 23 critics, indicating "overwhelming dislike". Audiences polled by CinemaScore gave the film an average grade of "B" on an A+ to F scale.

Roger Ebert of the Chicago Sun-Times gave the film one star out of four, and wrote "(the fact) That Thomas and the Magic Railroad made it into theaters at all is something of a mystery. This is a production with 'straight to video' written all over it. Kids who like the Thomas books might kinda like it. Especially younger kids. Real younger kids. Otherwise, no." While he admired the models and art direction, he criticized how the engines' mouths did not move when they spoke, the overly depressed performance of Peter Fonda, as well as the overall lack of consistency in the plot. Elvis Mitchell of The New York Times gave the film a negative review, saying, "Mr. Baldwin's attack – there's no better way to put it – is unforgettable." Meanwhile Michael Thomson of BBC News criticized the plot, acting, and lack of fidelity to the source material, writing "Thomas and the Magic Railroad spells out its simple plot ad nauseam and is so stretched that even averagely bright kids will be offended by the repetition." And gave the film a two out of five stars.

William Thomas of Empire magazine gave the film a one out of five stars; he was critical of the films special effects, stating that "believe it or not, the true villains of the piece are, in fact, the 'special' effects. Quite how – in today's era of slo-mo and seamless digital wizardry – such a shoddy result can have been achieved is anyone's guess. With clunky bluescreen, spot-a-mile-off matte work and an absolute lack of synergy between real-life and animated action, it all conspires to provide an appropriately amateur sheen." Plugged In stated, "While the animation maintains its simple appearance, the plot is anything but simple. And that's not good news for the many tots who make up the majority of Thomas's audience. Switching back and forth between Shining Time and Sodor, interweaving two relatively complex story lines, may confuse more than it challenges." Nell Minow of Common Sense Media gave the film three out of five stars and wrote that it "will please [Thomas fans]" but that the plot "might confuse kids".

=== Accolades ===
Year	Association	Category	Recipient	Result	Ref.
2000	YoungStar Award	Best Young Actress/Performance in a Motion Picture Comedy	Mara Wilson	Nominated	
2001	Young Artist Award	Leading Young Actress	Mara Wilson	Nominated	

== Legacy ==
=== Corporate restructuring ===
In September 2000, Allcroft resigned from her company, The Britt Allcroft Company. The company later announced they would soon be renamed Gullane Entertainment, in order to expand their brands worldwide. Allcroft would remain as a creative consultant for the franchise up until series 7 in 2003. In July 2002, the British entertainment company HIT Entertainment agreed to purchase Gullane for £139 million. HIT attempted to purchase the company for £224 million in March 2000, but the deal did not go through at the time.

=== Sequel and live-action adaptation ===
Multiple attempts at a second theatrical Thomas film have been made. On 1 July 2000, it was reported that Destination Films had begun development on a sequel.

In 2009, HiT announced that a live-action adaptation film of Thomas & Friends would be the pilot project of its theatrical division. It was originally targeted for a late 2010 release, but this was revised to Spring 2011. By January 2011, the release date had been pushed back further, to 2012. The initial draft of the script was written by Josh Klausner, who has also said that the film would be set around the time of World War II; Will McRobb and Chris Viscardi also helped write the script. The final update of the film was on 8 June 2011, when it was announced that 9 director Shane Acker would direct the film, with Weta Digital designing the visual effects.

On 6 October 2020, it was announced that Marc Forster would be directing a new theatrical live-action animated film based on Thomas & Friends. It is to be written by Alyssa Hill and Jesse Wigutow. Executive producer Robbie Brenner described the film as "a four-quadrant family adventure that blends live-action and animation", adding that Thomas's story in the film will be told "in a modern and unexpected way". As of July 2023, it is in "active development", alongside other films based on Mattel properties. In June 2025, Mattel Films merged with the Mattel Television division to become Mattel Studios.
