= Thomas & Friends series 6 =

Season of television series

Thomas & Friends
- Series 6
- DVD cover art
- No. of episodes: 26

Release
- Original network: Nick Jr.
- Original release: 16 September – 21 October 2002

Series chronology
- ← Previous; Series 5 Next → Series 7

Thomas the Tank Engine & Friends is a children's television series about the engines and other characters working on the railways of the Island of Sodor, and is based on The Railway Series books written by Wilbert Awdry.

This article lists and details episodes from the sixth series of the show, which was first broadcast in 2002.

This series was narrated by Michael Angelis for the UK audiences, who also re-dubbed two episodes for US audiences, while Alec Baldwin narrated all of the episodes for the US audiences, in what was also his last series. Six episodes were later re-dubbed for PBS Kids by Michael Brandon.

In the United States, this was the second season of the series that was not aired on PBS Kids, instead being released straight-to-video. Most episodes in this series have one title; the American titles are shown underneath the United Kingdom titles.

This was the first series produced by Gullane Entertainment following its rename in 2000.

== Production ==
Phil Fehrle had taken over as producer from David Mitton and Britt Allcroft, while Angus Wright had been replaced by Allcroft and Peter Urie as executive producers.

This was the first series to oversee an introduction of a writing staff, since the stories from The Railway Series had already been adapted. Staff-written stories had been introduced in Series 5, and this practice remained unchanged. The series was filmed between January and August 2002, and premiered on September 16, 2002.

Abi Grant served as script editor for the series.

Steve Asquith, who would later become the all-out director of Thomas & Friends, directed two series 6 episodes in place of David Mitton. However, David still directed the other 24 episodes and went on until series 7. After that, Steve Asquith took over for good.

== Episodes ==
No. overall	No. in series	UK title (top) US title (bottom)	Directed by	Written by	Original release date	Official No.
131	1	"Salty's Secret"	David Mitton	Robin Kingsland	16 September 2002	602
A new dockyard diesel shunter called Salty is let down when he is assigned to work at the Quarry with Mavis. However, he soon finds joy in Quarry work when his songs and stories of the sea gets the trucks to cooperate, much to Bill and Ben's jealousy.
132	2	"Harvey to the Rescue"	David Mitton	Jonathan Trueman	17 September 2002	603
The engines are skeptical of a new crane engine named Harvey, but he soon proves his usage after Percy has an accident.
133	3	"No Sleep for Cranky"	David Mitton	Paul Larson	18 September 2002	601
Cranky ends up being even more Cranky than ever after having to listen to Salty's stories all day. He soon gets what he paid for when he accidentally knocks over a shed; stranding Bill, Ben and Salty.
134	4	"A Bad Day for Harold the Helicopter" (Note: Also shortened to "A Bad Day for Harold" for Salty's Secret & Other Thomas Adventures in the U.S. and Half-Hour Series 9 broadcasts.)	David Mitton	Teleplay by : Simon Nicholson; Story by : David Mitton	19 September 2002	604
Harold boasts to Percy that he can deliver the mail faster than him, and when Percy gets held up at a broken signal, seizes the chance to prove it. But Harold gets his comeuppance when he recklessly attempts to carry the whole load at once, causing his motor to break.
135	5	"Elizabeth the Vintage Lorry"	David Mitton	Paul Larson	20 September 2002	605
135	5	"Elizabeth the Vintage Quarry Truck" (Note: Salty's Secret & Other Thomas Adventures)	David Mitton	Paul Larson	20 September 2002	605
When Thomas breaks his coupling rods, his crew finds a vintage quarry Sentinel lorry named Elizabeth inside a shed.
136	6	"The Fogman"	David Mitton	Teleplay by : Jonathan Trueman; Story by : David Mitton	23 September 2002	606
136	6	"The Fog Man" (Note: Thomas' Halloween Adventures)	David Mitton	Teleplay by : Jonathan Trueman; Story by : David Mitton	23 September 2002	606
Cyril the Fogman gets replaced by a railway foghorn, but Sir Topham Hatt later realizes how unreliable it is when Thomas has a landslide accident directly caused by the foghorn.
137	7	"Jack Jumps In"	Steve Asquith	Jonathan Trueman, Phil Fehrle and Abi Grant	24 September 2002	607
Thomas delivers a friendly, enthusiastic new front loader called Jack to Miss Jenny's excavation site. However, Jack's eagerness to help leads him to try jobs that he is not suited to, which ultimately causes him to have an accident.
138	8	"A Friend in Need"	Steve Asquith	Phil Fehrle, Jonathan Trueman and Abi Grant	25 September 2002	608
Jack joins The Pack in excavating the land under an old railway bridge, but a steam shovel called Ned is too clumsy to lower his arm enough while passing under the bridge, and by accident, he knocks the important keystones loose; leading to Thomas almost falling off the tracks. Jack tries to hold the bridge for Thomas’s safety, but it is too heavy and collapses.
139	9	"It's Only Snow"	David Mitton	Teleplay by : James Mason; Story by : David Mitton	26 September 2002	609
Thomas delivers a holiday tree over to a village with Toby's aid. But when his snowplough breaks and demolishes a water tower, Thomas doesn't want to give up.
140	10	"Twin Trouble"	David Mitton	Brian Trueman	27 September 2002	610
Donald and Douglas end up in a feud after an accident and quit working with each other permanently. However, they soon realise how much they need each other after Donald has an accident while working with Duck.
141	11	"The World's Strongest Engine"	David Mitton	Teleplay by : Paul Larson; Story by : David Mitton	30 September 2002	611
Diesel is sent to help with the work at Brendam Docks while Henry is sent for repairs from an accident, much to the steam engines' displeasure. At the prodding of the trucks, Diesel decides to haul them all at once to flaunt his strength. His bragging misfires when he attempts to move the trucks with their brakes on, and has an accident himself.
142	12	"Scaredy Engines"	David Mitton	Teleplay by : Robin Kingsland; Story by : David Mitton	1 October 2002	612
On Halloween, Thomas teases Percy for being scared in the Smelter's Yard; but Duck feels sorry for Percy, and teaches Thomas a lesson by tricking him.
143	13	"Percy and the Haunted Mine"	David Mitton	Teleplay by : Robyn Charteris; Story by : David Mitton	2 October 2002	613
Percy ventures into an abandoned mine and is spooked by the sinking buildings and the proclaimed "naughty gnomes".
144	14	"Middle Engine"	David Mitton	Teleplay by : Brian Trueman; Story by : David Mitton	3 October 2002	614
Percy is made a middle engine by 'Arry and Bert, leading to him being sent through the coal loading ramp and being blamed for it. James tries to convince him that he can outsmart the diesels, but proves himself wrong.
145	15	"James and the Red Balloon"	David Mitton	Teleplay by : Jenny McDade; Story by : David Mitton	4 October 2002	615
When Thomas delivers a hot air balloon to the airfield, he and James become worried that it could take away their passengers.
146	16	"Jack Frost"	David Mitton	Teleplay by : Paul Larson; Story by : David Mitton	7 October 2002	616
James and Percy have to deliver coal around the Island to prepare for a big freeze. After Thomas jokes to him about "Scary Jack Frost", Percy gets scared while James is not convinced.
147	17	"Gordon Takes a Tumble"	David Mitton	Teleplay by : Robin Kingsland; Story by : David Mitton	8 October 2002 (Note: This episode was first released on The Fogman and other Stories VHS/DVD on 7 October 2002.)	617
Gordon does not feel that it would be dignified for an express engine to pull goods trains, but when Salty teases him and Gordon is assigned to deliver a goods train, Gordon is determined to show Salty how an express engine pulls trucks, only to skid off the tracks.
148	18	"Percy's Chocolate Crunch"	David Mitton	Teleplay by : Brian Trueman; Story by : David Mitton	9 October 2002	618
When a water shortage restricts all engines to one washdown per day, Percy is especially upset by this, as he has all the dirty jobs. He desperately tries to stay clean, but gets dirtier everywhere he goes, frustrating him further. This comes to a head when he takes an accidental journey through Mr. Jolly's Chocolate Factory.
149	19	"Buffer Bother"	David Mitton	Ross Hastings	10 October 2002	619
Ben gets new buffers, making Bill feel jealous; putting his responsibility and reliability aside.
150	20	"Toby Had a Little Lamb"	David Mitton	Jenny McDade	11 October 2002	620
During the winter, Toby is flagged down by a farmer who needs a vet to examine his lambs on the other side of the hill. Duck tries to clear away the snow, but it becomes too thick for him to plough.
151	21	"Thomas, Percy and the Squeak"	David Mitton	Teleplay by : Jenny McDade; Story by : David Mitton	14 October 2002	621
Sir Topham Hatt chooses Thomas to collect the famous Italian opera singer Allicia Botti from the docks, leaving aside dirty Percy, who is a "Guaranteed Connection". However, Thomas' pride soon goes away once Allicia Botti screams at the sight of a mouse in Clarabel.
152	22	"Thomas the Jet Engine"	David Mitton	Teleplay by : Ross Hastings; Story by : David Mitton	15 October 2002	622
152	22	"Thomas and the Jet Engine"	David Mitton	Teleplay by : Ross Hastings; Story by : David Mitton	15 October 2002	622
Gordon boasts to everyone that he is the fastest engine on Sodor, but when Thomas is sent on a wild hayride after a jet engine he is made to deliver is accidentally turned on by Cranky, he ends up having the last laugh.
153	23	"Edward the Very Useful Engine" (Note: Also titled "Edward the Really Useful Engine" for Half-Hour Series 9 broadcasts and the Mud Glorious Mud DVD.)	David Mitton	David Mitton	16 October 2002	623
Gordon believes that Edward is too old, but when he gets stuck on his hill, Edward proves how useful he can be.
154	24	"Dunkin Duncan"	David Mitton	Teleplay by : Jenny McDade; Story by : Simon Nicholson	17 October 2002	624
Impatient Duncan wants Rusty, Rheneas and Skarloey to work faster at the incline, but they instead stick to the railway rules. Duncan attempts to show off how fast he can work to the other engines, but his carelessness leads him to take a plunge in a mud bath.
155	25	"Rusty Saves the Day"	David Mitton	Teleplay by : Paul Larson; Story by : David Mitton	18 October 2002	625
Rheneas and Skarloey's old line is too battered for them to run on, and Sir Topham Hatt is left with no choice but to shut it down and send them to join Rusty at the quarry. However, when the quarry is temporarily closed for rock-blasting, Rusty offers to use the time frame to repair Rheneas and Skarloey's line and deem it fit for reopening.
156	26	"Faulty Whistles"	David Mitton	Teleplay by : Ross Hastings; Story by : David Mitton	21 October 2002	626
When Peter Sam accidentally gets his whistle knocked off by a branch and is barred from working until he gets a new one, Duncan teases him and boasts that any proper engine has a whistle. He soon learns his lesson when his own whistle comes off while delivering an organ.

== Home video releases ==
=== United Kingdom ===
Series 6 was released on VHS and DVD in the UK by Video Collection International in three volumes. They were released in their original widescreen ratio on DVD, however, The Chocolate Crunch was released in fullscreen on both formats.

DVD title	Release date	Included episodes
The Fogman and Other Stories	7 October 2002	"The Fogman"; "No Sleep for Cranky"; "Salty's Secret"; "Harvey to the Rescue"; "A Bad Day for Harold the Helicopter"; "Elizabeth the Vintage Lorry"; "Twin Trouble"; "Gordon Takes a Tumble"
The Chocolate Crunch and Other Stories	24 March 2003	"Percy's Chocolate Crunch"; "Jack Jumps In"; "The World's Strongest Engine"; "Middle Engine"; "Buffer Bother"; "Thomas the Jet Engine"; "Dunkin Duncan"; "Faulty Whistles"
Brave Little Engines	16 June 2003	"A Friend in Need"; "Scaredy Engines"; "Percy and the Haunted Mine"; "James and the Red Balloon"; "Toby Had a Little Lamb"; "Thomas, Percy and the Squeak"; "Edward the Very Useful Engine"; "Rusty Saves the Day"

The only two episodes not released in these volumes are "It's Only Snow" and "Jack Frost", the former of which was included in the Series 7 release Engines to the Rescue.

2 Entertain released a complete series DVD volume in 2007.

Episodes from the series have also made it to various compilation releases with other series.
