= Thomas & Friends series 11 =

Season of television series

Thomas & Friends
- Series 11
- UK DVD cover art
- No. of episodes: 26

Release
- Original network: Nick Jr. (episodes 1-20); Milkshake! (episodes 21-26)
- Original release: 3 September 2007 – 15 January 2008

Series chronology
- ← Previous; Series 10 Next → Series 12

Thomas & Friends is a children's television series about the engines and other characters working on the railways of the Island of Sodor, and is based on The Railway Series books written by Wilbert Awdry.

This article lists and details episodes from the eleventh series of this show, which was first broadcast in September 2007 and ended in January 2008. This series was narrated by Michael Angelis for the UK audiences, while Michael Brandon narrates the episodes for the US audiences.

Starting in this series, the theme song was sung by the children from the Thomas & Friends suite.

Several episodes in this series have two titles: the original titles from the UK broadcasts are shown on top, while the American-adapted titles are shown underneath.

This was Christopher Skala's first series as executive producer.

For the US broadcasts, this was the last series to be distributed by Connecticut Public Television, which distributed the first few episodes. The rest of the episodes from this Series, and from future series, are distributed by WNET in New York City.

The original broadcast version only included 20 episodes; the rest were released on DVD (Engines and Escapades) and then were broadcast on TV months later.

== Production ==
Series 11 was the first in the Series to be filmed in high-definition television format. It was also the last series to be filmed entirely with models and to utilize the resin faces in the closeup shots, as well as human figurines; Series 12 utilized a mix of CGI and models prior to the switch to full CGI animation in series 13.

== Episodes ==
No. overall	No. in series	UK title (top) US title (bottom)	Directed by	Written by	Original release date	Official No.	TV Order
263	1	"Thomas and the Storyteller"	Steve Asquith	Abi Grant	3 September 2007	1109	401a
To prepare for the opening of a new library, Thomas takes a famous storyteller around Sodor so she can think up ideas for a story. However, Thomas is caught up in helping his friends and puts them first.
264	2	"Emily's Rubbish"	Steve Asquith	Wayne Jackman	3 September 2007	1104	401b
264	2	"Emily and the Garbage"	Steve Asquith	Wayne Jackman	3 September 2007	1104	401b
Emily is teased after she works with Whiff, a new tank engine who lives up to his name.
265	3	"Dream On"	Steve Asquith	Neil Richards	4 September 2007	1105	402a
After being bragged at by Spencer, Thomas tries to prove to him that he can be better, but things don't work out for the little blue tank engine.
266	4	"Dirty Work"	Steve Asquith	Wayne Jackman	4 September 2007	1122	402b
James has the job of picking up the Mayor for a festival and is washed for the occasion, but he gets more concerned about staying clean than helping his friends with the dirty jobs.
267	5	"Hector the Horrid!"	Steve Asquith	Simon Spencer	5 September 2007	1108	403a
A new coal hopper truck named Hector has arrived but is rather aggressive to the engines.
268	6	"Gordon and the Engineer"	Steve Asquith	Paul Larson	5 September 2007	1102	403b
268	6	"Gordon and the Mechanic"	Steve Asquith	Paul Larson	5 September 2007	1102	403b
Gordon is made to pick up an important engineer to fix some broken points but gets too impatient and picks up someone completely different; a carpenter. Gordon tries to head back to pick up the engineer, but he is blocked by Donald and Douglas, the Scottish Twins.
269	7	"Thomas and the Spaceship"	Steve Asquith	Sharon Miller	6 September 2007	1107	404a
After Percy sees strange lights in the sky and believes it to be a spaceship. Thomas decides to follow the lights; but at the cost of neglecting the mail run.
270	8	"Henry's Lucky Day"	Steve Asquith	Paul Larson	6 September 2007	1114	404b
Henry believes he has 'lucky trucks' after being able to make all his deliveries on time in the snow. However, they are soon taken by Edward; making Henry lose his confidence.
271	9	"Thomas and the Lighthouse"	Steve Asquith	Abi Grant	7 September 2007	1111	405a
Thomas wants to see the harvest festival fireworks show, but he must deliver a new light bulb first.
272	10	"Thomas and the Big Bang"	Steve Asquith	Abi Grant	7 September 2007	1119	405b
Thomas plays surprise jokes with his new whistle on the narrow gauge engines. Once they start playing jokes with him, it leads to nobody doing any of the work.
273	11	"Smoke and Mirrors"	Steve Asquith	Neil Richards	8 September 2007	1113	406a
A famous magician is coming to perform on Sodor and Thomas is so excited about his grand finale that he rushes his work and does things wrong.
274	12	"Thomas Sets Sail"	Steve Asquith	Sharon Miller	8 September 2007	1103	406b
Thomas is excited to deliver a new sailboat to the mayor, but he soon gets blown away when he doesn't wait for the engineer to lower the mast.
275	13	"Don't Be Silly, Billy"	Steve Asquith	Sharon Miller	9 September 2007	1115	407a
Thomas tries to help a new tank engine named Billy deliver chickens, diesel fuel and coal, but Billy does not want to listen and calls Thomas bossy.
276	14	"Edward and the Mail"	Steve Asquith	Paul Larson	9 September 2007	1118	407b
Edward is asked to take the mail train while Percy is being mended, but he does not want any help to not make himself look silly; as he has never delivered the mail before.
277	15	"Hide and Peep"	Steve Asquith	Simon Spencer	10 September 2007	1101	408a
While waiting for a cargo ship, Thomas and Percy play a game of Hide and Peep; of which Thomas cheats in the game.
278	16	"Toby's Triumph"	Steve Asquith	Abi Grant	10 September 2007	1116	408b
Toby doesn't want to make any mistakes while taking Allicia Botti to a concert, but his worrying ends up with him making mistakes for real.
279	17	"Thomas and the Runaway Car"	Steve Asquith	Sharon Miller	11 September 2007	1117	409a
Thomas is sent on a wild "Hatt Blue" car chase after racing Gordon and not having the flatbed truck with the car attached properly.
280	18	"Thomas in Trouble"	Steve Asquith	Wayne Jackman	11 September 2007	1121	409b
Thomas is impatient about being repaired and puts his job on delivering a choir of children to a concert first; leading to him breaking down.
281	19	"Thomas and the Stinky Cheese"	Steve Asquith	Paul Larson	12 September 2007	1126	410a
Thomas is indignant when 'Arry, Bert and Diesel call him a "stinky steamie". But his determination to prove them wrong gets him into trouble when he is asked to make a delivery of cheese to the docks.
282	20	"Percy and the Left Luggage"	Steve Asquith	Abi Grant	12 September 2007	1124	410b
282	20	"Percy and the Baggage"	Steve Asquith	Abi Grant	12 September 2007	1124	410b
Percy has a busy day ahead – but does forget a very important job till it is almost too late. Percy must work hard to prevent certain disaster.
283	21	"Skarloey Storms Through"	Steve Asquith	Neil Richards	9 January 2008 (Note: This episode was first released on the Engines & Escapades DVD on 22 October 2007.)	1110	502a
Skarloey is scared of thunder and lightning. However, when Peter Sam and Rheneas break down with Farmer McCall's sheep in toe, Skarloey must conquer his fears to help his friends and the sheep.
284	22	"Cool Truckings"	Steve Asquith	Paul Larson	10 January 2008	1105	501b
Duncan teases Madge for being slow, but her boasting leads to her hanging dangerously over a cliff with Duncan on toe.
285	23	"Wash Behind Your Buffers"	Steve Asquith	Paul Larson	11 January 2008	1120	503b
Madge is put in charge of making sure the engines are spic and span for a road show. She puts the engines first to the point she eventually gets dirty herself.
286	24	"Duncan Does It All"	Steve Asquith	Wayne Jackman	13 January 2008	1123	502b
Duncan wants to do exciting jobs, but every time he helps with one of his friend's jobs; he starts another.
287	25	"Sir Handel in Charge"	Steve Asquith	Simon Spencer	14 January 2008	1112	503a
Mr. Percival is running late and places Sir Handel in charge of a special. However, his self-importance leads to him picking the best engines instead of the first ones he sees.
288	26	"Ding-a-Ling"	Steve Asquith	Sharon Miller	15 January 2008	1125	501a
Mr. Percival has ordered a new bike, but it has no bell. Freddie goes off to find a bell for it; but isn't smart enough to know what kind of bell it is.
