= Thomas & Friends series 10 =

Season of television series

Thomas & Friends
- Series 10
- DVD cover art
- No. of episodes: 28

Release
- Original network: Nick Jr.
- Original release: 2 October – 15 October 2006

Series chronology
- ← Previous; Series 9 Next → Series 11

Thomas & Friends is a children's television series about the engines and other characters working on the railways of the Island of Sodor, and is based on The Railway Series books written by Wilbert Awdry. The tenth series was first broadcast in 2006, narrated by Michael Angelis for the UK audiences and by Michael Brandon in the US. Most episodes in this series had different titles in UK and the US.

This was the last series to utilize the instrumental chorus of the Engine Roll Call in the opening sequence. Starting from series 11, the lyrics were incorporated into the theme sequence and sung by children. Starting with this series, all 30-minute episodes included only two mini-episodes.

== Episodes ==
No. overall	No. in series	UK title (top) US title (bottom)	Directed by	Written by	Original release date	Official No.	TV Order
235	1	"Follow That Flour"	Steve Asquith	Sharon Miller	2 October 2006	1003	301a
Thomas decides to play hide and seek with James' flour truck, but the door falls open and all the flour spills and leaves a trail behind him.
236	2	"A Smooth Ride"	Steve Asquith	Simon Nicholson	2 October 2006	1002	301b
Sir Handel starts to rattle and rock as he goes up hills, and does not want to tell Mr. Percival, fearing he will be sent back to the quarry. So he secretly has his friends help him.
237	3	"Thomas and the Jet Plane"	Steve Asquith	Abi Grant	3 October 2006	1001	302a
Thomas grows jealous of a jet plane named Jeremy, who can fly in the sky and see everything at once.
238	4	"Percy and the Funfair"	Steve Asquith	Abi Grant	3 October 2006	1004	302b
238	4	"Percy and the Carnival"	Steve Asquith	Abi Grant	3 October 2006	1004	302b
A funfair has come to town and the engines are helping with the preparations, but Percy's job is to deliver coal. He soon discovers that his job is the most important of all.
239	5	"The Green Controller"	Steve Asquith	Sharon Miller	4 October 2006	1026	303a
When Sir Topham loses his voice, Lady Hatt gives Percy the job of telling the engines what to do. Percy soon forgets which engine has which job, leading to chaos.
240	6	"Duncan Drops a Clanger"	Steve Asquith	Paul Larson	4 October 2006	1005	303b
Duncan is taking a clock tower's bell to be polished, but the chiming distracts him on his journey, and he ignores the other Narrow Gauge engines' warnings about going slowly with it.
241	7	"Thomas' Tricky Tree"	Steve Asquith	Sharon Miller	5 October 2006	1007	304a
Thomas is assigned to collect a Christmas tree from the Wharf. When Duncan teases him, Thomas attempts to prove to the other narrow gauge engines that he isn't silly but soon learns his lesson.
242	8	"Toby's Afternoon Off"	Steve Asquith	Marc Seal	5 October 2006	1006	304b
Toby wants to spend his afternoon off at Farmer McColl's farm to see the animals, but Sir Topham Hatt gives him three “very special” jobs to do. On each of his jobs, Toby wants another engine to help him, but they rush off to do other things. At Brendam Docks, however, Cranky informs him that the cargo he is to unload is on a ship stuck at sea. Toby eagerly hurries back to spend the rest of the day at McColl’s Farm, but comes across Henry, who has broken down and was being helped by Salty, Thomas, and Mavis. Toby thinks about how helping a friend is important and sacrifices his afternoon at the farm to return Henry’s coaches to Knapford station.
243	9	"It's Good to Be Gordon"	Steve Asquith	Abi Grant	6 October 2006	1008	305a
Gordon is close to setting a new record. He unknowingly uses Henry's special coal and it's not until he sees a rather sick Henry on what actually happened.
244	10	"Seeing the Sights"	Steve Asquith	Wayne Jackman	6 October 2006	1014	305b
Thomas is determined to show the tourists as many sights as possible, but he goes so quickly that he goes out without passengers at several stops.
245	11	"Fearless Freddie"	Steve Asquith	Simon Nicholson	7 October 2006	1011	306a
An old narrow gauge tank engine named "Fearless" Freddie returns and challenges Rheneas and Skarloey to a race. But when he sees he is not as fast as he once was, he cheats.
246	12	"Toby's New Shed"	Steve Asquith	Simon Nicholson	7 October 2006	1017	306b
It is a wet and windy day on the Island of Sodor and Thomas offers to help repair Toby's holey roof. However, he is not aware that Toby liked the holes, for the birds would build their nests and keep him company.
247	13	"Big Strong Henry"	Steve Asquith	Simon Nicholson	8 October 2006	1013	307a
Henry wants to prove he is as strong as Gordon by pulling as many trucks as possible, but he only gets in a wreck when he takes the trucks of haybales that were meant for Gordon.
248	14	"Sticky Toffee Thomas"	Steve Asquith	Paul Larson	8 October 2006	1012	307b
248	14	"Sticky Taffy Thomas"	Steve Asquith	Paul Larson	8 October 2006	1012	307b
Thomas spends so much time daydreaming about what he will wear to a costume party that he winds up taking a tanker full of toffee and soon crashes it by mistake.
249	15	"Which Way Now?"	Steve Asquith	James Mason	9 October 2006	1016	308a
Rusty rushes the workmen putting up signs to meet Sir Topham Hatt. However, because they were rushed, all the signs point in the wrong directions.
250	16	"Thomas and the Shooting Star"	Steve Asquith	Abi Grant	9 October 2006	1015	308b
When a shooting star is due to appear and the power company's generator breaks, Thomas takes longer routes to still see the star. But it gets too late and dark, he gets lost.
251	17	"Edward Strikes Out"	Steve Asquith	Sharon Miller	10 October 2006	1018	309a
Gordon and Edward think a new crane called Rocky is useless without an engine. But when Edward's load of pipes spills and causes Gordon to crash, Rocky has a chance to prove his worth.
252	18	"Topped Off Thomas"	Steve Asquith	Sharon Miller	10 October 2006	1010	309b
During a race with Spencer, Thomas accidentally blows Sir Topham's top hat away. To make up for it, he tries to chase the wind as it carries it across the Island.
253	19	"Wharf and Peace"	Steve Asquith	Abi Grant	11 October 2006	1020	310a
After Skarloey is startled at the Wharf, he is convinced that he is a "scaredy engine". He spends the day sad but shows bravery by not especially doing his best.
254	20	"Thomas' Frosty Friend"	Steve Asquith	Sharon Miller	11 October 2006	1019	310b
Thomas sees the children surrounding a giant snowman balloon, but the wind causes it to blow away, and its cords get caught on Thomas' buffers, making him wonder why it won't stop following him.
255	21	"Emily and the Special Coaches"	Steve Asquith	James Mason	12 October 2006	1009	311a
255	21	"Emily and the Special Cars"	Steve Asquith	James Mason	12 October 2006	1009	311a
Emily is collecting a couple new passenger coaches for Gordon who broke a speed express record, but she gets into an argument with Diesel on the way. So Diesel gets the coaches and makes Emily chase him down.
256	22	"Thomas and the Colours"	Steve Asquith	Marc Seal	12 October 2006	1021	311b
256	22	"Thomas and the Colors"	Steve Asquith	Marc Seal	12 October 2006	1021	311b
Thomas is jealous of James, who is taking the Sodor football team for the second year in a row. His attempts to sabotage James' role soon backfire.
257	23	"Thomas and the Birthday Mail"	Steve Asquith	James Mason	13 October 2006	1023	312a
During a summer storm on Sodor, Thomas must brave an avalanche to make a special trip to High Farm to deliver presents and mail to a girl called Alice, with unexpected help from Rosie.
258	24	"Duncan's Bluff"	Steve Asquith	Paul Larson	13 October 2006	1024	312b
Duncan bets James that he can deliver coal faster than James can bring it to the Wharf. But when Duncan realizes he is too small, he cheats and hides the leftover trucks.
259	25	"Missing Trucks"	Steve Asquith	Wayne Jackman	14 October 2006	1022	313a
259	25	"Missing Cars" (Note: Also titled "Missing Freight Cars" in the U.S. for Mud Glorious Mud.)	Steve Asquith	Wayne Jackman	14 October 2006	1022	313a
Rheneas tries to surprise his brother Skarloey who is feeling sad by taking his trucks for him. But he goes off without them for too long, and they go missing, making Skarloey sadder.
260	26	"Thomas and the Treasure"	Steve Asquith	Marc Seal	14 October 2006	1025	313b
Thomas is determined to find the treasure that Salty spoke of, despite the other engines ridiculing him, but he chooses to skip his job to search.
261	27	"James the Second Best"	Steve Asquith	Paul Larson	15 October 2006	1027	314a
James is jealous of Edward when he is chosen to be the poster engine. Determined to prove himself better than Edward, James winds up being careless with his work.
262	28	"Thomas and Skarloey's Big Day Out"	Steve Asquith	Paul Larson	15 October 2006	1028	314b
Thomas decides to cheer Skarloey up by taking him on a tour of the island. However, nothing seems to be impressing Skarloey.
