= Salty's Lighthouse =

- Genre: Animated; Fantasy; Children's
- Created by: Nina I. Hahn (show concept); Robert D. Cardona (original Tugs footage and Tugs characters); David Mitton (original Tugs characters; uncredited)
- Developed by: Nina I. Hahn; Ellen Schecter
- Written by: Barry Harman (Salty/Tugs segments/lyrics); Ricky Harman (Salty segments); Donna Harman (Salty segments); Steve Edelman (Salty segments); Scott Guy (Salty segments); Mark Stratton (Salty segments); David Bucs (Salty segments); George Arthur Bloom (Tugs segments); Brian Meehl (Tugs segments); Noel MacNeal (Tugs segments); Ronnie Krauss (Tugs segments)
- Directed by: David Mitton (TUGS segments; uncredited); Chris Tulloch (TUGS segments; uncredited); David Bucs (animation art); Bill Hutten (animation/timing); Jeff Hall (animation/timing); Dora Case (animation); Sue Peters (animation); Carole Beers (animation/timing); Terry Klassen (voice); Gail Fabrey (assistant); Charles J.K. Choi (supervising); Chris Cho (technology); Oon Heung Yo (B.G.)
- Voices of: Kathleen Barr; Ian James Corlett; Paul Dobson; Rhys Huber; Janyse Jaud; Andrea Libman; Scott McNeil; French Tickner; Lenore Zann
- Theme music composer: Chase Rucker
- Country of origin: United States
- Original language: English
- No. of episodes: 40

Production
- Executive producers: Joe Bacal; Tom Griffin; C.J. Kettler; Carole Weitzman
- Producer: Mark Stratton
- Running time: 11 minutes (segments); 22 minutes (episodes)
- Production company: Sunbow Entertainment

Original release
- Network: Public television Syndication (1997); TLC (1998)
- Release: October 3, 1997 – June 26, 1998

Related
- Tugs

Salty's Lighthouse is an animated television series for preschoolers, produced by Sunbow Entertainment in association with the Bank Street College of Education in New York. Debuting in syndication in late 1997, and picked up by Discovery Communications for U.S. broadcast that December, it aired from March 30 to June 26, 1998 on TLC's Ready Set Learn! block.

The show centers on a young boy named Salty, as he plays and learns with his friends in a magical lighthouse. As well as the animated adventures of Salty and his friends, the series uses live-action footage from the British children's television series Tugs for various segments. 40 episodes were produced in the series.

== Premise ==
Salty is a young redheaded boy who loves using his imagination. Each day, he goes to the lighthouse near his home to play with his seaside friends: Ocho, the octopus; Claude, the hermit crab; Sophie and Sadie, the twin seagulls; a group of small clams; Aurora, the light that shines over the ocean; and lighthouse owner Aunt Chovie. Through their adventures in each episode, they learn good lessons that help them overcome their problems. Tied into each story are other segments, told through live-action footage:

- Through the eyes of Seymour (a walking pair of binoculars), the characters look out beyond the lighthouse to see what the tugboats in the harbour are doing. Their stories relate to the situations of the main characters. The tugboat footage consists of live model animation, taken from the British television series Tugs (see below for more information).
- Some episodes include a segment called 'Salty's Song Time' introduced by the lighthouse clock. These consist of original songs, which relate the lesson of the episode. The songs are set to an arrangement of footage, mainly from archival libraries and silent films including Charlie Chaplin, Commando Cody & specially added animation for some scenes in the songs.

== Voice cast ==
- Rhys Huber as Salty
- Kathleen Barr as Ocho and Aunt Chovie
- Andrea Libman as Claude
- Janyse Jaud as Sophie and Sadie
- Lenore Zann as
  - Aurora
  - Sunshine
  - Captain Star
  - Lillie Lightship
  - Little Ditcher
  - and Sally Seaplane
- Ian James Corlett as
  - Ten Cents
  - Otis
  - Zeebee
  - Zip
  - Lord Stinker
  - Frank
  - Eddie
  - and Lighthouse Clock
- Paul Dobson as
  - Big Stack
  - Hercules
  - Captain Zero
  - Izzy Gomez
  - Sea Rogue
  - Billy Shoepack
  - Mr. Boffo
  - Mr. Socko
  - Cappy
  - Tramper
  - Old Rusty
  - Scoop
  - O. Krappenschmitt
  - Stoney
  - and Chooch
- French Tickner as
  - Top Hat
  - Warrior
  - Grampus
  - Steamer
  - and Scuttlebutt Pete
- Scott McNeil as
  - Zorran
  - Zak
  - Zug
  - Bluenose
  - Boomer
  - and the Fultan Ferry

== Episodes ==
No.	Title	Original release date
1	"Mixed Signals!"	October 3, 1997
2	"Too Young to Be Included!"	October 10, 1997
3	"Taking Off!"	October 17, 1997
4	"Let's Party!"	October 24, 1997
5	"Blackout"	October 31, 1997
6	"Eight Is Too Much"	November 7, 1997
7	"One Bad Day"	November 14, 1997
8	"Hands Off!"	November 21, 1997
9	"Salty, Come Lately!"	November 28, 1997
10	"It's Magic"	December 5, 1997
11	"Count on Me"	December 12, 1997
12	"Knot So Nice"	December 19, 1997
13	"Taking My Turn"	December 26, 1997
14	"Backwards Day"	January 2, 1998
15	"Banana Splits"	January 9, 1998
16	"Clear the Decks"	January 16, 1998
17	"Claude in Charge"	January 23, 1998
18	"The Favorite"	January 30, 1998
19	"Strike Up the Band"	February 6, 1998
20	"Blankety Blank"	February 13, 1998
21	"The Last of the Red Hot Seagulls"	February 20, 1998
22	"Farley Frog"	February 27, 1998
23	"Boss Man"	March 6, 1998
24	"Sophie, Come Home!"	March 13, 1998
25	"Who Took My Crayons?"	March 20, 1998
26	"High Spirits!"	March 27, 1998
27	"Some Guys Have All the Luck!"	April 3, 1998
28	"Dream On!"	April 10, 1998
29	"Sound Off"	April 17, 1998
30	"Treasure Hunt"	April 24, 1998
31	"Who Turned Off the Lights?"	May 1, 1998
32	"If the Clue Fits, Wear It!"	May 8, 1998
33	"Desperately Seeking Sadie"	May 14, 1998
34	"Colossal Crab"	May 15, 1998
35	"The Big Birthday Splash"	May 22, 1998
36	"Stop the Music!"	May 29, 1998
37	"Let's Wing It!"	June 5, 1998
38	"No Strings Attached!"	June 12, 1998
39	"Guilty Gull"	June 19, 1998
40	"Bivalve Blues"	June 26, 1998

== Home Video releases ==
=== United States ===
In 1999, Interactive Learning Group (under license from Sunbow and Sony Wonder) released three VHS tapes containing two episodes each (1 full episode) for their Video Buddy Interactive System.

In 2012, episodes were available online on Kidobi, a video streaming site for preschool content.

=== United Kingdom ===
In November 2000, Maverick released a VHS tape of the series containing six episodes (3 full episodes).

In 2005, Metrodome Distribution (a distributor owned by Sunbow's then-parent TV-Loonland AG) released a compilation VHS/DVD called "Toddler Time!", which included the two episodes 'Taking Off' and 'Let's Party' (making one full episode).

== Comparisons with Tugs ==
The segments featuring the tugboats in the harbour used footage from the British television series Tugs, the sister series to Thomas the Tank Engine and Friends produced in 1989 by Britt Allcroft, Robert D. Cardona and David Mitton. Whilst Allcroft drove the Thomas series to popularity among North American audiences (through the PBS series Shining Time Station), Tugs did not spread far beyond its country of origin, lasting one season of 13 episodes due to the bankruptcy of its distributor, TVS Television (although it was aired and merchandised in the Japanese and Australian markets).

As a result of this, Sunbow saw fit to use the series' animation as a part of Salty's Lighthouse, licensing the use of the footage from Cardona. However, they repurposed the footage drastically to suit the needs of the show's pre-school audience. (Cardona was not involved in the show's production; however, he was credited as the creator of the model footage.)

The original episodes of Tugs centered on two rival fleets of tugboats, working in 'Bigg City Port' in the 1920s, with its plotlines involving action and drama intended for an audience of older children. Due to the difference in the intended demographic, the original plotlines (as well as the premise of rival tug fleets) were not used. Instead, the producers of Salty's Lighthouse wrote entirely new stories of the boats in 'Snugboat Harbor', relating to the theme of the main animated segment, with footage from the series edited and re-dubbed to tell these stories.

(This creates an interesting comparison to the Thomas segments of Shining Time Station; as Britt Allcroft intended to introduce Thomas to North America through that series, so the UK terms used in that series (i.e. trucks) were modified to reflect the U.S. terms, but the episodes were still faithful to their source. In the case of Salty's Lighthouse, the show was completely repurposed for a new market, instead of attempting to create a faithful 'equivalent' of Tugs.)

Along with the newly created stories, various changes were made to the characters featured in them. The characters of Sunshine, Captain Star (the narrator), and Little Ditcher were made female, presumably to appeal to a wider audience. (Sunshine was referred to in some episodes as fellow switcher Ten Cents' sister.)

The U.S. accents of the new voiceover replaced a range of British accents from the original characters (for example, the Glaswegian Scottish of Big Mac, or the Cockney accents of Ten Cents and Zorran).

Some character names were also changed, mostly to avoid confusion with others of the same name: Of the main characters, Big Mac became “Big Stack”, possibly to avoid legal trouble from McDonald's over the name of their well-known burger, O.J. became “Otis” to avoid association with O. J. Simpson or the fact that O.J. are the initials for orange juice. Zebedee became 'Zeebee' although his original nameplate is left uncensored possibly from mispronouncing it.

Izzy Gomez had an American accent instead of a Mexican one, despite sporting a sombrero. This was to avoid offensive stereotypes.

The Fultan Ferry was given a voice (despite not having a visible face or megaphone), and was confirmed as a male character. He also went under the name 'Fultan' by Grampus.

Excluding the human characters, most of the faceless characters (such as Little Ditcher, Scuttlebutt Pete, and Puffa) do not speak through their visible megaphones (with the exception of Tramper (Nantucket) in "Salty Come Lately").

Many supporting and incidental characters were also repurposed, to fit particular Salty's Lighthouse stories:

- Johnny Cuba (a smuggler) was written as 'Steamer', a friendly character.
- Sea Rogue was used as a villain, stealing cargo and only appearing in a dream of Top Hat's.
- Two different characters (Coast Guard and the Coast Guard's Messenger) were merged into a single character named 'Cappy'.
- Puffa became "The Train" or "Chooch".
- Jack the Grappler became 'Scoop'.
- The scrap dealers (Burke and Blair) became movie producers named 'Mr. Boffo' and 'Mr. Socko'.
- Nantucket went under the name 'Tramper', and also became a friendly character. Sometimes he appeared in speaking parts, and sometimes only communicated through a foghorn.
- The Quarry Master gained the name 'Stoney'.

Some of the other characters (such as the Fire Tug, Big Mickey, Mighty Mo, Pearl, the Shrimpers, and the Buoys) do make several appearances, but have no dialogue, whilst others, such as Sea Rogue's Uncle and the Pirates (a.k.a. The Green-Eyed Things) never made any appearances (although Sea Rogue's Uncle did make a cameo appearance in the episode "Who Took My Crayons?", and one of the Pirates was shown in the place of Sea Rogue when he covered Lillie Lightship and a bell buoy with a blanket in the episode "Dream On").

== See also ==
- Tugs, the British series made into a segment of the show
- Thomas & Friends, and its U.S. counterpart Shining Time Station
- Theodore Tugboat, a Canadian children's series, also starring tugboat characters
