= Thomas & Friends series 9 =

Season of television series

Thomas & Friends
- Series 9
- DVD cover art
- No. of episodes: 26

Release
- Original network: Nick Jr.
- Original release: 31 October – 12 November 2005

Series chronology
- ← Previous; Series 8 Next → Series 10

Thomas & Friends is a children's television series about the railways of the Island of Sodor, based on The Railway Series books written by Wilbert Awdry.

This article lists and details episodes from the ninth series of the show, which was first broadcast in 2005. There were 26 episodes in the series, preceded by Thomas & Friends: Calling All Engines!. This series was narrated by Michael Angelis for the United Kingdom audiences, while Michael Brandon narrated the episodes for the United States audiences.

== Episodes ==
No. overall	No. in series	UK title (top) US title (bottom)	Directed by	Written by	Original release date	Official No.	TV Order
209	1	"Percy and the Oil Painting"	Steve Asquith	Abi Grant	31 October 2005	906	201a
Percy shows a famous artist around Sodor to inspire his next painting, "The Spirit of Sodor", but the famous artist does not think any of Percy's places are special.
210	2	"Thomas and the Rainbow"	Steve Asquith	Abi Grant	31 October 2005	901	201b
Thomas sees a rainbow in the sky when he is assigned to collect engineers to repair the telephone lines. Although, he neglects his job trying to find the "special thing" at the end of the rainbow and soon finds himself in danger. After he is rescued and returns to Tidmouth Sheds, it turns out to be where the end of the rainbow is and he realizes his friends are the most special thing of all.
211	3	"Thomas' Milkshake Muddle"	Steve Asquith	Marc Seal	1 November 2005	905	202a
Thomas has to take milk churns for cakes and ice cream to the bakery, but he completely forgets about going slowly as he speeds past Emily, making it almost butter. He then has to go back for more milk trucks. However, he makes up for his mistake by later taking the original trucks instead of going all the way to fetch the butter. He goes as fast as possible, which makes the milk into butter and saves the day.
212	4	"Mighty Mac"	Steve Asquith	Paul Larson	1 November 2005	904	202b
A new double-ended engine called Mighty and Mac (Mighty Mac) arrives on the Skarloey Railway. They argue about their path on the way to the campsite and wind up lost. After the passenger carriage comes off the rails and the passengers work together to get it back on the rails, Mighty and Mac learn that it's best to work together.
213	5	"Molly's Special Special"	Steve Asquith	Paul Larson	2 November 2005	903	203a
To help a new yellow mixed-traffic tender engine named Molly feel special, Thomas has her empty trucks covered and decorated with lanterns to make the others think she is pulling a very important load.
214	6	"Respect for Gordon"	Steve Asquith	James Mason	2 November 2005	902	203b
Gordon demands respect from the other engines after they teased him for his rattling firebox. However, this ends up in a rather sticky situation.
215	7	"Thomas and the Birthday Picnic"	Steve Asquith	Sharon Miller	3 November 2005	907	204a
Thomas is given the job of taking the Hatts (Sir Topham, Lady, and Dowager) for a birthday picnic, but his ideas for picnic spots do not work out.
216	8	"Tuneful Toots"	Steve Asquith	Sharon Miller	3 November 2005	910	204b
Rusty is excited about taking the brass band on a tour of the Island before a big concert. But because they has so much fun, they wind up going too far and running out of diesel oil.
217	9	"Thomas and the Toy Shop"	Steve Asquith	James Mason	4 November 2005	918	205a
217	9	"Thomas and the Toy Workshop" (Note: Its titular DVD)	Steve Asquith	James Mason	4 November 2005	918	205a
Thomas attempts to prove to his friends that he can handle all the work when a new toy shop is being opened for the winter holidays when the other engines are held up.
218	10	"Rheneas and the Dinosaur"	Steve Asquith	Paul Larson	4 November 2005	912	205b
When a dinosaur skeleton is discovered, Skarloey and Rheneas want to deliver it. But Skarloey is not careful enough, so Rheneas sets out to pull the dinosaur alone. However, he fails to pull it up the hill, and when Skarloey comes along, Rheneas apologizes for wanting to work alone, and Skarloey helps him the rest of the way.
219	11	"Thomas and the New Engine"	Steve Asquith	Marc Seal	5 November 2005	914	206a
The other engines spread rumours about a new diesel-like tender engine called Neville, but when he gets in trouble with Annie and Clarabel on a broken bridge, Thomas must come to his rescue.
220	12	"Toby Feels Left Out"	Steve Asquith	Simon A. Brown	5 November 2005	908	206b
The engines are all getting repaints for the grand opening of a museum – all except Toby, who is now under the belief that he is being put in the museum.
221	13	"Thomas Tries His Best"	Steve Asquith	James Mason	6 November 2005	920	207a
The fair has come to Sodor but Thomas is unhappy that he has to help out Farmer McColl and his chickens, and tries to do the job quickly.
222	14	"The Magic Lamp"	Steve Asquith	Sharon Miller	6 November 2005	917	207b
Peter Sam thinks Skarloey's story about Proteus and his magic lamp is rubbish until he encounters some of the clues from the story.
223	15	"Thomas and the Statue"	Steve Asquith	Marc Seal	7 November 2005	923	208a
When a statue to represent the Sodor Railway arrives, Thomas thinks it is of himself, and his newly enlarged ego aggravates the other engines. Luckily, the statue reveals to be the entire railway crew on it.
224	16	"Henry and the Flagpole"	Steve Asquith	Paul Larson	7 November 2005	913	208b
When Salty accidentally runs over the flagpole that Henry was supposed to deliver, the big green engine fears that his favourite tree will be used for the flagpole instead. However, Henry saves the day by instead using a mast from an old ship at Brendam Docks.
225	17	"Emily Knows Best"	Steve Asquith	Marc Seal	8 November 2005	915	209a
Emily wants to be a queen, so she tells Percy what to do, much to Toby's dismay. This soon leads to disaster when Percy uses Emily's track. A chain-reaction collision occurs when Percy's trucks crash into Mavis and her trucks, which in turn knock over a telephone pole that later derails Toby. After Emily goes to get help and is reprimanded, she decides it's best to leave the decisions to a real king or queen — or Toby.
226	18	"Thomas' Day Off"	Steve Asquith	Sharon Miller	8 November 2005	922	209b
A new diesel named Dennis is made to take over Thomas' duties for the day, but after Thomas helps him once, he realizes he can make Thomas do all the work for him. When Dennis has to pull a load of roof tile trucks, he pretends to be overheating, so Thomas looks for another engine to do the work. Dennis, wanting to avoid the work at all costs, speeds away to make sure he doesn't have to do the work, but derails and falls into a marshy area.
227	19	"Thomas' New Trucks"	Steve Asquith	Paul Larson	9 November 2005	916	210a
Thomas wants to keep his new trucks clean after James claims he will have the cleanest trucks. Not wanting to get them dirty, he uses his old ones; but soon learns his mistake. James teases him again when he arrives at the docks, but Thomas gets the last laugh when Cranky drops a crate of melons over James, dirtying him and his trucks.
228	20	"Duncan and the Old Mine"	Steve Asquith	James Mason	9 November 2005	921	210b
Duncan is desperate for adventure, so he heads down a disused track. It leads to a mineshaft, and he accidentally knocks its roof down due to his tall funnel as he enters, trapping himself.
229	21	"Bold and Brave"	Steve Asquith	James Mason	10 November 2005	909	211a
Diesel warns Thomas of the "Curse of the Cliffs", just before he is supposed to cross the cliff.
230	22	"Skarloey the Brave"	Steve Asquith	Paul Larson	10 November 2005	925	211b
Skarloey runs away when some trucks rampage down the incline. Wanting to prove himself that he is brave, he goes up the incline.
231	23	"Saving Edward"	Steve Asquith	James Mason	11 November 2005	919	212a
Edward starts to wheeze steam when he works, and fears that Sir Topham Hatt will scrap him. Thomas tries to cover for him, but it just makes the situation worse.
232	24	"Thomas and the Golden Eagle"	Steve Asquith	Abi Grant	11 November 2005	926	212b
Thomas sacrifices his chances to see one of Sodor's rarest birds to help Percy when he breaks down after offering to do Thomas' work as well as his own.
233	25	"Keeping Up with James"	Steve Asquith	Abi Grant	12 November 2005	924	213a
James and Edward are working together to deliver coal during the winter holidays, but James wants to finish the job first so he can pull the presents train. Edward warns James about taking care on the icy rails several times after James skids, but he doesn't listen. After a derailing, James learns it's best to be careful like Edward, and convinces Sir Topham Hatt to let him be Edward's back engine for the presents train.
234	26	"Flour Power"	Steve Asquith	Abi Grant	12 November 2005	911	213b
On Halloween, Thomas has to work with Diesel; who teases him every chance he gets. Thomas pays Diesel out by putting himself under the flour chute and becoming a ghostly white. Diesel is scared and runs away quickly, leaving Thomas to take all the trucks alone. This proves to his advantage, as Thomas realizes on his return journey that all the things Diesel made sound scary are just normal things: an owl, an old door, and Henry's forest. When he returns with the flour, Sir Topham Hatt calls him a Really Useful Engine and sends him for a washdown.
