= List of Tugs books =

This is a list of books based on the British children's television series Tugs. Starting from 1989 to 1992, books based on the series were released in the United Kingdom, Australia and Japan and by different publishers and authors.

== Annuals ==
Two annuals were released in 1989 and 1990. Both containing four stories and numerous activities and published by Grandreams Limited.

=== 1989 annual ===
- Loading Grain
- Mistaken Identity
- The Race
- The Missing Barge

=== 1990 annual ===
- Heat Wave
- Ship in Distress
- Naval Manoeuvers
- Quarantine

== Buzz books ==
The Buzz books were part of the children's Buzz book series released in 1990 by Reed Children's Books. Each story, unlike other Buzz books based on episodes from the television show, was original and takes place after the television series. Each was written by Fiona Hardwick and illustrated by The County Studio. In total four were released, listed in numerical order:

1. Kidnapped - ISBN 1-85591-012-8
2. Run Aground - ISBN 1-85591-013-6
3. Nothing to Declare - ISBN 1-85591-014-4
4. Treasure Hunt - ISBN 1-85591-015-2

According to the Bigg City Port Tripod website, there was supposed to be a fifth Buzz Book called Sunk. However no copies have been found and its authenticity and plot are unknown.

== Photo books ==
The photo books were based on each individual episode with few differences to the original story and some deleted scenes that were in the original television broadcasts than the video releases. The books were released by Heinemann and included pictures of scenes from the episodes. Few kept their original title of the episode whilst few had a different name. They are as listed:

- Sunshine
- Pirate
- Trapped
- High Winds
- Ghost Fleet (based on the episode Ghosts)
- The Unlucky Tug (based on the episode Jinxed)
- Warrior's Longest Day (based on the episode Warrior)
- Up River
- High Tide
- Bigg City Freeze (based on the episode Bigg Freeze)

== Sticker books ==
The sticker books were based on the episodes but had major differences from the corresponding episode. They were published by Heinemann. Each was written by Penny Morris and had numerous stickers, which the reader was to place on certain parts of the pages. The ones released are:

- Regatta - ISBN 0-434-94953-1
- OJ's Bad Day - ISBN 0-434-94956-6 (based on the episode Quarantine)

== Other books ==
These are individual books that don't belong in a series.

=== Ten Cents' Busy Day ===
Ten Cents' Busy Day
- Author: Fiona Hardwick
- Language: English
- Publisher: Heinemann
- Publication date: 1990
- Publication place: Britain
- ISBN: 0-434-97431-5

Ten Cents' Busy Day is a hardback book released in 1990, written by Fiona Hardwick and published by Heinemann. The story revolves around Ten Cents who does jobs around Bigg City, and his interactions with other characters.
