= Clearwater Features =

British film production company

Clearwater Features Ltd
- Hand-painted logo of Clearwater Features
- Type: Privately held company
- Industry: Entertainment; children's programming
- Founded: 1979
- Defunct: 31 December 1990
- Fate: Ceased operations; later acquired by Britt Allcroft
- Successor: The Britt Allcroft Company
- Products: Thomas the Tank Engine & Friends; Tugs

Clearwater Features Ltd. was a British film production company (based first in Battersea, then at Shepperton Studios) that produced the first two series of the children's television series Thomas the Tank Engine & Friends from 1984 to 1986. It is also known for creating the short-lived children's TV series Tugs.

== History ==
The company was founded in 1979 by Gerry Anderson alumni Ken Turner and David Mitton, and produced television commercials as well as miniature effects for films and TV shows. Turner left the company in 1979, to be replaced by American-born director and producer Robert D. Cardona.

The production logo of Clearwater Features was a pink Buick Y-Job car parked at a film studio with palm trees, based on Clearwater, Florida, and it appeared on the ending of half the stories of Thomas the Tank Engine & Friends from series 1 and 2 (the other half ending with a nameboard gallery). It also appeared on a flag of a barge in the Tugs episode "4th of July".

The company shut down on the last day of 1990 because of Tugs' conclusion. When the studio was closed down, Mitton became part of The Britt Allcroft Company and Cardona went off to live in Canada. Thomas the Tank Engine & Friends remained in production by The Britt Allcroft Company (later Gullane Entertainment) from 1984 until 2003, when HIT Entertainment took over.

== Key people ==
- Ken Turner, David Mitton – co-founders
- Robert D. Cardona – co-CEO (1979–1990)
- Mike O'Donnell, Junior Campbell – composers

=== TV series produced ===
- Thomas the Tank Engine & Friends (1984–1986) – created by Wilbert Awdry and developed by Britt Allcroft
- Tugs (1989) – created by David Mitton and Robert D. Cardona

== Periscope lens system ==
The Clearwater Periscope lens system was a type of TV camera developed in 1983 by Clearwater Features for use on the children's television series Thomas the Tank Engine & Friends and Tugs. The cameras were used together with live-action model animation, to produce the image of character movements at eye level. Only two of these camera systems were ever made. The system used for TUGS was later shipped off to Canada and modified for the filming of Theodore Tugboat.
