= Thomas & Friends series 5 =

Season of television series

Thomas & Friends
- Series 5
- DVD cover art
- No. of episodes: 26

Release
- Original network: Cartoon Network UK
- Original release: 14 September – 19 October 1998

Series chronology
- ← Previous; Series 4 Next → Series 6

Thomas the Tank Engine & Friends is a children's television series about the engines and other characters working on the railways of the Island of Sodor, and is based on The Railway Series books written by Wilbert Awdry.

This article lists and details episodes from the fifth series of the show, which was first broadcast in 1998. This series was narrated by Michael Angelis for audiences in the United Kingdom, while Alec Baldwin narrated episodes for audiences in the United States.

In the United States, this season was first aired in 1999 on Fox Family. This was the first season of the series that was not aired on PBS Kids.

This was the last season produced by Gullane Entertainment's original name, The Britt Allcroft Company before its rename in 2000.

== Production ==
=== Writing ===
The show's staff had decided since series 3 that most of the best stories of The Railway Series had been adapted, the rest involving too many new characters or closely resembling previous stories. With Series 5, the decision was made to write a full series of original, staff-written stories. One reason for this was producer Britt Allcroft's desire to create a theatrical Thomas the Tank Engine movie. She requested that director David Mitton should show off his modelling skills.

Some inspiration for the stories came from a former LMR manager named David Maidment. In 1997, Maidment met with Steven Wright about the possibility of supporting the Railway Children charity, and while Wright told him the series' staff commonly received such requests, they would consider. During their meeting, Maidment relayed stories about his railway experiences working in South Wales and as the manager at Crewe station. Days later, Maidment received a call asking if he would allow some of his stories to be used as material – the stories from The Railway Series were frequently based on true events, and Allcroft and Mitton preferred this. Maidment agreed, and was also asked to review each story to make sure that the railway in the show operated realistically. As a result, Maidment received writing credit alongside Allcroft and Mitton. 10,000 pounds ($14,406 in U.S. money) was donated to the Railway Children for his work.

These stories are amongst those adapted:

- "A Better View for Gordon" - the Granville-Paris Express ran through the buffer stop, across the station concourse, and crashed through the station wall; landing in the Place de Rennes below.
- "Baa!" – a ram invades a railway station and attacks some vandals; additionally, the idea of a "Best Kept Station" competition.
- "James & the Trouble with Trees" – rain erodes an embankment, causing a tree to slide down and stand upright on the tracks.
- "Double Teething Troubles" – a diesel stalls while banking a train.
- "A Surprise for Percy" - a runaway in the Garw Valley that occurred during David Maidment's time as Area Manager at Bridgend.
- "Busy Going Backwards" - a couple of "hair-raising" runaway trains in the Tondu valleys that occurred during David Maidment's time as Area Manager in South Wales.
- "Gordon & the Gremlin" – bathwater in a luxury coach splashes around the compartment.

The design for each new character would be chosen by David Eves, and given to David Mitton for approval.

=== Filming ===
Mitton shot 2,700 slates for Series 5, the most of any of the series he shot for Thomas, and music from seasons 3 and 4 play while recording the audio to 5.1 surround sound while the final cut uses stereo audio.

The filming for this season lasted from September 1, 1997, to April 30, 1998.

=== Broadcast ===
Previously Thomas had only appeared in the US as a segment on the TV show Shining Time Station, but Series 5 aired in the US as part of the half-hour Storytime with Thomas program. Each episode would include a new Series 5 episode, an episode of Britt Allcroft's Magic Adventures of Mumfie, and an episode from the previous four seasons narrated by George Carlin, with music videos and footage of Day Out with Thomas in between.

== Episodes ==
No. overall	No. in series	UK title (top) US title (bottom)	Directed by	Source	Original release date	Official No.
105	1	"Cranky Bugs"	David Mitton	Original by Britt Allcroft and David Mitton	14 September 1998	501
A tower crane called Cranky causes trouble for Thomas and Percy, calling them "bugs". But one night in a storm, Duck and the big engines are stuck at the docks. Cranky gets knocked over by an old tramp steamer, and needs the engines' help.
106	2	"Horrid Lorry"	David Mitton	Original by Britt Allcroft and David Mitton	15 September 1998	502
When Percy shows up late for work one morning, Cranky loses his patience with the engines not working hard enough and arranges for three snide lorries to arrive, and take over the engines' work. The lorries bully the engines, particularly Percy and Toby, but eventually, the tables are turned, and the lorries wreck themselves and get sent away.
107	3	"A Better View for Gordon"	David Mitton	Original by Britt Allcroft, David Mitton, and David Maidment	16 September 1998	503
Gordon complains that engines like him should have a panoramic view from the back wall of the new Kirk Ronan station. He takes on his first test runs, with empty coaches and he stops at the station just fine. When he takes the coaches for another try, he breaks down before the station. At the grand opening of the new station, his brakes jam and he crashes through the station wall. The last time, it is a success for the 2nd grand opening of the new station, and the relieved Fat Controller tells Gordon that his panoramic view is there to stay.
108	4	"Lady Hatt's Birthday Party"	David Mitton	Original by Britt Allcroft, David Mitton, and David Maidment	17 September 1998	504
It is Lady Hatt's birthday, and her husband Sir Topham is determined to get to her party at the station on time. After his car hits a hole in the road, he gets a ride with Caroline until her engine overheats and breaks down. George takes over, until he loses control and goes into a muddy ditch, resulting in Sir Topham Hatt's suit getting ruined. Finally, he acts as Thomas' fireman, further dirtying his suit, who takes him the rest of the way. When he arrives, Lady Hatt jokes about his ruined suit, saying that she didn't realise the party was "fancy dress".
109	5	"James and the Trouble with Trees"	David Mitton	Original by Britt Allcroft, David Mitton, and David Maidment	18 September 1998	505
James is boastful about his new coat of paint, and he ignores warnings from Henry and Terence about trees that are too close to the tracks. While delivering some Troublesome Trucks during a storm, James comes across an old tree that gets blown onto the tracks in front of him. The tree nearly falls on James, but Thomas rescues him just in time.
110	6	"Gordon and the Gremlin"	David Mitton	Original by Britt Allcroft, David Mitton, and David Maidment	21 September 1998	506
Sir Topham Hatt selects Gordon to give a very important person a tour of the island. However, Gordon's fire does not light and the turntable malfunctions, causing the other engines to believe these problems are caused by gremlins. Gordon disagrees, until he has trouble with Sir Topham Hatt's VIP in his coach.
111	7	"Bye George!"	David Mitton	Original by Britt Allcroft and David Mitton	22 September 1998	507
George is once again up to no good. He bullies Rheneas, Skarloey, and Percy, then tarmacs asphalt over the tracks where later, Thomas derails and ends up crashing through a barn. The next day, George bullies Duck and blocks his way, making Gordon ram Duck's last truck and send it flying into the air. After Sir Tohpam Hatt heard of all these disturbances, he punishes George from rolling for an entire week.
112	8	"Baa!"	David Mitton	Original by Britt Allcroft, David Mitton, and David Maidment	23 September 1998	508
A competition for "The Best Dressed Station" is being held across Sodor. But Percy crosses paths with a hungry ram on his way to help decorate Maithwaite and later, the station's decorations are ravaged when he goes to take a snooze. At first, the ram is blamed for the mess, but three boys confess they made the mess out of boredom and volunteer to clean it up. A few days later, Maithwaite wins first prize, and Sir Topham Hatt gives a pumpkin to the ram. However, Harold's arrival leads to Sir Topham's hat getting blown off and eaten by the ram. Sir Topham then jokes that he wouldn't be able to eat his own hat even if he had to.
113	9	"Put Upon Percy"	David Mitton	Original by Britt Allcroft and David Mitton	24 September 1998	509
Percy is feeling put upon after a hard day's work without rest, and to make matters worse, Thomas laughs at him about it. While working at the coal mine one day, some of the Troublesome Trucks escape from Percy and crash inside the mine, causing it to collapse. Percy escapes backwards and gets trapped under an avalanche, but luckily he is found and rescued. For Percy's bravery, Sir Topham Hatt rewards him with a new coat of paint and Thomas apologises for teasing him.
114	10	"Toby and the Flood"	David Mitton	Original by Britt Allcroft and David Mitton	25 September 1998	510
After weeks of rain, Toby goes to investigate a dam on his branch line. As he is on it, he discovers it's about to break and rushes away. On his way back, the bridge of the river floods away with him on it. Harold and Percy rescue Toby, with Harold securing a rope and Percy pulling him to safety. After the dam is mended, a party is held in Toby's honour.
115	11	"Haunted Henry"	David Mitton	Original by Britt Allcroft and David Mitton	28 September 1998	511
Edward warns Henry of a misty forest and a spooky old station. Henry does not believe Edward until he sees the forest and the station for himself with a goods train. The next night, Henry takes the same Troublesome Trucks into the forest, but the trucks get spooked upon seeing the station and plunge into a deep ravine due to an unsafe viaduct. The ghost is then revealed to be a fogman called Old Bailey. Henry's crew apologises for ignoring Old Bailey's warning about the viaduct, and to thank him, they arrange for him to operate the old station, in exchange for his promise not to spook Henry again.
116	12	"Double Teething Troubles"	David Mitton	Original by Britt Allcroft, David Mitton, and David Maidment	29 September 1998	512
When Bill and Ben argue, a new diesel named Derek with "teething" troubles arrives to help. When Thomas tells Percy about Derek, the misunderstanding about the diesel thinks he has a toothache, and Percy passes this on to the twins. The next day, Derek overheats and breaks down whilst pushing a long train, and the twins must pull him back to the quarry.
117	13	"Stepney Gets Lost"	David Mitton	Original by Britt Allcroft and David Mitton	30 September 1998	513
Stepney takes a break from working with Rusty and goes to work at the quarry with Toby and Mavis. However, after a delivery with a goods train, he gets lost and ends up in the smelter's yard, where diesels called 'Arry and Bert want him for scrap. Fortunately, Sir Topham Hatt finds him and helps him get back home.
118	14	"Toby's Discovery"	David Mitton	Original by Britt Allcroft and David Mitton	1 October 1998	514
Toby is spooked when he stumbles across a disused mine. Thomas' tale of the "Old Warrior" ghost does not help, but Toby finds out that "The Old Warrior" is actually an old narrow gauge engine called Bertram and is given the nickname due to his courageousness.
119	15	"Something in the Air"	David Mitton	Thomas the Tank Engine & Friends magazine story by Andrew Brenner	2 October 1998	515
Henry teases Thomas after his accident with fish, and refuses to listen to Thomas' warning about the damaged tracks near the beach. As a result, he is mistakenly diverted onto the coastal track and gets into an accident.
120	16	"Thomas, Percy and Old Slow Coach"	David Mitton	Thomas the Tank Engine & Friends magazine story by Andrew Brenner	5 October 1998	516
When Thomas and Percy deliver some empty trucks to the smelter's yard, they meet an old slow coach due for scrap called Old Slow Coach, and try to find ways to make her useful again. After a fire burns down the workmen's hut, the engines decide to use Old Slow Coach as the workmen's new home.
121	17	"Thomas and the Rumours"	David Mitton	Thomas the Tank Engine & Friends magazine story by Andrew Brenner	6 October 1998 (Note: This episode was first released on the Spooks & Surprises VHS on 5 October 1998.)	517
121	17	"Thomas and the Rumors" (Note: Back cover and menus for Make Someone Happy & Other Thomas Adventures)	David Mitton	Thomas the Tank Engine & Friends magazine story by Andrew Brenner	6 October 1998	517
Thomas wants to help the children save their playground, but when Percy informs the other engines that Harold is flying an important visitor around, they jump to the false conclusion that Harold will replace them. Gordon tries to show he's better than Harold, but misses a red signal and crashes into an unfinished tunnel. Sir Topham Hatt explains to Thomas that the visitor was using Harold to look for a spot to build a new playground, and that Thomas should never listen to rumours.
122	18	"Oliver's Find"	David Mitton	Original by Britt Allcroft and David Mitton	7 October 1998	518
Oliver is feeling sad because he is starting to miss the long runs. Soon, he encounters some Troublesome Trucks who want Percy and angrily shunts them into the turntable well. That night, Sir Topham Hatt scolds Oliver for his thoughtless conduct and gives him the post train job for a while. During the postal run, Harold arrives late after a problem with one of his arms and the signalman falls asleep, resulting in Oliver being diverted onto an old track which leads to Toby's old branch line as Oliver crashes into the nearby shed. When Sir Topham Hatt finds Oliver the next morning, he sees an old mansion nearby and comes up with a plan to reinstate it and open it to visitors.
123	19	"Happy Ever After"	David Mitton	Original by Britt Allcroft and David Mitton	8 October 1998	519
Percy is given the task of putting together a good luck parcel for the wedding of Mrs. Kyndley's daughter with something old, new, borrowed, and blue. Percy manages to find the components for the parcel: Old Slow Coach, a new set of buffers on a borrowed flatbed truck, and a ribbon-decorated Thomas.
124	20	"Sir Topham Hatt's Holiday"	David Mitton	Original by Britt Allcroft and David Mitton	9 October 1998	520
Sir Topham Hatt arranges for Thomas to take his family on a vacation around the island, but Lady Hatt (feeling hot and tired) refuses to ride on Annie and Clarabel, saying they are "old and uncomfortable". Soon after, the Hatts face more trouble when a biplane called "Tiger Moth" crashes, and their canal boat gets stuck on a mudbank. Percy rescues them and Thomas gives them a ride home on Annie and Clarabel, who have just been refurbished.
125	21	"A Surprise for Percy"	David Mitton	Original by Britt Allcroft, David Mitton, and David Maidment	12 October 1998	521
125	21	"A Big Surprise for Percy" (Note: Make Someone Happy & Other Thomas Adventures)	David Mitton	Original by Britt Allcroft, David Mitton, and David Maidment	12 October 1998	521
Percy is bored and wants excitement, but Bertie tells him surprises only come when he does not expect it. Percy's wish comes true when the Troublesome Trucks break away and he manages to stop them, with Bertie and Sir Topham Hatt's help.
126	22	"Make Someone Happy"	David Mitton	Original by Britt Allcroft and David Mitton	13 October 1998	522
When James complains about having to shunt trucks instead of pulling passengers, Thomas tells him to think of someone else for once. And when Mrs. Kyndley is upset when her sister cannot visit, James gladly takes part in cheering her up.
127	23	"Busy Going Backwards"	David Mitton	Original by Britt Allcroft, David Mitton, and David Maidment	14 October 1998	523
Toad is sad about always going backwards, wanting to see things the other way. When Oliver takes him up Gordon's Hill, the Troublesome Trucks decide to teach Toad about being careful what he wishes for, and break away.
128	24	"Duncan Gets Spooked"	David Mitton	Original by Britt Allcroft, David Mitton, and David Maidment	15 October 1998	524
Duncan teases Peter Sam, when the slate trucks break away and fall off a bridge, saying they will haunt him, so Rusty tells him a story about a ghost engine that crosses the bridge at night. Duncan does not believe it at first, but Peter Sam and Duncan's drivers plan to trick him into going on the haunted bridge at night.
129	25	"Rusty and the Boulder"	David Mitton	Original by Britt Allcroft and David Mitton	16 October 1998	526
A new quarry is being built under a mountain, where a huge and mysterious boulder dwells. Rusty worries that the boulder is watching them. The next day, the boulder falls off the mountain and goes on a destructive rampage, chasing Rusty, Skarloey, and Rheneas before narrowly missing Percy and crashing into the quarry's standard gauge train shed, destroying it in the process. Sir Topham Hatt then orders the quarry to be shut down and the boulder to be moved to a hill, where it can do no more damage.
130	26	"Snow"	David Mitton	Original by Britt Allcroft and David Mitton	19 October 1998	525
When Thomas gets stuck while trying to clear a snowdrift from a tunnel, Rusty tells him about the worst winter of all when some slate trucks caused an avalanche, that fell right on top of Skarloey, who miraculously survived, due to his warm boiler. After Rusty's story, Gordon arrives with his snow machine to help clear the tunnel, but inadvertently causes an avalanche to fall on him. Thomas laughingly remarks that a big, proud engine like Gordon would surely be able to laugh about surviving a snowfall, like Skarloey did.

== Home Video Releases ==
=== United Kingdom ===
All twenty-six episodes were released on VHS in the UK by Video Collection International in four volumes. The last volume was also released on DVD, making it the very first UK DVD release of the show.

DVD title	Release date	Included episodes
Spooks and Surprises	5 October 1998	"Horrid Lorry"; "Gordon & the Gremlin"; "Haunted Henry"; "Toby's Discovery"; "Thomas & the Rumours"; "A Surprise for Percy"; "Duncan Gets Spooked"; "Snow"; "Rusty & the Boulder"
Happy Holidays	8 March 1999	"Sir Topham Hatt's Holiday"; "A Better View for Gordon"; "Bye George!"; "Toby & the Flood"; "Oliver's Find"; "Make Someone Happy"
Rescues on the Railways	1 October 1999	"Cranky Bugs"; "James & the Trouble with Trees"; "Put Upon Percy"; "Stepney Gets Lost"; "Something in the Air"
Peep Peep Party (Note: This release also contains the Series 1 episode "Thomas' Christmas Party" and the Series 2 episode "Thomas and the Missing Christmas Tree", alongside the Series 1 episode "Thomas and Gordon" as a DVD-exclusive.)	9 October 2000	"Lady Hatt's Birthday Party"; "Baa!"; "Double Teething Troubles"; "Thomas, Percy & Old Slow Coach"; "Happy Ever After"; "Busy Going Backwards"

Video Collection International later released a complete series VHS set in 2002, available as either a single-VHS or double-VHS release. It was soon released on DVD in 2004 as part of the "Classic Collection Boxset" before being released on its own in February 2007.

Episodes from the series have also made it to various compilation releases with other series.
