= Thomas & Friends series 8 =

Season of television series

Thomas & Friends
- Series 8
- DVD cover art
- No. of episodes: 26

Release
- Original network: Nick Jr.
- Original release: 4 October – 16 October 2004

Series chronology
- ← Previous; Series 7 Next → Series 9

Thomas & Friends is a children's television series about the engines and other characters working on the railways of the Island of Sodor, and is based on The Railway Series books written by Wilbert Awdry.

This article lists and details episodes from the eighth series of the show, which was first broadcast in 2004. This series was narrated by Michael Angelis for the United Kingdom audiences, while Michael Brandon narrated the episodes for the United States audiences.

This was the first series produced solely by HIT Entertainment.

== Production ==
Starting with this series, Thomas & Friends was broadcast in the United States as a whole television programme. It had first appeared in the form of sequences on the American television show Shining Time Station, which ran from 1989 to 1995.

This series saw the introduction of a new opening and new closing credits, as well as a brief description of the Island of Sodor before each episode began. Also starting with this series, the length of the episodes were increased to seven minutes from the original four-and-a-half minutes. The Series was broadcast in a "half hour format" that included 2 episodes of Series 8 as well as a short episode from Series 7 in the middle of the airing. In addition, it also included educational segments and additional songs. For the United States broadcasts, other changes included the additions of CGI sequences in mini-segments between episodes, transition effects, and an intro section.

For the eighth series, Steve Asquith (who had worked on the show for 20 years as a crew member) took over as director from David Mitton (who had directed the show since its first series) and Simon Spencer became the producer. In addition, Robert Hartshorne and Ed Welch took over as composers and songwriters after Mike O'Donnell and Junior Campbell departed. Paul Larson and Abi Grant were the script editors for this series.

The theme song for this new series was an instrumental version of "Engine Roll Call" composed by Ed Welch. Two arrangements were recorded. One was used in the opening for the CITV airings of series 8, while the other was used as the opening for the PBS airings of series 8 - 10 in the US and Nick Jr Uk airings, as well as the closing credits music for season 8 - 18. The CITV arrangement can also be heard on the menus of DVD releases of series 8 episodes.

The series was produced using digital Betacam SP video cameras, which created a somewhat different look for the show. There was also a subtle shift towards the use of CGI elements; these were provided by HiT Entertainment's subsidiary HOT Animation (which produced Bob the Builder, Rubbadubbers and the later version of Pingu for CBeebies), but filming remained at Shepperton Studios.

This series was also the first series that saw the use of the Steam Team, the centralised cast of eight characters: Thomas, Edward, Henry, Gordon, James, Percy, Toby and Emily.

Series 8 was taped from October 2003 to February 2004. In May of that year, several episodes were released direct-to-video in the US and UK. The series premiered on television in the UK on 4 October 2004, and in the US on 5 September 2004.

== Episodes ==
No. overall	No. in series	Title	Directed by	Written by	Original release date	Official No.	Half-Hour No.
183	1	"Thomas and the Tuba"	Steve Asquith	Dave Ingham	4 October 2004 (Note: This episode was first released on the All Aboard with the Steam Team VHS/DVD on 24 May 2004.)	820	PBS-101a
It's Lady Hatt's birthday again and the brass band is coming to play at the party. Thomas is taking the brass band, but he leaves the tuba player behind. As Thomas goes across the Island, the tuba player finds ways to catch up to him.
184	2	"Percy's New Whistle"	Steve Asquith	James Mason	4 October 2004	802	PBS-101c
Percy brags to 'Arry and Bert that his whistle is louder than their horns, and begins showing off with it, but causes trouble for the others, and eventually himself when a giant snowball hits him. Sir Topham Hatt then lectures Percy that whistles are to be used for emergency purposes only, and not for playing games. Percy then promises never to use his whistle for playing games again. And the next day, when Percy discovers a snowslide blocking the line, as well as Thomas heading directly for it, Percy sounds his whistle, and Thomas stops just in time. Thomas thanks Percy for alerting him, and that night, Sir Topham Hatt congratulates Percy for using his whistle correctly, calling him a "really useful engine" and a "safe one", too.
185	3	"Thomas to the Rescue"	Steve Asquith	Abi Grant and Paul Larson	5 October 2004	824	PBS-102a
When Thomas and Diesel are both brought to the Quarry to help Mavis with the work, Diesel lies to Thomas that Sir Topham Hatt plans to scrap the steam engines. The next morning, however, all the diesels take on contaminated fuel and are sick. Thomas is tasked to go around the island and deliver clean fuel to the diesels. Sir Topham Hatt congratulates Thomas, calling him a "really useful engine" and a "credit to the railway", and even Diesel has to agree with this.
186	4	"Henry and the Wishing Tree"	Steve Asquith	Abi Grant and Paul Larson	5 October 2004	821	PBS-102c
Henry wishes upon a sacred tree to pull the express like Gordon, but he learns to be careful what he wishes for when he sees how hard it is to pull it well.
187	5	"James Gets a New Coat"	Steve Asquith	Abi Grant	6 October 2004	823	PBS-103a
James is very proud of his splendid red coat, and he spends his time looking at his reflection in the canal, instead of helping Percy at the coaling plant. To make up for lost time, James takes a very long line of Troublesome Trucks from the coaling plant to the docks, which soon ruins his coat.
188	6	"Thomas Saves the Day"	Steve Asquith	James Mason	6 October 2004	805	PBS-103c
Thomas is excited for the opening of a new station, but must find a way through a difficult curve on the track, and it gets harder when Annie and Clarabel have to be sent away for repairs.
189	7	"Percy's Big Mistake"	Steve Asquith	Abi Grant	7 October 2004	815	PBS-104a
Percy jumps to conclusions when he overhears Sir Topham Hatt saying that Percy must go to the Scrapyard tomorrow, and thinks he is getting scrapped for being late. The next day, he tries to rush through all of his jobs, leading to him causing trouble. First, he tells Cranky to hurry up when loading pipes onto his flatbed to take to Wellsworth, prompting Cranky to go even slower, and Percy forgets to wait for the pipes to be tied down, leading to the pipes falling out of the flatbeds on the way to Wellsworth. Percy is then to take some tar wagons to the workmen mending the roads, but he ends up inadvertently crashing them into Gordon. Fearful that he will now be scrapped for sure, Percy runs away to hide in his shed. However, upon learning of Percy's reason for causing trouble, Sir Topham Hatt reveals that he was only saying that Percy was to take some trucks to the Scrapyard and then he could take the mail for a week as a break from his busy schedule.
190	8	"Thomas, Emily and the Snowplough"	Steve Asquith	Abi Grant	7 October 2004	807	PBS-104c
Thomas ignores Emily's warning about snow, and her instruction to use his snow plough. As a consequence, he ends up getting into trouble in the snow, but he learns the hard way to listen to her advice.
191	9	"Don't Tell Thomas"	Steve Asquith	Paul Larson	8 October 2004	816	PBS-105a
The engines decide to tell their appreciation to Thomas by throwing a surprise party. But they are having a hard time keeping the secret from him. Thomas is cross and steams away, but Harold chimes in and tells him that he isn't left out after all.
192	10	"Emily's New Route"	Steve Asquith	James Mason	8 October 2004	817	PBS-105c
Emily is desperate to keep her flour route after hearing that the Black Loch run has a monster in the lake; the trucks, however, give her a hard time.
193	11	"Thomas and the Firework Display"	Steve Asquith	Abi Grant and Paul Larson	9 October 2004	801	PBS-106a
Sir Topham Hatt chooses James to collect the fireworks for the Harvest Festival. Thomas, on the other buffer, feels jealousy and disappointment because he wanted that job. But when James breaks down at a red signal and soon learns the display might be cancelled when Gordon is taking the children home, he and Thomas learn that they must work together.
194	12	"Gordon Takes Charge"	Steve Asquith	Paul Larson	9 October 2004	819	PBS-106c
Gordon acts boastful around Percy as he shows the little green saddle tank engine the way to pull passengers, but forgets the dangers of the icy track as he does so.
195	13	"Spic and Span"	Steve Asquith	Marc Seal	10 October 2004	809	PBS-107a
The railway inspector is coming, and Gordon, James and Emily are determined to win the Cleanest Engine Award. Thomas and Percy find this difficult to do.
196	14	"Edward the Great"	Steve Asquith	Abi Grant	10 October 2004	808	PBS-107c
Spencer returns to take the Duke and Duchess of Boxford to their holiday home, while Edward pulls their furniture. Spencer continues to boast how much faster he is than the other engines and challenges Edward to a race, but eventually gets his comeuppance when he dreams about winning while the Duke and Duchess take photographs of the countryside, allowing Edward to sneak past Spencer and win the race.
197	15	"Squeak, Rattle and Roll"	Steve Asquith	Marc Seal	11 October 2004	806	PBS-108a
Gordon worries that he will be scrapped due to the squeaking and rattling he makes. He tries to hide this from Sir Topham Hatt, but has to take him on a run.
198	16	"Thomas and the Circus"	Steve Asquith	Abi Grant	11 October 2004	814	PBS-108c
Sir Topham Hatt assigns Thomas to collect the circus train, but warns him to share the work with another engines if there are too many trucks. Refusing James and Percy's offers to take some trucks, Thomas does not to miss out on any of the fun and tries to pull the train all by himself, despite it being too heavy for him. But he later regrets this initiative when he breaks his right traction rods and gets stranded by a field with the performers. Percy and James come to the rescue, and Thomas happily shares the train with them. At the circus show, Thomas, Percy and James all agree that not only is sharing work easier, but sharing the fun is the best fun of all.
199	17	"Thomas Gets It Right"	Steve Asquith	Robin Rigby	12 October 2004	811	PBS-109a
A storm has swept Sodor, and the engines are all given different jobs to help clean up the mess. Thomas is upset about having to go slowly with a load of Farmer McColl's eggs, as the other engines are making more journeys than him. Eventually, Thomas decides to go fast after all, but this leads to some eggs getting broken. Thomas now knows that he needs to go slowly, and he does so for the rest of his journey. That night, Sir Topham Hatt reveals that not only were most of the eggs delivered safely, but Farmer McColl gave him the broken ones to have for tea, and calls Thomas a "really useful engine".
200	18	"As Good as Gordon"	Steve Asquith	Abi Grant	12 October 2004	825	PBS-109c
Emily wants to prove that she can be as fast as Gordon. She tries to do as much work as he can, but it is too much for her and she runs out of water.
201	19	"Fish"	Steve Asquith	Paul Larson	13 October 2004	803	PBS-110a
Sir Topham Hatt tasks Thomas to help Arthur deliver a large catch of fish to the docks. Wanting to get his smelly job over with, Thomas ignores Arthur's instructions to only take five trucks at a time and instead tries to take all of the trucks at once, which leads to the Troublesome Trucks making fish hit him (much to his disgust), and later rear-ending Salty and spilling fish everywhere. Thomas apologizes to Salty, but Salty does not mind, as the smell of fish reminds him of the sea. After receiving a scolding from Sir Topham Hatt for causing confusion and delay, Thomas takes five trucks at a time and finds it easier. After Thomas finishes the work with the last three trucks, Sir Topham Hatt praises him for working hard, and Thomas happily goes to the washdown, where he sees Arthur and Salty. They all agree that getting cleaned is the best part of the day.
202	20	"Emily's Adventure"	Steve Asquith	Paul Larson	13 October 2004	804	PBS-110c
Emily has to make her way past the storm damage obstacles to deliver wood for Farmer McColl. Impatient, she bosses everybody to speed things up, which does not work. Emily now knows it is best to ask nicely whenever she does a job.
203	21	"Halloween"	Steve Asquith	Dave Ingham	14 October 2004	826	PBS-111a
It is Halloween, and Thomas and Emily are not scared to go to the smelter's yard when Sir Topham Hatt assigns them to pick up an iron delivery. Percy, worried for his friends, warns them to look out for ghosts, but Thomas and Emily assure him that ghosts are just silly make-believe. However, 'Arry and Bert want to have some fun and decide to spook Thomas and Emily but accidentally spook themselves when a tarpaulin falls on Emily, and Thomas, 'Arry and Bert mistake her for a ghost.
204	22	"You Can Do It, Toby!"	Steve Asquith	Paul Larson	14 October 2004	812	PBS-111c
Toby mopes about not being a proper engine because Gordon ridicules him for being only a steam tram engine. But the big express engine gets stuck on his hill, and Toby is his only hope.
205	23	"James Goes Too Far"	Steve Asquith	James Mason	15 October 2004	810	PBS-112a
James takes too much pride in delivering an important load of coal and ignores Edward when he needs help. Salty has a word with him and teaches him kindness.
206	24	"Chickens to School"	Steve Asquith	Paul Larson	15 October 2004	818	PBS-112c
Thomas takes on a trio of jobs (chickens to market, sheep to the farm, and the children to school) that take their toll and tire him out. He refuses help from Emily and winds up mixing up all of his jobs (the farm sheep to market, the school children to the farm, and the market chickens to the school).
207	25	"Too Hot for Thomas"	Steve Asquith	Paul Larson	16 October 2004	822	PBS-113a
Thomas is disappointed to be taking ice cream ingredients rather than children. He gets into scrapes on the way, but does not realise this job is important.
208	26	"Percy and the Magic Carpet"	Steve Asquith	Abi Grant	16 October 2004	813	PBS-113c
It is a very windy day, and the engines are preparing for the annual flower show. Sir Topham Hatt assigns Percy to collect a red carpet from the docks for the flower show. Salty tells Percy the carpet is magical when he asks what is special about it. On his way to the flower show, the carpet starts flying, and Percy thinks Salty is right, but the other engines, especially Gordon, believe the wind is making the carpet fly. However, when the carpet lands on the tracks, Percy says some magic words, and the carpet flies back onto Percy's flatbed, much to Gordon's shock. Percy delivers the carpet just in time for the flower show.
