= Thomas & Friends series 7 =

Season of television series

Thomas & Friends
- Series 7
- DVD cover art
- No. of episodes: 26

Release
- Original network: Nick Jr.
- Original release: 3 November – 15 November 2003

Series chronology
- ← Previous; Series 6 Next → Series 8

Thomas & Friends is a children's television series about the engines and other characters working on the railways of the Island of Sodor. It is based on The Railway Series books written by Wilbert Awdry.

This article lists and details episodes from the seventh series of this series, which was first broadcast from the third to the fifteenth of November 2003. This season was narrated by Michael Angelis for UK audiences, while Michael Brandon narrated the episodes for American audiences.

In the United States, this series first aired in 2004 and 2005 on PBS Kids, alongside Series 8 and 9, with 20 episodes being broadcast; the remaining episodes were released on DVD between 2005 and 2006. Michael Angelis initially re-narrated four episodes for a North American DVD release. (Note: "Gordon and Spencer", "Emily's New Coaches", "The Spotless Record" and "Peace and Quiet" were narrated by Angelis for New Friends for Thomas & Other Thomas Adventures, which was released on 16 March 2004.)

The series was the last to feature Mike O'Donnell and Junior Campbell as composers for the series, being succeeded by Robert Hartshorne. Hartshorne would rescore this series for North American releases; his score would also be used for half-hour broadcasts of the series in the UK and US.

This was both the first series produced by HIT Entertainment, and the final series produced by Gullane Entertainment.

== Episodes ==
No. overall	No. in series	UK title (top) US title (bottom)	Directed by	Written by	Original release date	Official No.	Half-Hour No.
157	1	"Emily's New Coaches"	David Mitton	Jan Page	3 November 2003 (Note: This episode was first released on the Happy Little Helpers VHS/DVD on 6 October 2003.)	701	PBS-103b
Emily, a new steam engine, arrives on the Island of Sodor and takes Thomas' coaches, Annie and Clarabel, by mistake. Thomas is not very happy, but, when Emily saves him from a crash, he forgives her.
158	2	"Percy Gets It Right"	David Mitton	Paul Larson	3 November 2003	702	PBS-108b
Percy comes across some unsafe tracks on Toby's branch line and warns the other engines that a landslide might occur, but everyone refuses to listen to him. When The Fat Controller asks Thomas to take the route on the way to collect a prize bull, he deems the tracks to be safe, despite Percy telling him otherwise.
159	3	"Bill, Ben and Fergus"	David Mitton	Brian Trueman	4 November 2003	703	PBS-106b
A small railway traction engine called Fergus tries to help Bill and Ben at the quarry, but they find him bossy.
160	4	"The Old Bridge" (Note: Also titled "The Old Iron Bridge" in the U.S. and U.K. for Half-Hour Series 8 broadcasts.)	David Mitton	Paul Larson	4 November 2003	704	PBS-110b
Skarloey nearly falls off a wooden bridge, scaring him from passing it again.
161	5	"Edward's Brass Band"	David Mitton	Robyn Charteris	5 November 2003	705	PBS-113b
Bertie is sent to collect a brass band after Edward has an accident with a crane.
162	6	"What's the Matter with Henry?"	David Mitton	George Tarry	5 November 2003	706	PBS-109b
Thomas and Percy do not believe that Henry is feeling ill and give him a whole line of coal trucks to take. Luckily, Emily cares for her friend and helps him recover.
163	7	"James and the Queen of Sodor"	David Mitton	Paul Larson	6 November 2003	707	PBS-105b
When James hears the Queen of Sodor has arrived, he volunteers to collect her, but, when the Queen turns out to be a filthy coal barge, he is instead determined to do the job and stay clean.
164	8	"The Refreshment Lady's Tea Shop"	David Mitton	James Mason	6 November 2003	708	N/A
164	8	"The Refreshment Lady's Stand"	David Mitton	James Mason	6 November 2003	708	N/A
Peter Sam is given the assignment of helping the Refreshment Lady choose a new location for a stand of the tea shop, but she can't decide where to place it.
165	9	"The Spotless Record" (Note: Also titled "Spotless Record" in the U.S. and U.K. for Half-Hour Series 9 broadcasts.)	David Mitton	Paul Larson	7 November 2003	709	PBS-202b
Thomas plays a trick on Arthur, a big red tank engine with a "spotless record". This soon backfires when Arthur ends up in an accident.
166	10	"Toby's Windmill" (Note: Also titled "Toby and the Windmill" in the U.S. for Thomas & the Really Brave Engines & Other Adventures.)	David Mitton	Jan Page (written); David Mitton (story)	7 November 2003	710	PBS-208b
Toby accidentally causes trouble at his favourite windmill with some flour trucks. To make matters worse, a storm damages it. Toby makes up for his mistake by fixing it.
167	11	"Bad Day at Castle Loch"	David Mitton	Jenny McDade	8 November 2003	711	N/A
While Donald and Douglas are pleased about Lord Callan's castle reopening, they are not too excited when they encounter something spooky that night during a trip.
168	12	"Rheneas and the Roller Coaster"	David Mitton	James Mason	8 November 2003	712	N/A
Rheneas wants to show the children a special sight but does not think anything around is good enough. In the process of finding somewhere better, he stumbles onto a twisty and unsafe track.
169	13	"Salty's Stormy Tale"	David Mitton	Polly Churchill	9 November 2003	713	PBS-113b
Salty is hurt when he hears Thomas and Percy copying the way he speaks. During a storm that night, he and Fergus fix a lighthouse and stop what could have been a terrible shipwreck.
170	14	"Snow Engine" (Note: Also titled "Oliver the Snow Engine" in the U.S. for Thomas & the Really Brave Engines & Other Adventures.)	David Mitton	Jenny McDade	9 November 2003	714	N/A
It is time for the winter festival, but Oliver does not like the snow. He has to take a delivery to some children in a mountain village. He gets stuck for the night, and in the morning he looks like a giant snow engine.
171	15	"Something Fishy"	David Mitton	Paul Larson	10 November 2003	715	PBS-205b
Arthur is disappointed when the new line at the Fishing Village is given to Thomas, who hates fish. Thomas' grumpy attitude soon leads him into a rather fishy situation.
172	16	"The Runaway Elephant"	David Mitton	George Tarry	10 November 2003	716	N/A
The Fat Controller assigns Duncan to collect an elephant statue and deliver it to a new park and instructs him to go slowly with the statue. However, he leaves the break van behind sending him on a fast chase when the statue pulls him along.
173	17	"Peace and Quiet"	David Mitton	Paul Larson	11 November 2003	717	PBS-101b
A new mighty tender engine called Murdoch only wants some peace and quiet, which is hard to find on a railway. When he passes by a noisy flock of sheep, he decides the other engines aren't so bad after all.
174	18	"Fergus Breaks the Rules" (Note: Also titled "Thomas and the Search for Fergus" in the U.S. for Thomas & the Really Brave Engines & Other Adventures.)	David Mitton	Jan Page	11 November 2003	718	PBS-211b
Diesel scares Fergus out of the cement works by telling him that the Fat Controller wants him to work at the smelter's yard.
175	19	"Bulgy Rides Again"	David Mitton	Brian Trueman	12 November 2003	719	PBS-206b
Bulgy is given a second chance at being a bus, but the hens still want him as their henhouse. The situation turns into chaos.
176	20	"Harold and the Flying Horse"	David Mitton	Robin Kingsland	12 November 2003	720	PBS-204b
Harold is sad that he cannot attend the Vicar's party, but soon discovers that he will end up going after all when he has to rescue Pegasus the Pony from a ditch.
177	21	"The Grand Opening"	David Mitton	James Mason	13 November 2003	721	N/A
Skarloey is scolded for being late by The Fat Controller, but soon proves his lateness might come in handy during the opening of a new line when the hot air balloon runs out of air, stranding The Fat Controller and Lady Hatt.
178	22	"Best Dressed Engine"	David Mitton	Polly Churchill	13 November 2003	722	PBS-103b
For May Day, the engines decorate themselves, but Gordon deems it as being an insult to express engines and refuses to participate.
179	23	"Gordon and Spencer"	David Mitton	Lee Pressman	14 November 2003	723	PBS-104b
Gordon is jealous of Spencer, the world's fastest silver streamlined tender engine. But Spencer runs out of water on Gordon's Hill, making him the one in disgrace.
180	24	"Not So Hasty Puddings" (Note: Also titled "Not So Hasty Cakes" in the U.S. for Half-Hour Series 8 broadcasts.) (Note: Also titled "Thomas and the Avalanche" in the U.S. for the Mud Glorious Mud DVD.)	David Mitton	Robyn Charteris	14 November 2003	724	PBS-107b
Thomas is jealous when Elizabeth is given the task of shipping Christmas puddings. But she slips on the icy roads, so Thomas has to help after all.
181	25	"Trusty Rusty"	David Mitton	James Mason	15 November 2003	725	PBS-111b
Rusty notices cracks in the supports of the old wooden bridge and warns the Fat Controller and the other engines that it might fall. However, Duncan refuses to listen and crosses the bridge anyway when he goes to get some coal.
182	26	"Three Cheers for Thomas" (Note: Also titled "Hooray for Thomas" in the U.S. for Hooray for Thomas & Other Adventures.)	David Mitton	Jan Page	15 November 2003	726	PBS-112b
To feel important, Thomas agrees to race Bertie. Thomas soon finds himself in an emergency when he has to deliver the children's medals and decides to put the job first.
