= Robert D. Cardona =

British-American screenwriter

- Citizenship: American; British
- Occupations: Television writer; producer; director; animator
- Years active: 1967–2001
- Notable work: Thomas the Tank Engine & Friends; Tugs; Theodore Tugboat

Robert D. Cardona is an American-born television writer, producer, director and animator. He co-founded Clearwater Features with David Mitton, in 1979.

== Career ==
Cardona has been based in the United Kingdom for much of his career. His best-known work is with his business partner David Mitton; their productions include Thomas the Tank Engine & Friends, which Cardona produced until 1986 (the second series), and Tugs, which ran for 13 episodes.

Cardona has also worked on other British TV series such as The Flaxton Boys, The Four Feathers, Thriller, Fraud Squad, Crime of Passion, Emmerdale Farm and Virgin of the Secret Service. In the early 1990s, he moved to Canada, where he worked as a director on the children's series Theodore Tugboat, which served as a continuation of Tugs. He also provided footage from Tugs for the American children's animated series Salty's Lighthouse.
