= Tugs (TV series) =

British television programme

- Created by: Robert D. Cardona; David Mitton
- Written by: David Mitton; Robert D. Cardona; Chris Tulloch; Tarquin Cardona; Gloria Tors; Roy Russell
- Directed by: David Mitton; Chris Tulloch
- Voices of: Patrick Allen; Simon Nash; Chris Tulloch; Timothy Bateson; Shaun Prendergast; Sean Barrett; Lee Cornes; John Baddeley; Mike O'Malley; Nigel Anthony; JoAnne Good
- Narrated by: Patrick Allen
- Theme music composer: Junior Campbell; Mike O'Donnell
- Composers: Junior Campbell; Mike O'Donnell
- Country of origin: United Kingdom
- Original language: English
- No. of series: 1
- No. of episodes: 13

Production
- Executive producer: J. Nigel Pickard
- Producer: Robert D. Cardona
- Production locations: Shepperton Studios, Surrey, England
- Cinematography: Clearwater periscope lens system
- Camera setup: Multi-camera
- Running time: Approx. 15-20 minutes
- Production companies: Tugs Limited; Clearwater Features; Television South

Original release
- Network: ITV (CITV)
- Release: 4 April – 27 June 1989

Related
- Thomas & Friends; Salty's Lighthouse; Theodore Tugboat

Tugs (stylized in all caps) is a British television series produced by Tugs Ltd., for Television South (TVS) and Clearwater Features Ltd. First broadcast on ITV from 4 April to 27 June 1989, it was created by Robert D. Cardona and David Mitton, who had previously produced the first two series of Thomas the Tank Engine & Friends. Set in the Roaring Twenties, the series focuses on the adventures of two anthropomorphized tugboat fleets, the Star Fleet and the Z-Stacks, who compete against each other in the fictional Bigg City Port. The theme tune and incidental music was composed by Junior Campbell and Mike O'Donnell, who also wrote the music for Thomas & Friends (from 1984 to 2003).

Despite a second series being planned, when TVS Television lost its franchise to Meridian Broadcasting, the series did not continue production past 13 episodes. Following the initial airing of the series throughout 1989, television rights were sold to an unknown party, while some models and sets from the series were sold to Britt Allcroft. Modified set props and tugboat models were used in Thomas & Friends from 1991 onwards, with footage from the original programme being heavily dubbed and edited for use in the American children's series Salty's Lighthouse.

After Clearwater's liquidation in 1990, Mitton joined The Britt Allcroft Company to continue working on Thomas & Friends in 1991, while Cardona went on to direct Theodore Tugboat, a similarly natured series set in Canada. All thirteen episodes of the show were released on VHS between 1988 and 1990.

== Format and production ==
Tugs was created by Robert D. Cardona and David Mitton, who had both previously produced the first and second series of Thomas & Friends. Tugs consists of thirteen fifteen-minute episodes (though four exist as twenty-minute episodes on the Tugs videos), each told by the show's narrator, Captain Star (voiced by Patrick Allen). Filming and production of the series took place throughout 1987 and 1988, in Shepperton Studios, Surrey, where Thomas & Friends was also filmed at the time.

The series was animated using live-action models, which were seen as the most realistic method of portraying real tugboats. The set featured the Clearwater Periscope lens system, a type of professional video camera used to film at the models' eye level.

Each model was mounted on a wheeled chassis, which were then pulled through the water using transparent string. Remote control devices were initially tested in operating the machines, but the tugboats became too heavy and unable to move through the water. Remote controls were instead used to power other devices, such as the moving eye features of the models and some cranes.

Throughout the series, the two fleets primarily contest contracts to dock and tow larger sailing vessels and objects, including ocean liners, tramp steamers and schooners. Various other contractual obligations were also completed by the two fleets, including transportation of stone, munitions and logging fell.

== Cast and characters ==
=== Star Fleet ===
The Star Fleet are the show's protagonists, who aim to work together to achieve contracts in the port. The models were styled upon the Crowley Maritime Corporation, founded in San Francisco in 1892. They are led by Captain Star, who narrates the series. The fleet consists of Ten Cents, Big Mac, O.J., Top Hat, Warrior, Hercules and Sunshine.

Another tugboat, Boomer, is briefly a member of the Star Fleet after being found floating at sea. Boomer believes himself to be jinxed, and he certainly seems to bring trouble with him wherever he goes. After numerous nasty accidents, Captain Star sells Boomer, who is later made into a houseboat. It is unknown whether he remains part of the fleet after this. The adventures of Boomer are central to the episode "Jinxed". Grampus (a naval submarine who appears throughout the series) is purchased from the Navy by Captain Star to work for the Star Fleet. It is also unknown whether this remains after the conclusion of the series.

=== Z-Stacks ===
The Z-Stacks are the show's antagonists, who are frequently seen trying to sabotage the good work of the Star Fleet. They take on the more risky contracts in the port, at the attraction of a higher pay. The models' design was taken from the Moran Tugs of New York City. They are led by Captain Zero. The fleet consists of Zorran, Zebedee, Zak, Zug and Zip. As with the Star Fleet, Boomer also briefly worked for the Z-Stacks after being sold by the former. Despite this, Boomer was also cast out of the Z-Stacks after his explosives barge spontaneously detonated.

== Voice cast ==
- Patrick Allen as Captain Star/Narrator
- Simon Nash as Ten Cents
- Sean Barrett as Big Mac, Hercules, Zebedee, Captain Zero, Izzy Gomez, Sea Rogue, Fire Tug, and Blair
- Timothy Bateson as O.J., O. Krappenschmitt, Big Mickey, Lord Stinker, Little Ditcher, and Eddie
- John Baddeley as Top Hat, Zip, Puffa, Shrimpers, Pirate Tug #2, and the Quarry Master
- Mike O’Malley as Warrior, Bluenose, Frank, Mighty Mo, Sea Rogue's Uncle, Scuttlebutt Pete, Jack the Grappler, the Princess Alice, Navy Ship, Nantucket, Johnny Cuba, and Pirate Tug #1
- Shaun Prendergast as Sunshine, Zak, and Philbert the Bell Buoy
- Chris Tulloch as Zorran and Shrimpers
- Nigel Anthony as Zug, Burke, and Davy Jones
- Lee Cornes as Grampus, Billy Shoepack, Coast Guard, Boomer, and the Fuel Depot Manager
- JoAnne Good as Lillie Lightship, Sally Seaplane, and Pearl
- Sue Glover as S.S. Vienna

Director David Mitton also plays an old tramp steamer named Old Rusty in Episode 6.

== Episodes ==
Tugs first aired on Children's ITV in the United Kingdom, and then on New Zealand's Channel 2 and Australia's ABC TV. In an interview with the Sodor Island Fansite in 2008, Mitton confirmed talks of a second series were never finalised, and eventually all plans to create a follow-up were dropped. Redubbed and heavily edited footage aired later as part of American children's series Salty's Lighthouse, which aired in 1997.

The series also aired in Japan with Japanese voice-overs.

No.	Title	Directed by	Written by	Original release date
1	"Sunshine"	David Mitton	Gloria Tors	4 April 1989 (Note: This episode was first released in Sunshine / Pirate VHS on 17 November 1988.)
In the introductory episode, narrator Captain Star (Patrick Allen) introduces the Star and Zero Fleets, as well as Bigg City Port, the harbour of the series that both fleets work in. Ten Cents (a switcher in the Star Fleet) is assigned to introduce the newest addition (Sunshine) (a hired tug from upriver) to the fleet. During a docking procedure with Duchess (an ocean liner), the leader of the Zero Fleet (Zorran) deliberately rams Sunshine into the liner, framing Sunshine as incompetent in order to secure the lucrative contract for the Zero Fleet. However, Izzy Gomez (a Mexican tramper) watched the event unfold, and with some coercion from Ten Cents, Sunshine is properly welcomed into the Star Fleet.
2	"Pirate"	David Mitton	Tarquin Cardona	11 April 1989
Bigg City Port is put on high alert when one of Ten Cents' barges goes missing. With no clear evidence in Ten Cents' favour, Captain Star demotes him until further notice. Whilst the Zero Fleet antagonise Ten Cents and accuse him of stealing the barge, the midget submarine Grampus discovers the truth. However, when more barges mysteriously go missing, Captain Star and Captain Zero join forces: the Star and Zero Fleets are paired up to catch the real thief. Meanwhile, a lone tug named Sea Rogue is being ordered to steal barges, under threat of his uncle being scuttled. Ten Cents, Sunshine and Grampus find Sea Rogue and the four of them hatch an elaborate plan to catch the real villains and save Sea Rogue's uncle - with Zip and Zug unwittingly helping too!
3	"Trapped"	Chris Tulloch	Chris Tulloch	18 April 1989 (Note: This episode was first released in Trapped, Ghosts, High Winds VHS on 22 March 1989.)
Both the Star and Zero fleets are working on the logging contract. But Zug (the smallest tug in the Zero Fleet) struggles up river with a rusted tramper when he runs into Zorran, who impatiently assists. However, Zorran's impatience forces the tramper to lodge sideways across the river, inadvertently blocking the entire Star Fleet from getting back to Bigg City Port, to Zorran's delight. Billy Shoepack, an Alligator Tug decides to utilise dynamite to blast through the tramper. Seconds before detonation, Zorran returns and is forced upon some rocks from the gushing tide. The now freed Tugs (including Zug) laugh at Zorran's newfound predicament.
4	"Regatta"	David Mitton	David Mitton	25 April 1989 (Note: This episode was first released on Munitions / 4th of July VHS on 17 November 1988.)
Lillie Lightship (moored out at sea to warn traffic of nearby land) nearly sinks following a collision with an out-of-control tramper. Grampus however comes to her rescue, and she is brought back to Bigg City Port for repair. At the same time, Bluenose the Naval Tug arrives and asks for the whereabouts of Grampus, as he is to be used as target practice during the upcoming Regatta festival. Horrified at this revelation, the Star Fleet mobilise to save their friend before taking part in the festivities.
5	"Munitions"	David Mitton	David Mitton	2 May 1989
One of the most dangerous but well-paying regular contracts the Star and Zero Fleets have is the Navy's contract for the delivery of munitions and fuel. Bluenose the bossy Naval Tug's continuous interference with the standard procedure when handling the delicate loads annoys both the Star and Zero Fleets. Later that night, with the Naval tramper Kraka Toa almost fully loaded, Bluenose arrives (cuts in) and demands his barge be unloaded immediately. Bluenose then forcefully rams into a loaded barge, setting off a catastrophic series of explosions around the Docks. Ten Cents bravely shifts a loaded Petrol barge out to sea and narrowly avoids the explosion. The following morning, the fire is put out. Bluenose is led away, clearly shocked by the previous night's events, as Captain Star warns the viewers to always respect fire.
6	"Warrior"	Chris Tulloch	Robert D. Cardona	9 May 1989
Despite being a strong tug, Warrior is often the clumsiest, bumping into ships and barges alike in his preoccupied mood. Assigned to collecting rocks from the quarry to be used as foundations at the old quay, Warrior bumps into Izzy Gomez and offers to bring him into port under tow. Izzy however, believes he can manage the task alone. Warrior leaves, warning Izzy that doing so is against the law. Big Mac is also assigned to rock delivery, but doesn't notice his barge is dangerously overloaded due to Zorran's remarks about Warrior's oafishness. Big Mac attempts the delivery regardless but Warrior accidentally sinks the barge with his wash. Meanwhile, Izzy sails in without a tow but crashes into the new foundations. Without the aid of Zip and Zug, Ten Cents prevents Izzy from capsizing but is struggling to stay afloat. Warrior arrives momentarily and helps Ten Cents, redeeming himself for his earlier mistake.
7	"High Tide"	David Mitton	David Mitton	16 May 1989
The Star and Zero Tugs each compete for a highly valuable steelworks contract. Big Mac is covered in coal dust from having worked all night so, after getting cleaned up, he and Warrior head to the docks. When they arrive they find Zebedee and Zak ready to leave with their loads of steel. Zebedee and Zak taunt the two Star Tugs but Big Mac isn't worried - he noticed Zak's engine is playing up, and it's not long before he and Warrior overtake them. Desperate not to lose the steel contract, Zak and Zebedee decide to take a shortcut through the canal - but they haven't considered the impact the high tide will have when Zebedee's high load gets too close to the railway bridge. Meanwhile, Top Hat (who is grudgingly doing Warrior's garbage collection while he's away) is travelling towards them with his car floats Frank and Eddie on each side as well as Lord Stinker. Both refuse to reverse and Zebedee's tall load (sure enough) hits the bridge. As he and Zak get help, Top Hat pulls the rig under the bridge so Puffa can cross with a Mail train, only for the bridge to collapse afterwards as a goods train approaches. Lord Stinker has Top Hat put him at the end of the rails and catches the Goods Engine, earning Top Hat's respect.
8	"Quarantine"	Chris Tulloch	Tarquin Cardona	23 May 1989
During a heatwave, several ships are quarantined at sea to prevent the risk of spreading infectious disease. O.J. (the oldest Tug in Bigg City Port) is having trouble with his engine and a near-miss with the coastguard's messenger causes his fire barge to collide with the Fultan Ferry, causing it to sink with its cargo on board. Captain Star is being pressured by Burke and Blair to sell O.J. for scrap and must make a decision soon. Meanwhile, Sunshine has been ordered to bring in the tramper Nantucket, but has his doubts when he sees its quarantine flags being lowered without authority, so he heads back to port. On his way he comes across Zorran, who's curious to know what Sunshine is up to. Ten Cents and O.J. arrive in time and when Sunshine tells them about Nantucket, Zorran rushes off to bring him in. Ten Cents furiously chases after Zorran but O.J. charges after him at full speed, saving Ten Cents from being infected but damaging his already overworked engine. Ten Cents and Sunshine tow O.J. back to the Star Dock. Captain Star is not happy about O.J. breaking down again and is about to condemn him to the scrapyard - until Ten Cents explained how he saved him from being quarantined. After one more enquiry about O.J., Captain Star sends Burke and Blair on their way and orders Ten Cents to take him to Lucky's Yard to be repaired. O.J. is grateful and promises Captain Star that he'll make sure he never regrets it. As Zorran is about to bring in Nantucket, the coastguard orders both him and the tramper to get their quarantine flags up, meaning Zorran has to stay where he is for 40 days!
9	"Ghosts"	David Mitton	David Mitton	30 May 1989
A heavy fog rolls over Bigg City Port. One night, Big Mac is on his way home to the Star Dock Pier having spent the day working with Scuttlebutt Pete, who has told him all kinds of stories about ghost tugs. As he gets closer to home some mysterious white tugs sail in front of him without making a sound. Scared by what he's seen he hurries back through the fog to tell the others, who all ridicule and laugh at him (although Sunshine remained more open-minded than the rest). The following night, however, the rest of the Star Fleet (as well as Zorran and Izzy Gomez) all get a scare when they see the mysterious tugs in and around the port. Hercules (the Ocean-going Tug) explains what the fuss is all about.
10	"Jinxed"	David Mitton	David Mitton	6 June 1989
An idling mysterious Tug is found drifting at sea. Ten Cents and Sunshine go to rescue him, but he insists that he doesn't want help and just wants them to "leave him be". The tug (whose name is Boomer) explains that his life was good when he was named Captain Harry under his previous owner; it's only since his new owner bought him and changed his name that he became jinxed. Ten Cents refuses to believe Boomer at first but things start going wrong from the very moment he tries to tow him to safety. Several unforeseen accidents involving Boomer occur around Bigg City, whose fate is left unknown when Captain Star orders him to 'never be used' as a Tug again. That is, until Ten Cents and Sunshine find out what happened to him at Lucky's Yard...
11	"High Winds"	Chris Tulloch	Chris Tulloch	13 June 1989
Johnny Cuba (a known criminal) slips into Bigg City port, marooning the Coast Guard cutter in the process. Zebedee (who has had a previous association with Cuba) is placed in a difficult position balancing his work and Cuba's demands. Meanwhile, the Star Tugs are having trouble coping with the strong winds while going about their work.
12	"Up River"	David Mitton	David Mitton	20 June 1989
Sunshine is helping Big Mac with the logging job but things go wrong when the logs pile up around him. To make matters worse, the logs catch fire and he cannot escape. Puffa (the steam locomotive) tells Ten Cents what has happened but he can't do anything either. Billy Shoepack turns up unexpectedly and offers to help. Big Mac wants nothing to do with Shoepack and his explosives, but Ten Cents begs him to give him a chance as the fire is getting worse. Big Mac reluctantly agrees as long as Shoepack only uses enough dynamite to free Sunshine. Sunshine escapes unharmed but the explosion has loosened the pile of logs to such an extent that they get swept away by the current, destroying everything in their path. Puffa returns and he hurries off to warn Uptown, where O.J., Top Hat and Warrior are working. But will they be able to save Uptown from disaster?
13	"Bigg Freeze"	David Mitton	Roy Russell	27 June 1989
Hercules is bringing in the S.S. Vienna. But with Big City Port frozen over, the job needs to be done at sea. Ten Cents and Sunshine need to get fuel for Lillie Lightship so that she can guide in the ocean liner, but Zorran has the only available fuel barge and he refuses to let them have it. When they tell O.J., Sunshine remembers a spare light barge they can use, so they set off to find it. However, Zip and Zug were listening to them and thought they heard them say "something about fuel and beating Zorran to Vienna." They steal a fire barge and use it to trap Ten Cents and Sunshine at the quay. Meanwhile, Warrior is having trouble finding an empty garbage barge for Vienna to use. He eventually settles for one that is "half empty". As darkness fell, none of the Tugs could think of a way to create a light to guide in Vienna - until Warrior decides to burn his garbage. The plan works for a while but the fire soon burns out. Ten Cents and Sunshine (who have managed to escape from the quay) found that the light barge doesn't work, until Warrior accidentally bumps into it. Zorran arrives with the fuel and (despite criticising the Star Tugs for not having any for Lillie) doesn't give her his. Zip and Zug turn up and are surprised to see Ten Cents and Sunshine there already. Zip tells Zorran about their plan but Zorran is furious, ordering them to go back and return the fire barge. When Hercules and Vienna arrive, Zorran finds out the liner doesn't need any fuel and decides to offer it to Lillie. She is grateful for the gesture but only pays half price, with Ten Cents promising that he won't say anything about Zip and Zug. With all the tugs' jobs done and Lillie's light shining again, Vienna sets off on the next stage of her journey, leaving the tugs in awe of her beauty.

== Merchandise, music, and home video releases ==
A number of items of Tugs merchandise were produced surrounding the series' release in the early 1990s, including:

- Ertl models - Ten Cents and Sunshine models were produced by toy company Ertl. The full Star Fleet cast were originally to be produced, but only these two were made. None of the Z-Stacks were produced.
- Photo books
- 2 hardback annuals
- 1 hardback dot-to-dot
- Jigsaw sets
- A bed cover
- A Tugs-themed board game
- Collector's edition thimbles
- Card game
- Publicity pack

In line with the series being released in Japan, a range of Japanese merchandise was also released, such as models of the set and characters, videos, books and an LCD game.

=== Music ===
The music for Tugs was composed by Mike O' Donnell and Junior Campbell on various synthesizers. Pete Zorn played the saxophone in the theme.

=== UK VHS releases ===
A number of VHS versions of the series were released between 1988 and 1993 in the United Kingdom and Japan. All 13 episodes were originally twenty-minutes long, but were edited to fifteen minutes for television broadcasts, most likely due to time slot issues. Three of these videos contained three fifteen-minute episodes, while two contained two twenty-minute episodes. In addition, a number of original scenes were extended/deleted for the videos, including an alternate opening title sequence. Those released included:

- "Sunshine"/"Pirate"
- "Munitions"/"4th of July"
- "Trapped"/"Ghosts"/"High Winds"
- "High Tide"/"Warrior"/"Bigg Freeze"
- "Jinxed"/"Quarantine"/"Up River"

A four episode, 65-minute version was released in 1993:

- "Trapped"/"Ghosts"/"High Winds"/"4th of July"

=== Australian VHS releases ===
VHS title	Release date	Episodes
TUGS - Sunshine/Pirate (CVI1020)	1 June 1992	Sunshine, Pirate
TUGS - Munitions/4th July (CVI1021)	1 June 1992	Munitions, 4 July
TUGS - Trapped/Ghosts/High Winds (CVI1037)	1 June 1992	Trapped, Ghosts, High Winds
TUGS - High Tide/Warrior/Bigg Freeze (CVI1093)	1 June 1992	High Tide, Warrior, Bigg Freeze
TUGS - Jinxed/Quarantine/Up River (CVI1094)	1 June 1992	Jinxed, Quarantine, Up River

=== DVD ===
Tugs has not yet been released on DVD as a series. In 2005, however, footage from the show was included as part of an episode of Salty's Lighthouse on the DVD Toddler Time.

In April 2024, to mark the 35th Anniversary of the series first broadcast, Tugs: The Exhibition, licensed by Sanctuary Records, a subsidiary of BMG Rights Management, released the fifteen minute broadcast version of Sunshine (limited to 150 copies) which included a DVD insert with behind the scenes photos taken during the production of the episode, and a booklet containing a script for the 15 minute version, the footage being taken from a U-Matic sub master tape.

Two follow up releases featuring the episodes "Pirate" and "Trapped" were confirmed for a release on April 14, with presumed plans that the Exhibition group is to release all episodes as singular releases throughout the year.

== Preservation ==
=== TUGS: The Exhibition ===
In 2012, having long been presumed destroyed, the original models from the series were located and purchased by a group of fans via eBay UK. In early 2013, they established 'The Star Tugs Company Ltd' (now renamed TUGS: The Exhibition) - a dedicated non-for-profit trust aiming to preserve, restore and display the various models and props used in the production. As of 2020, the exhibition owns the majority of the leading and supporting cast (with the exception of Top Hat, Grampus, Lord Stinker, Little Ditcher, The Two Rail Barges Eddie and Frank, and Sally Seaplane, whose whereabouts are unknown), several alternate faces for the characters, various props and other related assets to the series. In March 2022, Tugs The Exhibition announced that they had been the first group to be officially licensed by rights holders following the successful reconciliation of the rights to the series.

The exhibition was held in a railway coach, situated at Butterley station at the Midland Railway - Butterley in Derbyshire, England and is open to the public at special 'TUGS' weekends. In April 2024, the railway held displays of rarely seen models and props to mark 35 years since the series was first broadcast.
