= List of Thomas & Friends voice actors =

Thomas & Friends is a British children's television series first broadcast on the ITV network on 9 October 1984. It is based on The Railway Series books created by Wilbert Awdry and his son, Christopher Awdry. The series centers on anthropomorphic vehicles living on the fictional Island of Sodor. Its characters were unvoiced, except for the narrator, until the series switched to computer animation in 2009.

== Characters ==
Actor	Region	Role(s)	Notes
Joseph May	US	Thomas	The Adventure Begins–Series 24
John Hasler	UK	Thomas	The Adventure Begins–Series 24
John Hasler	UK/US	Rheneas	Series 20
Jonathan Broadbent	UK/US	Bill, Ben, and the first Slip Coach	
Teresa Gallagher	UK	Emily, Lady Hatt (Series 13, "Day of the Diesels" and Series 15), Mavis (Series 13–16), the Duchess of Boxford, Stephen Hatt ("Diesel's Special Delivery"), Bridget Hatt, Bridget Hatt's friends, the teacher, the laundry lady, little boy in white and light-blue striped shirt and red shorts, some children, the school children, little girl in a red dress, the blonde-haired girl, and the blonde-haired boy	
Teresa Gallagher	US	A blonde-haired girl, and a blonde-haired boy	"Very Important Sheep"
Teresa Gallagher	UK/US	Belle, Frieda, Gina (The Great Race), Mavis, Annie, Clarabel, Judy, Cassia (Big World! Big Adventures!), the Duchess of Boxford ("Percy's Lucky Day"), Lady Hatt ("The Afternoon Tea Express" and Series 21 onwards), the teacher (Series 18), the ginger-haired boy, the shouting little boy, a woman with a large hat, some passengers, the Knapford Station speaker ("The Adventure Begins"), some children ("The Adventure Begins" onwards), the school children ("Lost Property"), Stephen Hatt, Bridget Hatt, a woman in a blue dress, a Barrow fan ("Reds vs. Blues" and "Useful Railway"), Albert's wife ("Thomas the Babysitter" and "Unscheduled Stops"), a woman in a spring-green dress, a puppet-show presenter, a girl in a turquoise dress with pink flowers, a woman in a white dress and grey vest, a woman in a white shirt, light-brown skirt and hat, a woman in a light-grey shirt, dark grey skirt and a pearl necklace, a chubby boy in a dark-green shirt and dark-grey shorts, a woman in a yellow dress and hat, a blonde girl, a woman in a red-and-indigo hat and white-and-grey dress, female passengers Madeleine's mother, Brenda, and the Sodor Rangers	
Rasmus Hardiker	UK/US	Bill, Philip, and the Troublesome Trucks ("The Fastest Red Engine on Sodor")	
Rasmus Hardiker	UK	Monty	
Steven Kynman	UK	Porter, Jack, Racing Car #3, and the Dock Manager (Tale of the Brave)	
Steven Kynman	US	Charlie	The Great Race
Steven Kynman	US	Butch	Series 17–24
Steven Kynman	UK/US	Duck, Ryan (Series 20 onwards), Dart (Series 17 onwards), Paxton (Blue Mountain Mystery onwards), Peter Sam, the third Slip Coach, a workman (Journey Beyond Sodor), railway inspector (Series 17), bird-watcher ("Who's Geoffrey?"), and child	
Joe Mills	UK/US	Donald (Series 18–19), Douglas, Oliver, Toad, Welsh bird-watcher ("Thomas and the Emergency Cable"), a Knapford Station yard worker ("Toad and the Whale"), and passenger ("Confusion Without Delay")	
Tracy-Ann Oberman	UK/US	Daisy	Series 20–24
Nigel Pilkington	UK	Percy, and Trevor	Series 19–24
Christopher Ragland	US	Percy, and Trevor	Series 19–24
Christopher Ragland	UK/US	The Troublesome Trucks (The Adventure Begins onwards), Racing Car #4, cowboys, and passenger	
Rob Rackstraw	UK	Toby	
Rob Rackstraw	UK/US	James (UK: "Tit for Tat"–Series 24; US: The Adventure Begins–Series 24), Stanley, Owen, Donald (Series 20 onwards), the Small Controller, Bradford, Hugo, Big Mickey, Bernie, Professor Friederich, the Thin Clergyman, Monty, and Thief 1	
John Schwab	US	Stanley	Series 20, except "Saving Time"
Kerry Shale	UK/US	Diesel (UK: Series 13–24; US: Series 19–24)	
Kerry Shale	US	Sir Topham Hatt (Hero of the Rails–Series 18), Henry, Gordon, James (Hero of the Rails–Series 18), and Kevin	
Martin Sherman	US	Thomas, Percy, and Diesel (King of the Railway–Series 18)	Hero of the Rails–Series 18
Ben Small	UK	Thomas, Toby, and Ferdinand	Hero of the Rails–Series 18
Ben Small	US	Stanley, and Charlie	Series 15–18
Ben Small	UK/US	Rheneas, Flynn (Series 17), Owen, and the Troublesome Trucks	Series 16–18
Keith Wickham	UK	Edward, Henry, Gordon, James (Hero of the Rails–The Great Race except "Tit for Tat"), Percy (Hero of the Rails–Sodor's Legend of the Lost Treasure except Series 19), Whiff, Dash, Harold, the Thin Controller, railway coal inspector, man at the fire, Wellsworth Station worker, Sir Topham Hatt's assistant, workers, passengers, Gator's driver, and a steamworks worker	
Keith Wickham	UK/US	Harvey, Glynn, Salty, Den, Norman, Stafford, Skarloey, Sir Handel, Arlesdale Bert, Bertie, Captain, Sir Topham Hatt (UK: Hero of the Rails–Series 24; US: The Adventure Begins–Series 24), Dowager Hatt, Sir Lowham Hatt, Lord Callan, photographer ("Wild Water Rescue"), railway inspector, composer, Maron Station speaker, Wellsworth Stationmaster, Thomas' Guard, grumpy passenger, Father Christmas, groundsman, Tom Tipper, Gordon's driver (The Adventure Begins), James' guard (The Adventure Begins), Knapford Station worker (The Adventure Begins), workers, signallers, dock manager ("Who's Geoffrey?" only), a Sodor search & rescue centre worker ("Toad and the Whale"), the policemen, a Diver (Sodor's Legend of the Lost Treasure), Some Passengers, Albert ("Thomas the Babysitter"), Mr. Bubbles, the Welsh Bird Watcher ("Sidney Sings" and "Three Steam Engines Gruff"), one of Dowager Hatt's friends ("Best Engine Ever" and "Sidney Sings"), the Museum Manager, the Male Puppet show Entertainer, Willie, Franz, the Station Announcer, a child ("Gordon Gets the Giggles"), The Mainland Stationmaster, Thomas' Driver, Thomas' Fireman, and the Elderly Man	
Matt Wilkinson	UK	Spencer, Stanley, Charlie, Bash, Scruff, Rocky, Cranky, Carter, Butch (Series 16 onwards), Kevin, Tony, Stephen Hatt ("Thomas and the Runaway Kite"), Farmer McColl, the Duke of Boxford, photographer (Series 16), Maithwaite stationmaster, Farmer Trotter, Knapford stationmaster, bird-watcher ("Henry's Good Deeds"), blonde boy ("Merry Misty Island"), dock manager, railway inspector, dock workers, island inspector, Sodor search-and-rescue centre manager, Blue Mountain Quarry worker, zookeeper, and man with hat	
Matt Wilkinson	UK/US	Ben, Diesel 10, Winston, Rusty, Merrick, Captain Joe, workers, passengers, and man in blue-grey shirt, off-white shorts and aquamarine hat	

== Narrators ==
Actor	Region	Years	Series	Movies	Notes
Ringo Starr	UK	1984–86	Series 1–2		
Ringo Starr	US	1989–90	Series 1–2		Narrated episodes on Shining Time Station as Mr. Conductor; re-recorded parts of narration on request of PBS.
George Carlin	US	1991–96	Series 3–4 Re-dubbed Series 1–2		Narrated episodes of Shining Time Station as Mr. Conductor.
Michael Angelis	UK	1991–2012	Series 3–16	Calling All Engines, Hero of the Rails, Misty Island Rescue, Day of the Diesels, and Blue Mountain Mystery	
Michael Angelis	US	2004	Series 6–7		Two episodes of Series 6 and four episodes of Series 7
Alec Baldwin	US	1999–2003	Series 5–6	Thomas and the Magic Railroad (as Mr. Conductor)	
Michael Brandon	US	2004–13	Series 7–16 Re-dubbed Series 6	Calling All Engines, Hero of the Rails, Misty Island Rescue, Day of the Diesels, and Blue Mountain Mystery	
Pierce Brosnan	UK/US	2008		The Great Discovery	Pierce Brosnan narrated the original cut of Series 12, but withdrew from the series, and his narrations were left unreleased.
Mark Moraghan	UK/US	2013–17	Series 17–21 Re-dubbed Series 13–15	King of the Railway, Tale of the Brave, The Adventure Begins, Sodor's Legend of the Lost Treasure, The Great Race, and Journey Beyond Sodor	
John Hasler	UK	2018–21	Series 22–24 (as Thomas the Tank Engine)	Big World! Big Adventures! (as Thomas the Tank Engine)	
Joseph May	US	2018–21	Series 22–24 (as Thomas the Tank Engine)	Big World! Big Adventures! (as Thomas the Tank Engine)	

=== Timeline ===
==== Series ====
Narrator	Model series: 1984–2008												CGI series: 2009–21											
Narrator	1	2	3	4	5	6	7	8	9	10	11	12	13	14	15	16	17	18	19	20	21	22	23	24
Narrator	Ringo Starr																							
Michael Angelis			United Kingdom			UK		United Kingdom																
Michael Angelis			United Kingdom			US		United Kingdom																
George Carlin	US																							
George Carlin	United States																							
Alec Baldwin					United States																			
Michael Brandon						US	United States																	
Mark Moraghan													United States											
John Hasler																						United Kingdom (as Thomas)		
Joseph May																						United States (as Thomas)		

- A green cell indicates the narrator who officially narrated the series.
- An orange cell indicates the narrator who re-narrated the series.

==== Specials and films ====
Narrator	Model era: 2000–08			CGI era: 2009–17									
Narrator	Thomas and the Magic Railroad 2000	Calling All Engines! 2005	The Great Discovery 2008	Hero of the Rails 2009	Misty Island Rescue 2010	Day of the Diesels 2011	Blue Mountain Mystery 2012	King of the Railway 2013	Tale of the Brave 2014	The Adventure Begins 2015	Sodor's Legend of the Lost Treasure 2015	The Great Race 2016	Journey Beyond Sodor 2017
Narrator	Alec Baldwin	as Mr. C											
Michael Angelis		United Kingdom		United Kingdom									
Michael Brandon		United States		United States									
Pierce Brosnan													
Mark Moraghan													
