= Thomas & Friends series 13 =

Season of television series

Thomas & Friends
- Series 13
- No. of episodes: 20

Release
- Original network: Five (via Milkshake!)
- Original release: 25 January – 19 February 2010

Series chronology
- ← Previous; Series 12 Next → Series 14

Thomas & Friends is a children's television series about the engines and other characters working on the railways of the Island of Sodor, and is based on The Railway Series books written by Wilbert Awdry.

This article lists and details episodes from the thirteenth series of the show, which was first broadcast in 2010. This series was narrated by Michael Angelis for the United Kingdom audiences, while Michael Brandon narrated the episodes for the United States audiences. Mark Moraghan later re-narrated "Snow Tracks" for the Santa's Little Engine DVD.

This was Marion Edwards' first series as executive producer.

This series was released following the release of the feature-length special DVD Hero of the Rails in September 2009 and the theatrical and video releases of select episodes. This series introduced computer-generated imagery as a replacement for the show's long-standing model animation, as well as a voice cast rather than an individual actor's narration.

== Production ==
Beginning with this series, Nitrogen Studios began providing the animation.

Director Steve Asquith had left the show after the previous series, after working on twelve series and directing five series, while Simon Spencer also stepped down as producer. Christopher Skala was joined by Marion Edwards as executive producer. Ed Welch left after The Great Discovery, while Robert Hartshorne remained. Greg Tiernan and Nicole Stinn replaced Asquith and Spencer as the director and producer.

Note: The series was produced in 2009 but it would not be aired until 25 January 2010.

== Episodes ==
On 7 November 2009, four select episodes ("Splish, Splash, Splosh!", "Slippy Sodor", "Play Time", and "Snow Tracks") were screened theatrically in an event called "Splish, Splash, Splosh". The episodes were then released on a DVD of the same name in the United States, which was later released in the UK on 1 March 2010. Another event, again in the United States and titled "Thomas and the Runaway Kite", was screened on 9 January 2010, and showed a further 4 episodes. The two songs, "Sounds" and "Determination" by Ed Welch, were introduced during Series 13 after the story. The thirteenth series aired in the United States on 5 September 2010. In October 2010, the thirteenth series also aired on Nick Jr. UK.

No. overall	No. in series	Title	Directed by	Written by	Original release date	TV Order
309	1	"Creaky Cranky"	Greg Tiernan	Sharon Miller	25 January 2010	601a
After being teased for creaking by Thomas, Cranky proves to him that he is stronger than the little blue tank engine. However, when Thomas suggests Cranky to lift him up, it ends in disaster, and Thomas must save him.
310	2	"The Lion of Sodor"	Greg Tiernan	Mark Robertson	26 January 2010	601b
Thomas is tasked to transport a crate containing "The Lion of Sodor". Believing the lion is real, Thomas vows to take extra special care of it, making sure it is comfortable.
311	3	"Tickled Pink"	Greg Tiernan	Allan Plenderleith	27 January 2010	602a
Sir Topham Hatt sends James to the Sodor Steamworks for a new coat of paint. Emily has broken down while picking up Bridget Hatt to take her to a birthday party and as no other engine is available, the Fat Controller sends James, who is still painted in his pink undercoat. James, believing the others will laugh at him, attempts to hide wherever he can.
312	4	"Double Trouble"	Greg Tiernan	Sharon Miller	28 January 2010	602b
It's Sir Topham Hatt's birthday, and Thomas is sent to Maithwaite early to collect him and Lady Hatt to take them to the party. However, when Thomas arrives, he is very surprised to see that Sir Topham Hatt has a identical twin brother named Sir Lowham Hatt.
313	5	"Slippy Sodor"	Greg Tiernan	Mark Robertson	29 January 2010	603a
Mr. Bubbles the clown is coming to perform a bubble show, but Thomas is upset as he has a cracked funnel and goes to the Sodor Steamworks for a replacement. The first funnel is too tiny, and the second one is too large, so Kevin collects the only spare funnel left. Unfortunately, it looks very funny and makes Thomas feel embarrassed, and with everyone laughing at him, it proves Thomas' job of taking bubble liquid to Mr. Bubbles' show to be a bit of a slippy mess for Mr. Bubbles and Sir Topham Hatt.
314	6	"The Early Bird"	Greg Tiernan	David Richard Fox	1 February 2010	603b
With Percy at the Steamworks for repairs, Thomas is put in charge of his mail run. However, he ignores Gordon's advice to ask Percy and makes the crucial mistake of whistling loudly, disturbing the sleep of others.
315	7	"Play Time"	Greg Tiernan	Sharon Miller	2 February 2010	604a
Thomas meets a new purple tank engine named Charlie, deemed to be "The most fun engine ever" by Percy. When Thomas proves to Charlie how fun he is, it proves to be problematic for his job of taking Allicia Botti.
316	8	"Thomas and the Pigs"	Greg Tiernan	Allan Plenderleith	3 February 2010	604b
Farmer Trotter asks Thomas to collect some straw for some newborn piglets. However, Thomas thinks that the piglets would prefer something else instead.
317	9	"Time for a Story"	Greg Tiernan	Miranda Larson	4 February 2010	605a
Thomas is excited to take some new storybooks to the library for the children's storytime session. However, a mixture of unsecured trucks and bumpy tracks proves to be a problem.
318	10	"Percy's Parcel"	Greg Tiernan	Robyn Charteris	5 February 2010	605b
Percy is given the job of delivering a birthday parcel for Dowager Hatt's birthday. However, Percy decides to showcase the parcel to everyone else first.
319	11	"Toby's New Whistle"	Greg Tiernan	Louise Kramskoy	8 February 2010	606a
Everyone on Sodor is in high spirits, except for Toby as his bell needs repairs. There are no spare bells at the Steamworks, so Toby must be fitted with a very loud and big whistle. James sees Toby's new whistle and notes that it is a three-chime steam whistle, which he states that he once had and mentions that it is one of the loudest whistles he had ever heard. This makes Toby afraid to blow it, as he does not like very loud noises. However, when Toby is told to collect Lady Hatt from Knapford, he becomes scared to use the whistle due to the noise. This causes Sir Topham to remind Toby that Lady Hatt waited for too long and that Gordon is now taking her home instead, causing Toby to feel upset and feel like a useless engine. Suddenly, he spots a fallen tree across the line ahead and Gordon is steaming towards it, much to Sir Topham Hatt's horror. Toby then whistles as loud and as long as he can. Gordon, racing down the line with the express, stops just in time, with his buffers just a few inches away from the tree, and he and Lady Hatt praise Toby. Soon, Toby's bell is mended. He is offered to keep the whistle also, but he refuses, saying that his bell is all he needs to be useful.
320	12	"A Blooming Mess"	Greg Tiernan	Miranda Larson	9 February 2010	606b
Emily believes that Mavis is sad and decides to cheer her up with her flower delivery for Knapford Station. However, this just proves to be problematic for Thomas and Edward.
321	13	"Thomas and the Runaway Kite"	Greg Tiernan	Louise Kramskoy	10 February 2010	607a
Thomas goes on a wild chase around Sodor chasing after Stephen and Bridget's kite after it escapes while on a job to collect the winner's cup - ignoring his friend's offers to help.
322	14	"Steamy Sodor"	Greg Tiernan	Sharon Miller	11 February 2010	607b
Sir Topham Hatt puts Thomas in charge of the Steamworks while Victor is visiting the narrow gauge engines. However, Thomas' excitement sends the Steamworks into a complete mess.
323	15	"Splish Splash Splosh"	Greg Tiernan	Sharon Miller	12 February 2010	608a
Thomas and Rosie create a fun game called "Splish Splash Splosh" on a rainy day - where they run through a puddle and splash mud on someone. But after splashing Allicia Botti and Sir Topham Hatt, Thomas must put things right.
324	16	"The Biggest Present of All"	Greg Tiernan	Sharon Miller	15 February 2010	608b
Thomas tries to find a welcome present for Hiro, who's returning to Sodor to visit. However, his intentions of finding a present cause him to forget to ask the other engines to meet at Knapford.
325	17	"Snow Tracks"	Greg Tiernan	Alan Hescott	16 February 2010	609a
A snowstorm has covered Sodor, and Thomas and Gordon are given important jobs. While doing his job, Gordon decides to take the shorter, hilly route because he thinks he is special and stronger. This promptly leads him into trouble.
326	18	"Henry's Good Deeds"	Greg Tiernan	Alan Hescott	17 February 2010	609b
After Thomas performs a good deed for Farmer McColl. Henry, who is taking a nesting pole for a rare bird called the Sodor Warbler, decides to try and do a good deed too. However, all of his attempts go wrong.
327	19	"Buzzy Bees"	Greg Tiernan	Sharon Miller	18 February 2010	610a
Thomas is given the task of delivering beehives to Farmer Trotter. He decides to take the route past a field of flowers, only for the bees to escape.
328	20	"Hiro Helps Out"	Greg Tiernan	Sharon Miller	19 February 2010	610b
Sir Topham Hatt is rather busy - so busy he does not tell the other engines their jobs. Hiro decides to help him by giving the others their jobs, but this only results in a big muddle.

== Voice cast ==
Actor/Actress	Region	Role(s)	Notes
Pierce Brosnan	UK/US	The Narrator	
Michael Angelis	UK	The Narrator	
Michael Brandon	US	Diesel, Mr. Bubbles and the Narrator	
Ben Small	UK	Thomas and Toby	
Martin Sherman	US	Thomas, Percy, and The Bird Watcher	
Martin Sherman	US	Henry	Discounted
Keith Wickham	UK	Edward, Henry, Gordon, James, Percy, The Fat Controller, Sir Lowham Hatt, The Mayor of Sodor and Mr. Bubbles	
Keith Wickham	UK/US	Dowager Hatt	
Kerry Shale	UK	Diesel	
Kerry Shale	US	Henry, Gordon, James, Kevin, Sir Topham Hatt, Sir Lowham Hatt, and The Maithwaite Stationmaster	
William Hope	US	Edward, Toby, Rocky, Farmer McColl, Farmer Trotter, and The Maithwaite Stationmaster	
William Hope	US	Stephen Hatt	Thomas and the Runaway Kite only
Teresa Gallagher	UK	Emily, Rosie, Mavis, Bridget Hatt, Lady Hatt, Some Children, School Children, The Teacher, and Bridget Hatt's friends	
Jules de Jongh	US	Emily, Rosie, Mavis, Bridget Hatt, Lady Hatt, Some Children, School Children, The Teacher, and Bridget Hatt's friends	
Jules de Jongh	UK/US	Allicia Botti	
Matt Wilkinson	UK	Spencer, Charlie, Rocky, Cranky, Kevin, Farmer McColl, Farmer Trotter, The Maithwaite Stationmaster, The Knapford Stationmaster and The Bird Watcher	
Matt Wilkinson	UK	Stephen Hatt	Thomas and the Runaway Kite only
Glenn Wrage	US	Spencer, Charlie and Cranky	
David Bedella	US	Victor and The Mayor of Sodor	
Togo Igawa	UK/US	Hiro	
Mark Moraghan	US	Narrator	Re-dubbed Snow Tracks for "Santa's Little Engine" DVD only

A HiT Entertainment press release from 2007 stated that "3 upcoming Thomas & Friends television series" would be narrated by Pierce Brosnan. Although the statement was made prior to season 12, HiT confirmed that Brosnan would only appear as a guest narrator on The Great Discovery.
