= Thomas & Friends series 14 =

Season of television series

Thomas & Friends
- Series 14
- Official cover art for the series 14 DVD
- No. of episodes: 20

Release
- Original network: Five (via Milkshake!)
- Original release: 11 October – 8 November 2010

Series chronology
- ← Previous; Series 13 Next → Series 15

Thomas & Friends is a children's television series about the engines and other characters working on the railways of the Island of Sodor, and is based on The Railway Series books written by the Wilbert Awdry.

This article lists and details episodes from the fourteenth series of the show, which was first broadcast in 2010. There were 20 episodes in the series, preceded by Thomas & Friends: Misty Island Rescue. This series was narrated by Michael Angelis for the UK audiences, while Michael Brandon narrated the episodes for the US audiences.

== Episodes ==
No. overall	No. in series	Title	Directed by	Written by	Original release date	TV Order
329	1	"Thomas' Tall Friend"	Greg Tiernan	Sharon Miller	11 October 2010	701a
Thomas is called upon to deliver a giraffe to the zoo, but is too excited to wait for its keeper.
330	2	"James in the Dark"	Greg Tiernan	Mark Robertson	12 October 2010	701b
James refuses to be fitted with an old fashioned lamp at night, leading to confusion and delay.
331	3	"Pingy Pongy Pick Up"	Greg Tiernan	Miranda Larson	13 October 2010	702a
Emily feels that all of the engines have been given special jobs except her.
332	4	"Charlie and Eddie"	Greg Tiernan	Sharon Miller	14 October 2010	702b
Edward, trying to show Charlie that he is not too old to have fun, forgets to do his job to get Sir Topham Hatt's car fixed.
333	5	"Toby and the Whistling Woods"	Greg Tiernan	Louise Kramskoy	15 October 2010	703a
Toby has to deliver coal to the summerhouse but is afraid of going through The Whistling Woods.
334	6	"Henry's Health and Safety"	Greg Tiernan	Sharon Miller	18 October 2010	703b
Henry causes chaos on Sodor when he takes a piece of advice from Victor to heart.
335	7	"Diesel's Special Delivery"	Greg Tiernan	Jessica Sandys Clarke	19 October 2010	704a
Diesel swaps his dull load of slate for some shiny red apples in order to please the schoolchildren.
336	8	"Pop Goes Thomas"	Greg Tiernan	Mark Robertson	20 October 2010	704b
Thomas is amused by the popping sounds coming from his lemonade delivery, and takes a bumpy track to hear the noise again.
337	9	"Victor Says Yes"	Greg Tiernan	Denise Cassar	21 October 2010	705a
Victor bites off more than he can chew when he agrees to fix almost every engine on Sodor in one day.
338	10	"Thomas in Charge"	Greg Tiernan	Mark Daydy	22 October 2010	705b
The Island Inspector pays a visit to Sodor, but Thomas' ambitious plans to impress him lead to chaos and flying coal trucks.
339	11	"Being Percy"	Greg Tiernan	Rachel Dawson	25 October 2010	706a
Percy decides to imitate wise old Gordon to win the respect of the other engines.
340	12	"Merry Winter Wish"	Greg Tiernan	Miranda Larson	26 October 2010	706b
Thomas delivers the Star of Knapford, a festive light that makes wishes come true.
341	13	"Thomas and the Snowman Party"	Greg Tiernan	Jessica Sandys Clarke	27 October 2010	707a
Several children are missing a hat for their snowman; so Thomas decides to help them by looking for a hat.
342	14	"Thomas' Crazy Day"	Greg Tiernan	Sharon Miller	28 October 2010	707b
Sir Topham Hatt enlists Thomas to teach the silly Logging Locos how to be useful, but he has already promised to play a game of hide and seek with Percy.
343	15	"Jumping Jobi Wood!"	Greg Tiernan	Sharon Miller	29 October 2010	708a
Thomas and Edward are ordered to collect some precious Jobi wood from Misty Island.
344	16	"Thomas and Scruff"	Greg Tiernan	Sharon Miller	1 November 2010	708b
A new engine named Scruff arrives on Sodor to help Whiff at the Waste Dump, but gets scared when he is about to be cleaned.
345	17	"O the Indignity"	Greg Tiernan	Sharon Miller	2 November 2010	709a
Gordon is put in charge of Whiff's Waste Dump on Clean Sodor Day, but his dislike to doing the job ends up with rubbish trucks everywhere.
346	18	"Jitters and Japes"	Greg Tiernan	Sharon Miller	3 November 2010	709b
Thomas takes Dowager Hatt on a slow tour of Misty Island, but Dowager is more on the verge of something much more exciting.
347	19	"Merry Misty Island"	Greg Tiernan	Sharon Miller	4 November 2010	710a
The Logging Locos decide to throw a Christmas party, but it soon turns to chaos and nobody is having any fun.
348	20	"Henry's Magic Box"	Greg Tiernan	Sharon Miller	8 November 2010	710b
Henry helps Sir Topham Hatt deliver a special Christmas box, but it soon disappears and trees keep appearing one by one. Can Henry find out what is going on?

== Voice cast ==
Actor/Actress	Region	Role(s)	Notes
Michael Angelis	UK	The Narrator	
Michael Brandon	US	The Narrator, Diesel and Mr. Bubbles	
Ben Small	UK	Thomas, Toby and Ferdinand	
Keith Wickham	UK	Edward, Henry, Gordon, James, Percy, Whiff, Dash, Salty, Captain, Harold, The Fat Controller, Dowager Hatt and Mr. Bubbles	
Kerry Shale	UK	Diesel	
Teresa Gallagher	UK	Emily, Rosie, Mavis, Bridget Hatt, Stephen Hatt, The Laundry Lady, the School Children, Some Children, the Small Boy and the Ginger Haired Boy	
		The Ginger Haired Boy	Diesel's Special Delivery and Pop Goes Thomas
Matt Wilkinson	UK	Spencer, Charlie, Bash, Scruff, Victor, Rocky, Cranky, Kevin, the Railway Inspector, and the Island Inspector	
Matt Wilkinson	UK	The Blond Haired Boy	Merry Misty Island only
David Bedella		Victor	
Togo Igawa	UK US	Hiro	
