= Thomas & Friends series 15 =

Season of television series

Thomas & Friends
- Season 15
- Official cover art for the series 15 DVD
- No. of episodes: 20

Release
- Original network: Channel 5
- Original release: 1 March – 28 March 2011

Series chronology
- ← Previous; Series 14 Next → Series 16

Thomas & Friends is a children's television series about the engines and other characters working on the railways of the Island of Sodor, and is based on The Railway Series books written by Wilbert Awdry.

This article lists and details episodes from the fifteenth series of the show, which was first broadcast in March 2011, making it the third series to be broadcast in less than a month. This series was narrated by Michael Angelis for the UK audiences, while Michael Brandon narrated the episodes for the US audiences.

Season 15 of Thomas & Friends had 20 episodes.

== Episodes ==
| No. overall | No. in series | Title | Directed by | Written by | Original release date | TV Order |
|---|---|---|---|---|---|---|
| 349 | 1 | "Gordon and Ferdinand" | Greg Tiernan | Sharon Miller | 1 March 2011 | 801a |
Gordon is embarrassed to be working with Ferdinand delivering the Lion of Sodor to the summer house.
| 350 | 2 | "Toby and Bash" | Greg Tiernan | Sharon Miller | 2 March 2011 | 801b |
Toby wants to give Bash the perfect home on Sodor after enjoying the sights of the island, but soon grows homesick.
| 351 | 3 | "Emily and Dash" | Greg Tiernan | Sharon Miller | 3 March 2011 | 802b |
Dash shows Emily a game that involves making tweeting sounds with his whistle, but trouble strikes when he runs out of fuel and Emily abandons him.
| 352 | 4 | "Percy's New Friends" | Greg Tiernan | Gerard Foster | 4 March 2011 | 802a |
With his friends busy with jobs, Percy decides to befriend the wild animals on Sodor. However, his noisiness scares them all away.
| 353 | 5 | "Edward the Hero" | Greg Tiernan | Sharon Miller | 7 March 2011 | 803b |
Since Edward is given a special job to do, he decides that he needs to become a hero like Harold.
| 354 | 6 | "James to the Rescue" | Greg Tiernan | Sharon Miller | 8 March 2011 | 803a |
James rejects Toby's help and refuses to work as part of a team when Gordon needs rescuing.
| 355 | 7 | "Happy Hiro" | Greg Tiernan | Sharon Miller | 9 March 2011 | 804b |
Thomas tries to cheer Hiro up when he sees that he does not look very happy.
| 356 | 8 | "Up, Up and Away!" | Greg Tiernan | Sharon Miller | 10 March 2011 | 804b |
Thomas and Percy are chosen to deliver a giant balloon, to problematic results.
| 357 | 9 | "Henry's Happy Coal" | Greg Tiernan | Sharon Miller | 11 March 2011 | 805a |
Henry is given the special task of taking a very important visitor around on a tour but finds himself teased about the special coal he has to use.
| 358 | 10 | "Let It Snow" | Greg Tiernan | Sharon Miller | 14 March 2011 | 805a |
While on a job with Gordon collecting logs for an animal shelter, Thomas thinks that singing a song can make the snow clouds appear.
| 359 | 11 | "Surprise, Surprise" | Greg Tiernan | Sharon Miller | 15 March 2011 | 806a |
Percy, Edward and Stanley are unable to be fixed in time to attend the Christmas party. To makeup, Thomas decides to hold his own party at the Steamworks; not wanting to bother Victor, he decides to hold it in secret.
| 360 | 12 | "Spencer the Grand" | Greg Tiernan | Jessica Sandys Clarke | 16 March 2011 | 806b |
It is a very foggy day and the engines are asked to stay put until the weather clears. However, Spencer and Percy do not hear the warning.
| 361 | 13 | "Stop That Bus!" | Greg Tiernan | Sharon Miller | 17 March 2011 | 807a |
Thomas feels sorry for Bertie, so he takes him on a tour. Bertie then realizes that he needs to go and collect a group of people and cannot be late.
| 362 | 14 | "Stuck on You" | Greg Tiernan | Sharon Miller | 18 March 2011 | 807b |
Butch and Thomas try to figure out how to use his new magnet, but they refuse to listen to Victor and end up in a sticky situation.
| 363 | 15 | "Big Belle" | Greg Tiernan | Sharon Miller | 21 March 2011 | 808a |
Belle attempts to befriend Toby when she discovers that they have something in common. However, her bolshy behaviour overwhelms him.
| 364 | 16 | "Kevin the Steamie" | Greg Tiernan | Laurie Israel & Rachel Ruderman | 22 March 2011 | 808b |
When Kevin is left in charge of the Steamworks, he decides to use the space to practice his shunting skills with disastrous results.
| 365 | 17 | "Wonky Whistle" | Greg Tiernan | Neil Ben | 23 March 2011 | 809a |
Thomas' whistle is all wonky, so he goes to the Steamworks to have it repaired. However, he rushes off on a delivery for the Country Show before it is properly fixed.
| 366 | 18 | "Percy the Snowman" | Greg Tiernan | Lizzie Ennever | 24 March 2011 | 809b |
Thomas is charged with the important task of transporting Sir Topham Hatt to the town square to switch on the Christmas lights. He promises to Percy that he will help him, but only proceeds to cover the green tank engine in the snow.
| 367 | 19 | "Tree Trouble" | Greg Tiernan | Sharon Miller | 25 March 2011 | 810b |
The steam engines compete against the diesels to find the best Christmas tree on Sodor. Can the trains transport the trees back to town in one piece?
| 368 | 20 | "Fiery Flynn" | Greg Tiernan | Sharon Miller | 28 March 2011 | 810b |
A new enthusiastic fire engine called Flynn tries to impress the Diesels with his bravado, but his actions have potentially disastrous consequences.

== Voice cast ==
Rupert Degas joined the voice cast. Degas originally voiced Diesel 10 in Misty Island Rescue, but was replaced by Matt Wilkinson.

| Actor/Actress | Region | Role(s) | Notes |
|---|---|---|---|
| Michael Angelis | UK | The Narrator | |
| Michael Brandon | US | The Narrator and Diesel | |
| Ben Small | UK | Thomas, Toby and Ferdinand | |
| Keith Wickham | UK | Edward, Henry, Gordon, James, Percy, Whiff, Dash, Harold, the Fat Controller, Mr. Bubbles and the Railway Coal Inspector | |
| Keith Wickham | UK | Salty, Norman, Den, Captain and Dowager Hatt | |
| Kerry Shale | UK | Diesel | |
| Kerry Shale | UK | Henry, Gordon, James, Dash, 'Arry and Bert, Harold, Kevin, Sir Bertram Topham Hatt and the Railroad Coal Inspector | |
| Kerry Shale | UK | A Steamworks worker and the Farm Hands | |
| Teresa Gallagher | UK | Belle | |
| Teresa Gallagher | UK | Emily, Rosie, Mavis, Lady Hatt, Some Children, The Ginger Haired Boy and The Blond Haired Boy | |
| Teresa Gallagher | The Ginger Haired Boy | Emily and Dash and Percy the Snowman | |
| Matt Wilkinson | UK | Spencer, Stanley, Charlie, Bash, Victor, Rocky, Cranky, Butch Kevin, Farmer McColl, the Duke of Boxford, the Maithwaite Stationmaster, and The Sodor Search & Rescue Centre Manager | |
| David Bedella | | Victor | |
| Togo Igawa | UK | Hiro | |
| Rupert Degas | UK | Dart, Flynn and Bertie | |
