= Thomas & Friends series 16 =

Season of television series

Thomas & Friends
- Series 16
- Official cover art for the series 16 DVD
- No. of episodes: 20

Release
- Original network: Channel 5
- Original release: 20 February – 25 December 2012

Series chronology
- ← Previous; Series 15 Next → Series 17

Thomas & Friends is a children's television series about the engines and other characters working on the railways of the Island of Sodor, and is based on The Railway Series books written by Wilbert Awdry.

This article lists and details episodes from the sixteenth series of the show, which was first broadcast in 2012. This series was narrated by Michael Angelis for the United Kingdom audiences, while Michael Brandon narrated the episodes for the United States audiences. This was their last series; starting from series 17, Mark Moraghan took over as narrator.

Additionally, this was Sharon Miller's last series as head writer, and it was also the last series to feature episodes written by Miller (although she continued to work as voice director).

This was also the last series to be produced by Nitrogen Studios.

== Episodes ==
No. overall	No. in series	UK title (top) US title (bottom)	Directed by	Written by	Original release date	TV Order
369	1	"Race to the Rescue"	Greg Tiernan	Sharon Miller	20 February 2012	901a
Flynn proves to the others that he can run on the road, even though he has never done it before.
370	2	"Ol' Wheezy Wobbles"	Greg Tiernan	Sharon Miller	21 February 2012	901b
Thomas asks for Den and Dart's help when Ol' Wheezy stops working, but doesn't understand that they prefer to work together.
371	3	"Express Coming Through"	Greg Tiernan	Sharon Miller	22 February 2012	902a
Dowager Hatt is having a party for some important visitors, and Thomas is chosen to pull the express that Gordon pulls, which is harder than he expected.
372	4	"Percy and the Monster of Brendam"	Greg Tiernan	Sharon Miller	23 February 2012	902b
Percy believes one of Salty's tales and looks for "the Monster of Brendam".
373	5	"Ho Ho Snowman"	Greg Tiernan	Sharon Miller	24 February 2012	903a
After shunting the Troublesome Trucks with Thomas, Charlie tries to show Henry how much fun snow is and hides behind a snowman as Henry passes and pretends to be the former snowman to help him appreciate snow.
374	6	"Flash Bang Wallop!"	Greg Tiernan	Jessica Sandys Clarke	27 February 2012	903b
One morning, the engines are at Tidmouth Sheds when Sir Topham Hatt arrives, holding a big book. The book is entitled Great Railways and is full of photographs of engines on the Mainland. Sir Topham Hatt goes on to tell the engines that a photographer is coming to the island to take some photographs for a book featuring Sodor's engines. When the Sir Topham Hatt leaves, Percy, James, Thomas and Gordon argue over who will have their picture taken. Gordon is sure that he will have the most photographs taken, but Thomas is determined to prove Gordon wrong and get into as many photos as he can. However, when he causes Percy and James to crash and the photographer to drop his camera (causing it to break), he must ask Rocky for help.
375	7	"Thomas and the Rubbish Train"	Greg Tiernan	Andrew Viner	28 February 2012	904a
375	7	"Thomas and the Garbage Train"	Greg Tiernan	Andrew Viner	28 February 2012	904a
Thomas helps Whiff pull a train to the waste dump but attempts to rush it all to do a more important job.
376	8	"Thomas Toots the Crows"	Greg Tiernan	Dan & Nuria Wicksman	29 February 2012	904b
Thomas' attempts to scare away the crows at Farmer McColl's farm end in one problem after another.
377	9	"Bust My Buffers!"	Greg Tiernan	Sharon Miller	1 March 2012	905a
Gordon's bufferbeam is broken when bashing into flatbeds and he is given a diesel locomotive bufferbeam from Den and Dart, much to his dismay.
378	10	"Percy and the Calliope"	Greg Tiernan	Max Allen	2 March 2012	905b
While taking trucks of scrap with Diesel to the Smelters Yard, Percy tries to save an old calliope that came from the Duke and Duchess of Boxford.
379	11	"Thomas and the Sounds of Sodor"	Greg Tiernan	Gerard Foster	5 March 2012	906a
Thomas helps a famous composer look for inspiration for his new music.
380	12	"Salty's Surprise"	Greg Tiernan	Sharon Miller	6 March 2012	906b
Edward tries to find Salty a Christmas present after Salty says he has no time for the holidays.
381	13	"Sodor Surprise Day"	Greg Tiernan	Kirsty Peart & Jess Kedward	7 March 2012	907a
Thomas tries to get Gordon to have fun on Sodor Surprise Day, but his attempts almost ruin the fun for everyone.
382	14	"Emily's Winter Party Special"	Greg Tiernan	Max Allen	8 March 2012	907b
Sir Topham Hatt tells Emily that she can pull the Winter Special if she finds his top hat.
383	15	"Muddy Matters"	Greg Tiernan	Max Allen	9 March 2012	908a
James doesn't want to get muddy while delivering Farmer McCall's sheep to a festival.
384	16	"Whiff's Wish"	Greg Tiernan	Andy Bernhardt	12 March 2012	908b
Whiff wishes that he was as grand as Spencer, and tries to implement the advice that Spencer gave him by taking important jobs instead of collecting rubbish trucks.
385	17	"Welcome Stafford"	Greg Tiernan	Sharon Miller	13 March 2012	909a
Spencer shows Stafford, the new electric shunting engine, around Sodor, but ignores a warning that Stafford's batteries could run out.
386	18	"Don't Bother Victor!"	Greg Tiernan	Sharon Miller	14 March 2012	909b
Mr. Percival leaves Peter Sam in charge of the Narrow Gauge Railway, telling him not to bother Victor during his visit.
387	19	"Happy Birthday Sir!"	Greg Tiernan	Sharon Miller	15 March 2012	910a
Thomas and Winston attempt to find and restore an open-top carriage for Sir Topham Hatt's birthday.
388	20	"The Christmas Tree Express"	Greg Tiernan	Sharon Miller	25 December 2012	910b
Toby takes Rheneas to Misty Island where Bash, Dash, and Ferdinand live to find a perfect Christmas tree.

== Voice cast ==
Steven Kynman (Peter Sam) joined the voice cast.

Togo Igawa did not feature (due to working on other television work), resulting in Hiro having a non-speaking role of appearance throughout this series of episodes. Michael Angelis and Michael Brandon left the voice cast after this series. (This is also Michael Angelis' final narration before his death in May 2020.)

William Hope takes over the voice of Bert from Kerry Shale, Ben Small takes over the role of Charlie in the US and Matt Wilkinson takes over the role of Butch the UK from Rupert Degas.

Actor	Region	Role(s)
Michael Angelis	UK	Narrator
Michael Brandon	US	The Narrator and Diesel
Ben Small	UK	Thomas, Toby and Ferdinand
Ben Small	US	Charlie
Ben Small	UK/US	Rheneas and the Troublesome Trucks
Keith Wickham	UK	Edward, Henry, Gordon, James, Percy, Whiff, Dash, the Fat Controller, the Thin Controller, the Mayor of Sodor and the Man at the Fire
Keith Wickham	UK/US	Salty, Den, Stafford, Skarloey, Sir Handel, Dowager Hatt and the Great Composer
Kerry Shale	UK	Diesel
Kerry Shale	UK/US	'Arry
Kerry Shale	UK	Bert
Teresa Gallagher	UK	Emily, Rosie, Mavis, The Duchess of Boxford, the Schoolboy, Little Girl in the Red Dress, and the Ginger Hair Boy
Matt Wilkinson	UK	Spencer, Charlie, Bash, Victor, Rocky, Cranky, Butch, Kevin, Farmer McColl, the Duke of Boxford, the Photographer and the Dock Manager
Matt Wilkinson	UK/US	Winston and Rusty
David Bedella	US	Victor and the Mayor of Sodor
Rupert Degas	UK/US	Dart, Flynn and Bertie
Steven Kynman	UK/US	Peter Sam
