= Thomas & Friends series 24 =

Season of television series

Thomas & Friends
- Series 24
- No. of episodes: 20 (+3 half-hour specials)

Release
- Original network: Channel 5 (UK); Netflix (Worldwide)
- Original release: 2 May 2020 – 20 January 2021

Series chronology
- ← Previous; Series 23

Thomas & Friends is a children's television series about the engines and other characters on the railways of the Island of Sodor, and is based on The Railway Series books written by the Reverend W. Awdry.

This article lists and details episodes from the 24th and final series of the show, which premiered on 2 May 2020 in the United Kingdom, and 1 September 2020 in the United States on Netflix.

The series consists of 20 regular episodes as well as three half-hour specials: "A New Arrival", "World of Tomorrow", and "Thomas and the Royal Engine". The first two form a movie entitled "Marvelous Machinery”, while the latter is a celebratory episode commemorating the 75th anniversary of the original books.

As the "Big World! Big Adventures!" rebrand of the show was deemed a failure, Series 24 became the last series of the original Thomas & Friends series, with the next series retooled into Thomas & Friends: All Engines Go, a complete reboot of the series.

== Voice cast ==
- John Hasler as Thomas (UK)
- Joseph May as Thomas (US)
- Federico Trujillo as Raul and Marcio
- Monica Lopera as Gabriela
- Laura Cucurullo as Cassia and Marcia
- Francisco Labbe as Gustavo
- Keith Wickham as Gordon (UK), Henry (UK), Edward (UK), Harvey, Salty, Skarloey, Sir Handel, Bert, Bertie, Harold (UK), Sir Topham Hatt, Mr. Percival (UK), Dowager Hatt, and Albert the workman
- Kerry Shale as Gordon (US), Henry (US), Diesel (UK/US), the Troublesome Trucks, Harold (US), and Mr. Percival (US)
- Teresa Gallagher as Emily (UK), Belle, Annie and Clarabel, Stephen Hatt, Bridget Hatt, the School children, some Passengers, and Some Children
- Jules de Jongh as Emily (US) and Some Children (US)
- William Hope as Edward (US), Toby (US), Rocky, (US), and Farmer McColl (US)
- Rob Rackstraw as James (UK/US), Toby (UK), Owen, the Troublesome Trucks, the Thin Clergyman, Professor Friedrich, Bernie, Headkeeper Jack, Fergus Duncan, The Announcer, and some Passengers
- Glenn Wrage as Cranky (US)
- David Bedella as Victor (UK/US)
- Tim Bain as Aiden and The Australian Bus
- Togo Igawa as Hiro
- Christopher Ragland as Percy (US)
- Tina Desai as Ashima
- Steven Kynman as Peter Sam and Farmer Willie
- Nigel Pilkington as Percy (UK)
- Lucy Montgomery as Marion and Carly
- Mike Grady as Sir Robert Norramby
- Colin McFarlane as Bulgy, Beresford, and Dr. Holyfield
- Bob Golding as Baz
- Matt McCooey as Kenji
- Jamie Campbell Bower as Skiff
- Tim Whitnall as Reg
- Joe Swash as Sonny
- Shane Jacobson as Shane
- Sanjeev Bhaskar as Shankar, the Indian Announcer, and the Indian Judge
- Sheena Bhattessa as Noor Jehan, Charubala, and the Indian Troublesome Trucks
- Dominique Moore as Ruth
- Genevieve McCarthy as Aubrey
- Rachael Miller as Rebecca, Prince Charles, Some Children, Little Thomas, and Dr. Hetty
- Harriet Kershaw as Cleo
- Yvonne Grundy as Nia
- Tracy-Ann Oberman as Daisy
- Matt Wilkinson as Ben, Cranky (UK), Rocky (UK), Farmer McColl (UK), Rusty, and Merrick
- Rasmus Hardiker as Bill and Philip
- Nicola Stapleton as Rosie
- Maggie Ollerenshaw as Henrietta
- Siu-see Hung as Dr. Kim
- Windson Liong as Lei
- Chris Lew Kum Hoi as Yong Bao and the Mean Engines
- Rose Robinson as Tamika and the Crowd
- Rosamund Pike as Duchess
- Dan Li as the Chinese Railway Inspector
- Nikhil Parnar as Rajiv and the Indian Troublesome Trucks
- Flaminia Cinque as Ester
- Anna Francolini as Gina
- Montserrat Lombard as Mia
- Vincenzo Nicoli as Lorenzo and Beppe
- Peter Andre as Ace
- Sharon Miller as Elizabeth II

== Episodes ==
| No. overall | No. in series | Title | Directed by | Written by | Original release date | TV Order |
|---|---|---|---|---|---|---|
| 562 | 1 | "Thomas and the Royal Engine" | Joey So | Michael White | 2 May 2020 | 63 |
An invitation from Queen Elizabeth II and Prince Charles sends Thomas and Sir Topham Hatt to London as they weave through delays and debacles past Beresford at the canal, tree branches, empty water towers from getting cleaned, and losing Thomas' fireman while racing to a royal celebration. Luckily, Sir Topham Hatt works with Thomas' driver as a fireman and the Queen's royal tender engine, Duchess, helps Thomas with the directions of London as Thomas offers to push her the rest of the way. Thomas and Sir Topham Hatt are given their awards at the next station.: This is a 75th Anniversary special.
| 563 | 2 | "Emily's Best Friend" | Dianna Basso | Camille Ucan & Rose Johnson | 7 September 2020 | 64a |
Emily worries she doesn't have a best friend to spend time with while doing her job, such as Edward, Henry, Marion, and Philip, but when Thomas and Percy help her out of a tricky situation to deliver trucks of sand to Tidmouth Town Hall for the sand sculpture of the Steam Team, she realizes she's been surrounded by best friends all along.
| 564 | 3 | "Thomas' Fuzzy Friend" | Dianna Basso | Becky Overton | 8 September 2020 | 64b |
Thomas discovers a missing dog on the railway and tries to find it a new home, despite getting protests from Annie and Clarabel. While stopped by a workman's hut, the dog notices a squirrel and gives chase. While trying to retrieve the dog, Thomas accidentally runs into a branch on the tracks and is derailed in the forest. Emily eventually finds Thomas in the woods and after fetching Rocky, takes him back to Knapford. At Knapford, little Thomas promises to look after the dog and bring it to see Thomas, and gives him the name Fuzzy.
| 565 | 4 | "The Great Little Railway Show" | Dianna Basso | Michael White | 9 September 2020 | 65a |
When a Railway Show for little engines comes to Sodor, an overly excited Percy finally gets his chance to shine as he spread the news of the show, passed throughout the Island by Philip, Oliver, Paxton, Rosie, and Thomas. But his misunderstanding leads the little engines to leave Sir Topham Hatt, Mr. Percival, and Fergus Duncan's railways and head for Ulfstead Castle. Soon, after Percy states that everyone is there for the little railway show, the Thin Clergyman explains that Sir Topham Hatt was referring to model engines, rather than small working engines.
| 566 | 5 | "Thomas and the Forest Engines" | Dianna Basso | Davey Moore | 10 September 2020 | 65b |
In Brazil, Thomas meets two wood-burning engines who've never travelled beyond their eucalyptus railway. Thomas agrees to swap jobs with them for the day, but this causes more trouble than he expects. His two new friends find that there is a reason why they are best suited to their short eucalyptus railway, they have a small fuel supply. Eventually, Thomas finishes work and, knowing that Marcia and Marcio should have returned by then, sets out to look for his new friends with Emerson's help. Eventually, he finds them and brings more eucalyptus wood from their railway. The three of them finally manage to make the delivery to the docks.
| 567 | 6 | "Emily to the Rescue" | Dianna Basso | Becky Overton | 11 September 2020 (Note: This episode was first released on The Royal Engine DVD on May 4, 2020.) | 66a |
A Safety inspector comes to Sodor to make sure everything is running well. All the engines have to be checked over and can continue with their regular work. Then, there was an emergency drill. The engine closest to Rocky is to collect him. Rebecca, James, and Percy all go to collect Rocky, not knowing who is closest. Percy overruns a red signal, causing all three engines to derail and Emily immediately goes to fetch Rocky to help. Meanwhile, Gordon is forced to go a different route with the express, but a road bridge to start cracking. Luckily, Emily brings Rocky to hold the bridge up so Gordon can move and is made the official Sodor safety engine and given the number 12.
| 568 | 7 | "Shankar's Makeover" | Dianna Basso | Camille Ucan & Rose Johnson | 14 September 2020 | 66b |
In India, Thomas pushes Shankar into entering the Fancy Costume Contest with him, Ashima, Rajiv, and Noor Jehan, even though Shankar doesn't want to have the spotlight shine on him, especially doing the Shankar Shimmy with the Troublesome Trucks. When the attention becomes too much for Shankar, he shouts that he did not want to enter the contest in the first place. Charubala softly tells him he did not have to if he did not want to, and Thomas admits that it was his fault for pushing Shankar into it. Shankar happily goes back to doing what he does best, shunting in the yards.
| 569 | 8 | "Nia and the Unfriendly Elephant" | Dianna Basso | Davey Moore | 15 September 2020 | 67a |
Nia is given the job of bringing an elephant to the Animal Park but hits a problem. The elephant does not like steam engines. Nia tries all sorts of ways to get the elephant to agree with her and go to the park with singing a song, using Percy's apples, and having Belle spray water to lead the elephant onboard, but she is not able. She finally thinks of a way to succeed, and when she does, she is given the job of helping out at the animal park.
| 570 | 9 | "Thomas' Not-So-Lucky Day" | Ian Cherry | Becky Overton | 16 September 2020 | 67b |
When Thomas has a run of bad luck in Italy, he tries everything to get back on track, even if it means following Lorenzo and Beppe's strange superstitious advice. However, Gina, Ester, and Mia explain to Thomas that superstition isn't real and that he had to be positive and focus on being on track.
| 571 | 10 | "James the Super Engine" | Dianna Basso | David Stoten | 17 September 2020 | 68a |
Rebecca tells James he could be a comic-book super engine, he takes her seriously after Rocky accidentally spills oil barrels on him, and Rail Rocket is born.
| 572 | 11 | "Ace's Brave Jump" | Ian Cherry | Camille Ucan & Rose Johnson | 18 September 2020 | 68b |
Thomas helps his friend Ace overcome his fear of animals so that he can compete in the Super Stunt Rally to jump over twenty-five double decker buses. At first, Ace is nervous, but as he sees more and more animals, he stops being scared of them and grows to like them. The next day, Thomas is ready to watch Ace do his jump, but he realizes that Ace can't find the double decker buses everywhere, likely because none of the double decker buses have shown up. Thomas, Shane, Tamika, Aubrey and Aidan (The Kings of the Railway) decide to position themselves on the track so that Ace can jump over them, and the Super Stunt Rally is a success.
| 573 | 12 | "A New Arrival" | Joey So | Paul Larson & Laura Beaumont | 24 October 2020 (Note: This episode was first released on the Marvellous Machinery DVD on September 28, 2020.) | 69 |
When Thomas finds out that the Earl's Technology Fair will bring new inventions to Sodor, he sets out to prove that steam engines are the best inventions ever, as Ruth, an American inventor who wanted to be a railway engineer, tells Thomas that he and the other steam engines are one of the best. Meanwhile, an engine from the Mainland named Sonny arrives on Sodor bringing two men named Baz and Bernie who are plotting to steal one of the inventions to get rich.
| 574 | 13 | "World of Tomorrow" | Joey So | Laura Beaumont & Paul Larson | 25 October 2020 | 70 |
After meeting Kenji, a fast electric diesel engine, the steam team become worried that they will be replaced by new inventions. As the Technology Fair commences, Baz and Bernie try to find the best invention to steal, until they settle on stealing the blueprints for Ruth's hover car. However, Sonny stands up to the pair, encouraged by the idea of becoming a really useful engine after meeting Thomas, who teaches him the ways of the Fat Controller's railway. As a result, Baz and Bernie use Kenji as their getaway vehicle instead and tie Sonny's regulator open to create a distraction. After being caught by Thomas, Sonny reveals Baz and Bernie's intentions. Once Thomas catches up to Kenji with a jet engine, Baz and Bernie are taken away by the policemen. As Ruth decides to stay on Sodor, Sir Topham Hatt decides to give Sonny a second chance and brings him into the North Western Railway fleet.
| 575 | 14 | "Nia's Bright Idea" | Ian Cherry | Camille Ucan & Rose Johnson | 5 December 2020 | 74b |
| 576 | 15 | "Cleo's First Snow" | Ian Cherry | Becky Overton | 6 December 2020 | 75a |
| 577 | 16 | "Sonny's Second Chance" | Ian Cherry | Becky Overton | 11 January 2021 | 71a |
After being given a chance to prove himself by Sir Topham Hatt, Sonny does not think his chances are good when he is shown hostility by Gordon and James. It seems Diesel is the only one really willing to be his friend, but it turns out Diesel is just tricking Sonny into doing his jobs for him, which Sonny finds out while talking with Thomas and pulling fish trucks. Diesel tries to follow after him, but gets diverted into a siding, derails, and is about to fall into a pit. Sonny reverses to the siding, derailing the fish trucks over the points in the process, and saves Diesel. Although he had derailed the fish trucks, Sonny's heroic actions earn him praise from Sir Topham Hatt as a really useful engine indeed.
| 578 | 17 | "Thomas and the Inventor's Workshop" | Ian Cherry | Camille Ucan & Rose Johnson | 12 January 2021 | 71b |
Thomas travels around Sodor with Annie and Clarabel to help Ruth find a new place for her to stay at, instead of Arlesburgh with Skiff, Harwick with Daisy, or Tidmouth with its bustling people, only to fix up an old windmill on Thomas' Branch Line into her new, energy-efficient workshop.
| 579 | 18 | "The Inventor's Spectacular Bridge" | Ian Cherry | David Stoten | 13 January 2021 | 72a |
When the Rickety Old Bridge on Toby's line collapses, trapping Toby and Henrietta on the other side of the ravine. After Ruth builds the Whistle Clock, she is asked by Thomas and Sir Topham Hatt to help build a new one, which came in the form of the Walking Bridge.
| 580 | 19 | "Yong Bao and the Tiger" | Ian Cherry | Ian McCue & David Stoten | 14 January 2021 | 72b |
Yong Bao tells Thomas the story of how he came to have a magnificent tiger emblem on his tender after seeing a majestic tiger in the shunting yards, and a few months later, saved one of the Mean Engines who used to tease him from falling off a snowy cliff, with the tiger's help.
| 581 | 20 | "Gordon and Rebecca, Coming Through!" | Ian Cherry | Davey Moore | 15 January 2021 | 73a |
Gordon and Rebecca do the same work, but they go about it differently. When Rebecca tries to be more like Gordon passing through with Henrietta, Diesel with the Troublesome Trucks, and Gordon himself with a goods train, Gordon derails and admits that Rebecca was right to do her own way.
| 582 | 21 | "Kenji on the Rails Again" | Ian Cherry | Paul Larson & Laura Beaumont | 18 January 2021 | 73b |
| 583 | 22 | "Cleo the Road Engine" | Ian Cherry | Paul Larson & Laura Beaumont | 19 January 2021 | 74a |
When Ruth's new car, Cleo, takes to the rails to race Thomas, she soon discovers why she is designed to stick to the roads.
| 584 | 23 | "Thomas' Animal Friends" | Ian Cherry | Davey Moore | 20 January 2021 | 75b |
Thomas is asked to help at the animal park for the day and realises there's more to the job than he first thought.
