= Memorial to the Missing =

Memorial to the Missing may refer to any of the following monuments:

- The Cambrai Memorial to the Missing (also known as the Louverval Memorial), at Louverval, France
- The Thiepval Memorial (fully the Thiepval Memorial to the Missing of the Somme), near the village of Thiepval, Picardy in France
- The Ploegsteert Memorial to the Missing, near Ypres, Belgium
- Tyne Cot (fully the Tyne Cot Commonwealth War Graves Cemetery and Memorial to the Missing), near Passendale, Belgium
- The West Coast Memorial to the Missing of World War II, near San Francisco, California, United States
- The Menin Gate (fully the Menin Gate Memorial to the Missing), in Ypres, Belgium
- The La Ferté-sous-Jouarre memorial (also known as the Memorial to the Missing of the Marne), La Ferté-sous-Jouarre, France
- The Ramleh Commonwealth War Graves Commission Cemetery (fully the Ramleh Commonwealth War Graves Commission Cemetery and Memorial to the Missing), near Ramla, Israel

== See also ==
- List of Commonwealth War Graves Commission World War I memorials to the missing in Belgium and France
- Memorials to the Missing, BBC radio play
