= Thomas & Friends series 17 =

Season of television series

Thomas & Friends
- Series 17
- Official cover art for the series 17 DVD
- No. of episodes: 26

Release
- Original network: Channel 5
- Original release: 3 June 2013 – 21 November 2014

Series chronology
- ← Previous; Series 16 Next → Series 18

Thomas & Friends is a children's television series about the engines and other characters working on the railways of the Island of Sodor, and is based on The Railway Series books written by Wilbert Awdry.

This article lists and details episodes from the seventeenth series of the show, which was first broadcast from 2013 to 2014.

== Production ==
During production of the sixteenth series, Sharon Miller stepped down as head writer, and Andrew Brenner, formerly head writer for Fireman Sam, was appointed as her successor. Brenner already had a previous history with the brand, having adapted the first two series and subsequently written several original stories for the Thomas the Tank Engine & Friends magazine, published by Marvel Comics from 1987 until the early 1990s. Many of his stories were later adapted by Britt Allcroft and David Mitton for the third series (plus a further one for the fifth) without his knowledge or consent.

This also marked the first series since the fifth to include a railway consultant as part of the production team, with Sam Wilkinson in the role.

This series was narrated by Mark Moraghan for audiences in the United Kingdom and United States; this was his first series as narrator.

The CGI animation for the 11-minute episodes of series 17 and the one-hour special feature was taken over by Arc Productions. The visual effects and animation had previously been handled by Nitrogen Studios.

In April 2013, Lionsgate released the DVD "Railway Mischief", which featured five episodes from the new series (episodes 4, 1, 2, 3 & 6) months before they were broadcast on television. The DVD was available exclusively at Walmart.

== Episodes ==
No. overall	No. in series	Title	Directed by	Written by	Original release date	TV Order
389	1	"Kevin's Cranky Friend"	David Baas	Lee Pressman	3 June 2013	1001a
When Cranky is overworked, Kevin is sent to help but Cranky refuses to work with him.
390	2	"Scruff's Makeover"	David Baas	Lee Pressman	4 June 2013	1001b
After being sent to be cleaned and repainted, Scruff doesn't want to work at the waste dump with Whiff, knowing he will just get dirty again.
391	3	"Wayward Winston"	David Baas	Lee Pressman	5 June 2013	1002a
After Winston's brake isn't put on, he begins to roll away down the line without a driver. He enjoys it at first, but he soon realizes why he needs to have a driver like Sir Topham Hatt.
392	4	"Gordon Runs Dry"	David Baas	Andrew Brenner	6 June 2013	1002b
When Gordon leaves with the express down the mainline, a stone from Paxton's goods train hits his boiler, causing a leak and making himself stop at every water tower.
393	5	"Calm Down Caitlin"	David Baas	Davey Moore	7 June 2013	1003a
Caitlin spends a night on Sodor while the bridge that connects the island with the Mainland is being repaired. She helps take Percy's mail train, but doesn't understand the virtues of being quiet at night.
394	6	"Steamie Stafford"	David Baas	Laura Beaumont & Paul Larson	10 June 2013	1003b
Upset that he does not make much noise being an electric engine, Stafford starts imitating a steam engine.
395	7	"Henry's Hero"	David Baas	Laura Beaumont & Paul Larson	11 June 2013	1004a
Henry and Hiro take on some bad coal and start puffing black smoke. Hiro must figure out how to deliver the loads while Henry waits for new coal in the shed.
396	8	"Luke's New Friend"	David Baas	Davey Moore	12 June 2013	1004b
Up at the Blue Mountain Quarry, Luke finds a scared young deer, so he tries to get the other engines to work quietly. However, that is not an easy thing to do.
397	9	"The Switch"	David Baas	Davey Moore	13 June 2013	1005a
When Luke is sent to Ulfstead Castle to deliver stone, he meets Millie, the Earl's private narrow gauge engine. They decide to switch jobs for the day.
398	10	"Not Now, Charlie!"	David Baas	Davey Moore	14 June 2013	1005b
Charlie is a small purple saddle tank engine who likes to tell jokes. One day Charlie discovers an elephant on the line and tries to alert the other engines, but they are convinced that Charlie is telling another one of his jokes again, and don't believe him.
399	11	"The Lost Puff"	David Baas	Davey Moore	30 September 2013	1006a
When Paxton the Diesel overhears Toby saying that Thomas has lost his puff, he misunderstands and heads off across the Island of Sodor to look for it!
400	12	"The Thomas Way"	David Baas	Laura Beaumont & Paul Larson	1 October 2013	1006b
Thomas and Duck must learn how to work together when they help Harold after he breaks down near Callan Castle. However, their issues with working together soon lead to trouble in the tunnel.
401	13	"The Phantom Express"	David Baas	Laura Beaumont & Paul Larson	2 October 2013	1007a
On a foggy night, James ends up causing Percy, Stephen, and himself to have an accident when they get stranded at Ulfstead Castle.
402	14	"Percy's Lucky Day"	David Baas	Davey Moore	3 October 2013	1007b
A couple of mishaps involving a torn sack of mail and some cargo on the line from Bill and Ben make Percy feel that he is unlucky, so Stephen lends Percy a lucky charm to get him back on the right track, but he loses it.
403	15	"Bill or Ben?"	David Baas	Andrew Brenner	4 October 2013	1008a
A new streamlined tender engine called Connor arrives on Sodor, but when Bill and Ben see him for the first time they decide to play a trick on him by challenging him to a race.
404	16	"Too Many Fire Engines"	David Baas	Andrew Brenner	5 November 2013	1008b
When a team of railway inspectors come to the Island of Sodor, they question whether Sir Topham Hatt needs two fire engines. This causes concern for Sodor's firefighting team, Flynn and Belle.
405	17	"No Snow for Thomas"	David Baas	Laura Beaumont & Paul Larson	23 December 2013	1009a
Thomas hides his snow plow because he thinks he does not need it. But he soon pays the price when he ends up stranded with Emily, Sir Topham Hatt, Annie and Clarabel during a snowstorm.
406	18	"Santa's Little Engine"	David Baas	Andrew Brenner	24 December 2013	1009b
Thomas is sent to bring a sleigh for Sir Topham Hatt to use when he plays Santa at the Ulfstead Castle Christmas Fair. When the sleigh accidentally slips down the hill, Thomas must rescue the sleigh with Sir Topham Hatt in it!
407	19	"The Missing Christmas Decorations"	David Baas	Andrew Brenner	25 December 2013	1010a
When the diesels are left out of the Christmas spirit since the Dieselworks has no decorations, Diesel 10 heads off to take some from Tidmouth Sheds.
408	20	"The Frozen Turntable"	David Baas	Andrew Brenner	26 December 2013	1010b
One cold evening, the steam engines return to Tidmouth Sheds to discover that the turntable is frozen stuck, so the engines cannot reach their berths. Gordon sees himself as being important to have the lone berth, but it soon leads to trouble.
409	21	"Away from the Sea"	David Baas	Andrew Brenner	5 July 2014 (Note: This episode was first released on the Spills & Thrills DVD on 31 March 2014.)	1011a
When Salty the Dockside Diesel develops engine troubles he worries he will be sent away from the docks. When a new steam engine, Porter arrives to help out, Salty becomes convinced that Porter has been sent to replace him.: The flashback events of Salty's Secret were recreated.
410	22	"Gone Fishing"	David Baas	Andrew Brenner	5 July 2014	1011b
Bill and Ben tease Harvey at the docks by stating that he can use his hook for fishing. It's not until an accident with his goods train proves that what the twins said was right.
411	23	"The Afternoon Tea Express"	David Baas	Laura Beaumont & Paul Larson	6 July 2014	1012a
Stephen is bringing ingredients for tea for the Earl at Ulfstead Castle. However, after Spencer teases him for being old and slow, Stephen wants to prove to him that he can be fast again. However, he soon learns that this isn't exactly easy for what he is delivering.
412	24	"The Smelly Kipper"	David Baas	Andrew Brenner	6 July 2014	1012b
When James teases Percy about being scared in the dark, Henry challenges him to take "The Flying Kipper" that night.
413	25	"No More Mr. Nice Engine"	David Baas	Laura Beaumont & Paul Larson	21 November 2014	1013a
Diesel proves to be quite troublesome for Hiro after he bashes his trucks and sends milk flying all over Sir Topham Hatt's trousers.
414	26	"Thomas' Shortcut"	David Baas	Andrew Brenner	21 November 2014	1013b
When Bertie is rerouted, Thomas attempts to find a shortcut to win his race with him; but soon learns why it's important to stick to the branch line after an accident.

== Voice cast ==
David Menkin and Jonathan Broadbent join the cast, along with Bob Golding, Jonathan Forbes, Rebecca O'Mara, Miranda Raison and Mike Grady from that year's special.

Following the number of departures for the previous year, Martin Sherman took over role of Diesel in the US, Keith Wickham took over the role of Bertie, Ben Small took over the role of Flynn, Steven Kynman took over the role of Butch in the US and Dart, and Teresa Gallagher takes over the role of Mavis in the US while David Bedella officially takes over the role of Victor in the UK.

Actor/Actress	Region	Role(s)
Mark Moraghan	UK/US	The Narrator
Ben Small	UK/US	Rheneas, Flynn, Owen and the Troublesome Trucks
Ben Small	UK	Thomas and Toby
Ben Small	UK	Charlie
Keith Wickham	US	Edward, Henry, Gordon, James, Percy, Whiff, Harold, the Fat Controller, the Wellsworth Station worker and a workman
Keith Wickham	UK	Harvey, Salty, Den, Norman, Stafford, Skarloey, Sir Handel, Bertie, a Railway Inspector, and the Maron Station Speaker
Kerry Shale	UK	Diesel and The Zookeeper
Kerry Shale	UK	Some groaning passengers ("Calm Down Caitlin")
Kerry Shale	UK	A Railway Inspector
Teresa Gallagher	UK	Emily, children, The Blond Haired Boy, The Schoolboy, and The Blonde Haired Girl
Teresa Gallagher	UK	Belle, Mavis, Annie, Clarabel, The Shouting Little Boy, The Ginger Haired Boy, Lady Hatt ("The Afternoon Tea Express" only), and The Duchess of Boxford ("Percy's Lucky Day" only)
Matt Wilkinson	UK	Spencer, Charlie, Scruff, Rocky, Cranky, Butch, Kevin, Farmer McColl, the Dock Manager and The Zoo Keeper
Matt Wilkinson	UK	Winston, Rusty, Diesel 10 and Merrick
David Bedella	UK	Victor
David Bedella	UK	Porter
Michael Legge	UK	Luke
Mike Grady	UK	Sir Robert Norramby
