= Ben Small =

Ben Small may refer to:

- Ben Small (actor), British voice actor
- Ben Small (politician), Australian politician
