= Tank engine (disambiguation) =

A tank engine is a steam locomotive which carries its water in one or more on-board water tanks, instead of a more traditional tender.

Tank engine may also refer to:

- Thomas the Tank Engine, an anthropomorphised fictional tank engine.
- The engine of a military tank.
- Edward the Tank Engine, an 2027 television series release.
