= Stuck on You =

Stuck on You may refer to:

== Film and television ==
- Stuck on You!, a 1982 comedy film by Troma
- Stuck on You (film), a 2003 comedy by the Farrelly brothers
- "Stuck on You" (CSI: NY), an episode of the TV series CSI: NY
- "Stuck on You", a Thomas & Friends series 15 episode starring Butch the Breakdown Lorry

== Music ==
- "Stuck on You" (Elvis Presley song)
- "Stuck on You" (Lionel Richie song), also covered by 3T
- "Stuck on You" (Yuna Ito song)
- "Stuck on You" (Failure song), also covered by Paramore.
- "Stuck on You", a song by Meiko from The Bright Side
- Stuck on You (album), an album by Bobby Caldwell
