= Nigel Pilkington =

British actor

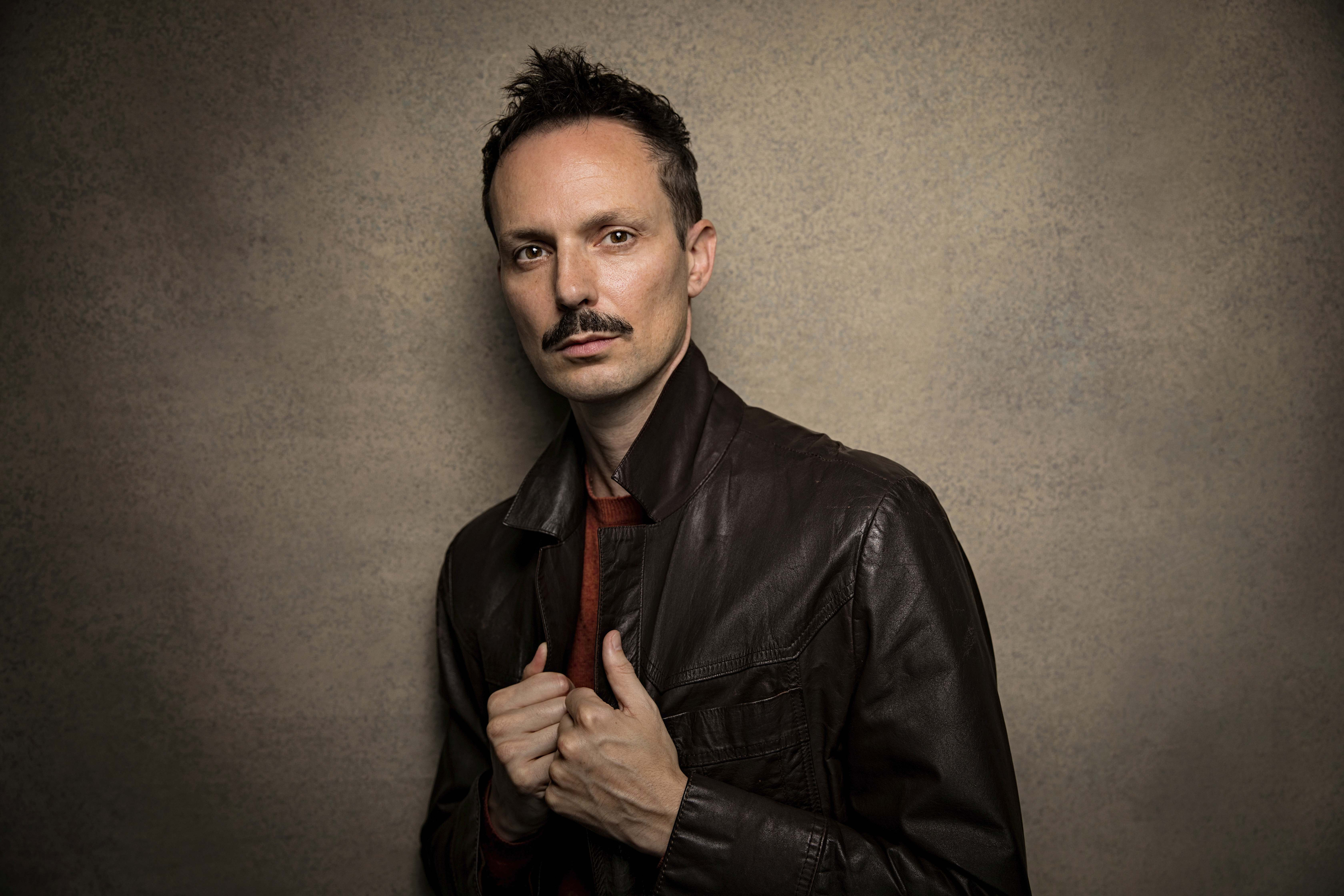
- Occupation: Actor
- Years active: 2005–present

Nigel Pilkington is a British actor.

== Career ==
Pilkington has appeared in various television programs and films such as Slow Horses, El Turco, Ant & Dec's Saturday Night Takeaway, Doctors (2000 TV series), The King's Man and Richard Hammond's Secret Service.

As a voice actor, Pilkington has provided many voices for animated films like Wallace & Gromit: The Curse of the Were-Rabbit and Azur & Asmar: The Princes' Quest, television shows like Chico Bon Bon: Monkey with a Tool Belt, The Jungle Book and Peter Rabbit and also the video games Xenoblade Chronicles 3, Final Fantasy XIV and Ni no Kuni: Wrath of the White Witch.

He plays Peeves the Poltergeist in Harry Potter: The Full-Cast Audio Editions.

He fronted the Tesco Clubcard 30th Anniversary campaign, and from series 19 to series 24, he voiced Percy and Trevor in the UK dub of Thomas & Friends. Pilkington will also return to the franchise and voice James the Red Engine in the upcoming television series Thomas & Friends: Railway Stories.

Pilkington directed, produced and wrote the short films Alone in 2011, and "That's The Spirit" in 2014.

He co-wrote, directed and produced the mockumentary podcast series Dying Breeds, released in 2020.

== Filmography ==
=== Film ===
Year	Title	Role	Notes
2005	The Brothers Grimm	Various	
2005	Wallace & Gromit: The Curse of the Were-Rabbit	Additional voices	
2006	Azur & Asmar: The Princes' Quest	Asmar	Voice
2006	Casino Royale	Croupier	
2007	Nobody's Perfect	Neil	
2009	Awaydays	Various	
2011	Alone	Various	
2012	Thinking Inside the Box	Darrel	
2012	Cold Warrior	Commentator	Voice
2013	The Jungle Book: Return 2 the Jungle	Tabaqui	Voice, direct-to-video
2016	Thomas & Friends: The Great Race	Percy	Voice, UK dub
2017	Thomas & Friends: Journey Beyond Sodor	Percy	Voice, UK dub
2018	Thomas & Friends: Big World! Big Adventures!	Percy	Voice, UK dub

=== Television ===
Year	Title	Role	Notes
2004	Cutting It	Compere	Episode #3.6
2005	The Adventures of Bottle Top Bill and His Best Friend Corky	Ned, JoJo, Swift K.I.D., Tricky	Voice
2007	A Room with a View	Various	Television film
2008	Trial & Retribution	Various	Episode: "The Rules of the Game"
2008	Masterpiece	Various	Episode "A Room with a View"
2008	Burn Up	Various	Episode #1.1
2008	Roman Mysteries	Various	Episode: "The Slave Girl from Jerusalem"
2008	The Commander: Abduction	Additional voices	Television film
2009	The Tudors	Additional voices	3 episodes
2010–2014	The Jungle Book	Tabaqui, Rikki-Tikki-Tavi, additional voices	Voice
2012–2016	Peter Rabbit	Squirrel Nutkin	Voice, UK dub
2013	Richard Hammond's Secret Service	Various	
2014	Grandpa in My Pocket	Simon Snapham	Episode: "A Sunnysands Shelter for Bella La Belter"
2015–2021	Thomas & Friends	Percy, Trevor	Voice, UK dub Succeeding Keith Wickham as the voice of Percy
2015–2016	Wissper	Monty, Frank, Pablo, Herbert, Additional voices	Season 2 Succeeding Keith Wickham as Monty
2019	Thomas & Friends: Steam Team to the Rescue	Percy	Voice, UK dub
2020	Thomas & Friends: The Royal Engine	Percy	Voice, UK dub
2022	Doctors	Jez Appleby	Episode: "Signs"
2025	El Turco	Rudolph	Episodes 1-3
2025	Slow Horses	Dog Walker	Episode: "Scars" (Series 5, Episode 6)
2027–present	Thomas & Friends: Railway Stories	James	Voice

=== Video games ===
Year	Title	Role	Notes
2011	Inazuma Eleven	Ryūgo Someoka, Additional voices	English version
2013	Ni no Kuni: Wrath of the White Witch	Young Marcassin	English version
2016	Final Fantasy XIV: Heavensward	Papalymo Totolymo	English version
2017	Final Fantasy XIV: Stormblood	Tansui	English version
2019	Final Fantasy XIV: Shadowbringers	Moren, Sul Uin, Ghen Gen	English version
2021	Final Fantasy XIV: Endwalker	Jullus	English version
2022	Xenoblade Chronicles 3	Lieutenant Travis	English version
2024	Final Fantasy XIV: Dawntrail	Jullus	

Preceded by Keith Wickham	Voice of Percy (U. K. dub); 2015–2021	Succeeded by Henri Charles
Preceded by none	Voice of Trevor (U. K. dub); 2016–2017	Succeeded by none
