= Memorials to the Missing =

Memorials to the Missing is a radio play from the BBC Radio 4 Afternoon Play strand on the establishment of the Imperial War Graves Commission, first broadcast early in 2008 and repeated on 30 October the same year. It was written by Stephen Wyatt and directed by Martin Jenkins. It won the 2008 Tinniswood Award for Best Original Radio Drama Script at the Sony Radio Academy Awards.

== Plot ==
It is centred on a fictional address given by Ware at the opening of the Thiepval Memorial, with flashbacks to his Red Cross work at the start of the war and his struggles against fierce opposition ever since to have war casualties buried where they fell under uniform headstones with no distinction of faith or rank. It is also interspersed with actuality recordings of present-day visitors to CWGC graves and with the voices of the soldiers commemorated 'haunting' Ware telling their own stories.

== Cast ==
- Fabian Ware - Anton Lesser
- Edwin Lutyens, inspired by his wife's theosophy, designer of the Thiepval Memorial and the altar design for memorials to the missing and Ware's main supporter - Michael Maloney
- Gen Sir Nevil Macready - Keith Drinkel
- Lady Florence Cecil, wife of Lord William Cecil - Theresa Gallagher
- Alice/nurse - Sophie Roberts
- Soldiers - Karl Davies, Alex Wyndham, Ben Crowe

Other minor characters included Herbert Baker (Lutyens' initial opponent, going on to suggest the standard IWGC Cross of Sacrifice to Christianise the cemeteries), Charles Aitken (another architect who recommended a memorial institution rather than spending on war graves) and William Burdett-Coutts (MP for Westminster), whilst 'offstage' characters included Rudyard Kipling.
