= Thomas & Friends series 12 =

Season of television series

Thomas & Friends
- Series 12
- DVD cover art
- No. of episodes: 20

Release
- Original network: Five (via Milkshake!)
- Original release: 1 September – 26 September 2008

Series chronology
- ← Previous; Series 11 Next → Series 13

Thomas & Friends is a children's television series about the engines and other characters working on the railways of the Island of Sodor, and is based on The Railway Series books written by Wilbert Awdry.

This article lists and details episodes from the twelfth series of the show, which was first broadcast from 1 September to 26 September 2008, making it the second season to be aired in less than a month. Most episodes in this series have two titles: the titles from the UK broadcasts are shown on top, while the American-adapted titles are shown underneath.

This was the only season to feature the mixing of live-action and animation; by the following year, the series had transitioned to full CGI. This was also the last season to utilize the live-action model animation of the show and animated by Nitrogen Studios before switching over to full CGI in 2009, starting with Hero of the Rails.

== Production ==
=== Filming and animation ===
Series 12 marked the beginning of the show's transition into computer animation. Characters' faces were animated through CGI with the aid of motion capture animation. The physical models' molded faces were replaced by white targets with triangles to fix a computer-animated face in post-production. Static models of people and animals were replaced with 3D animations by using small, metal sticks with coloured points on each end. The animation was provided by Nitrogen Studios, the studio contracted for future full-CGI episodes. This change marked the movement of production of the show from the United Kingdom to Canada, although the model scenes were still filmed at Shepperton Studios.

This series was originally planned to be narrated by Pierce Brosnan, replacing Michael Angelis and Michael Brandon for the UK and US narrations, respectively, starting with The Great Discovery. However, Simon Spencer deemed Brosnan to be not a suitable fit for a production on a smaller scale rather than a feature-length special like The Great Discovery, and Hero of the Rails, the series was released with Angelis narrating the UK releases and Brandon narrating the US releases, as with prior series. A member of the crew brought in to direct Brandon following Brosnan's departure has claimed that most of Brosnan's recordings were "weird" and "unacceptable". The crew member also stated that Brosnan had been "undirectable" and had, allegedly, stormed out of the studio when handed a note, disappearing for several hours, on more than one occasion.

This was the last series where Ed Welch provided the music, while Robert Hartshorne continued to compose the music afterwards until he was replaced by Chris Renshaw for Thomas & Friends in 4-D: Bubbling Boilers.

HIT Entertainment's Senior Vice-president of Production and Programming, Christopher Skala, stated that the change, aside from budgetary reasons, was intended to convey more emotion and flexibility through the stories. Skala claimed that, of his focus group, even those who felt that Thomas, as an institution, should not be changed in this way, ultimately responded positively to the demonstration of the new animation techniques.

== Episodes ==
No. overall	No. in series	UK title (top) US title (bottom)	Directed by	Written by	Original release date	TV Order
289	1	"Thomas and the Billboard"	Steve Asquith	Mark Robertson	1 September 2008	505a
When a photographer comes to photograph the engines for a billboard Diesel accidentally obscures Thomas. Believing that Diesel did it on purpose, Thomas deliberately avoids him when he accidentally loses the billboard and has to get another arranged.
290	2	"Steady Eddie"	Steve Asquith	Sharon Miller	2 September 2008	505b
Edward, known for being the steadiest engine on Sodor, is told to take a brass wheel along the express line to the Waterworks, but he opts to take the branch line so the people can see him.
291	3	"Rosie's Funfair Special" "Rosie's Carnival Special"	Steve Asquith	Andrew Viner	3 September 2008	511a
Rosie and Emily are pulling a train for a funfair, but Rosie wants to pull it alone to prove her worth. Her attempt goes badly wrong, causing all sorts of accidents with the coconut truck hits the Level Crossing, the pink sugar one hits Stepney in a siding, and the flatbed of chairs crash into Emily at the bottom of Gordon's Hill, and she only ends up delivering two of the carnival trucks.
292	4	"Mountain Marvel"	Steve Asquith	Sharon Miller	4 September 2008	512b
Peter Sam discovers a statue of the magical engine, Proteus, in a siding. He decides to take it to a storytelling session without his friends knowing.
293	5	"Henry Gets It Wrong"	Steve Asquith	Abi Grant	5 September 2008	504b
The Sodor Wishing Tree is struck by lightning, so some workmen are bought in to help it. However, Henry believes they are going to cut it down, and decides to obstruct their route.
294	6	"Heave Ho, Thomas!"	Steve Asquith	Sharon Miller	8 September 2008	506a
An American tender engine called Hank arrives on Sodor and Thomas must show him around, while doing his jobs. Thomas, misinterpreting Hank's compliments towards him as insults, attempts to pull all his heavy trains at once, only for him to break down.
295	7	"Toby's Special Surprise"	Steve Asquith	Sharon Miller	9 September 2008	506a
Toby, after his friends are given important jobs and he isn't, comes to the conclusion that he must find something special. But his search makes him late for his actual job.
296	8	"Excellent Emily"	Steve Asquith	Paul Larson	10 September 2008	509b
Emily is the only one who finishes her jobs on time, and thus is called "Excellent" by Sir Topham Hatt. When this goes straight to her smokebox, she ignores the advice of all the other engines, and eventually gets herself into an accident when she plunges into a dip of muddy rain water that damaged the tracks and derails sinking buffer-deep into it.
297	9	"The Party Surprise"	Steve Asquith	Simon Spencer	11 September 2008	513b
Freddie decides to organise a winter party at the wharf instead of at Mr. Percival's house, so that Colin the Crane can join in, but neglects to tell Mr. Percival, with disastrous results.
298	10	"Saved You!"	Steve Asquith	Paul Larson	12 September 2008	513a
Thomas has to take a fireman to Maithwaite for a medal ceremony and decides to try to help the engines on the way, but all his attempts end in failure.
299	11	"Duncan and the Hot Air Balloon"	Steve Asquith	Mark Robertson	15 September 2008	512a
The Percival twins are to be getting a ride in a hot air balloon for their birthday, but Duncan, who used to give them their rides, wants to take them himself, so he attempts to get rid of the balloon, but later gets to know that the twins where supposed to ride with the balloon first and then with Duncan himself.
300	12	"James Works it Out"	Steve Asquith	Simon Spencer	16 September 2008	510b
James is given the job of taking the Troublesome Trucks of stone to Great Waterton. Amongst his train is Hector, who gives James advice on how to cope with the winter weather. James, refusing to be told what to do by a truck, ignores him, which gets him into trouble.
301	13	"Tram Trouble"	Steve Asquith	Sharon Miller	17 September 2008	510a
The Great Waterton parade is to take place, and Toby is given the job of leading it. Thomas is pleased for him, but begins to worry when he learns that a new steam tram, called Flora, must also take part. Thomas doesn't want Toby to meet Flora, so he tries everything in excuse to avoid her meeting Toby, but it later turns out that Toby doesn't want to go, but when he sees Flora, he gets more relaxed and they go together to the parade.
302	14	"Don't Go Back!"	Steve Asquith	Simon Spencer	18 September 2008	507a
While working at the Sodor Slate Quarry, Diesel challenges Thomas to a race. There is a catch, however; the engines must race backwards. Their racing results in 'Arry, Bert and Mavis all being derailed.
303	15	"Gordon Takes a Shortcut"	Steve Asquith	Wayne Jackman	19 September 2008	508b
Gordon boasts to Stanley that he never gets lost. Later, when competing against the tank engine to get to Great Waterton, he decides to go along another track, believing it to be a shortcut. He soon discovers it isn't.
304	16	"The Man in the Hills"	Steve Asquith	Sharon Miller	22 September 2008	509a
It is Mr. Percival's birthday, and Sir Handel is to tell everyone a story about "The Man in the Hills", said to be completely white. Thomas decides to find the real Man in the Hills, but his choices do not match the description.
305	17	"Thomas Puts the Brakes On"	Steve Asquith	Mark Robertson	23 September 2008	508a
Thomas refuses to have Stanley help him with an important delivery, but Thomas soon regrets it when he ends up derailing on a broken end of the stone bridge after his brakes start to fail on him.
306	18	"Percy and the Bandstand"	Steve Asquith	Paul Larson	24 September 2008	507b
A New Bandstand is being built at Great Waterton. After Percy deals with the Troublesome Trucks, Sir Topham orders him to collect Lady Hatt, but not tell her where she is going. Though, Lady Hatt asks Percy to take her to her favourite places and he becomes worried that they might be late.
307	19	"Push Me, Pull You!"	Steve Asquith	Sharon Miller	25 September 2008	511b
Skarloey refuses help from Rheneas to pull the puppet show train. So he and Rheneas couple up the trucks between them and pull all their might to take the load. Skarloey succeeds, but he finds himself in a lot of trouble, first crashing into Duncan's bunting cars then Rusty's ice cream trucks and then falling into Percival Pond.
308	20	"Best Friends"	Steve Asquith	Anna Starkey	26 September 2008	504a
Percy wishes that he can pull the Brass Band to a special concert at Great Waterton, so when Thomas is chosen to pull them, he feels bad and can't bring himself to tell Percy.
