= Thomas the Tank Engine =

Fictional steam locomotive

- The Railway Series and Thomas & Friends character
- Illustration by C. Reginald Dalby
- First appearance: Thomas the Tank Engine (1946)
- Created by: Wilbert Awdry; Christopher Awdry
- Designed by: L. B. Billinton (in-universe); Reginald Payne
- Voiced by: British: Ben Small (2009–2015); John Hasler (2015–2021); Aaron Barashi (All Engines Go, 2021–2023); Shaun Jemmett (All Engines Go, 2023–2025); American: Martin Sherman (2009–2015); Joseph May (2015–2021); Meesha Contreras (All Engines Go, 2021–2023); David Kohlsmith (All Engines Go, 2023); Kai Harris (All Engines Go, 2023–2025); Japanese: Keiko Toda (series 1–8, 1990–2007); Kumiko Higa (series 9–24, 2008–2021); Minami Tanaka (All Engines Go); Other: John Bellis (Thomas and the Magic Railroad; workprint only); Eddie Glen (Thomas and the Magic Railroad); Kerry Shale (Hero of the Rails; original cut and trailer only); Ringo Starr (The Official BBC Children in Need Medley); Harry Sparkes (Railway Stories, 2026–present)

In-universe information
- Species: Tank locomotive
- Gender: Male
- Home: Island of Sodor
- Nationality: English

Thomas the Tank Engine is a fictional character created for The Railway Series children's books by Wilbert Awdry. He is an anthropomorphic tank locomotive who runs on the Fat Controller's North Western Railway on the Island of Sodor. Thomas later became the title character of the books' television adaptation Thomas & Friends as well as its wider media franchise.

Based on the LB&SCR E2 class, (Note: Sibley, Brian (1995). The Thomas the Tank Engine Man. London: Heinemann. ISBN 0-434-96909-5.) Thomas debuted in the 1946 book Thomas the Tank Engine—the second book in The Railway Series—and was the focus of the four short stories featured within it. Upon the success of the television series, Thomas became well-known in popular culture.

== Background and conception ==
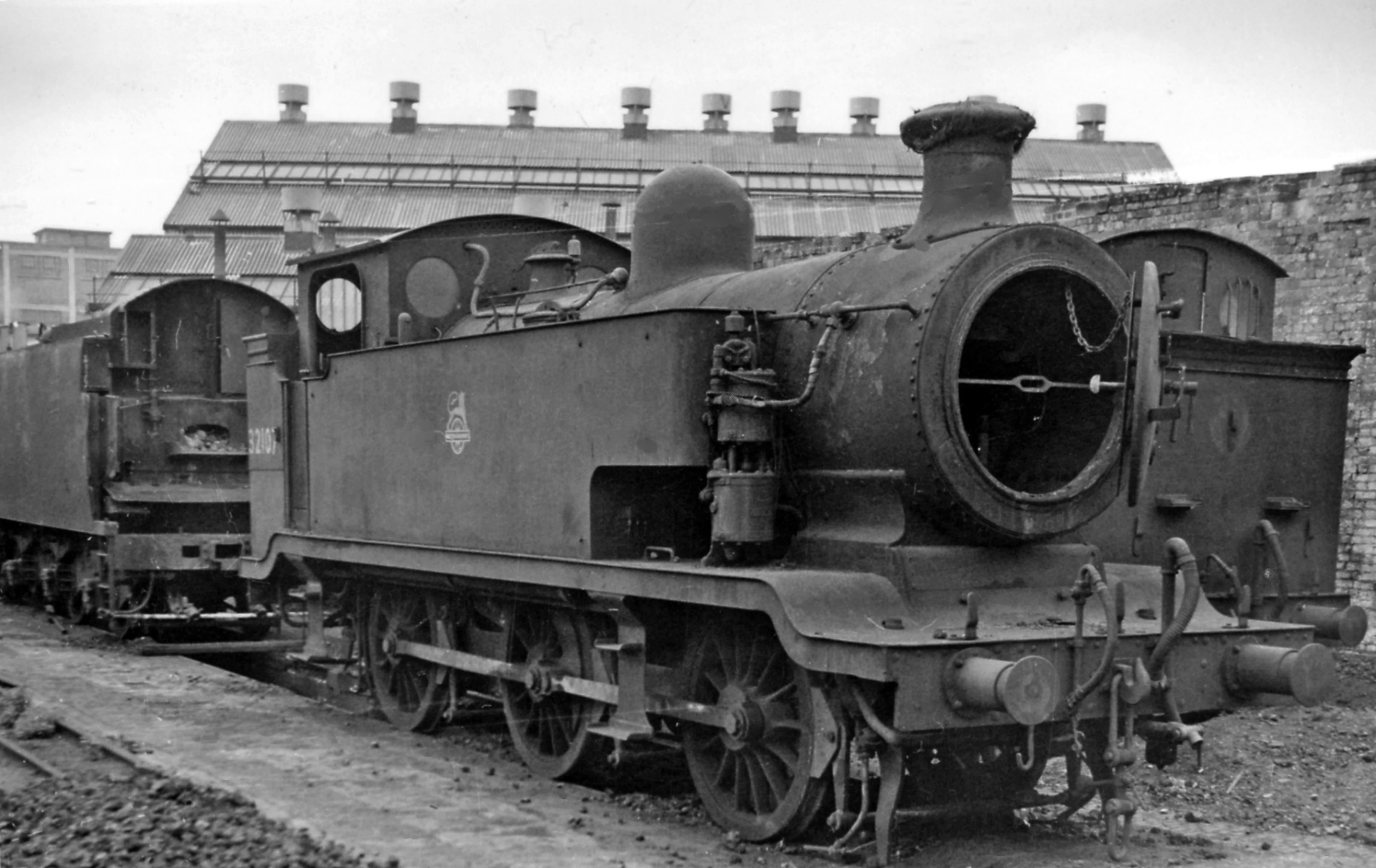
The television series and Hornby Railways based Thomas on this prototype belonging to the LB&SCR E2 class.

In the early 1940s, Wilbert Awdry built a wooden push-along model resembling an LNER Class J50 from a broomstick for his son Christopher. This model was significantly different from the character in the books and television series; it was painted blue with yellow lining and carried the letters "NW" on the side tanks.

The first Thomas model was not based on a prototype. After Awdry's wife encouraged him to publish the stories of the first book The Three Railway Engines, Awdry wrote a second book Thomas the Tank Engine featuring the titular character. The publishers selected artist Reginald Payne to illustrate the book, who designed Thomas after a Billinton-designed 0-6-0T E2 Class of the London, Brighton and South Coast Railway.

The models of Thomas used in the Thomas & Friends television series and produced by Hornby are based on the E2 locomotives fitted with an extension to the front of the water tanks. Awdry was unsatisfied with one detail of the illustration; the front end of his running board sloped downward, which meant that his front and back buffers were at different heights. This was an illustrator's mistake that was perpetuated in subsequent books. The crash seen in Thomas Comes to Breakfast was partly devised as a means of correcting this.

All of the prototype LB&SCR E2 class locomotives were scrapped between 1961 and 1963. Thus, Thomas locomotives used on Day Out with Thomas days on heritage railways are either unpowered replicas or converted from other locomotives.

=== Voice acting ===
Like the rest of the cast, Thomas did not initially have an individual voice in the English dub of the television series; the voice acting consisted entirely of narration by various actors, including Ringo Starr and Michael Angelis. During production of the film adaptation Thomas and the Magic Railroad (2000), director and series creator Britt Allcroft was impressed by the voice of John Bellis—a firefighter and part-time taxi driver—when he picked up Allcroft via taxi. Allcroft subsequently cast Bellis as the voice of Thomas, commenting to her colleagues that she "just heard the voice of Thomas" and that Bellis "is exactly how Thomas would sound". However, criticism from a test screening resulted in Bellis being replaced with voice actor Edward Glen, credited under Eddie Glen.

The television series would continue to be fully narrated until the release of the film Thomas & Friends: Hero of the Rails (2009), in which all of the characters had individual voice actors once more. Martin Sherman was cast as Thomas in the American dub, with Ben Small being cast in the British dub. These two would continue to voice Thomas in the television series and subsequent specials until Thomas & Friends: Tale of the Brave (2014), after which the former quit due to payment disputes with the film and TV series' production company HIT Entertainment.

== Biography ==
=== The Railway Series ===
Thomas was described in the opening to "Thomas and Gordon", the first story in the book Thomas the Tank Engine (1946), as a "fussy" and "cheeky" tank engine with "six small wheels, a short stumpy funnel, a short stumpy boiler and a short stumpy dome". (Note: The Rev. W. Awdry (1946). Thomas the Tank Engine. Edmund Ward. p. 4. ISBN 0-434-92779-1.)

Thomas arrived on Sodor shortly after he was built in 1915, his arrival along with a driver and fireman from the LB&SCR to Sodor is often attributed as a wartime accident. The LB&SCR wrote the engine off in 1920 when The Fat Controller bought the locomotive for a nominal sum to be a pilot engine at Vicarstown. Thomas initially worked as a station pilot engine in the first three stories in the second book, but longed for more important jobs such as pulling the express train like Gordon the Big Engine; his inexperience prevented this. In the fourth story, "Thomas and the Breakdown Train", Thomas rescues James and is rewarded with his own branch line. In the 1961 book Branch Line Engines, an accident where Thomas crashed into a station master's home would lead to Thomas' running board becoming flat after repairs. This story was written to address a complaint that Wilbert Awdry had regarding Thomas' running board being asymmetrical in earlier Railway Series books.

In 1980, Thomas would travel to York to attend "The Great Railway Show" hosted by the National Railway Museum, who would present a plaque commemorating Thomas' visit to the museum. Thomas last appeared in the 2011 book Thomas and His Friends attending a celebration of the anniversary of what would have been Wilbert Awdry's 100th birthday.

=== Television series ===
Thomas' model in series 8 (2004)

Thomas's on-screen appearance in the television series was developed by Britt Allcroft. The first series of twenty-six episodes premiered in October 1984 on ITV in the United Kingdom. The stories appeared as segments in Shining Time Station in the United States beginning in 1989.

In 1996, the Thomas stories were a segment of Mr. Conductor's Thomas Tales. The franchise's first theatrical film, Thomas and the Magic Railroad was released in July 2000.

== Reception ==
Thomas was the only fictional character included in The Independent on Sunday's 2009 "Happy List", recognised alongside 98 real-life adults and a therapy dog for making Britain a better and happier place. In 2011, Thomas the Tank Engine featured on a series of 1st class UK postage stamps issued by the Royal Mail to mark the centenary of the birth of its creator, Reverend Wilbert Awdry.

=== Legacy ===
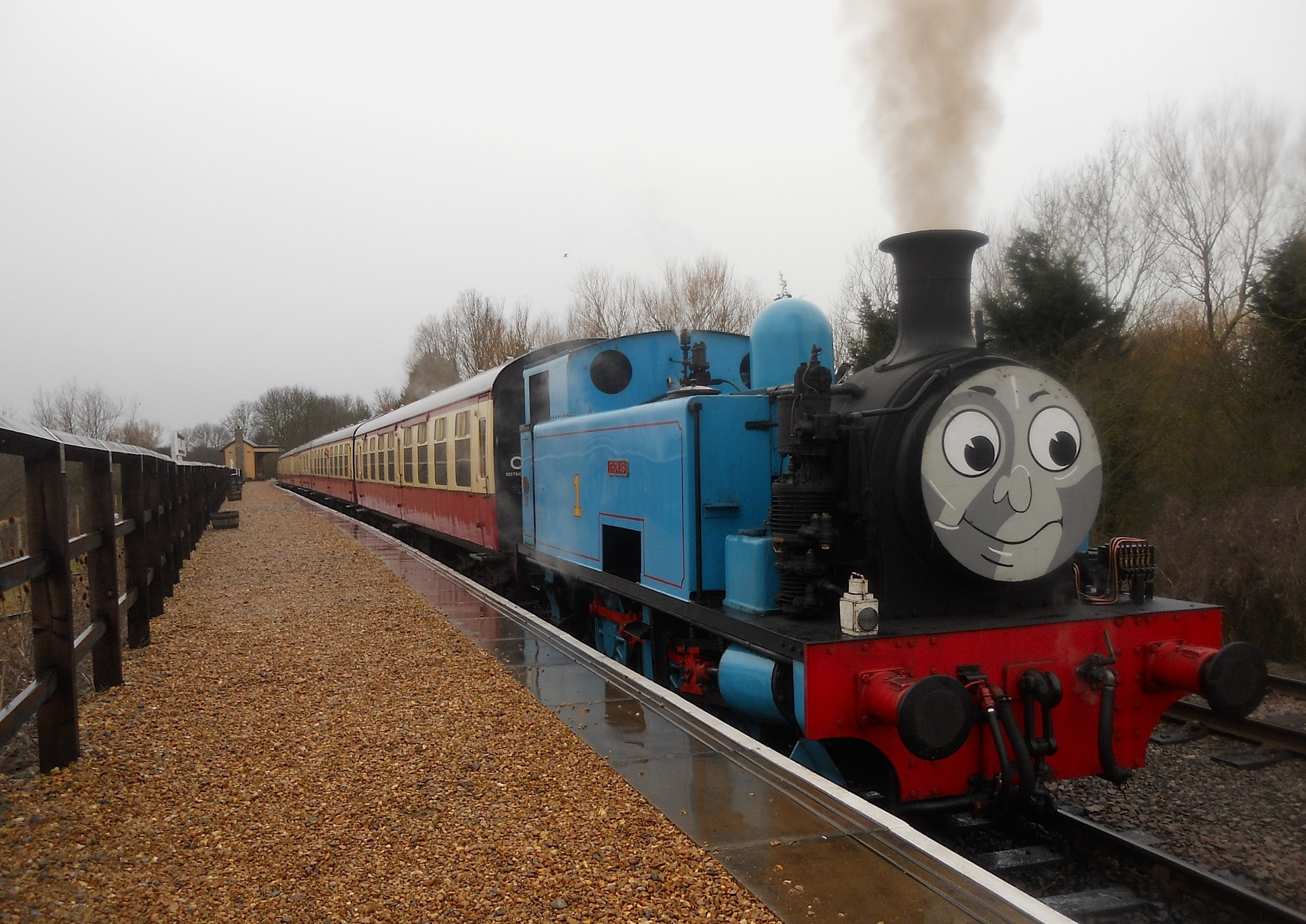
The Nene Valley Railway's Thomas the Tank Engine replica and his branch line train at Yarwell

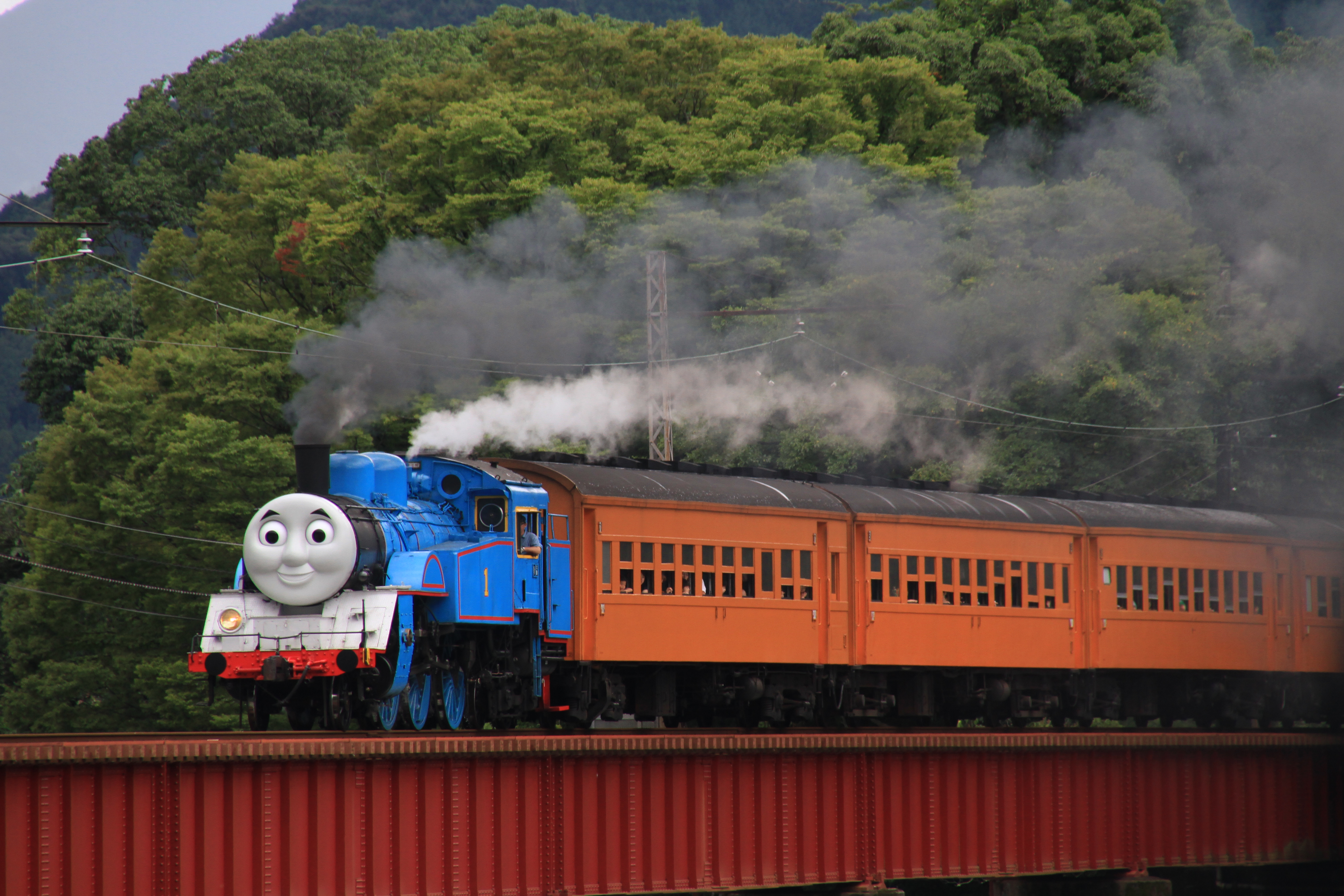
A Thomas the Tank Engine-themed JNR Class C11 train in Japan, 2014

Japanese Ōigawa Railway's locomotives include five characters from the Thomas & Friends series, including Thomas. The locomotives are based at Shin-Kanaya Station. Thomas runs between Shin-Kanaya Station and Kawaneonsen-Sasamado Station.

Thomas has been referenced, featured and parodied in popular culture. In 1988, he was parodied on ITV's Spitting Image where he was portrayed as a drunk who "went completely off the rails." (Note: Ringo/Thomas Spoof on Spitting Image (1988). 25 January 2011. Archived from the original on 31 October 2021 – via YouTube.) In 2009, he appeared in "The Official BBC Children in Need Medley" where he was voiced by Ringo Starr, who narrated the first two series of Thomas & Friends. In the British comedy show Bobby Davro's TV Weekly, a spoof was created titled "Thomas the Tanked Up Engine" involving Jeremy, a pink recolour of James. Bobby Davro provided the narration by impersonating Ringo Starr.

In Cartoon Network's MAD, Thomas the Tank Engine appears in "Thomas the Unstoppable Tank Engine", a crossover between Thomas & Friends and Unstoppable. (Note: Skit From MadTV: Thomas The Unstoppable Tank Engine. Ryan21hw. 2 October 2011. Archived from the original (YouTube) on 28 January 2019.) A parody of Thomas & Friends was in Robot Chicken, entitled "Blow Some Steam". In the skit, Thomas was voiced by Daniel Radcliffe. (Note: Blow Some Steam – Robot Chicken (YouTube) (Video). Adult Swim. 12 November 2012. Archived from the original on 31 October 2021.)

The Marvel Cinematic Universe film Ant-Man features a Bachmann-produced HO scale model of Thomas. In the film's climactic battle, Ant-Man and Yellowjacket fight atop a model train pulled by the Thomas model while in their insect sizes, until Yellowjacket derails the model train and throws Thomas at Ant-Man, who knocks him onto a windowsill. An accident during the fight results in Thomas suddenly growing to the size of a real train, demolishing part of Ant-Man's house before landing on top of a police car.

Video game players have frequently modified released games to include Thomas and other characters, typically by replacing a boss character with Thomas and using sounds and music from the show. One of the first popular efforts was replacing dragons with engines and trucks in the video game The Elder Scrolls: Skyrim in 2013, and Thomas has since been incorporated into other games like Grand Theft Auto V, Sonic the Hedgehog, and the 2019 remake of Resident Evil 2.

== See also ==
- List of characters in The Railway Series and Thomas & Friends
