= Greg Tiernan =

Irish-Canadian animator and director

- Born: Gregory Tiernan; June 19, 1965 (age 61); Dublin, Ireland
- Occupations: Animator; director; storyboard artist; voice actor
- Years active: 1986–present
- Spouse: Nicole Stinn

Gregory Tiernan (born June 19, 1965) is an Irish-born Canadian-based animator, director and voice artist. Along with his wife Nicole Stinn, he founded Nitrogen Studios Canada, Inc. in 2003, through which he introduced CGI to the Thomas the Tank Engine & Friends franchise. Prior to this, Tiernan collaborated on various projects with filmmaker Don Bluth, Walt Disney Animation Studios and Klasky Csupo, Inc. Nitrogen Studios was purchased by Cinesite and he now works for them.

Tiernan made his feature film debut with the long-gestating R-rated animated film Sausage Party (2016), joining Conrad Vernon to direct production of a story conceived by Seth Rogen, Evan Goldberg and Jonah Hill.

== Career ==
Tiernan was trained in traditional animation for feature film in his native Ireland, at Don Bluth's now-defunct Dublin-based Sullivan Bluth Studios. There, he worked with Bluth in various capacities on the films An American Tail (1986), The Land Before Time (1988) and All Dogs Go to Heaven (1989). Tiernan later worked on one episode of the British children's animated series Danger Mouse for Cosgrove Hall, several episodes of Garfield & Friends, the 1983 animated series of the comic series Lucky Luke, Ralph Bakshi's live action and animation mixed feature film Cool World (1992) and two animated feature films from Germany Der kleene Punker (1992) and Felidae (1994) which was later released on YouTube premieres on 7 August 2013 in the USA, UK, Canada and any of countries lot of views in audiences for older teens and up. Soon after, he moved to Los Angeles and became a sequence director for Klasky Csupo. In addition to working on several episodes of Rugrats and The Wild Thornberrys, he made sequence contributions to the feature film spin-offs of both programs.

Tiernan's Hollywood years also saw him work extensively with Disney. His first projects included several titles in the company's PC games library, including projects associated with Disney's Aladdin (1992), The Lion King (1994), Hercules (1997) and Tarzan (1999). Also through Disney, he contributed storyboards to Mr. Magoo (1997), one of his few live-action projects.

After serving as an additional animator on The Tigger Movie (2000), Tiernan moved to Vancouver and founded Nitrogen Studios. Through this new venture, he helped develop God of War (2005), the first entry in the renowned PlayStation game series and the animated film Happily N'Ever After (2006). He joined the family of artists behind the Thomas & Friends franchise when he directed the home video feature Hero of the Rails (2009). This title became the first Thomas project to shelve the historical live-action animation technique in favor of CGI; all subsequent projects have been animated thus. Along with helming various additional home videos, Tiernan served as series director for Thomas & Friends from Series 13 to Series 16 and the other three films Misty Island Rescue (2010), Day of the Diesels (2011) and Blue Mountain Mystery (2012). Tiernan was also the CGI unit director for Series 12. He was also a huge fan of The Rev. W. Awdry's original Railway Series books and owns both The Island of Sodor: Its People, History and Railways and Sodor: Reading Between the Lines.

Tiernan also worked on several film projects when not working at Disney or Nitrogen or with Don Bluth, including Roxy Hunter, Bionicle 2: Legends of Metru Nui and four Peanuts specials.

Tiernan gained new acclaim following the 2016 release of his feature film debut, Sausage Party (in which he also voiced a potato and a noodle soup can).

Tiernan also directed the CGI-animated version of The Addams Family (2019) and its sequel The Addams Family 2 (2021).

== Allegations of mistreatment ==
Several days after the release of Sausage Party, allegations of poor treatment of Nitrogen Studios employees surfaced in the comments section of an interview with Tiernan and co-director Conrad Vernon, featured on the website Cartoon Brew. Various anonymous comments, from individuals purporting to be animators who worked on the film in question, made claims including that Nitrogen forced them to work overtime for free and that some employees were threatened with termination. One individual stated that Tiernan had developed a reputation for "disturbing behaviour and abusive management style". Publications such as the Washington Post, the Los Angeles Times, Dorkly and /Film later picked up the story.

== Filmography ==
=== Feature films ===
Year	Title	Notes
2016	Sausage Party	Co-director (with Conrad Vernon)
2019	The Addams Family	Co-director (with Conrad Vernon)
2021	The Addams Family 2	Co-director (with Conrad Vernon)

=== Direct-to-video and television films/specials ===
Year	Title	Notes
2009	Thomas & Friends: Hero of the Rails	
2010	Thomas & Friends: Misty Island Rescue	
2011	Thomas & Friends: Day of the Diesels	
2012	Thomas & Friends: Blue Mountain Mystery	

=== Television ===
Year	Title	Notes
2008–2012	Thomas & Friends	Series director (Seasons 13–16, approx. 100+ episodes), also unit director on Season 12 CGI segments
2013–2017	Thomas & Friends: Clips (UK) / various compilation series	Director (uncredited, approx. 29 episodes/clips)
2015	Thomas & Friends: YouTube Tour	Director (10 episodes/web series)

=== Short films and web/other directing work (selected) ===
Year	Title	Notes
2010–2012	Various Thomas & Friends promotional shorts and mini-episodes	Including "Thomas and the Sounds of Sodor", "Percy and the Calliope", "Happy Birthday Sir!", "Percy and the Monster of Brendam", "Bust My Buffers!"
2010s	Thomas & Friends web clips and compilations (e.g. "The Best of Thomas & Friends Clips (US)")	Director on numerous short-form content pieces (over 100 in some aggregated credits)
2016	Sausage Party – additional voice work	Voice of Noodle Soup/Potato (uncredited cameo)
Various	Other Nitrogen Studios shorts, commercials, and animation supervision	Limited public credits, primarily animation oversight and production roles rather than solo directing
