= Mark Moraghan =

English actor and singer (born 1963)

- Born: Mark Stephen Moraghan; 27 January 1963 (age 63); Toxteth, Liverpool, England
- Occupations: Actor, singer
- Years active: 1978–present
- Known for: Narrator of Thomas & Friends (2013–2017)
- Website: www.markmoraghan.com

Mark Stephen Moraghan (MAW(R)-ə-han, born 27 January 1963) is an English actor and singer. He has appeared in the British drama series Peak Practice, London's Burning and Heartbeat. He was the narrator for the children's television show Thomas & Friends from the seventeenth to twenty-first series, and played the roles of Greg Shadwick in Brookside, Ray Wyatt in Dream Team, Owen Davies in Holby City and Adrian Atkins in Coronation Street.

== Life and career ==
Moraghan was born in Toxteth, Liverpool on 27 January 1963. He started acting in 1978, when the BBC held auditions in his high school for the TV play Lies, and he was selected. On 14 May 1988, Moraghan started his professional acting career playing a ferryman in the comedy Help!, and he subsequently went on to play in many TV series and several films. His longest running role was Owen Davies, a Consultant Obstetrician, in Holby City which he played from 2001 until 2005. He also appeared in a television commercial for the fabric softener 'Bounce' in 1996 with fellow Liverpudlian Katy Carmichael. He was recently a member of the cast of the British independent film Allies (2014).

In 2006 Moraghan starred in a musical production of Willy Russell's "Our Day Out" at Liverpool's Royal Court Theatre.

He performed as a backing vocalist and percussionist in the Liverpool band Personal Column in the late 1970s. In 2006, Moraghan came second in the BBC singing competition Just the Two of Us. His singing partner was Atomic Kitten singer Natasha Hamilton with whom he sang classic songs like "Islands in the Stream" and "With You I'm Born Again". He has also appeared on Lily Savage's Blankety Blank.

He starred and co-directed the made-for-TV film Stepdad.

In 2008, Moraghan appeared in Celebrity MasterChef, reaching the final alongside Andi Peters and eventual champion Liz McClarnon.

In 2009 he toured the United Kingdom in a theatre production of Brian Clemens' play Strictly Murder, alongside Nick Barclay, Katie Funk, David Rumelle and Miriam Miller.

Moraghan's swing album, Moonlight's Back in Style (words by Nicky Campbell) was released on Linn Records on 14 September 2009.

From 2013 to 2017, Moraghan was the narrator on the children's television show Thomas & Friends, succeeding both Michael Angelis and Michael Brandon (for both the UK and the US versions, respectively). He is also narrator for the Thomas & Friends films, King of the Railway, Tale of the Brave, The Adventure Begins, Sodor's Legend of the Lost Treasure, The Great Race and Journey Beyond Sodor. Despite having John Hasler and Joseph May take over his narration duties from 2018 onwards, Mark said that he will still work on Thomas & Friends. He returned in Season 22 to voice Dexter, an abandoned passenger coach who was found by Duck and restored as a mobile classroom. He also portrayed Mr Evans, a stationmaster who reads books from The Railway Series, and other stories about Thomas and his friends to the audience in the web series "Storytime with Mr. Evans" which aired from 1 to 7 March 2019. He then went on to return to his role as narrator as part of the podcast Thomas & Friends Storytime, airing from June 2020 to December 2021.

Prior to narrating Thomas & Friends, Moraghan has appeared in other children's television shows The Lodge and Wilderness Edge which were both dramas and both made for ITV's children's programming block CITV.

In 2017, he appeared as recurring character Tim Richards in Emmerdale.

In December 2017, Mark starred in Jack and the Beanstalk Pantomime in Bournemouth where he played the devilish Fleshcreep.

In 2026, it was announced that Moraghan will return to the Thomas & Friends franchise and narrate the open world train simulator game Thomas & Friends: Wonders of Sodor.

== Filmography ==
=== Film ===
Year	Title	Role	Notes
1995	Judge Dredd	Judge Monroe	
2008	Stepdad	Derek Watson	
2013	Thomas & Friends: King of the Railway	Narrator	Voice
2014	Thomas & Friends: Tale of the Brave	Narrator	Voice
2014	Allies	Colonel Slade	
2015	Thomas & Friends: The Adventure Begins	Narrator	Voice
2015	Thomas & Friends: Sodor's Legend of the Lost Treasure	Narrator	Voice
2016	Thomas & Friends: The Great Race	Narrator	Voice
2017	Thomas & Friends: Journey Beyond Sodor	Narrator	Voice
2023	Our Kid	Mark Parrott	

=== Television ===
Year	Title	Role	Notes
1988–2017	Emmerdale	Tim Richards / Barry	
1989–99	Brookside	Colin Lambert / Greg Shadwick / Carl Trevor	
1990–91	Waterfront Beat	Det. Sgt. 'Macker' McVay	
1991	Boon	Wayne	
1993–2008	Heartbeat	Roy Leamus / Luke	
1994–97	Harry Enfield and Chums	Barry Scouser	
1996–97	Peak Practice	Phil Young	
1999–2001	Dream Team	Ray Wyatt	
2000	Always and Everyone	Lawrence Scott	
2000	Close and True	Steve Sheedy	
2001–05	Holby City	Owen Davis	
2006	Where the Heart Is	Mark	
2008	The Bill	Jeff Bowman	
2008	Celebrity Masterchef	Himself	
2010, 2012	Doctors	Guy Harrold / Tony Mullen	
2013–18	Thomas & Friends	Narrator (series 17–21) / Dexter (voice) / Mr. Evans	
2015	Coronation Street	Adrian Mortimer	

=== Web videos ===
Year	Title	Role	Notes
2023	GTA… but with talking trains!!	Narrator	Voice; parodying his time narrating Thomas & Friends.
2023	SPIDER-MAN 2… but with a Talking Train!!	Narrator	Voice; parodying his time narrating Thomas & Friends.

=== Video games ===
Year	Title	Role	Notes
2025	Train Sim World 5	Narrator	Thomas & Friends add-on
2026	Thomas & Friends: Wonders of Sodor	Narrator	
