= Thomas & Friends: Hero of the Rails =

- DVD cover
- Directed by: Greg Tiernan
- Written by: Sharon Miller
- Based on: The Railway Series by Wilbert Awdry
- Produced by: Nicole Stinn
- Narrated by: Michael Angelis (UK); Michael Brandon (US)
- Edited by: Kevin Pavlovic
- Music by: Robert Hartshorne
- Production company: HIT Entertainment
- Distributed by: HIT Entertainment
- Release dates: September 8, 2009 (US); October 12, 2009 (UK)
- Running time: 60 minutes
- Country: United Kingdom
- Language: English
- Box office: $137,630

Thomas & Friends: Hero of the Rails is a 2009 British animated adventure film and the third feature-length special based on the British television series Thomas & Friends. The film was produced and distributed by HIT Entertainment with animation production by Canadian-based Nitrogen Studios. The movie centres on Thomas finding a long-lost engine from Japan named Hiro and attempting to repair him, opposed by malicious private engine Spencer.

The film entered pre-production in September 2008, was produced alongside the thirteenth series starting with January 2009 and was delivered in May 2009. The special marks the addition of full computer animation into the television series replacing the live-action models used previously, and the addition of a full voice cast; with voice actors Ben Small and Martin Sherman becoming the voices for Thomas the Tank Engine in the UK and US respectively.

Thomas & Friends: Hero of the Rails premiered in theatres in the United States on September 8, 2009, and later released direct-to-video in the United Kingdom on October 12.

== Plot ==
Spencer returns to Sodor to help the Duke and Duchess of Boxford with the construction of their new summer house. After Spencer becomes a nuisance to all of the other engines by teasing and bossing them around, Thomas accepts Spencer's challenge to a contest of strength, taking heavy cargo around the island. Thomas' brakes fail after climbing a tall hill, and he runs out of control through an overgrown, abandoned line. There, Thomas finds an old abandoned D51 Class tender engine from Japan (Note: In the film, Japan is only referred to as Hiro's "homeland".) named Hiro, said to be one of Sodor's first engines. Hiro does not want Sir Topham Hatt to find out about him, fearing he will be scrapped, so Thomas promises to keep his secret and work to make Hiro the "Master of the Railway" once again. Later, Thomas is taken to the Sodor Steamworks for repairs, where he finds old parts for Hiro. He takes them with permission from Victor, the engine who works at the Steamworks, only to later discover that Hiro's hiding place is dangerously close to the Duke and Duchess's new summer house. Thomas concludes that he must be careful when visiting Hiro; Spencer could find out about him and tell Sir Topham Hatt.

The following day, Thomas tells Percy about Hiro and asks him to do his own job while he looks after Hiro. Percy misplaces his own mail trucks and breaks down while doing Thomas' job, so Thomas brings him to the Steamworks. Sir Topham Hatt finds out about this and scolds Thomas by forcing him to do Percy's work. With nobody else to ask for help, Thomas and Percy tell the rest of their friends—Gordon, James, Edward, Henry, Toby, and Emily—about Hiro. They all work together in bringing Hiro new parts, distracting Spencer, and keeping the operation secret from Sir Topham Hatt while Thomas and Percy try to find the missing mail trucks. Hiro makes friends with all of the engines but gradually grows homesick. On the day that Hiro's final part (his water injector) is to be delivered, Spencer discovers Percy's mail trucks, only to be cornered by Thomas, James and Toby. Sir Topham Hatt accuses Spencer of stealing the trucks and demands he return them to Percy.

While Thomas and Hiro wait for Percy with the water injector, they hear Spencer's whistle and run. Spencer finds them and gives chase, but without the last part, Hiro falls apart and is forced to a stop. Spencer is suddenly distracted by Gordon while Thomas moves Hiro to a new hiding place. The Duke and Duchess are furious with Spencer for abandoning his own work, and Thomas asks to assist him, in order to keep an eye on Spencer and to regain the trust of Sir Topham Hatt. Meanwhile, the other engines visit Hiro to keep his spirits up. When Thomas finally decides to tell Sir Topham Hatt about Hiro, Spencer tries to stop him, but he is foiled by a rickety bridge that collapses beneath him.

When Thomas explains Hiro's situation to Sir Topham Hatt, he reassures Thomas that he would never have scrapped the "Master of the Railway", and the following day, Thomas and Percy bring him to the Steamworks. There, Victor, his assistant Kevin the crane, and the workmen work together to restore Hiro. Once he is repaired, Hiro, with Rocky the breakdown crane, rescues Spencer, and they work with Thomas on the summer house. Spencer later apologizes to the two engines and befriends them. Hiro misses Japan, so Sir Topham Hatt arranges for Hiro to return home. A farewell party is held at the docks, and Thomas promises Hiro that Sodor will always be his second home.

== Voice cast ==
- Togo Igawa as Hiro

=== United Kingdom ===
- Ben Small as Thomas and Toby
- Keith Wickham as Edward, Henry, Gordon, James, Percy and the Fat Controller
- Teresa Gallagher as Emily, Mavis and the Duchess of Boxford
- Matt Wilkinson as Spencer, Victor, Kevin, Rocky and the Duke of Boxford

=== United States ===
- Martin Sherman as Thomas and Percy
- William Hope as Edward, Toby, Rocky and the Duke of Boxford
- Kerry Shale as Henry, Gordon, James, Kevin and Sir Topham Hatt
- Jules de Jongh as Emily, Mavis and the Duchess of Boxford
- Glenn Wrage as Spencer
- David Bedella as Victor

== Merchandise and tie-ins ==
To promote the film, the 2009 Day Out with Thomas events in North America was known as "The Hero of the Rails Tour" was held at locations such as the Illinois Railway Museum, where guests could participate in activities such as arts and crafts or ride on a 15-ton replica of Thomas the Tank Engine.

A mobile app (entitled Thomas & Friends: Hero of the Rails) was developed by Callaway Digital Arts and released on 13 May 2011. Kirkus Reviews rated the app positively, commenting that it "delivers the same predictable experience they relish in video and book form, gently augmented with interactive enhancements."

A video game adaptation of the film was also released on the Wii and Nintendo DS in Europe on 20 August 2010. It was set to be released in North America, but was quietly cancelled.

The movie was adapted into a Little Golden Book by the same name, which released on 11 May 2010.

== Reception ==
DVD Talk gave a mixed review for Hero of the Rails, stating that it could be worth a rental while overall criticizing the film's plot, modernizations, and stating that it "[felt] like a poorly-thought-out extension of the series, designed simply to introduce a new format and score some cash." Common Sense Media gave the film three stars, as they felt that it would not disappoint fans of the series but that it was also your "typical Thomas tale". About.com gave the movie four stars, opining that while the film looked better than they expected and praised the film for the value lessons it imparted, it was also "unremarkable compared to every other Thomas CGI animated children's movie".
