= Togo Igawa =

Japanese actor

- トーゴ イガワ／伊川東吾
- Born: Yoshiyuki Baba; Shibuya, Tokyo, Allied-occupied Japan
- Occupation: Actor
- Years active: 1969–present
- Spouse: Adrienne Baba

Yoshiyuki Baba (馬場 義之, Baba Yoshiyuki), known professionally as Togo Igawa (トーゴ イガワ, Tōgo Igawa; or 伊川 東吾 Igawa Tōgo), is a Japanese actor based in England. He works primarily in British theatre, films and television. He was nominated for a BAFTA award in 2012 for his role in Total War: Shogun 2.

== Career ==
Igawa founded Black Tent Theatre, a theatrical group in Japan before moving to the UK and becoming the first Japanese member of The Royal Shakespeare Company in 1986.

He went on to have roles in major films such as Revolver, Memoirs of a Geisha, The Last Samurai, and A Matter of Size.

Additionally, Igawa provides the voices of Professor Moshimo in Robotboy, and Hiro in the Thomas & Friends franchise starting with 2009's Hero of the Rails. He still remains the English voice of the latter character in Thomas & Friends: Railway Stories. He also appears in 2011's Johnny English Reborn, the sequel to Johnny English, as English's Tibetan guru and is in the 2012 film Gambit playing businessman Takagawa.

His television roles have included appearances in Lovejoy, Yu-Gi-Oh Duel Monsters, The IT Crowd, Torchwood, Casualty, Archer, Doctor Who, and The Crown. In 2019 he joined the cast of BBC series Giri/Haji.

Igawa voiced the main villain Colonel Lee in the video game Crysis Warhead and the Yakuza character Jiro in the 2013 video game Payday 2. He was nominated for a BAFTA for his performance in Total War: Shogun 2.

In 2023 Igawa played real life businessman Hiroshi Yamauchi in Tetris.

In 2024, he will next be seen starring in Kyoto, a new play on the West End theatre, reuniting with the Royal Shakespeare Company.

== Personal life ==
Igawa lives in England with his wife Adrienne Baba. He studied at The Haiyuza Theatre Company Acting School and Toho Gakuen College of Drama and Music.

== Filmography ==
=== Film ===
- Kagirinaku toumei ni chikai blue (1979) as Okinawa
- The Man Who Shot Christmas (1984) as Koji
- Half Moon Street (1986) as Japanese Waiter
- Just like a Woman (1992) as Akira Watanabe
- Incognito (1998) as Agachi
- Eyes Wide Shut (1999) as Japanese Man #1
- The Nine Lives of Tomas Katz (1999) as Japanese Scuba Diver
- The Last Samurai (2003) as General Hasegawa
- Code 46 (2004) as a Driver
- Revolver (2005) as Fred
- Memoirs of a Geisha (2005) as Tanaka
- Irish Jam (2006) as Mr. Suzuki
- Speed Racer (2008) as Tetsuo Togokahn
- The Hedgehog (2009) as Kakuro Ozu
- Thomas & Friends: Hero of the Rails (2009) as Hiro (voice)
- A Matter of Size (2009) as Kitano
- Ninja (2009) as Sensei Takeda
- Thomas & Friends: Misty Island Rescue (2010) as Hiro (voice)
- Johnny English Reborn (2011) as Ting Wang
- Gambit (2012) as Takagawa
- Thomas & Friends: King of the Railway (2013) as Hiro (voice)
- 47 Ronin (2013) as Tengu Lord (voice)
- Hector and the Search for Happiness (2014) as Old Monk
- Street Fighter: Assassin's Fist (2014) as Gotetsu
- Everly (2014) as Sadist
- The Confessions (2016) as Japanese minister
- Star Wars: Episode VIII - The Last Jedi (2017) as Resistance Bridge Officer
- The Gentlemen (2019) as Wang Yong (Dry Eye's uncle)
- The Host (2020) as Lau Hoi Ho
- Tetris (2023) as Hiroshi Yamauchi

=== Television ===
- Gems (1985–1986) as Mr. Horikoshi/Mr. Jima
- Never the Twain (1988) as Japanese tourist
- Small World (1988) as Prof. Motakazu Umeda
- Forever Green (1989) as Mr. Okisawa
- Screen Two (1989) as Hiroto
- Murder Most Horrid (1991) as Japanese tourist
- Lovejoy (1992) as Mr. Kashimoto
- Drop the Dead Donkey (1996) as Mishima
- Yu-Gi-Oh! Duel Monsters (2005) as Jafar Shin (voice)
- Robotboy (2005–2008) as Professor Moshimo
- The IT Crowd (2006, 2008) as Yamamoto
- Torchwood (2006) as Dr. Tanizaki
- Thomas & Friends (2010–2020) as Hiro (voice)
- Casualty (2014) as Than Sein
- Marco Polo (2014) as Chuluun
- Archer (2015) as Kentaro Sato (voice)
- Doctor Who (2017) as Secretary General
- The Amazing World of Gumball (2017) as Mr Yoshida, Mystical Narrator (voice)
- Doctors (2017) as Akio Tanaka
- Origin (2018) as Eiichi Yagami
- Giri/Haji (2019) as Hotaka
- The Crown (2019) as Emperor Hirohito
- Thomas & Friends: Railway Stories (2027) as Hiro (voice)

=== Video games ===
- Shogun: Total War (2001) as Narrator
- Perfect Dark Zero (2005) as Zhang Li
- Genji: Days of the Blade (2006) as Musashibo Benkei
- Crysis Warhead (2008) as Colonel Lee
- Payday 2 (2015) as Jiro
- Total War: Shogun 2 (2010, cooperating with Sega and Creative Assembly) as game's narrator
- Evil Genius 2: World Domination (2021) as Jubei
- Wolfstride (2020) as Oyabun
- Rise of the Rōnin (2024) as Bladesmith's Counterpart
