= Ben Small (actor) =

British actor

- Born: Benjamin Small
- Occupation: Actor
- Years active: 2000–present

Benjamin Small is a British actor who is best known for his role as Thomas in the UK dub of the children's television series Thomas & Friends from 2009 to 2015.

== Career ==
Small voiced Thomas in the UK version of the CGI series of the children's television series Thomas & Friends. He also voiced Toby (in which he based the character's voice on Dad's Army actor Clive Dunn) and Ferdinand in the UK version while voicing Rheneas, Flynn, the Troublesome Trucks and Owen in both the UK and US versions of the series.

In the US version, he voiced Stanley and Charlie, who are voiced by Small's co-star Matt Wilkinson in the UK.

As well as Thomas & Friends, Small and fellow actor Keith Wickham previously collaborated by providing the British voices for Watch My Chops from 2004 to 2006.

Prior to that, Small was the voice of Clifford the Big Red Dog's best friend: "T-Bone". He also was the voice of Jorge/George and Shun in the spin-off Clifford's Puppy Days.

He also voiced Zorro in the animated television series Zorro: Generation Z and voiced Spuddy in Lewis and Friends.

== Filmography ==
=== Film ===
- The Hunted Pumpkin of Sleepy Hallow (2003) - Ichabod Crane
- The Christmas Dinosaur (2004) - Additional voices
- Alice in Wonderland: What's the Matter with Hatter? (2007) (BKN Classic Series trilogy)
- The Prince and the Pauper: Double Trouble (2007) (BKN Classic Series trilogy)
- Hero of the Rails (2009) - Thomas and Toby (UK dub)
- Misty Island Rescue (2010) - Thomas, Toby and Ferdinand (UK dub)
- Day of the Diesels (2011) - Thomas and Toby (UK dub)
- Blue Mountain Mystery (2012) - Thomas and Toby (UK dub) / Rheneas and Owen
- King of the Railway (2013) - Thomas and Toby (UK dub) / Rheneas and the Troublesome Trucks
- Tale of the Brave (2014) - Thomas (UK dub) / Troublesome Trucks

=== Television ===
- Franklin (1997–2004) - Bear (UK dub)
- Clifford the Big Red Dog (2002–04) - T-Bone (UK dub)
- Xcalibur (2001–02) - Herik
- Lunar Jim (2006-2013) - Jim (UK dub)
- Clifford's Puppy Days (2003–2006) - Jorge/George and Shun
- Watch My Chops! (2003–2006, 2014–2016) - Bernie Barges (UK dub)
- Harry and His Bucket Full of Dinosaurs (2005) - Pterence and Sid (UK dub)
- Zorro: Generation Z (2008) - Zorro, Diego Dela Vega
- Dork Hunters from Outer Space (2008) - Romeo
- Thomas & Friends (2009–2015) - Thomas, Toby and Ferdinand (UK dub) / Stanley and Charlie (US dub) / Rheneas, Flynn, Owen and the Troublesome Trucks
- Pet Squad (2011) - Dodge
- Matt Hatter Chronicles (2012) - Craw
- Doc McStuffins (2012) - Mr. McStuffins (UK dub)

=== Video games ===
- Zorro: Generation Z (2004) - Diego de la Vega / Zorro
- Alias (2004) - Additional voices

| Preceded by None | Voice of Thomas (U. K. dub); 2009–2015 | Succeeded by John Hasler |
| Preceded by None | Voice of Toby (U. K. dub); 2009–2015 | Succeeded by Rob Rackstraw |
