= Teresa Gallagher =

British actress

- Born: United States
- Occupation: Actress
- Years active: 1988–present

Teresa Gallagher is a American-British actress. She is known for her role as Nicole Watterson in the Cartoon Network animated sitcom The Amazing World of Gumball.

== Career ==
Gallagher is known for her role as Ellen Smith in The Bill, for her appearances on radio in No Commitments, Salem's Lot, and Memorials to the Missing. She played Sarah in Footballers' Wives, and Alison Canning in Casualty.

She presented the Children's BBC show Playdays, and has provided the voices for other children's series including The Mr. Men Show, Alphablocks, Numberblocks, and Octonauts.

She has recorded redubs for several anime films such as Laughing Target, X, Bounty Dog, Demon City Shinjuku, and Cyber City Oedo 808. Gallagher later returned to do voice acting for anime with the English dubbed version of the TV series Ronja, the Robber's Daughter.

In 2003, she voiced Amalia, the female lead in Rita Dove's drama The Darker Face of the Earth, opposite Chiwetel Ejiofor in the play's BBC radio adaptation.

In 2010, she voiced Fern the Green Fairy, Queen Titania, and Mrs. Walker in the UK version of the movie Rainbow Magic: Return to Rainspell Island.

From 2011 to 2019, Gallagher provided the voice of Nicole Watterson, the title character's mother, on the Cartoon Network animated series The Amazing World of Gumball. She would then return to her role in 2025 for the seventh season.

In 2015, she provided the voice of EOS as well as various minor characters in Thunderbirds Are Go, and also provided voices for the Voice Trumpets and the Tiddlytubbies in the 2015 reboot of Teletubbies.

Gallagher has also done various voice-over work for video games, commercials, radio plays, BBC radio dramas, and audiobooks such as several new Meg Cabot books and the 2007 audiobook adaptation of Charles Dickens' novel Bleak House which became The Times audio book of the year. A member of the BBC Radio Drama Company, she has read Radio 4's Book of the Week and Book at Bedtime.

== Filmography ==
=== Radio ===
Date	Title	Role	Director	Station
October 18, 1993	The Lake		Ned Chaillet	BBC Radio 4
March 11, 1994	Waiting For Lefty		Ned Chaillet	BBC Radio 3
1995	Salem's Lot	Susan Norton	Adrian Bean	BBC Radio 4
January 24, 2001	The Polish Soldier	Marti	Ned Chaillet	BBC Radio 4 Afternoon Play
15 October 2001 – 9 November 2001	Mary Barton	Margaret	Claire Grove	BBC Radio 4 Woman's Hour Drama
February 27, 2004	Different Planes	Annie Wyman	Lu Kemp	BBC Radio 4 Friday Play
July 14, 2004	Are You Sure?	Deborah	Lu Kemp	BBC Radio 4 Afternoon Play
April 2, 2007 – April 6, 2007	Captain Starlight's Apprentice	Jess	Lu Kemp	BBC Radio 4 Woman's Hour Drama
June 22, 2010	Two Pipe Problem 2010: Right Old Charlie	Karen	Marilyn Imrie	BBC Radio 4 Afternoon Play
June 23, 2010	Two Pipe Problem 2010: The Memory Man Forgets	Karen / Shelley	Marilyn Imrie	BBC Radio 4 Afternoon Play
October 31, 2011 – November 6, 2011	The Heat of the Day	Louie / Anne / Mary / Waitress	Marilyn Imrie	BBC Radio 4 Classic Serial
February 20, 2014 – February 21, 2014	The Exorcist	Chris MacNeil	Gaynor Macfarlane	BBC Radio 4

=== Television ===
Year	Title	Role(s)	Director(s)	Notes
1988–97	Playdays	Herself, Dilys Litefoot	Claire Bradley, Brian Jameson, Iain Lauchlan, Will Brenton, Helen Sheppard, Stephen Cannon, Adrian Hedley, Robin Carr, Leslie Pitt, Trevor Hill, Mark Pickett, Jamie Langton, Michelle Jones	
1994	Laughing Target	Satomi		UK dub
2000	Lapitch the Little Shoemaker	Lapitch, Perwinkle Percival III	Sean Barrett and George Roubicek (English voices)	English version
2001	X	Arashi Kishu		UK dub
2002–04	Engie Benjy	Driver Dottie	Lyndon Evans, Chris Taylor, Matt Palmer	
2005	BB3B	Louie	Chris Fenna/Jez Hall	
2006	The Likeaballs	Adoraball, Pam, Collectaball	Claire Grey/Chris Evans	
2007	Yo Gabba Gabba!	Foofa		UK dub
2007–08	Mama Mirabelle's Home Movies	Karla the Zebra	Unknown	Actor now Kuchi Braaso.
2008	Frankenstein's Cat	Lottie's mother, Sweeny, Igoria	Raoul	
2008–09	The Mr. Men Show	Little Miss Naughty (Season 2), Little Miss Chatterbox, Little Miss Daredevil, Little Miss Whoops	Eryk Casemero	UK dub
2008–09	The Pinky and Perky Show	KT	Cyril Adam	
2008–10	Get Squiggling	Most of the female drawn characters	Adrian Hedley	
2009–13	Dennis the Menace	Dennis's mum, Bea, Curly	Glenn Kirkpatrick	First two series only
2009–20	Thomas & Friends	Rosie (Series 13–16) and Emily	Greg Tiernan / David Baas / David Stoten / Don Spencer / Dianna Basso	UK voice
2009–20	Thomas & Friends	Mavis, Belle, Judy, Annie and Clarabel, Lady Hatt, Bridget Hatt, Stephen Hatt, Duchess of Boxford and additional voices	Greg Tiernan / David Baas / David Stoten / Don Spencer / Dianna Basso	
2010–present	Alphablocks	Various female characters		
2010–present	Octonauts	Dashi (UK Dub)		
2010–15	Everything's Rosie	Holly, Little Bear	Mark Woollard / Gary Hurst	
2011–14	Floopaloo, Where Are You?	Lisa		
2011–19	The Amazing World of Gumball	Nicole Watterson, Penny Fitzgerald, Jackie Wilson, Teri, Margaret Robinson, Polly Fitzgerald, Joan Markham		
2011–16	Poppy Cat	Egbert/Gilda		
2011–12	Fleabag Monkeyface	Gerald and additional voices	Jez Hall/Kok Cheong Wang	
2013–15	Henry Hugglemonster	Henry		UK dubbed version
2013	Dude, That's My Ghost!	Jessica Wright, Mallory Merriman, Kath Katherson	Frédéric Martin	
2014–18	Pip Ahoy!	Pip, Meryl the Mermaid, Aisha, Mrs. Snail, Aubrey		
2015–20	Thunderbirds Are Go	EOS and various other female characters	David Scott, Theo Baynton	
2015–18	Teletubbies	Voice Trumpets, The Tiddlytubbies		Revival series only
2015–19	Miffy's Adventures Big and Small			
2015–present	Mr. Bean: The Animated Series	Additional voices		
2017	Ronja, the Robber's Daughter	Ronja		English version
2017	Kazoops!	Violet		
2017	Wildwoods	Poppy		Voice
2017–present	Numberblocks	Zero, Six, Ten, Fifteen, Twenty-Five, Twenty-Eight, Sixty, Sixty-Four		UK voice
2018–19	Lilybuds	Lilac	David Lopez	
2019–24	Moominvalley	Too-ticky		Voice
2021	Elliott from Earth	Mrs. Argolis		Also sings the theme song
2021	Odo	Camp Leader		
2022–present	The Creature Cases	Peggy Scratch, additional voices		Voice
2022–24	The Heroic Quest of the Valiant Prince Ivandoe	Additional voices		Voice
2023–25	The Adventures of Paddington	Mary Brown		Voice
2023	Hilda	Young Astrid	Luke Pearson	English version
2025–present	The Wonderfully Weird World of Gumball	Nicole Watterson, Penny Fitzgerald, Jackie Wilson, Teri, Margaret Robinson, Polly Fitzgerald, Joan Markham		
2026	Love Through a Prism	Maria		Voice

=== Film ===
Year(s)	Title	Role(s)	Director(s)	Notes
2005	The Jacket	Nurse Sally	John Maybury	
2006	A Christmas Carol	Tiny Tim, Ghost of Christmas Past, Fan	Ric Machin	Part of a series of films called BKN Classic Series
2009	Hero of the Rails	Emily, Mavis and the Duchess of Boxford	Greg Tiernan	UK role
2010	Rainbow Magic: Return to Rainspell Island	Queen Titania, Fern the Green Fairy, other characters	Hiroshi Kawamata	UK dub
2010	Misty Island Rescue	Emily	Greg Tiernan	UK role
2011	Day of the Diesels	Emily (UK) Belle, Mavis and Lady Hatt	Greg Tiernan	
2011	Cars 2	Mater's Computer	John Lasseter	
2012	Blue Mountain Mystery	Emily (UK) Mavis, Annie and Clarabel	Greg Tiernan	
2013	King of the Railway	Emily (UK) Belle, Annie and Clarabel	Rob Silvestri	
2014	Tale of the Brave	Emily (UK) Annie and Clarabel	Rob Silvestri	
2014	Postman Pat: The Movie	Lucy Selby, additional voices	Mike Disa	
2015	The Adventure Begins	Annie, Clarabel, Judy and some children	Don Spencer	
2015	Sodor's Legend of the Lost Treasure	Emily (UK) Daisy, Annie, Clarabel and some children	David Stoten	
2016	Thomas & Friends: The Great Race	Emily (UK) Belle, Gina, Frieda, Daisy, Marion, Annie and Clarabel	David Stoten	
2017	Journey Beyond Sodor	Emily (UK) Annie and Clarabel	David Stoten	
2017	Mary and the Witch's Flower	Red Headed Witch	Hiromasa Yonebayashi	
2018	Thomas & Friends: Big World! Big Adventures!	Emily (UK) Marion, Natalie, Arizonia Diesel, Annie and Clarabel and Cassia	David Stoten	
2024	Fox and Hare Save the Forest	Hare	Mascha Halberstad	World premiere at 74th Berlin International Film Festival.

=== Video games ===
Year	Title	Voice role
2006	Rule of Rose	Wendy, Joshua
2007	The Witcher	Abigail, Alvin
2017	Xenoblade Chronicles 2	Queen Raqura, Azami
2017	Lego Marvel Super Heroes 2	Mantis, Medusa
2018	Déraciné	Nils
