= Down the Mine (disambiguation) =

"Down the Mine" is the 1983 television pilot for the British children's television series Thomas & Friends.

Down the Mine may also refer to:

- "Down the Mine", a story published in the 1953 book Gordon the Big Engine
- "Down the Mine", a 1985 episode from Thomas & Friends series 1

== See also ==
- Down the Line (disambiguation)
