= List of Thomas & Friends episodes =

Episodes of British television series

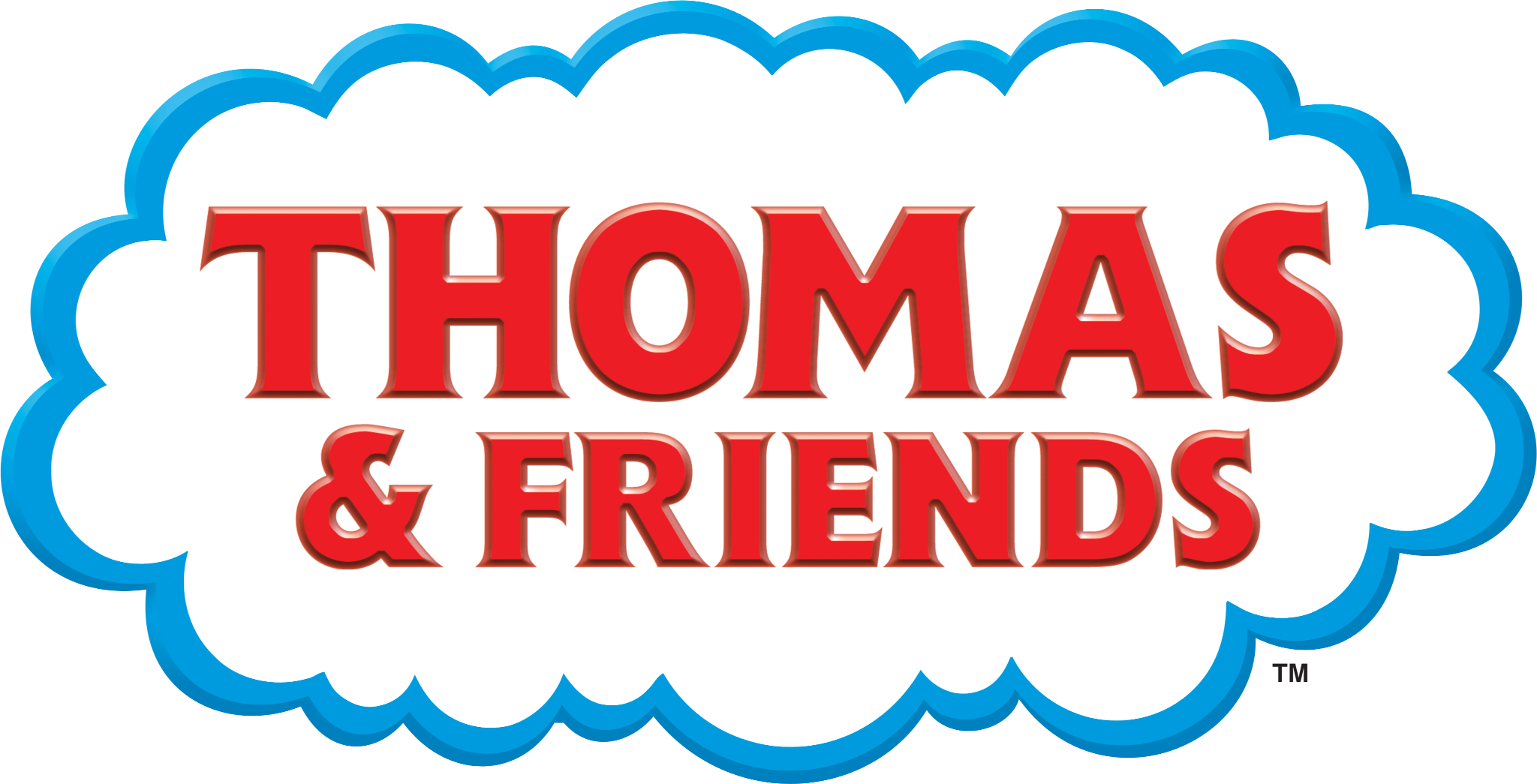
200x200

Thomas & Friends is a British children's television series developed for television by Britt Allcroft. Based on The Railway Series children's books by Wilbert and Christopher Awdry, it centers on various anthropomorphic steam locomotives as well as other vehicles living on the fictional Island of Sodor. Over the course of twenty-four series, the series produced a total of 584 episodes.

Allcroft discovered The Railway Series in 1979 during her research for a documentary film about the Bluebell Railway. She quickly became intrigued by the characters, the relationships between them and the nostalgia they invoked, and wanted to adapt the books to television. She formed "The Britt Allcroft Railway Productions" company in 1980, with her then husband, Angus Wright. She spent four years raising the funds to make the first 26 episodes of the series, which included mortgaging her house to gain a £50,000 bank loan. After searching for a proper voice for narration, she hired Beatles drummer Ringo Starr to help narrate the show, having found his voice perfect. David Mitton was hired as director, with Mike O'Donnell and Junior Campbell signing on as composers for the show's music. The episodes were filmed in live action and utilised radio-controlled models and static figures, with stop motion being used for certain characters. A pilot episode, titled "Down the Mine", was produced as an early version of it in 1983.

The first series began airing in the United Kingdom on ITV on 9 October 1984, under the title of Thomas the Tank Engine & Friends. Ratings for the series were high, with the first episode, "Thomas and Gordon", garnering 8.5 million viewers. Starr left the show following the second series in 1990, with English actor Michael Angelis replacing him in the British dub in 1991 and American stand-up comedian George Carlin replacing Ringo Starr in the American dub in the same year, respectively. Thomas & Friends continued to air regularly until its twenty-fourth and final series in 2021. A reboot titled Thomas & Friends: All Engines Go, was later announced in October 2020, with the first series beginning airing on 13 September 2021, and aired consistently until its fourth and final series, which began on 10 April 2025, and ended on 11 September.

== Series overview ==
Series	Episodes		Originally released		
Series	Episodes		First released	Last released	Network
1	26		9 October 1984	8 January 1985	ITV
2	26		24 September 1986	17 December 1986	ITV
3	26		25 February 1992	14 July 1992	ITV
4	26		4 March 1996	8 April 1996	Cartoon Network
5	26		14 September 1998	19 October 1998	Cartoon Network
6	26		16 September 2002	21 October 2002	Nick Jr.
7	26		3 November 2003	15 November 2003	Nick Jr.
8	26		4 October 2004	16 October 2004	Nick Jr.
9	26		31 October 2005	12 November 2005	Nick Jr.
10	28		2 October 2006	15 October 2006	Nick Jr.
11	26	20	3 September 2007	12 September 2007	Nick Jr.
11	26	6	9 January 2008	15 January 2008	Channel 5
12	20		1 September 2008	26 September 2008	Channel 5
13	20		25 January 2010	19 February 2010	Channel 5
14	20		11 October 2010	8 November 2010	Channel 5
15	20		1 March 2011	28 March 2011	Channel 5
16	20		20 February 2012	25 December 2012	Channel 5
17	26	20	3 June 2013	26 December 2013	Channel 5
17	26	6	5 July 2014	21 November 2014	Nick Jr.
18	26	20	25 August 2014	26 December 2014	Channel 5
18	26	6	27 July 2015	31 July 2015	Channel 5
19	26	20	21 September 2015	26 December 2016	Channel 5
19	26	6	6 March 2017	10 March 2017	Cartoonito
20	28	26	5 September 2016	31 July 2017	Channel 5
20	28	2	14 December 2017	20 December 2017	Channel 5
21	18		18 September 2017	22 December 2017	Channel 5
22	26		3 September 2018	15 May 2019	Channel 5
23	23		2 September 2019	15 May 2020	Channel 5
24	23		2 May 2020	20 January 2021	Channel 5

== Episodes ==
=== Series 1 (1984–1985) ===
No.	UK title (top) US title (bottom)	Directed by	Source	Original release date	Official No.	Half-Hour No.
1	"Thomas and Gordon"	David Mitton	Thomas the Tank Engine by Wilbert Awdry	9 October 1984	101	ITV-101a
1	"Thomas Gets Tricked"	David Mitton	Thomas the Tank Engine by Wilbert Awdry	9 October 1984	101	ITV-101a
2	"Edward and Gordon"	David Mitton	The Three Railway Engines by Wilbert Awdry	9 October 1984	102	ITV-101b
2	"Edward Helps Out"	David Mitton	Based on Edward's Day Out and the same story	9 October 1984	102	ITV-101b
3	"The Sad Story of Henry"	David Mitton	The Three Railway Engines by Wilbert Awdry	16 October 1984	103	ITV-102a
3	"Come Out, Henry!"	David Mitton	The Three Railway Engines by Wilbert Awdry	16 October 1984	103	ITV-102a
4	"Edward, Gordon and Henry"	David Mitton	The Three Railway Engines by Wilbert Awdry	16 October 1984	104	ITV-102b
4	"Henry to the Rescue"	David Mitton	The Three Railway Engines by Wilbert Awdry	16 October 1984	104	ITV-102b
5	"Thomas' Train"	David Mitton	Thomas the Tank Engine by Wilbert Awdry	23 October 1984	105	ITV-103a
5	"A Big Day for Thomas"	David Mitton	Thomas the Tank Engine by Wilbert Awdry	23 October 1984	105	ITV-103a
6	"Thomas and the Trucks"	David Mitton	Thomas the Tank Engine by Wilbert Awdry	23 October 1984	106	ITV-103b
6	"Trouble for Thomas"	David Mitton	Thomas the Tank Engine by Wilbert Awdry	23 October 1984	106	ITV-103b
7	"Thomas and the Breakdown Train"	David Mitton	Thomas the Tank Engine by Wilbert Awdry	30 October 1984	107	ITV-104a
7	"Thomas Saves the Day"	David Mitton	Thomas the Tank Engine by Wilbert Awdry	30 October 1984	107	ITV-104a
8	"James and the Coaches"	David Mitton	James the Red Engine by Wilbert Awdry	30 October 1984	108	ITV-104b
8	"James Learns a Lesson"	David Mitton	Based on James and the Top Hat and James and the Bootlace	30 October 1984	108	ITV-104b
9	"Troublesome Trucks"	David Mitton	James the Red Engine by Wilbert Awdry	6 November 1984	109	ITV-105a
9	"Foolish Freight Cars"	David Mitton	James the Red Engine by Wilbert Awdry	6 November 1984	109	ITV-105a
10	"James and the Express"	David Mitton	James the Red Engine by Wilbert Awdry	6 November 1984	110	ITV-105b
10	"A Proud Day for James"	David Mitton	James the Red Engine by Wilbert Awdry	6 November 1984	110	ITV-105b
11	"Thomas and the Guard"	David Mitton	Tank Engine Thomas Again by Wilbert Awdry	13 November 1984	111	ITV-106a
11	"Thomas and the Conductor"	David Mitton	Tank Engine Thomas Again by Wilbert Awdry	13 November 1984	111	ITV-106a
12	"Thomas Goes Fishing"	David Mitton	Tank Engine Thomas Again by Wilbert Awdry	13 November 1984	112	ITV-106b
13	"Thomas, Terence and the Snow"	David Mitton	Tank Engine Thomas Again by Wilbert Awdry	20 November 1984	113	ITV-107a
13	"Terence the Tractor"	David Mitton	Tank Engine Thomas Again by Wilbert Awdry	20 November 1984	113	ITV-107a
14	"Thomas and Bertie"	David Mitton	Tank Engine Thomas Again by Wilbert Awdry	20 November 1984	114	ITV-107b
14	"Thomas and Bertie's Great Race"	David Mitton	Tank Engine Thomas Again by Wilbert Awdry	20 November 1984	114	ITV-107b
15	"Tenders and Turntables"	David Mitton	Troublesome Engines by Wilbert Awdry	27 November 1984	115	ITV-108a
16	"Trouble in the Shed"	David Mitton	Troublesome Engines by Wilbert Awdry	27 November 1984	116	ITV-108b
17	"Percy Runs Away"	David Mitton	Troublesome Engines by Wilbert Awdry	4 December 1984	117	ITV-109a
18	"Coal"	David Mitton	Henry the Green Engine by Wilbert Awdry	4 December 1984	118	ITV-109b
18	"Henry's Special Coal"	David Mitton	Henry the Green Engine by Wilbert Awdry	4 December 1984	118	ITV-109b
19	"The Flying Kipper"	David Mitton	Henry the Green Engine by Wilbert Awdry	11 December 1984	119	ITV-110a
20	"Whistles and Sneezes"	David Mitton	Henry the Green Engine by Wilbert Awdry	11 December 1984	120	ITV-110b
20	"Whistles and Sneezes"	David Mitton	Based on Gordon's Whistle and Henry's Sneeze	11 December 1984	120	ITV-110b
21	"Toby and the Stout Gentleman"	David Mitton	Toby the Tram Engine by Wilbert Awdry	18 December 1984	121	ITV-111a
21	"Toby the Tram Engine"	David Mitton	Toby the Tram Engine by Wilbert Awdry	18 December 1984	121	ITV-111a
22	"Thomas in Trouble"	David Mitton	Toby the Tram Engine by Wilbert Awdry	18 December 1984	122	ITV-111b
22	"Thomas Breaks the Rules"	David Mitton	Toby the Tram Engine by Wilbert Awdry	18 December 1984	122	ITV-111b
23	"Dirty Objects"	David Mitton	Toby the Tram Engine by Wilbert Awdry	25 December 1984	123	ITV-112a
23	"James in a Mess"	David Mitton	Toby the Tram Engine by Wilbert Awdry	25 December 1984	123	ITV-112a
24	"Thomas' Christmas Party"	David Mitton	Same story by Wilbert Awdry	25 December 1984	126	ITV-112b
25	"Off the Rails"	David Mitton	Gordon the Big Engine by Wilbert Awdry	8 January 1985	124	ITV-113a
25	"Gordon Takes a Dip"	David Mitton	Gordon the Big Engine by Wilbert Awdry	8 January 1985	124	ITV-113a
26	"Down the Mine"	David Mitton	Gordon the Big Engine by Wilbert Awdry	8 January 1985	125	ITV-113b

=== Series 2 (1986) ===
No. overall	No. in series	UK title (top) US title (bottom)	Directed by	Source	Original release date	Official No.	Half-Hour No.
27	1	"Thomas, Percy and the Coal"	David Mitton	More About Thomas the Tank Engine by Christopher Awdry	24 September 1986	201	ITV-201a
27	1	"Double Trouble"	David Mitton	More About Thomas the Tank Engine by Christopher Awdry	24 September 1986	201	ITV-201a
28	2	"Cows"	David Mitton	Edward the Blue Engine by Rev. W. Awdry	24 September 1986	202	ITV-201b
28	2	"A Cow on the Line"	David Mitton	Edward the Blue Engine by Rev. W. Awdry	24 September 1986	202	ITV-201b
29	3	"Bertie's Chase"	David Mitton	Edward the Blue Engine by Rev. W. Awdry	1 October 1986	203	ITV-202a
30	4	"Saved from Scrap"	David Mitton	Edward the Blue Engine by Rev. W. Awdry	1 October 1986	204	ITV-202b
31	5	"Old Iron"	David Mitton	Edward the Blue Engine by Rev. W. Awdry	8 October 1986	205	ITV-203a
32	6	"Thomas and Trevor"	David Mitton	1987 Thomas Annual story by Christopher Awdry	8 October 1986	206	ITV-203b
32	6	"A New Friend for Thomas"	David Mitton	1987 Thomas Annual story by Christopher Awdry	8 October 1986	206	ITV-203b
33	7	"Percy and the Signal"	David Mitton	Percy the Small Engine by Rev. W. Awdry	15 October 1986	207	ITV-204a
34	8	"Duck Takes Charge"	David Mitton	Percy the Small Engine by Rev. W. Awdry	15 October 1986	208	ITV-204b
35	9	"Percy and Harold"	David Mitton	Percy the Small Engine by Rev. W. Awdry	22 October 1986	209	ITV-205a
35	9	"Percy Proves a Point"	David Mitton	Percy the Small Engine by Rev. W. Awdry	22 October 1986	209	ITV-205a
36	10	"The Runaway"	David Mitton	More About Thomas the Tank Engine by Christopher Awdry	22 October 1986	210	ITV-205b
37	11	"Percy Takes the Plunge"	David Mitton	The Eight Famous Engines by Rev. W. Awdry	29 October 1986	211	ITV-206a
37	11	"Percy Takes a Plunge" (Note: Best of Percy home media.)	David Mitton	The Eight Famous Engines by Rev. W. Awdry	29 October 1986	211	ITV-206a
38	12	"Pop Goes the Diesel"	David Mitton	Duck and the Diesel Engine by Rev. W. Awdry	29 October 1986	212	ITV-206b
39	13	"Dirty Work"	David Mitton	Duck and the Diesel Engine by Rev. W. Awdry	5 November 1986	213	ITV-207a
39	13	"Diesel's Devious Deed" (Note: Also titled "Diesel's Devilish Deed" in for the Thomas' Halloween Adventures DVD.)	David Mitton	Duck and the Diesel Engine by Rev. W. Awdry	5 November 1986	213	ITV-207a
40	14	"A Close Shave"	David Mitton	Duck and the Diesel Engine by Rev. W. Awdry	5 November 1986	214	ITV-207b
40	14	"A Close Shave for Duck"	David Mitton	Duck and the Diesel Engine by Rev. W. Awdry	5 November 1986	214	ITV-207b
41	15	"Better Late Than Never"	David Mitton	More About Thomas the Tank Engine by Christopher Awdry	12 November 1986	215	ITV-208a
42	16	"Break Van"	David Mitton	The Twin Engines by Rev. W. Awdry	12 November 1986	216	ITV-208b
42	16	"Donald and Douglas"	David Mitton	The Twin Engines by Rev. W. Awdry	12 November 1986	216	ITV-208b
43	17	"The Deputation"	David Mitton	The Twin Engines by Rev. W. Awdry	19 November 1986	217	ITV-209a
44	18	"Thomas Comes to Breakfast"	David Mitton	Branch Line Engines by Rev. W. Awdry	19 November 1986	218	ITV-209b
45	19	"Daisy"	David Mitton	Branch Line Engines by Rev. W. Awdry	26 November 1986	219	ITV-210a
46	20	"Percy's Predicament"	David Mitton	Branch Line Engines by Rev. W. Awdry	26 November 1986	220	ITV-210b
47	21	"The Diseasel"	David Mitton	Main Line Engines by Rev. W. Awdry	3 December 1986	221	ITV-211a
48	22	"Wrong Road"	David Mitton	Main Line Engines by Rev. W. Awdry	3 December 1986	222	ITV-211b
49	23	"Edward's Exploit" (Note: Also titled "Edward's Exploits" on some schedules and home media releases.)	David Mitton	Main Line Engines by Rev. W. Awdry	10 December 1986	223	ITV-212a
50	24	"Ghost Train"	David Mitton	Tramway Engines by Rev. W. Awdry	10 December 1986	224	ITV-212b
50	24	"Percy's Ghostly Trick"	David Mitton	Tramway Engines by Rev. W. Awdry	10 December 1986	224	ITV-212b
51	25	"Woolly Bear"	David Mitton	Tramway Engines by Rev. W. Awdry	17 December 1986	225	ITV-213a
52	26	"Thomas and the Missing Christmas Tree"	David Mitton	Same story by Christopher Awdry	17 December 1986	226	ITV-213b

=== Series 3 (1992) ===
No. overall	No. in series	UK title (top) US title (bottom)	Directed by	Source	Original release date	Official No.	Half-Hour No.
53	1	"A Scarf for Percy"	David Mitton	Henry the Green Engine by Rev. W. Awdry	25 February 1992 (Note: This episode was first released on the Time for Trouble and Other Stories VHS on 11 November 1991.)	301	ITV-301
53	1	"A Scarf for Percy"	David Mitton	Based on Percy and the Trousers	25 February 1992	301	ITV-301
54	2	"Percy's Promise"	David Mitton	Percy the Small Engine by Rev. W. Awdry	3 March 1992	302	ITV-302
55	3	"Time for Trouble"	David Mitton	The Eight Famous Engines by Rev. W. Awdry	17 March 1992	303	ITV-303
55	3	"Time for Trouble"	David Mitton	Based on Double Header	17 March 1992	303	ITV-303
56	4	"Gordon and the Famous Visitor"	David Mitton	Duck and the Diesel Engine by Rev. W. Awdry	24 March 1992	304	ITV-304
56	4	"Gordon and the Famous Visitor"	David Mitton	Based on Domeless Engines	24 March 1992	304	ITV-304
57	5	"Donald's Duck"	David Mitton	Oliver the Western Engine by Rev. W. Awdry	31 March 1992	305	ITV-305
58	6	"Thomas Gets Bumped"	David Mitton	Hello, Thomas! & A Bump on the Line by Andrew Brenner	7 April 1992	306	ITV-306a
59	7	"Thomas, Percy and the Dragon"	David Mitton	Percy's Night Out & Percy and the Dragon by Andrew Brenner	7 April 1992	307	ITV-306b
60	8	"Diesel Does It Again"	David Mitton	Trouble in the Harbour Yard & Bumps by Andrew Brenner	14 April 1992	308	ITV-307a
61	9	"Henry's Forest"	David Mitton	The magazine story of the same name and Clearing Up by Andrew Brenner	14 April 1992 (Note: This episode was first released on the Trust Thomas and Other Stories VHS on 11 November 1991.)	309	ITV-307b
62	10	"The Trouble with Mud"	David Mitton	Gordon the Big Engine by Rev. W. Awdry Based on Leaves	21 April 1992	310	ITV-308a
63	11	"No Joke for James"	David Mitton	The Express & A Passenger for James by Andrew Brenner	21 April 1992	311	ITV-308b
64	12	"Thomas, Percy and the Post Train"	David Mitton	The Post Train & After the Last Train by Andrew Brenner	28 April 1992	312	ITV-309a
64	12	"Thomas, Percy and the Mail Train"	David Mitton	The Post Train & After the Last Train by Andrew Brenner	28 April 1992	312	ITV-309a
65	13	"Trust Thomas"	David Mitton	Bertie's Bumpy Road by Andrew Brenner	28 April 1992	313	ITV-309b
66	14	"Mavis"	David Mitton	Tramway Engines by Rev. W. Awdry	5 May 1992	314	ITV-310a
67	15	"Toby's Tightrope"	David Mitton	Tramway Engines by Rev. W. Awdry	5 May 1992	315	ITV-310b
68	16	"Edward, Trevor and the Really Useful Party"	David Mitton	The Vicar's Fěte & Edward and the Vicar by Andrew Brenner	12 May 1992	316	ITV-311a
69	17	"Buzz Buzz" (Note: Also titled "Buzz, Buzz" (with the comma) in restored and remastered versions of the episode.)	David Mitton	Main Line Engines by Rev. W. Awdry	12 May 1992	317	ITV-311b
69	17	"James Goes Buzz Buzz" (Note: James Goes Buzz Buzz & Other Stories and Best of James)	David Mitton	Main Line Engines by Rev. W. Awdry	12 May 1992	317	ITV-311b
70	18	"All at Sea"	David Mitton	Original Story by Britt Allcroft and David Mitton	19 May 1992	318	ITV-312
71	19	"One Good Turn"	David Mitton	Head On & Pulling Together by Andrew Brenner	26 May 1992	319	ITV-313
72	20	"Tender Engines"	David Mitton	Enterprising Engines by Rev. W. Awdry Based on Tenders for Henry	2 June 1992	320	ITV-314
73	21	"Escape!" (Note: Also titled "Escape" (without the "!") in restored and remastered versions of the episode.)	David Mitton	Enterprising Engines by Rev. W. Awdry	9 June 1992	321	ITV-315
73	21	"Escape!"	David Mitton	Based on the story of the same name and Little Western	9 June 1992	321	ITV-315
74	22	"Oliver Owns Up"	David Mitton	Oliver the Western Engine by Rev. W. Awdry	16 June 1992	322	ITV-316
74	22	"Oliver Owns Up"	David Mitton	Based on Resource and Sagacity	16 June 1992	322	ITV-316
75	23	"Bulgy"	David Mitton	Oliver the Western Engine by Rev. W. Awdry	23 June 1992	323	ITV-317
76	24	"Heroes"	David Mitton	In a Muddle & the magazine story of the same name by Andrew Brenner	30 June 1992	324	ITV-318
77	25	"Percy, James and the Fruitful Day"	David Mitton	Percy Gets Jammed by Andrew Brenner	7 July 1992	325	ITV-319
78	26	"Thomas and Percy's Christmas Adventure"	David Mitton	Original Story by Britt Allcroft and David Mitton	14 July 1992	326	ITV-320
78	26	"Thomas and Percy's Mountain Adventure" (Note: Percy's Ghostly Trick & Other Thomas Stories, Thomas & His Friends Help Out, Thomas' Christmas Wonderland & Other Thomas Adventures, and Ultimate Christmas)	David Mitton	Original Story by Britt Allcroft and David Mitton	14 July 1992	326	ITV-320

=== Series 4 (1995) ===
No. overall	No. in series	Title	Directed by	Source	Original release date	Official No.
79	1	"Granpuff"	David Mitton	Duke the Lost Engine by Rev. W. Awdry	4 March 1996 (Note: This episode was first released on the Rock 'N' Roll and other Stories VHS on 7 November 1994.)	401
80	2	"Sleeping Beauty"	David Mitton	Duke the Lost Engine by Rev. W. Awdry	5 March 1996	402
81	3	"Bulldog"	David Mitton	Duke the Lost Engine by Rev. W. Awdry	6 March 1996	403
82	4	"You Can't Win!"	David Mitton	Duke the Lost Engine by Rev. W. Awdry	7 March 1996 (Note: This episode was first released on the Thomas & Stepney and other Stories VHS on 3 July 1995.)	404
83	5	"Four Little Engines"	David Mitton	Four Little Engines by Rev. W. Awdry Based on Skarloey Remembers and Old Faithful	8 March 1996	405
84	6	"A Bad Day for Sir Handel"	David Mitton	Four Little Engines by Rev. W. Awdry Based on Sir Handel	11 March 1996	406
85	7	"Peter Sam and the Refreshment Lady"	David Mitton	Four Little Engines by Rev. W. Awdry	12 March 1996	407
86	8	"Trucks" (Note: Also titled "Rusty Helps Peter Sam" in the U.S. for Rusty to the Rescue & Other Thomas Stories.)	David Mitton	The Little Old Engine by Rev. W. Awdry	13 March 1996	408
87	9	"Home at Last"	David Mitton	The Little Old Engine by Rev. W. Awdry	14 March 1996	409
88	10	"Rock 'n' Roll"	David Mitton	The Little Old Engine by Rev. W. Awdry	15 March 1996	410
89	11	"Special Funnel"	David Mitton	Gallant Old Engine by Rev. W. Awdry	18 March 1996	411
90	12	"Steam Roller"	David Mitton	Gallant Old Engine by Rev. W. Awdry	19 March 1996	412
91	13	"Passengers and Polish"	David Mitton	Gallant Old Engine by Rev. W. Awdry	20 March 1996	413
92	14	"Gallant Old Engine"	David Mitton	Gallant Old Engine by Rev. W. Awdry	21 March 1996 (Note: This episode was first released on the Story and Song Collection VHS on 4 March 1996.)	414
93	15	"Rusty to the Rescue"	David Mitton	Original by Britt Allcroft and David Mitton	22 March 1996	415
94	16	"Thomas and Stepney"	David Mitton	Stepney the "Bluebell" Engine by Rev. W. Awdry Based on Bluebells of England and Stepney's Special	25 March 1996	416
95	17	"Train Stops Play"	David Mitton	Stepney the "Bluebell" Engine by Rev. W. Awdry	26 March 1996 (Note: This episode was first released on the Thomas' Train and 17 other Stories VHS on 3 July 1995.)	418
96	18	"Bowled Out"	David Mitton	Stepney the "Bluebell" Engine by Rev. W. Awdry	27 March 1996	417
97	19	"Henry and the Elephant"	David Mitton	Troublesome Engines by Rev. W. Awdry	28 March 1996	419
98	20	"Toad Stands By"	David Mitton	Oliver the Western Engine by Rev. W. Awdry	29 March 1996	423
99	21	"Bulls Eyes"	David Mitton	Branch Line Engines by Rev. W. Awdry	1 April 1996	422
100	22	"Thomas and the Special Letter"	David Mitton	The Eight Famous Engines by Rev. W. Awdry Based on The Fat Controller's Engines	2 April 1996	421
101	23	"Paint Pots and Queens" (Note: Also titled "Thomas Meets the Queen" in the U.S. for Thomas Meets the Queen & Other Stories and Best of Thomas.)	David Mitton	Gordon the Big Engine by Rev. W. Awdry	3 April 1996	420
102	24	"Fish"	David Mitton	Really Useful Engines by Christopher Awdry	4 April 1996	424
103	25	"Special Attraction"	David Mitton	Toby, Trucks and Trouble by Christopher Awdry Based on Toby's Seaside Holiday and Bulstrode	5 April 1996	425
104	26	"Mind That Bike"	David Mitton	Really Useful Engines by Christopher Awdry	8 April 1996	426

=== Series 5 (1998) ===
No. overall	No. in series	UK title (top) US title (bottom)	Directed by	Source	Original release date	Official No.
105	1	"Cranky Bugs"	David Mitton	Original by Britt Allcroft and David Mitton	14 September 1998	501
106	2	"Horrid Lorry"	David Mitton	Original by Britt Allcroft and David Mitton	15 September 1998	502
107	3	"A Better View for Gordon"	David Mitton	Original by Britt Allcroft, David Mitton, and David Maidment	16 September 1998	503
108	4	"Lady Hatt's Birthday Party"	David Mitton	Original by Britt Allcroft, David Mitton, and David Maidment	17 September 1998	504
109	5	"James and the Trouble with Trees"	David Mitton	Original by Britt Allcroft, David Mitton, and David Maidment	18 September 1998	505
110	6	"Gordon and the Gremlin"	David Mitton	Original by Britt Allcroft, David Mitton, and David Maidment	21 September 1998	506
111	7	"Bye George!"	David Mitton	Original by Britt Allcroft and David Mitton	22 September 1998	507
112	8	"Baa!"	David Mitton	Original by Britt Allcroft, David Mitton, and David Maidment	23 September 1998	508
113	9	"Put Upon Percy"	David Mitton	Original by Britt Allcroft and David Mitton	24 September 1998	509
114	10	"Toby and the Flood"	David Mitton	Original by Britt Allcroft and David Mitton	25 September 1998	510
115	11	"Haunted Henry"	David Mitton	Original by Britt Allcroft and David Mitton	28 September 1998	511
116	12	"Double Teething Troubles"	David Mitton	Original by Britt Allcroft, David Mitton, and David Maidment	29 September 1998	512
117	13	"Stepney Gets Lost"	David Mitton	Original by Britt Allcroft and David Mitton	30 September 1998	513
118	14	"Toby's Discovery"	David Mitton	Original by Britt Allcroft and David Mitton	1 October 1998	514
119	15	"Something in the Air"	David Mitton	Thomas the Tank Engine & Friends magazine story by Andrew Brenner	2 October 1998	515
120	16	"Thomas, Percy and Old Slow Coach"	David Mitton	Thomas the Tank Engine & Friends magazine story by Andrew Brenner	5 October 1998	516
121	17	"Thomas and the Rumours"	David Mitton	Thomas the Tank Engine & Friends magazine story by Andrew Brenner	6 October 1998 (Note: This episode was first released on the Spooks & Surprises VHS on 5 October 1998.)	517
121	17	"Thomas and the Rumors" (Note: Back Cover & Menus for Make Someone Happy & Other Thomas Adventures)	David Mitton	Thomas the Tank Engine & Friends magazine story by Andrew Brenner	6 October 1998	517
122	18	"Oliver's Find"	David Mitton	Original by Britt Allcroft and David Mitton	7 October 1998	518
123	19	"Happy Ever After"	David Mitton	Original by Britt Allcroft and David Mitton	8 October 1998	519
124	20	"Sir Topham Hatt's Holiday"	David Mitton	Original by Britt Allcroft and David Mitton	9 October 1998	520
125	21	"A Surprise for Percy"	David Mitton	Original by Britt Allcroft, David Mitton, and David Maidment	12 October 1998	521
125	21	"A Big Surprise for Percy" (Note: Make Someone Happy & Other Thomas Adventures)	David Mitton	Original by Britt Allcroft, David Mitton, and David Maidment	12 October 1998	521
126	22	"Make Someone Happy"	David Mitton	Original by Britt Allcroft and David Mitton	13 October 1998	522
127	23	"Busy Going Backwards"	David Mitton	Original by Britt Allcroft, David Mitton, and David Maidment	14 October 1998	523
128	24	"Duncan Gets Spooked"	David Mitton	Original by Britt Allcroft, David Mitton, and David Maidment	15 October 1998	524
129	25	"Rusty and the Boulder"	David Mitton	Original by Britt Allcroft and David Mitton	16 October 1998	526
130	26	"Snow"	David Mitton	Original by Britt Allcroft and David Mitton	19 October 1998	525

=== Series 6 (2002) ===
No. overall	No. in series	UK title (top) US title (bottom)	Directed by	Written by	Original release date	Official No.
131	1	"Salty's Secret"	David Mitton	Robin Kingsland	16 September 2002	602
132	2	"Harvey to the Rescue"	David Mitton	Jonathan Trueman	17 September 2002	603
133	3	"No Sleep for Cranky"	David Mitton	Paul Larson	18 September 2002	601
134	4	"A Bad Day for Harold the Helicopter" (Note: Also shortened to "A Bad Day for Harold" for Salty's Secret & Other Thomas Adventures in the U.S. and Half-Hour Series 9 broadcasts.)	David Mitton	Teleplay by : Simon Nicholson; Story by : David Mitton	19 September 2002	604
135	5	"Elizabeth the Vintage Lorry"	David Mitton	Paul Larson	20 September 2002	605
135	5	"Elizabeth the Vintage Quarry Truck" (Note: Salty's Secret & Other Thomas Adventures)	David Mitton	Paul Larson	20 September 2002	605
136	6	"The Fogman" (Note: Also retitled as "The Fog Man" in the U.S. for Thomas' Halloween Adventures.)	David Mitton	Teleplay by : Jonathan Trueman; Story by : David Mitton	23 September 2002	606
137	7	"Jack Jumps In"	Steve Asquith	Jonathan Trueman, Phil Fehrle and Abi Grant	24 September 2002	607
138	8	"A Friend in Need"	Steve Asquith	Phil Fehrle, Jonathan Trueman and Abi Grant	25 September 2002	608
139	9	"It's Only Snow"	David Mitton	Teleplay by : James Mason; Story by : David Mitton	26 September 2002	609
140	10	"Twin Trouble"	David Mitton	Brian Trueman	27 September 2002	610
141	11	"The World's Strongest Engine"	David Mitton	Teleplay by : Paul Larson; Story by : David Mitton	30 September 2002	611
142	12	"Scaredy Engines"	David Mitton	Teleplay by : Robin Kingsland; Story by : David Mitton	1 October 2002	612
143	13	"Percy and the Haunted Mine"	David Mitton	Teleplay by : Robyn Charteris; Story by : David Mitton	2 October 2002	613
144	14	"Middle Engine"	David Mitton	Teleplay by : Brian Trueman; Story by : David Mitton	3 October 2002	614
145	15	"James and the Red Balloon"	David Mitton	Teleplay by : Jenny McDade; Story by : David Mitton	4 October 2002	615
146	16	"Jack Frost"	David Mitton	Teleplay by : Paul Larson; Story by : David Mitton	7 October 2002	616
147	17	"Gordon Takes a Tumble"	David Mitton	Teleplay by : Robin Kingsland; Story by : David Mitton	8 October 2002 (Note: This episode was first released on The Fogman and other Stories VHS/DVD on 7 October 2002.)	617
148	18	"Percy's Chocolate Crunch"	David Mitton	Teleplay by : Brian Trueman; Story by : David Mitton	9 October 2002	618
149	19	"Buffer Bother"	David Mitton	Ross Hastings	10 October 2002	619
150	20	"Toby Had a Little Lamb"	David Mitton	Jenny McDade	11 October 2002	620
151	21	"Thomas, Percy and the Squeak"	David Mitton	Teleplay by : Jenny McDade; Story by : David Mitton	14 October 2002	621
152	22	"Thomas the Jet Engine"	David Mitton	Teleplay by : Ross Hastings; Story by : David Mitton	15 October 2002	622
152	22	"Thomas and the Jet Engine"	David Mitton	Teleplay by : Ross Hastings; Story by : David Mitton	15 October 2002	622
153	23	"Edward the Very Useful Engine" (Note: Also titled "Edward the Really Useful Engine" for Half-Hour Series 9 broadcasts and the Mud Glorious Mud DVD.)	David Mitton	David Mitton	16 October 2002	623
154	24	"Dunkin Duncan"	David Mitton	Teleplay by : Jenny McDade; Story by : Simon Nicholson	17 October 2002	624
155	25	"Rusty Saves the Day"	David Mitton	Teleplay by : Paul Larson; Story by : David Mitton	18 October 2002	625
156	26	"Faulty Whistles"	David Mitton	Teleplay by : Ross Hastings; Story by : David Mitton	21 October 2002	626

=== Series 7 (2003) ===
No. overall	No. in series	UK title (top) US title (bottom)	Directed by	Written by	Original release date	Official No.	Half-Hour No.
157	1	"Emily's New Coaches"	David Mitton	Jan Page	3 November 2003 (Note: This episode was first released on the Happy Little Helpers VHS/DVD on 6 October 2003.)	701	PBS-103b
158	2	"Percy Gets It Right"	David Mitton	Paul Larson	3 November 2003	702	PBS-108b
159	3	"Bill, Ben and Fergus"	David Mitton	Brian Trueman	4 November 2003	703	PBS-106b
160	4	"The Old Bridge" (Note: Also titled "The Old Iron Bridge" in the U.S. and U.K. for Half-Hour Series 8 broadcasts.)	David Mitton	Paul Larson	4 November 2003	704	PBS-110b
161	5	"Edward's Brass Band"	David Mitton	Robyn Charteris	5 November 2003	705	PBS-113b
162	6	"What's the Matter with Henry?"	David Mitton	George Tarry	5 November 2003	706	PBS-109b
163	7	"James and the Queen of Sodor"	David Mitton	Paul Larson	6 November 2003	707	PBS-105b
164	8	"The Refreshment Lady's Tea Shop"	David Mitton	James Mason	6 November 2003	708	N/A
164	8	"The Refreshment Lady's Stand"	David Mitton	James Mason	6 November 2003	708	N/A
165	9	"The Spotless Record" (Note: Also titled "Spotless Record" in the U.S. and U.K. for Half-Hour Series 9 broadcasts.)	David Mitton	Paul Larson	7 November 2003	709	PBS-202b
166	10	"Toby's Windmill" (Note: Also titled "Toby and the Windmill" in the U.S. for Thomas & the Really Brave Engines & Other Adventures.)	David Mitton	Jan Page (written); David Mitton (story)	7 November 2003	710	PBS-208b
167	11	"Bad Day at Castle Loch"	David Mitton	Jenny McDade	8 November 2003	711	N/A
168	12	"Rheneas and the Roller Coaster"	David Mitton	James Mason	8 November 2003	712	N/A
169	13	"Salty's Stormy Tale"	David Mitton	Polly Churchill	9 November 2003	713	PBS-113b
170	14	"Snow Engine" (Note: Also titled "Oliver the Snow Engine" in the U.S. for Thomas & the Really Brave Engines & Other Adventures.)	David Mitton	Jenny McDade	9 November 2003	714	N/A
171	15	"Something Fishy"	David Mitton	Paul Larson	10 November 2003	715	PBS-205b
172	16	"The Runaway Elephant"	David Mitton	George Tarry	10 November 2003	716	N/A
173	17	"Peace and Quiet"	David Mitton	Paul Larson	11 November 2003	717	PBS-101b
174	18	"Fergus Breaks the Rules" (Note: Also titled "Thomas and the Search for Fergus" in the U.S. for Thomas & the Really Brave Engines & Other Adventures.)	David Mitton	Jan Page	11 November 2003	718	PBS-211b
175	19	"Bulgy Rides Again"	David Mitton	Brian Trueman	12 November 2003	719	PBS-206b
176	20	"Harold and the Flying Horse"	David Mitton	Robin Kingsland	12 November 2003	720	PBS-204b
177	21	"The Grand Opening"	David Mitton	James Mason	13 November 2003	721	N/A
178	22	"Best Dressed Engine"	David Mitton	Polly Churchill	13 November 2003	722	PBS-103b
179	23	"Gordon and Spencer"	David Mitton	Lee Pressman	14 November 2003	723	PBS-104b
180	24	"Not So Hasty Puddings" (Note: Also titled "Not So Hasty Cakes" in the U.S. for Half-Hour Series 8 broadcasts.) (Note: Also titled "Thomas and the Avalanche" in the U.S. for the Mud Glorious Mud DVD.)	David Mitton	Robyn Charteris	14 November 2003	724	PBS-107b
181	25	"Trusty Rusty"	David Mitton	James Mason	15 November 2003	725	PBS-111b
182	26	"Three Cheers for Thomas" (Note: Also titled "Hooray for Thomas" in the U.S. for Hooray for Thomas & Other Adventures.)	David Mitton	Jan Page	15 November 2003	726	PBS-112b

=== Series 8 (2004) ===
No. overall	No. in series	Title	Directed by	Written by	Original release date	Official No.	Half-Hour No.
183	1	"Thomas and the Tuba"	Steve Asquith	Dave Ingham	4 October 2004 (Note: This episode was first released on the All Aboard with the Steam Team VHS/DVD on 24 May 2004.)	820	PBS-101a
184	2	"Percy's New Whistle"	Steve Asquith	James Mason	4 October 2004	802	PBS-101c
185	3	"Thomas to the Rescue"	Steve Asquith	Abi Grant and Paul Larson	5 October 2004	824	PBS-102a
186	4	"Henry and the Wishing Tree"	Steve Asquith	Abi Grant and Paul Larson	5 October 2004	821	PBS-102c
187	5	"James Gets a New Coat"	Steve Asquith	Abi Grant	6 October 2004	823	PBS-103a
188	6	"Thomas Saves the Day"	Steve Asquith	James Mason	6 October 2004	805	PBS-103c
189	7	"Percy's Big Mistake"	Steve Asquith	Abi Grant	7 October 2004	815	PBS-104a
190	8	"Thomas, Emily and the Snowplough"	Steve Asquith	Abi Grant	7 October 2004	807	PBS-104c
191	9	"Don't Tell Thomas"	Steve Asquith	Paul Larson	8 October 2004	816	PBS-105a
192	10	"Emily's New Route"	Steve Asquith	James Mason	8 October 2004	817	PBS-105c
193	11	"Thomas and the Firework Display"	Steve Asquith	Abi Grant and Paul Larson	9 October 2004	801	PBS-106a
194	12	"Gordon Takes Charge"	Steve Asquith	Paul Larson	9 October 2004	819	PBS-106c
195	13	"Spic and Span"	Steve Asquith	Marc Seal	10 October 2004	809	PBS-107a
196	14	"Edward the Great"	Steve Asquith	Abi Grant	10 October 2004	808	PBS-107c
197	15	"Squeak, Rattle and Roll"	Steve Asquith	Marc Seal	11 October 2004	806	PBS-108a
198	16	"Thomas and the Circus"	Steve Asquith	Abi Grant	11 October 2004	814	PBS-108c
199	17	"Thomas Gets It Right"	Steve Asquith	Robin Rigby	12 October 2004	811	PBS-109a
200	18	"As Good as Gordon"	Steve Asquith	Abi Grant	12 October 2004	825	PBS-109c
201	19	"Fish"	Steve Asquith	Paul Larson	13 October 2004	803	PBS-110a
202	20	"Emily's Adventure"	Steve Asquith	Paul Larson	13 October 2004	804	PBS-110c
203	21	"Halloween"	Steve Asquith	Dave Ingham	14 October 2004	826	PBS-111a
204	22	"You Can Do It, Toby!"	Steve Asquith	Paul Larson	14 October 2004	812	PBS-111c
205	23	"James Goes Too Far"	Steve Asquith	James Mason	15 October 2004	810	PBS-112a
206	24	"Chickens to School"	Steve Asquith	Paul Larson	15 October 2004	818	PBS-112c
207	25	"Too Hot for Thomas"	Steve Asquith	Paul Larson	16 October 2004	822	PBS-113a
208	26	"Percy and the Magic Carpet"	Steve Asquith	Abi Grant	16 October 2004	813	PBS-113c

=== Series 9 (2005) ===
No. overall	No. in series	Title	Directed by	Written by	Original release date	Official No.	TV Order
209	1	"Percy and the Oil Painting"	Steve Asquith	Abi Grant	31 October 2005	906	201a
210	2	"Thomas and the Rainbow"	Steve Asquith	Abi Grant	31 October 2005	901	201b
211	3	"Thomas' Milkshake Muddle"	Steve Asquith	Marc Seal	1 November 2005	905	202a
212	4	"Mighty Mac"	Steve Asquith	Paul Larson	1 November 2005	904	202b
213	5	"Molly's Special Special"	Steve Asquith	Paul Larson	2 November 2005	903	203a
214	6	"Respect for Gordon"	Steve Asquith	James Mason	2 November 2005	902	203b
215	7	"Thomas and the Birthday Picnic"	Steve Asquith	Sharon Miller	3 November 2005	907	204a
216	8	"Tuneful Toots"	Steve Asquith	Sharon Miller	3 November 2005	910	204b
217	9	"Thomas and the Toy Shop" (Note: Also titled "Thomas and the Toy Workshop" in the U.S. for its titular DVD.)	Steve Asquith	James Mason	4 November 2005	918	205a
218	10	"Rheneas and the Dinosaur"	Steve Asquith	Paul Larson	4 November 2005	912	205b
219	11	"Thomas and the New Engine"	Steve Asquith	Marc Seal	5 November 2005	914	206a
220	12	"Toby Feels Left Out"	Steve Asquith	Simon A. Brown	5 November 2005	908	206b
221	13	"Thomas Tries His Best"	Steve Asquith	James Mason	6 November 2005	920	207a
222	14	"The Magic Lamp"	Steve Asquith	Sharon Miller	6 November 2005	917	207b
223	15	"Thomas and the Statue"	Steve Asquith	Marc Seal	7 November 2005	923	208a
224	16	"Henry and the Flagpole"	Steve Asquith	Paul Larson	7 November 2005	913	208b
225	17	"Emily Knows Best"	Steve Asquith	Marc Seal	8 November 2005	915	209a
226	18	"Thomas' Day Off"	Steve Asquith	Sharon Miller	8 November 2005	922	209b
227	19	"Thomas' New Trucks"	Steve Asquith	Paul Larson	9 November 2005	916	210a
228	20	"Duncan and the Old Mine"	Steve Asquith	James Mason	9 November 2005	921	210b
229	21	"Bold and Brave"	Steve Asquith	James Mason	10 November 2005	909	211a
230	22	"Skarloey the Brave"	Steve Asquith	Paul Larson	10 November 2005	925	211b
231	23	"Saving Edward"	Steve Asquith	James Mason	11 November 2005	919	212a
232	24	"Thomas and the Golden Eagle"	Steve Asquith	Abi Grant	11 November 2005	926	212b
233	25	"Keeping Up with James"	Steve Asquith	Abi Grant	12 November 2005	924	213a
234	26	"Flour Power"	Steve Asquith	Abi Grant	12 November 2005	911	213b

=== Series 10 (2006) ===
No. overall	No. in series	UK title (top) US title (bottom)	Directed by	Written by	Original release date	Official No.	TV Order
235	1	"Follow That Flour"	Steve Asquith	Sharon Miller	2 October 2006	1003	301a
236	2	"A Smooth Ride"	Steve Asquith	Simon Nicholson	2 October 2006	1002	301b
237	3	"Thomas and the Jet Plane"	Steve Asquith	Abi Grant	3 October 2006	1001	302a
238	4	"Percy and the Funfair"	Steve Asquith	Abi Grant	3 October 2006	1004	302b
238	4	"Percy and the Carnival"	Steve Asquith	Abi Grant	3 October 2006	1004	302b
239	5	"The Green Controller"	Steve Asquith	Sharon Miller	4 October 2006	1026	303a
240	6	"Duncan Drops a Clanger"	Steve Asquith	Paul Larson	4 October 2006	1005	303b
241	7	"Thomas' Tricky Tree"	Steve Asquith	Sharon Miller	5 October 2006	1007	304a
242	8	"Toby's Afternoon Off"	Steve Asquith	Marc Seal	5 October 2006	1006	304b
243	9	"It's Good to Be Gordon"	Steve Asquith	Abi Grant	6 October 2006	1008	305a
244	10	"Seeing the Sights"	Steve Asquith	Wayne Jackman	6 October 2006	1014	305b
245	11	"Fearless Freddie"	Steve Asquith	Simon Nicholson	7 October 2006	1011	306a
246	12	"Toby's New Shed"	Steve Asquith	Simon Nicholson	7 October 2006	1017	306b
247	13	"Big Strong Henry"	Steve Asquith	Simon Nicholson	8 October 2006	1013	307a
248	14	"Sticky Toffee Thomas"	Steve Asquith	Paul Larson	8 October 2006	1012	307b
248	14	"Sticky Taffy Thomas"	Steve Asquith	Paul Larson	8 October 2006	1012	307b
249	15	"Which Way Now?"	Steve Asquith	James Mason	9 October 2006	1016	308a
250	16	"Thomas and the Shooting Star"	Steve Asquith	Abi Grant	9 October 2006	1015	308b
251	17	"Edward Strikes Out"	Steve Asquith	Sharon Miller	10 October 2006	1018	309a
252	18	"Topped Off Thomas"	Steve Asquith	Sharon Miller	10 October 2006	1010	309b
253	19	"Wharf and Peace"	Steve Asquith	Abi Grant	11 October 2006	1020	310a
254	20	"Thomas' Frosty Friend"	Steve Asquith	Sharon Miller	11 October 2006	1019	310b
255	21	"Emily and the Special Coaches"	Steve Asquith	James Mason	12 October 2006	1009	311a
255	21	"Emily and the Special Cars"	Steve Asquith	James Mason	12 October 2006	1009	311a
256	22	"Thomas and the Colours"	Steve Asquith	Marc Seal	12 October 2006	1021	311b
256	22	"Thomas and the Colors"	Steve Asquith	Marc Seal	12 October 2006	1021	311b
257	23	"Thomas and the Birthday Mail"	Steve Asquith	James Mason	13 October 2006	1023	312a
258	24	"Duncan's Bluff"	Steve Asquith	Paul Larson	13 October 2006	1024	312b
259	25	"Missing Trucks"	Steve Asquith	Wayne Jackman	14 October 2006	1022	313a
259	25	"Missing Cars" (Note: Also titled "Missing Freight Cars" in the U.S. for Mud Glorious Mud.)	Steve Asquith	Wayne Jackman	14 October 2006	1022	313a
260	26	"Thomas and the Treasure"	Steve Asquith	Marc Seal	14 October 2006	1025	313b
261	27	"James the Second Best"	Steve Asquith	Paul Larson	15 October 2006	1027	314a
262	28	"Thomas and Skarloey's Big Day Out"	Steve Asquith	Paul Larson	15 October 2006	1028	314b

=== Series 11 (2007–2008) ===
No. overall	No. in series	UK title (top) US title (bottom)	Directed by	Written by	Original release date	Official No.	TV Order
263	1	"Thomas and the Storyteller"	Steve Asquith	Abi Grant	3 September 2007	1109	401a
264	2	"Emily's Rubbish"	Steve Asquith	Wayne Jackman	3 September 2007	1104	401b
264	2	"Emily and the Garbage"	Steve Asquith	Wayne Jackman	3 September 2007	1104	401b
265	3	"Dream On"	Steve Asquith	Neil Richards	4 September 2007	1105	402a
266	4	"Dirty Work"	Steve Asquith	Wayne Jackman	4 September 2007	1122	402b
267	5	"Hector the Horrid!"	Steve Asquith	Simon Spencer	5 September 2007	1108	403a
268	6	"Gordon and the Engineer"	Steve Asquith	Paul Larson	5 September 2007	1102	403b
268	6	"Gordon and the Mechanic"	Steve Asquith	Paul Larson	5 September 2007	1102	403b
269	7	"Thomas and the Spaceship"	Steve Asquith	Sharon Miller	6 September 2007	1107	404a
270	8	"Henry's Lucky Day"	Steve Asquith	Paul Larson	6 September 2007	1114	404b
271	9	"Thomas and the Lighthouse"	Steve Asquith	Abi Grant	7 September 2007	1111	405a
272	10	"Thomas and the Big Bang"	Steve Asquith	Abi Grant	7 September 2007	1119	405b
273	11	"Smoke and Mirrors"	Steve Asquith	Neil Richards	8 September 2007	1113	406a
274	12	"Thomas Sets Sail"	Steve Asquith	Sharon Miller	8 September 2007	1103	406b
275	13	"Don't Be Silly, Billy"	Steve Asquith	Sharon Miller	9 September 2007	1115	407a
276	14	"Edward and the Mail"	Steve Asquith	Paul Larson	9 September 2007	1118	407b
277	15	"Hide and Peep"	Steve Asquith	Simon Spencer	10 September 2007	1101	408a
278	16	"Toby's Triumph"	Steve Asquith	Abi Grant	10 September 2007	1116	408b
279	17	"Thomas and the Runaway Car"	Steve Asquith	Sharon Miller	11 September 2007	1117	409a
280	18	"Thomas in Trouble"	Steve Asquith	Wayne Jackman	11 September 2007	1121	409b
281	19	"Thomas and the Stinky Cheese"	Steve Asquith	Paul Larson	12 September 2007	1126	410a
282	20	"Percy and the Left Luggage"	Steve Asquith	Abi Grant	12 September 2007	1124	410b
282	20	"Percy and the Baggage"	Steve Asquith	Abi Grant	12 September 2007	1124	410b
283	21	"Skarloey Storms Through"	Steve Asquith	Neil Richards	9 January 2008 (Note: This episode was first released on the Engines & Escapades DVD on 22 October 2007.)	1110	502a
284	22	"Cool Truckings"	Steve Asquith	Paul Larson	10 January 2008	1105	501b
285	23	"Wash Behind Your Buffers"	Steve Asquith	Paul Larson	11 January 2008	1120	503b
286	24	"Duncan Does It All"	Steve Asquith	Wayne Jackman	13 January 2008	1123	502b
287	25	"Sir Handel in Charge"	Steve Asquith	Simon Spencer	14 January 2008	1112	503a
288	26	"Ding-a-Ling"	Steve Asquith	Sharon Miller	15 January 2008	1125	501a

=== Series 12 (2008) ===
No. overall	No. in series	UK title (top) US title (bottom)	Directed by	Written by	Original release date	TV Order
289	1	"Thomas and the Billboard"	Steve Asquith	Mark Robertson	1 September 2008	505a
290	2	"Steady Eddie"	Steve Asquith	Sharon Miller	2 September 2008	505b
291	3	"Rosie's Funfair Special" "Rosie's Carnival Special"	Steve Asquith	Andrew Viner	3 September 2008	511a
292	4	"Mountain Marvel"	Steve Asquith	Sharon Miller	4 September 2008	512b
293	5	"Henry Gets It Wrong"	Steve Asquith	Abi Grant	5 September 2008	504b
294	6	"Heave Ho, Thomas!"	Steve Asquith	Sharon Miller	8 September 2008	506a
295	7	"Toby's Special Surprise"	Steve Asquith	Sharon Miller	9 September 2008	506a
296	8	"Excellent Emily"	Steve Asquith	Paul Larson	10 September 2008	509b
297	9	"The Party Surprise"	Steve Asquith	Simon Spencer	11 September 2008	513b
298	10	"Saved You!"	Steve Asquith	Paul Larson	12 September 2008	513a
299	11	"Duncan and the Hot Air Balloon"	Steve Asquith	Mark Robertson	15 September 2008	512a
300	12	"James Works it Out"	Steve Asquith	Simon Spencer	16 September 2008	510b
301	13	"Tram Trouble"	Steve Asquith	Sharon Miller	17 September 2008	510a
302	14	"Don't Go Back!"	Steve Asquith	Simon Spencer	18 September 2008	507a
303	15	"Gordon Takes a Shortcut"	Steve Asquith	Wayne Jackman	19 September 2008	508b
304	16	"The Man in the Hills"	Steve Asquith	Sharon Miller	22 September 2008	509a
305	17	"Thomas Puts the Brakes On"	Steve Asquith	Mark Robertson	23 September 2008	508a
306	18	"Percy and the Bandstand"	Steve Asquith	Paul Larson	24 September 2008	507b
307	19	"Push Me, Pull You!"	Steve Asquith	Sharon Miller	25 September 2008	511b
308	20	"Best Friends"	Steve Asquith	Anna Starkey	26 September 2008	504a

=== Series 13 (2010) ===
No. overall	No. in series	Title	Directed by	Written by	Original release date	TV Order
309	1	"Creaky Cranky"	Greg Tiernan	Sharon Miller	25 January 2010	601a
310	2	"The Lion of Sodor"	Greg Tiernan	Mark Robertson	26 January 2010	601b
311	3	"Tickled Pink"	Greg Tiernan	Allan Plenderleith	27 January 2010	602a
312	4	"Double Trouble"	Greg Tiernan	Sharon Miller	28 January 2010	602b
313	5	"Slippy Sodor"	Greg Tiernan	Mark Robertson	29 January 2010	603a
314	6	"The Early Bird"	Greg Tiernan	David Richard Fox	1 February 2010	603b
315	7	"Play Time"	Greg Tiernan	Sharon Miller	2 February 2010	604a
316	8	"Thomas and the Pigs"	Greg Tiernan	Allan Plenderleith	3 February 2010	604b
317	9	"Time for a Story"	Greg Tiernan	Miranda Larson	4 February 2010	605a
318	10	"Percy's Parcel"	Greg Tiernan	Robyn Charteris	5 February 2010	605b
319	11	"Toby's New Whistle"	Greg Tiernan	Louise Kramskoy	8 February 2010	606a
320	12	"A Blooming Mess"	Greg Tiernan	Miranda Larson	9 February 2010	606b
321	13	"Thomas and the Runaway Kite"	Greg Tiernan	Louise Kramskoy	10 February 2010	607a
322	14	"Steamy Sodor"	Greg Tiernan	Sharon Miller	11 February 2010	607b
323	15	"Splish Splash Splosh"	Greg Tiernan	Sharon Miller	12 February 2010	608a
324	16	"The Biggest Present of All"	Greg Tiernan	Sharon Miller	15 February 2010	608b
325	17	"Snow Tracks"	Greg Tiernan	Alan Hescott	16 February 2010	609a
326	18	"Henry's Good Deeds"	Greg Tiernan	Alan Hescott	17 February 2010	609b
327	19	"Buzzy Bees"	Greg Tiernan	Sharon Miller	18 February 2010	610a
328	20	"Hiro Helps Out"	Greg Tiernan	Sharon Miller	19 February 2010	610b

=== Series 14 (2010) ===
No. overall	No. in series	Title	Directed by	Written by	Original release date	TV Order
329	1	"Thomas' Tall Friend"	Greg Tiernan	Sharon Miller	11 October 2010	701a
330	2	"James in the Dark"	Greg Tiernan	Mark Robertson	12 October 2010	701b
331	3	"Pingy Pongy Pick Up"	Greg Tiernan	Miranda Larson	13 October 2010	702a
332	4	"Charlie and Eddie"	Greg Tiernan	Sharon Miller	14 October 2010	702b
333	5	"Toby and the Whistling Woods"	Greg Tiernan	Louise Kramskoy	15 October 2010	703a
334	6	"Henry's Health and Safety"	Greg Tiernan	Sharon Miller	18 October 2010	703b
335	7	"Diesel's Special Delivery"	Greg Tiernan	Jessica Sandys Clarke	19 October 2010	704a
336	8	"Pop Goes Thomas"	Greg Tiernan	Mark Robertson	20 October 2010	704b
337	9	"Victor Says Yes"	Greg Tiernan	Denise Cassar	21 October 2010	705a
338	10	"Thomas in Charge"	Greg Tiernan	Mark Daydy	22 October 2010	705b
339	11	"Being Percy"	Greg Tiernan	Rachel Dawson	25 October 2010	706a
340	12	"Merry Winter Wish"	Greg Tiernan	Miranda Larson	26 October 2010	706b
341	13	"Thomas and the Snowman Party"	Greg Tiernan	Jessica Sandys Clarke	27 October 2010	707a
342	14	"Thomas' Crazy Day"	Greg Tiernan	Sharon Miller	28 October 2010	707b
343	15	"Jumping Jobi Wood!"	Greg Tiernan	Sharon Miller	29 October 2010	708a
344	16	"Thomas and Scruff"	Greg Tiernan	Sharon Miller	1 November 2010	708b
345	17	"O the Indignity"	Greg Tiernan	Sharon Miller	2 November 2010	709a
346	18	"Jitters and Japes"	Greg Tiernan	Sharon Miller	3 November 2010	709b
347	19	"Merry Misty Island"	Greg Tiernan	Sharon Miller	4 November 2010	710a
348	20	"Henry's Magic Box"	Greg Tiernan	Sharon Miller	8 November 2010	710b

=== Series 15 (2011) ===
No. overall	No. in series	Title	Directed by	Written by	Original release date	TV Order
349	1	"Gordon and Ferdinand"	Greg Tiernan	Sharon Miller	1 March 2011	801a
350	2	"Toby and Bash"	Greg Tiernan	Sharon Miller	2 March 2011	801b
351	3	"Emily and Dash"	Greg Tiernan	Sharon Miller	3 March 2011	802b
352	4	"Percy's New Friends"	Greg Tiernan	Gerard Foster	4 March 2011	802a
353	5	"Edward the Hero"	Greg Tiernan	Sharon Miller	7 March 2011	803b
354	6	"James to the Rescue"	Greg Tiernan	Sharon Miller	8 March 2011	803a
355	7	"Happy Hiro"	Greg Tiernan	Sharon Miller	9 March 2011	804b
356	8	"Up, Up and Away!"	Greg Tiernan	Sharon Miller	10 March 2011	804b
357	9	"Henry's Happy Coal"	Greg Tiernan	Sharon Miller	11 March 2011	805a
358	10	"Let It Snow"	Greg Tiernan	Sharon Miller	14 March 2011	805a
359	11	"Surprise, Surprise"	Greg Tiernan	Sharon Miller	15 March 2011	806a
360	12	"Spencer the Grand"	Greg Tiernan	Jessica Sandys Clarke	16 March 2011	806b
361	13	"Stop That Bus!"	Greg Tiernan	Sharon Miller	17 March 2011	807a
362	14	"Stuck on You"	Greg Tiernan	Sharon Miller	18 March 2011	807b
363	15	"Big Belle"	Greg Tiernan	Sharon Miller	21 March 2011	808a
364	16	"Kevin the Steamie"	Greg Tiernan	Laurie Israel & Rachel Ruderman	22 March 2011	808b
365	17	"Wonky Whistle"	Greg Tiernan	Neil Ben	23 March 2011	809a
366	18	"Percy the Snowman"	Greg Tiernan	Lizzie Ennever	24 March 2011	809b
367	19	"Tree Trouble"	Greg Tiernan	Sharon Miller	25 March 2011	810b
368	20	"Fiery Flynn"	Greg Tiernan	Sharon Miller	28 March 2011	810b

=== Series 16 (2012) ===
No. overall	No. in series	UK title (top) US title (bottom)	Directed by	Written by	Original release date	TV Order
369	1	"Race to the Rescue"	Greg Tiernan	Sharon Miller	20 February 2012	901a
370	2	"Ol' Wheezy Wobbles"	Greg Tiernan	Sharon Miller	21 February 2012	901b
371	3	"Express Coming Through"	Greg Tiernan	Sharon Miller	22 February 2012	902a
372	4	"Percy and the Monster of Brendam"	Greg Tiernan	Sharon Miller	23 February 2012	902b
373	5	"Ho Ho Snowman"	Greg Tiernan	Sharon Miller	24 February 2012	903a
374	6	"Flash Bang Wallop!"	Greg Tiernan	Jessica Sandys Clarke	27 February 2012	903b
375	7	"Thomas and the Rubbish Train"	Greg Tiernan	Andrew Viner	28 February 2012	904a
375	7	"Thomas and the Garbage Train"	Greg Tiernan	Andrew Viner	28 February 2012	904a
376	8	"Thomas Toots the Crows"	Greg Tiernan	Dan & Nuria Wicksman	29 February 2012	904b
377	9	"Bust My Buffers!"	Greg Tiernan	Sharon Miller	1 March 2012	905a
378	10	"Percy and the Calliope"	Greg Tiernan	Max Allen	2 March 2012	905b
379	11	"Thomas and the Sounds of Sodor"	Greg Tiernan	Gerard Foster	5 March 2012	906a
380	12	"Salty's Surprise"	Greg Tiernan	Sharon Miller	6 March 2012	906b
381	13	"Sodor Surprise Day"	Greg Tiernan	Kirsty Peart & Jess Kedward	7 March 2012	907a
382	14	"Emily's Winter Party Special"	Greg Tiernan	Max Allen	8 March 2012	907b
383	15	"Muddy Matters"	Greg Tiernan	Max Allen	9 March 2012	908a
384	16	"Whiff's Wish"	Greg Tiernan	Andy Bernhardt	12 March 2012	908b
385	17	"Welcome Stafford"	Greg Tiernan	Sharon Miller	13 March 2012	909a
386	18	"Don't Bother Victor!"	Greg Tiernan	Sharon Miller	14 March 2012	909b
387	19	"Happy Birthday Sir!"	Greg Tiernan	Sharon Miller	15 March 2012	910a
388	20	"The Christmas Tree Express"	Greg Tiernan	Sharon Miller	25 December 2012	910b

=== Series 17 (2013–2014) ===
No. overall	No. in series	Title	Directed by	Written by	Original release date	TV Order
389	1	"Kevin's Cranky Friend"	David Baas	Lee Pressman	3 June 2013	1001a
390	2	"Scruff's Makeover"	David Baas	Lee Pressman	4 June 2013	1001b
391	3	"Wayward Winston"	David Baas	Lee Pressman	5 June 2013	1002a
392	4	"Gordon Runs Dry"	David Baas	Andrew Brenner	6 June 2013	1002b
393	5	"Calm Down Caitlin"	David Baas	Davey Moore	7 June 2013	1003a
394	6	"Steamie Stafford"	David Baas	Laura Beaumont & Paul Larson	10 June 2013	1003b
395	7	"Henry's Hero"	David Baas	Laura Beaumont & Paul Larson	11 June 2013	1004a
396	8	"Luke's New Friend"	David Baas	Davey Moore	12 June 2013	1004b
397	9	"The Switch"	David Baas	Davey Moore	13 June 2013	1005a
398	10	"Not Now, Charlie!"	David Baas	Davey Moore	14 June 2013	1005b
399	11	"The Lost Puff"	David Baas	Davey Moore	30 September 2013	1006a
400	12	"The Thomas Way"	David Baas	Laura Beaumont & Paul Larson	1 October 2013	1006b
401	13	"The Phantom Express"	David Baas	Laura Beaumont & Paul Larson	2 October 2013	1007a
402	14	"Percy's Lucky Day"	David Baas	Davey Moore	3 October 2013	1007b
403	15	"Bill or Ben?"	David Baas	Andrew Brenner	4 October 2013	1008a
404	16	"Too Many Fire Engines"	David Baas	Andrew Brenner	5 November 2013	1008b
405	17	"No Snow for Thomas"	David Baas	Laura Beaumont & Paul Larson	23 December 2013	1009a
406	18	"Santa's Little Engine"	David Baas	Andrew Brenner	24 December 2013	1009b
407	19	"The Missing Christmas Decorations"	David Baas	Andrew Brenner	25 December 2013	1010a
408	20	"The Frozen Turntable"	David Baas	Andrew Brenner	26 December 2013	1010b
409	21	"Away from the Sea"	David Baas	Andrew Brenner	5 July 2014 (Note: This episode was first released on the Spills & Thrills DVD on 31 March 2014.)	1011a
410	22	"Gone Fishing"	David Baas	Andrew Brenner	5 July 2014	1011b
411	23	"The Afternoon Tea Express"	David Baas	Laura Beaumont & Paul Larson	6 July 2014	1012a
412	24	"The Smelly Kipper"	David Baas	Andrew Brenner	6 July 2014	1012b
413	25	"No More Mr. Nice Engine"	David Baas	Laura Beaumont & Paul Larson	21 November 2014	1013a
414	26	"Thomas' Shortcut"	David Baas	Andrew Brenner	21 November 2014	1013b

=== Series 18 (2014–2015) ===
No. overall	No. in series	UK title (top) US title (bottom)	Directed by	Written by	Original release date	TV Order
415	1	"Old Reliable Edward"	David Stoten	Andrew Brenner	25 August 2014	1101a
416	2	"Not So Slow Coaches"	David Stoten	Paul Larson & Laura Beaumont	26 August 2014	1101b
417	3	"Flatbeds of Fear"	David Stoten	Paul Larson & Laura Beaumont	27 August 2014	1102a
418	4	"Disappearing Diesels"	David Stoten	Andrew Brenner	28 August 2014	1102b
419	5	"Signals Crossed"	David Stoten	Mark Huckerby & Nick Ostler	29 August 2014	1103a
420	6	"Toad's Adventure"	David Stoten	Mark Huckerby & Nick Ostler	1 September 2014	1103b
421	7	"Duck in the Water"	David Stoten	Andrew Brenner	2 September 2014	1104a
422	8	"Duck and the Slip Coaches"	David Stoten	Mark Huckerby & Nick Ostler	3 September 2014	1104b
423	9	"Thomas the Quarry Engine"	David Stoten	Andrew Brenner	4 September 2014	1105a
424	10	"Thomas and the Emergency Cable"	David Stoten	Andrew Brenner	5 September 2014	1105b
425	11	"Duncan and the Grumpy Passenger"	Don Spencer	Davey Moore	8 September 2014	1106a
426	12	"Marion and the Pipe"	Don Spencer	Mark Huckerby & Nick Ostler	9 September 2014	1106b
427	13	"Missing Gator"	Don Spencer	Andrew Brenner	10 September 2014	1107a
428	14	"No Steam Without Coal"	Don Spencer	Davey Moore	11 September 2014	1107b
429	15	"Spencer's VIP"	Don Spencer	Andrew Brenner	12 September 2014	1108a
430	16	"Toad's Bright Idea"	Don Spencer	Davey Moore	15 September 2014	1108b
431	17	"Long Lost Friend"	Don Spencer	Mark Huckerby & Nick Ostler	23 December 2014	1109a
432	18	"Last Train for Christmas"	Don Spencer	Andrew Brenner	24 December 2014	1109b
433	19	"Duncan the Humbug"	Don Spencer	Davey Moore	25 December 2014	1110a
434	20	"The Perfect Gift"	Don Spencer	Davey Moore	26 December 2014	1110b
435	21	"Emily Saves the World"	Don Spencer	Paul Larson & Laura Beaumont	27 July 2015 (Note: This episode was first released on the Dinos & Discoveries DVD on 12 January 2015.)	1111a
436	22	"Timothy and the Rainbow Truck"	Don Spencer	Davey Moore	28 July 2015	1111b
436	22	"Timothy and the Rainbow Car"	Don Spencer	Davey Moore	28 July 2015	1111b
437	23	"Marion and the Dinosaurs"	Don Spencer	Andrew Brenner	29 July 2015	1112a
438	24	"Samson at Your Service"	Don Spencer	Davey Moore	30 July 2015	1112b
439	25	"Samson Sent for Scrap"	Don Spencer	Mark Huckerby & Nick Ostler	31 July 2015	1113a
440	26	"Millie and the Volcano"	Don Spencer	Andrew Brenner	31 July 2015	1113b

=== Series 19 (2015–2017) ===
No. overall	No. in series	UK title (top) US title (bottom)	Directed by	Written by	Original release date	Official No.
441	1	"Who's Geoffrey?"	Don Spencer	Lee Pressman	21 September 2015	1901
442	2	"The Truth About Toby"	Don Spencer	Davey Moore	22 September 2015	1904
443	3	"Lost Property"	Don Spencer	Helen Farrall	23 September 2015	1905
444	4	"Henry Spots Trouble"	Don Spencer	Davey Moore	24 September 2015	1906
445	5	"A Cranky Christmas"	Don Spencer	Mark Huckerby & Nick Ostler	4 January 2016	1902
446	6	"Snow Place Like Home"	Don Spencer	Lee Pressman	5 January 2016	1903
447	7	"The Beast of Sodor"	Don Spencer	Becky Overton	6 January 2016	1909
448	8	"Toad and the Whale"	Don Spencer	Helen Farrall	14 March 2016	1907
449	9	"Very Important Sheep"	Don Spencer	Helen Farrall	15 March 2016	1908
450	10	"Salty All at Sea"	Don Spencer	Lee Pressman	16 March 2016	1910
451	11	"Den & Dart"	Dianna Basso & Don Spencer	Davey Moore	17 March 2016	1913
452	12	"Helping Hiro"	Don Spencer	Mark Huckerby & Nick Ostler	18 March 2016	1914
453	13	"Slow Stephen"	Don Spencer	Helen Farrall	11 July 2016 (Note: This episode was first released on the Start Your Engines! DVD on 14 March 2016.)	1915
454	14	"Two Wheels Good"	Don Spencer	Lee Pressman	12 July 2016	1916
455	15	"Reds vs Blues"	Don Spencer	Davey Moore	13 July 2016	1917
456	16	"Best Engine Ever"	Dianna Basso, Don Spencer & David Stoten	Andrew Brenner	14 July 2016	1918
457	17	"The Little Engine Who Raced Ahead"	Dianna Basso, Don Spencer & David Stoten	Andrew Brenner	15 July 2016	1919
458	18	"Philip to the Rescue"	Dianna Basso, Don Spencer & David Stoten	Andrew Brenner	18 July 2016	1920
459–460	19–20	"Diesel's Ghostly Christmas"	Don Spencer & Dianna Basso	Becky Overton	26 December 2016 (Note: This episode was first released on the Thomas's Christmas Carol DVD on 7 November 2016.)	1911/1912
461	21	"Rocky Rescue"	Dianna Basso	Davey Moore	6 March 2017 (Note: This episode was first released on the Full Steam to the Rescue! DVD on 24 October 2016.)	1921
462	22	"Thomas the Babysitter"	Dianna Basso	Helen Farrall	6 March 2017	1922
463	23	"The Other Side of the Mountain"	Dianna Basso	Andrew Brenner	7 March 2017	1923
464	24	"No Help at All"	Dianna Basso	Andrew Brenner	8 March 2017	1924
465	25	"Goodbye Fat Controller"	Dianna Basso	Teleplay by : Andrew Brenner; Story by : Robin Gay	9 March 2017	1925
465	25	"Goodbye Sir Topham Hatt"	Dianna Basso	Teleplay by : Andrew Brenner; Story by : Robin Gay	9 March 2017	1925
466	26	"Wild Water Rescue"	Don Spencer	Becky Overton	10 March 2017	1926

=== Series 20 (2016–2017) ===
No. overall	No. in series	UK title (top) US title (bottom)	Directed by	Written by	Source	Original release date	Official No.
467	1	"Sidney Sings"	Dianna Basso	Lee Pressman	Original by HiT Entertainment and Dianna Basso	5 September 2016	2001
468	2	"Toby's New Friend"	Dianna Basso	Andrew Brenner	Original by HiT Entertainment and Dianna Basso	6 September 2016	2003
469	3	"Henry Gets the Express"	Dianna Basso	Helen Farrall	Original by HiT Entertainment and Dianna Basso	7 September 2016	2004
470	4	"Diesel and the Ducklings"	Dianna Basso	Lee Pressman	Original by HiT Entertainment and Dianna Basso	8 September 2016	2005
471	5	"Bradford the Brake Van"	Dianna Basso	Lee Pressman	Original by HiT Entertainment and Dianna Basso	9 September 2016	2006
472	6	"Saving Time"	Dianna Basso	Andrew Brenner	Original by HiT Entertainment and Dianna Basso	21 November 2016	2007
473	7	"Ryan and Daisy"	Dianna Basso	Davey Moore	Original by HiT Entertainment and Dianna Basso	22 November 2016	2008
474	8	"Pouty James"	Dianna Basso	Andrew Brenner	Original by HiT Entertainment and Dianna Basso	23 November 2016	2011
475	9	"Blown Away"	Dianna Basso	Helen Farrall	Original by HiT Entertainment and Dianna Basso	24 November 2016	2012
476	10	"The Way She Does It"	Dianna Basso	Davey Moore	Original by HiT Entertainment and Dianna Basso	25 November 2016	2013
477	11	"Letters to Santa"	Dianna Basso	Helen Farrall	Original by HiT Entertainment and Dianna Basso	27 December 2016	2002
478	12	"Love Me Tender"	Dianna Basso	Davey Moore	Original by HiT Entertainment and Dianna Basso	28 December 2016	2010
479	13	"The Railcar and the Coaches"	Dianna Basso	Davey Moore	Original by HiT Entertainment and Dianna Basso	29 December 2016	2009
480	14	"Mucking About"	Dianna Basso	Davey Moore	Original by HiT Entertainment and Dianna Basso	5 June 2017	2014
481	15	"Cautious Connor"	Dianna Basso	Andrew Brenner	Original by HiT Entertainment and Dianna Basso	6 June 2017	2015
482	16	"All in Vain"	Dianna Basso	Helen Farrall	Original by HiT Entertainment and Dianna Basso	7 June 2017	2016
483	17	"Buckled Tracks and Bumpy Trucks"	Dianna Basso	Lee Pressman	Original by HiT Entertainment and Dianna Basso	8 June 2017	2017
483	17	"Buckled Tracks and Bumpy Cars"	Dianna Basso	Lee Pressman	Original by HiT Entertainment and Dianna Basso	8 June 2017	2017
484	18	"Tit for Tat"	Dianna Basso	Andrew Brenner	Small Railway Engines by Rev. W. Awdry	9 June 2017	2018
485	19	"Mike's Whistle"	Dianna Basso	Andrew Brenner	Small Railway Engines by Rev. W. Awdry	12 June 2017	2019
486	20	"Useful Railway"	Dianna Basso	Andrew Brenner	Small Railway Engines by Rev. W. Awdry	13 June 2017	2020
487	21	"Henry in the Dark"	Dianna Basso	Lee Pressman	Original by HiT Entertainment and Dianna Basso	24 July 2017 (Note: This episode was first released on the Extraordinary Engines DVD on 3 April 2017.)	2021
488	22	"Three Steam Engines Gruff"	Dianna Basso	Andrew Brenner	Original by HiT Entertainment and Dianna Basso	25 July 2017	2022
489	23	"Engine of the Future"	Dianna Basso	Andrew Brenner	Original by HiT Entertainment and Dianna Basso	26 July 2017	2023
490	24	"Hugo and the Airship"	Dianna Basso	Andrew Brenner	Original by HiT Entertainment and Dianna Basso	27 July 2017	2024
491	25	"The Missing Breakdown Train"	Dianna Basso	Davey Moore	Original by HiT Entertainment and Dianna Basso	28 July 2017	2025
492	26	"Skiff and the Mermaid"	Dianna Basso	Helen Farrall	Original by HiT Entertainment and Dianna Basso	31 July 2017	2026
493	27	"The Christmas Coffeepot"	Dianna Basso	Helen Farrall	Original by HiT Entertainment and Dianna Basso	14 December 2017	2101
494	28	"Over the Hill"	Dianna Basso	Helen Farrall	Original by HiT Entertainment and Dianna Basso	20 December 2017	2102

=== Series 21 (2017) ===
No. overall	No. in series	Title	Directed by	Written by	Original release date	Official No.
495	1	"Springtime for Diesel"	Dianna Basso	Davey Moore	18 September 2017	2103
496	2	"A Most Singular Engine"	Dianna Basso	Davey Moore	19 September 2017	2104
497	3	"Dowager Hatt's Busy Day"	Dianna Basso	Lee Pressman	20 September 2017	2108
498	4	"Stuck in Gear"	Dianna Basso	Davey Moore	21 September 2017	2111
499	5	"Runaway Engine"	Dianna Basso	Helen Farrall	22 September 2017	2112
500	6	"P.A. Problems"	Dianna Basso	Lee Pressman	25 September 2017	2113
501	7	"Hasty Hannah"	Dianna Basso	Lee Pressman	26 September 2017	2114
502	8	"Cranky at the End of the Line"	Dianna Basso	Lee Pressman	27 September 2017	2115
503	9	"New Crane on the Dock"	Dianna Basso	Lee Pressman	28 September 2017	2116
504	10	"Unscheduled Stops"	Dianna Basso	Helen Farrall	29 September 2017	2117
505	11	"Philip's Number"	Dianna Basso	Lee Pressman	2 October 2017	2118
506	12	"The Fastest Red Engine on Sodor"	Dianna Basso	Helen Farrall	3 October 2017	2119
507	13	"A Shed for Edward"	Dianna Basso	Lee Pressman	4 October 2017	2120
508	14	"The Big Freeze"	Dianna Basso	Helen Farrall	1 December 2017 (Note: This episode was first released on the Christmas on Sodor DVD on 13 November 2017.)	2110
509	15	"Emily in the Middle"	Dianna Basso	Davey Moore	6 December 2017	2109
510	16	"Terence Breaks the Ice"	Dianna Basso	Lee Pressman	11 December 2017	2105
511	17	"Daisy's Perfect Christmas"	Dianna Basso	Davey Moore	18 December 2017	2107
512	18	"Confused Coaches"	Dianna Basso	Helen Farrall	22 December 2017	2106

=== Series 22 (2018–2019) ===
No. overall	No. in series	UK Title (top) US Title (bottom)	Directed by	Written by	Original release date	TV Order
513	1	"Number One Engine"	Dianna Basso	Davey Moore	3 September 2018	37a
514	2	"Forever and Ever"	Dianna Basso	Andrew Brenner	4 September 2018	37b
515	3	"Confusion Without Delay"	Dianna Basso	Davey Moore	5 September 2018	38a
516	4	"Trusty Trunky"	Dianna Basso	Becky Overton	6 September 2018	38b
517	5	"What Rebecca Does"	Dianna Basso	Davey Moore	7 September 2018	39a
518	6	"Thomas Goes to Bollywood"	Dianna Basso	Becky Overton	10 September 2018	39b
519	7	"Thomas in the Wild"	Dianna Basso	Davey Moore	11 September 2018	40a
520	8	"Thomas and the Monkey Palace"	Dianna Basso	Becky Overton	12 September 2018	40b
521	9	"An Engine of Many Colours"	Dianna Basso	Michael White	13 September 2018	41a
521	9	"An Engine of Many Colors"	Dianna Basso	Michael White	13 September 2018	41a
522	10	"Outback Thomas"	Dianna Basso	Tim Bain	14 September 2018	41b
523	11	"School of Duck"	Dianna Basso	Lee Pressman	17 September 2018	42a
524	12	"Tiger Trouble"	Dianna Basso	Becky Overton	18 September 2018	42b
525	13	"Seeing is Believing"	Dianna Basso	Andrew Brenner	19 September 2018	43a
526	14	"Apology Impossible"	Dianna Basso	Becky Overton	20 September 2018	43b
527	15	"The Water Wheel"	Dianna Basso	Davey Moore	21 September 2018	44a
528	16	"Samson and the Fireworks"	Dianna Basso	Lee Pressman	5 November 2018	44b
529	17	"Runaway Truck"	Dianna Basso	Davey Moore	3 December 2018 (Note: This episode was first released on the Here Comes the Steam Team! DVD on September 24, 2018.)	45a
529	17	"Runaway Car"	Dianna Basso	Davey Moore	3 December 2018	45a
530	18	"Thomas' Animal Ark"	Dianna Basso	Lee Pressman	10 December 2018	45b
531	19	"Cyclone Thomas"	Dianna Basso	Tim Bain	17 December 2018	46a
532	20	"Kangaroo Christmas"	Dianna Basso	Tim Bain	22 December 2018	46b
533	21	"Thomas and the Dragon"	Dianna Basso	Davey Moore	5 February 2019	47a
534	22	"Rosie is Red"	Dianna Basso	Davey Moore	14 February 2019	47b
535	23	"The Case of the Puzzling Parts"	Dianna Basso	Davey Moore	18 February 2019	48a
536	24	"Banjo and the Bushfire"	Dianna Basso	Tim Bain	19 February 2019	48b
537	25	"Counting on Nia"	Dianna Basso	Lee Pressman	20 February 2019	49a
538	26	"Hunt the Truck"	Dianna Basso	Michael White	15 May 2019	49b
538	26	"Hunt the Car"	Dianna Basso	Michael White	15 May 2019	49b

=== Series 23 (2019–2020) ===
No. overall	No. in series	Title	Directed by	Written by	Original release date	TV Order
539	1	"Free the Roads"	Dianna Basso	Michael White	2 September 2019	50a
540	2	"Crowning Around"	Dianna Basso	Camille Ucan & Rose Johnson	3 September 2019	50b
541	3	"Chucklesome Trucks"	Dianna Basso	Davey Moore	4 September 2019	51a
542	4	"The Other Big Engine"	Dianna Basso	Davey Moore	5 September 2019	51b
543	5	"Heart of Gold"	Dianna Basso	Michael White	6 September 2019	52a
544	6	"Batucada"	Dianna Basso	Davey Moore	9 September 2019	52b
545	7	"Gordon Gets the Giggles"	Dianna Basso	Becky Overton	10 September 2019	53a
546	8	"Thomas Makes a Mistake"	Dianna Basso	Camille Ucan & Rose Johnson	11 September 2019	53b
547	9	"Diesel Do Right"	Dianna Basso	Davey Moore	12 September 2019	54a
548	10	"Grudge Match"	Dianna Basso	Davey Moore	13 September 2019	54b
549	11	"Steam Team to the Rescue"	Joey So	Davey Moore	19 October 2019	55
550	12	"Panicky Percy"	Dianna Basso	Camille Ucan & Rose Johnson	16 December 2019	56a
551	13	"All Tracks Lead to Rome"	Joey So & Dianna Basso	Becky Overton	21 December 2019 (Note: This episode was first released on the Digs and Discoveries DVD on October 7, 2019.)	57
552	14	"Mines of Mystery"	Joey So	Becky Overton	22 December 2019	58
553	15	"Laid Back Shane"	Dianna Basso	Camille Ucan & Rose Johnson	4 May 2020 (Note: This episode was first released on the Steam Team to the Rescue DVD on January 13, 2020.)	56b
554	16	"Rangers on the Rails"	Dianna Basso	Davey Moore	5 May 2020	59a
555	17	"Wish You Were Here"	Dianna Basso	Camille Ucan & Rose Johnson	6 May 2020	59b
556	18	"Out of Site"	Dianna Basso	Michael White	7 May 2020	60a
557	19	"First Day on Sodor!"	Dianna Basso	Becky Overton	11 May 2020	60b
558	20	"Lorenzo's Solo"	Dianna Basso	Becky Overton	12 May 2020	61a
559	21	"Deep Trouble"	Dianna Basso	Michael White	13 May 2020	61b
560	22	"Too Loud, Thomas!"	Dianna Basso	Becky Overton	14 May 2020	62a
561	23	"Diesel Glows Away"	Dianna Basso	Davey Moore	15 May 2020 (Note: This episode was first released on The Royal Engine DVD on May 4, 2020.)	62b

=== Series 24 (2020–2021) ===
No. overall	No. in series	Title	Directed by	Written by	Original release date	TV Order
562	1	"Thomas and the Royal Engine"	Joey So	Michael White	2 May 2020	63
563	2	"Emily's Best Friend"	Dianna Basso	Camille Ucan & Rose Johnson	7 September 2020	64a
564	3	"Thomas' Fuzzy Friend"	Dianna Basso	Becky Overton	8 September 2020	64b
565	4	"The Great Little Railway Show"	Dianna Basso	Michael White	9 September 2020	65a
566	5	"Thomas and the Forest Engines"	Dianna Basso	Davey Moore	10 September 2020	65b
567	6	"Emily to the Rescue"	Dianna Basso	Becky Overton	11 September 2020	66a
568	7	"Shankar's Makeover"	Dianna Basso	Camille Ucan & Rose Johnson	14 September 2020	66b
569	8	"Nia and the Unfriendly Elephant"	Dianna Basso	Davey Moore	15 September 2020	67a
570	9	"Thomas' Not-So-Lucky Day"	Ian Cherry	Becky Overton	16 September 2020	67b
571	10	"James the Super Engine"	Dianna Basso	David Stoten	17 September 2020	68a
572	11	"Ace's Brave Jump"	Ian Cherry	Camille Ucan & Rose Johnson	18 September 2020	68b
573	12	"A New Arrival"	Joey So	Paul Larson & Laura Beaumont	24 October 2020 (Note: This episode was first released on the Marvellous Machinery DVD on September 28, 2020.)	69
574	13	"World of Tomorrow"	Joey So	Laura Beaumont & Paul Larson	25 October 2020	70
575	14	"Nia's Bright Idea"	Ian Cherry	Camille Ucan & Rose Johnson	5 December 2020	74b
576	15	"Cleo's First Snow"	Ian Cherry	Becky Overton	6 December 2020	75a
577	16	"Sonny's Second Chance"	Ian Cherry	Becky Overton	11 January 2021	71a
578	17	"Thomas and the Inventor's Workshop"	Ian Cherry	Camille Ucan & Rose Johnson	12 January 2021	71b
579	18	"The Inventor's Spectacular Bridge"	Ian Cherry	David Stoten	13 January 2021	72a
580	19	"Yong Bao and the Tiger"	Ian Cherry	Ian McCue & David Stoten	14 January 2021	72b
581	20	"Gordon and Rebecca, Coming Through!"	Ian Cherry	Davey Moore	15 January 2021	73a
582	21	"Kenji on the Rails Again"	Ian Cherry	Paul Larson & Laura Beaumont	18 January 2021	73b
583	22	"Cleo the Road Engine"	Ian Cherry	Paul Larson & Laura Beaumont	19 January 2021	74a
584	23	"Thomas' Animal Friends"	Ian Cherry	Davey Moore	20 January 2021	75b
