= Down the Line =

Down the Line may refer to:

- riding down the line of swell/wave in surfing
- Down-The-Line, a shooting sport
- "Down the Line" (José González song), a song by José González
- "Down the Line" a 1982 song by Mi-Sex
- Down the Line (radio series), a British radio comedy series
- Down the Line: Rarities, a 2009 compilation album of American singer–songwriter Buddy Holly
- "Go Go Go (Down the Line)", a 1956 song written by Roy Orbison
- The first name of the group that became Zoot (band)

== See also ==
- Down the Mine (disambiguation)
