= Thomas & Friends =

British children's television series

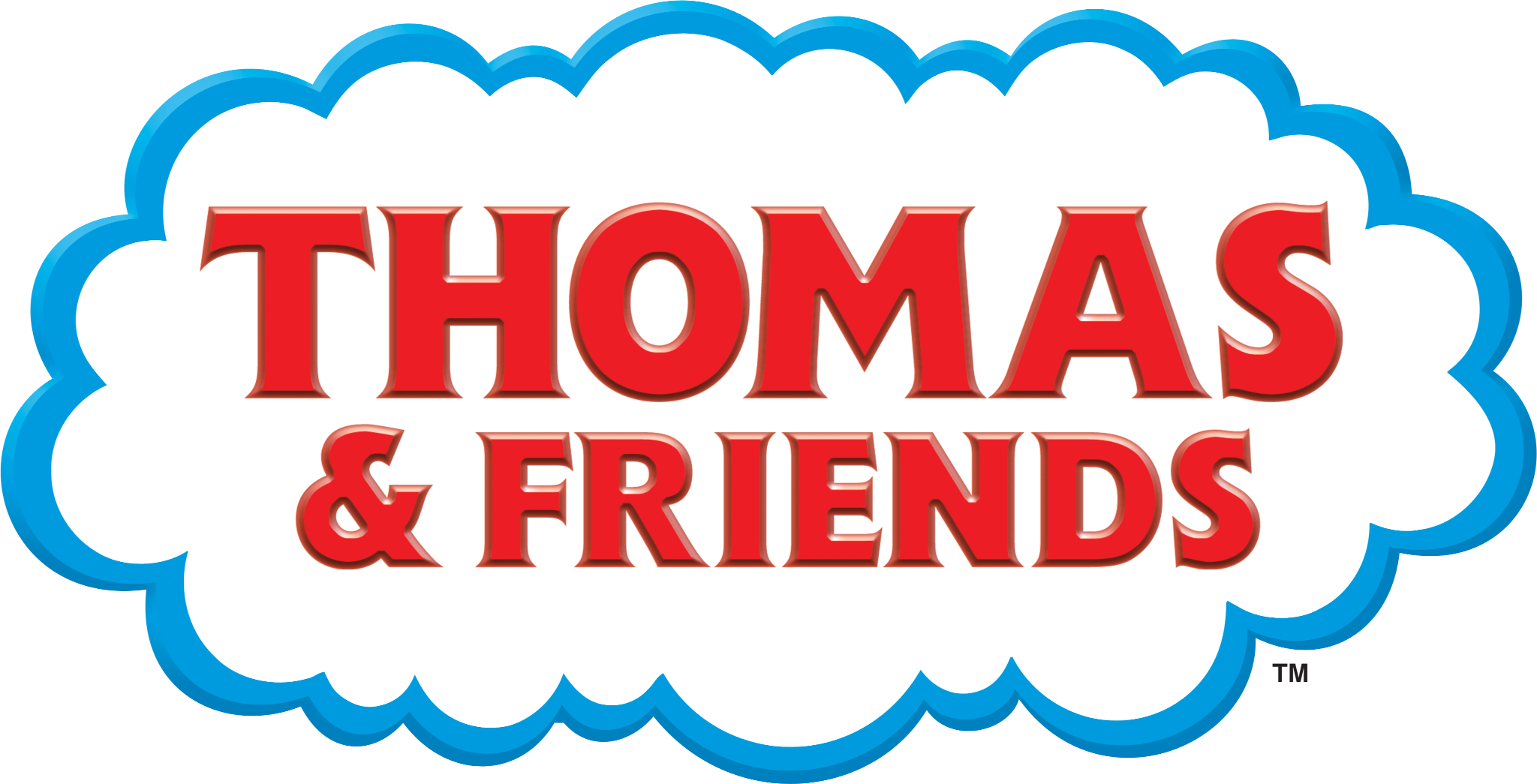
- Also known as: Thomas the Tank Engine & Friends; Thomas & Friends: Big World! Big Adventures!
- Genre: Children's
- Created by: Britt Allcroft
- Based on: The Railway Series by: Wilbert Awdry; Christopher Awdry
- Developed by: Britt Allcroft
- Directed by: List: David Mitton (series 1–7); Steve Asquith (series 8–12); Greg Tiernan (series 13–16); David Baas (series 17); Don Spencer (series 18); Dianna Basso (series 19–24); Joey So (series 23–24); Ian Cherry (series 24)
- Voices of: List of voice actors
- Narrated by: Ringo Starr (Note: In the United States, Starr's series were dubbed by George Carlin.); Michael Angelis (Note: In the United States, Angelis's series were dubbed by George Carlin, Alec Baldwin, and Michael Brandon.); Mark Moraghan; John Hasler (Note: In the United States, Hasler's series were dubbed by Joseph May.)
- Opening theme: The Thomas Theme (1984–2003); Engine Roll Call (2004–2017); Big World! Big Adventures! (2018–2021)
- Composer: List: Mike O'Donnell and Junior Campbell (1984–2003); Robert Hartshorne (2004–2016); Ed Welch (2004–2008); Peter Hartshorne (2011–2016); Chris Renshaw (2016–2021); Oliver Davis (2016–2017)
- Country of origin: United Kingdom
- Original language: English
- No. of series: 24
- No. of episodes: 584 (list of episodes)

Production
- Executive producers: List: Britt Allcroft (1984–1986, 2002); Angus Wright (1991–1998); Peter Urie (2002–2003); Jocelyn Stevenson (2003–2006); Christopher Skala (2007–2011); Marion Edwards (2009–2015); Lenora Hume (2009–2010); Karen Barnes (2011–2013); Kallan Kagan (2013–2017); Jeff Young (2013–2015); Steven Hecht (2013–2015); Michael Carrington (2013–2014); Christopher Keenan (2014–2021); Edward Catchpole (2015); Marianne Culbert (2016); Kyle MacDougall (2016–2021); Jamie LeClaire (2016–2021); Phil LaFrance (2016–2021)
- Producers: List: David Mitton (1984–1998); Robert D. Cardona (1984–1986); Britt Allcroft (1991–1998); Phil Fehrle (2002–2003); Simon Spencer (2004–2008); Nicole Stinn (2008–2012); Ian McCue (2011–2017); Halim Jabbour (2013); Robert Anderson (2013; 2015–2017); Brian Lynch (2013–2015); Jennifer Hill (2014–2015); Lynda Craigmyle (2016); Jane Sobol (2016); Tracy Blagdon (2016–2021); Micaela Winter (2016–2018)
- Production locations: Clapham Junction (1984); Clearwater Studios Battersea (1984); Shepperton Studios (1986–2008)
- Running time: 4–11 minutes: 4 minutes, 30 seconds (series 1–7); 10 minutes (series 8–12); 11 minutes (series 13–24)
- Production companies: Clearwater Features (1984–1986); The Britt Allcroft Company / Gullane Entertainment (Note: Produced as Britt Allcroft Limited and later, Britt Allcroft (Thomas) Limited (Gullane (Thomas) Limited)) (1984–2003); HIT Entertainment (2003–2017); Mattel Television (2017–2021)

Original release
- Network: ITV
- Release: 9 October 1984 – 14 July 1992
- Network: Cartoon Network (Note: Most episodes of Series 4 and 5 first premiered straight-to-video.)
- Release: 16 October 1995 – 19 October 1998
- Network: Nick Jr. (Note: Series 6–8 were rerun on CITV, while series 8–11 were rerun on Channel 5.)
- Release: 16 September 2002 – 12 September 2007
- Network: Channel 5
- Release: 1 September 2008 – 20 January 2021

Related
- Tugs; Shining Time Station; Thomas & Friends: All Engines Go; Thomas & Friends: Railway Stories

Thomas & Friends (Note: Originally known as Thomas the Tank Engine & Friends, and later as Thomas & Friends: Big World! Big Adventures! from series 22 to series 24) is a British children's television series developed by Britt Allcroft. Based on The Railway Series children's books by Wilbert and Christopher Awdry, it centers on Thomas the Tank Engine, as well as various anthropomorphic steam locomotives and other vehicles living on the fictional Island of Sodor.

Allcroft discovered The Railway Series in 1978 and quickly became interested in adapting it to television. It was originally filmed in live action on model sets from 1984 to 2008, before later using computer animation. Over 500 episodes were produced over the course of 24 series. It featured narration from multiple celebrities and actors, beginning with Ringo Starr.

Thomas & Friends premiered on ITV on 9 October 1984 and was broadcast on several other television networks until 20 January 2021. It received mixed critical reception and spawned a franchise of the same name. A film adaptation written and directed by Allcroft, Thomas and the Magic Railroad, was released in theatres in 2000, but underperformed at the box office. A second theatrical film is in development and will be directed by Marc Forster. Thomas & Friends was followed by two reboots: the first was Thomas & Friends: All Engines Go, which premiered in 2021 and ended in 2025; and the second, Thomas & Friends: Railway Stories, which premiered in 2026.

== Premise ==
On the Island of Sodor, numerous steam locomotives—referred to as "engines"—live and work under the ownership of Sir Topham Hatt. Its main characters are members of a group known as the "Steam Team": Thomas, a cheeky tank engine; Edward, a wise tender engine; Henry, a big and strong engine with a soft side; Gordon, a proud and pompous engine who hauls the island's express train; James, a vain, boastful engine who dislikes getting dirty; Percy, a young and naive saddle tank engine; Toby, an old wooden tram engine; Emily, an often-bossy tender engine; Nia, an intelligent tank engine from Kenya; and Rebecca, who sometimes performs Gordon's work. (Note: Emily was introduced in series 7, while Nia and Rebecca replaced Edward and Henry from series 22 to series 24.) Recurring characters include humans, diesel engines, buses, cranes, helicopters, and tractors. The show revolves around the lives of the engines working different jobs across the island's railway as they make friendships, engage in and resolve quarrels and rivalries, solve problems, and help one another.

== Production and history ==
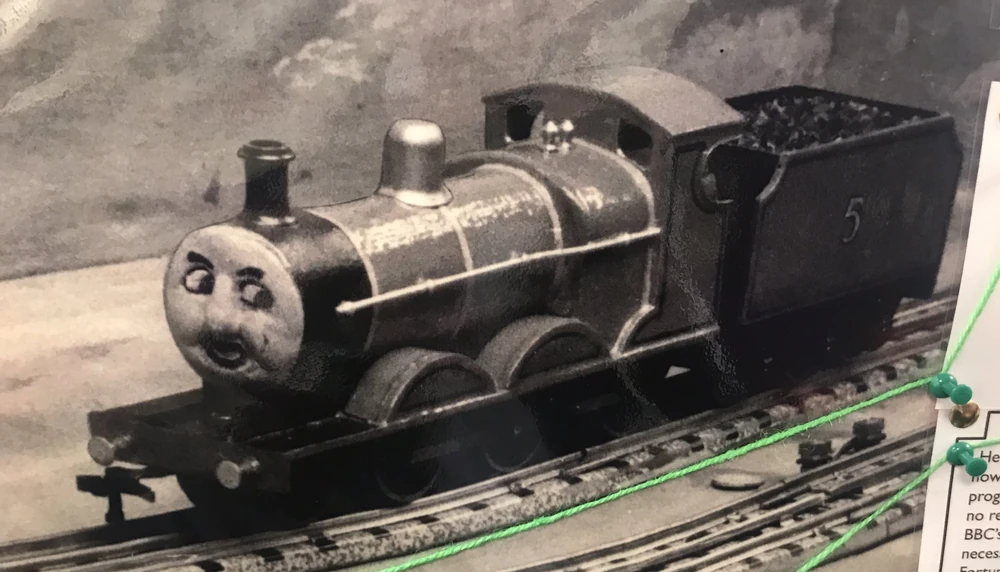
A surviving photograph of James the Red Engine from the 1953 BBC production

Thomas & Friends is adapted from The Railway Series, a series of children's books created by Wilbert Awdry. The BBC attempted to adapt the books to television in 1953, using model trains by Hornby Railways. The broadcast went live that June, and multiple issues such as derailments occurred. Subsequently, the BBC received complaints from viewers, and the Daily Mail featured the failed broadcast on their front page. Andrew Lloyd Webber wrote a Railway Series television adaptation in 1977, which was cancelled following concerns that it would be altered upon being released worldwide. Webber's cancelled adaptation would later serve as inspiration for Starlight Express, a 1984 broadway musical about trains.

In 1978, film producer Britt Allcroft discovered The Railway Series during her research for a documentary film about the Bluebell Railway. She "loved this whole little world [Awdry] had created," quickly became "intrigued by the characters, the relationships between them and the nostalgia they invoked," and wanted to adapt the books to television. Allcroft spent four years securing the funds, which included mortgaging her house to gain a £50,000 bank loan. She hired Ringo Starr upon finding his voice "perfect" for narration; his previous work as a member of the Beatles did not factor into Allcroft's decision. David Mitton was hired to direct, with music being composed by Mike O'Donnell and Junior Campbell. A pilot episode titled "Down the Mine" was produced in 1983.

In September 2000, following the commercial failure of the film Thomas and the Magic Railroad, Allcroft stepped down as chief executive of her company, which was renamed Gullane Entertainment; she remained a creative consultant for the series. In July 2002, HIT Entertainment agreed to acquire Gullane Entertainment, which owned the series, for £139 million in what was described as a hostile takeover. The purchase gave HIT full ownership of Thomas & Friends, alongside properties such as Fireman Sam and Sooty. In 2011, HIT was bought out by Mattel for US$680 million with the sole intent of acquiring Thomas & Friends.

HIT was acquired by Apax Partners in 2005 for £489.4 million, and in 2011 was put up for sale, with the Thomas franchise potentially being sold separately from HIT's other properties. Mattel bought HIT for US$680 million with the sole intent of acquiring Thomas & Friends, and the sale was completed on 1 February 2012, making HIT a wholly owned subsidiary of Mattel.

In 2017, Mattel begun planning a rebrand of the series, titled Thomas & Friends: Big World! Big Adventures!, which saw Thomas travelling to other countries and breaking the fourth wall to speak directly to the audience. Meanwhile, two female characters: Rebecca and Nia, were added to the main cast, with the latter is the series' first African locomotive. A film of the same name released in 2018, with Jam Filled Entertainment producing the new series, which featured a new theme song. Mattel collaborated with the United Nations to design Nia and incorporate their Sustainable Development Goals into both the new episodes and the film.

=== Casting ===
Thomas & Friends initially relied on various narrators, including Ringo Starr, Michael Angelis, George Carlin, Alec Baldwin, Michael Brandon, Pierce Brosnan, Mark Moraghan, John Hasler, and Joseph May. Starr departed from the series in 1990 in favour of returning to his music career; he was replaced by George Carlin in the American dub. The characters were later given their own voices in the 2009 film Thomas & Friends: Hero of the Rails, with Thomas being voiced by Ben Small.

=== Animation ===
Until series 12, Thomas & Friends was filmed in live action at Shepperton Studios and used radio-controlled models and static figures built to 1:32 scale, with stop motion being used for certain characters. Traditional animation was introduced in series 3. In 2009, the series switched to computer animation, allowing the characters' face to move. Animation services were first provided by Nitrogen Studios, who had previously incorporated computer-generated imagery into series 12.

== Episodes ==
Series	Episodes		Originally released		
Series	Episodes		First released	Last released	Network
1	26		9 October 1984	8 January 1985	ITV
2	26		24 September 1986	17 December 1986	ITV
3	26		25 February 1992	14 July 1992	ITV
4	26		4 March 1996	8 April 1996	Cartoon Network
5	26		14 September 1998	19 October 1998	Cartoon Network
6	26		16 September 2002	21 October 2002	Nick Jr.
7	26		3 November 2003	15 November 2003	Nick Jr.
8	26		4 October 2004	16 October 2004	Nick Jr.
9	26		31 October 2005	12 November 2005	Nick Jr.
10	28		2 October 2006	15 October 2006	Nick Jr.
11	26	20	3 September 2007	12 September 2007	Nick Jr.
11	26	6	9 January 2008	15 January 2008	Channel 5
12	20		1 September 2008	26 September 2008	Channel 5
13	20		25 January 2010	19 February 2010	Channel 5
14	20		11 October 2010	8 November 2010	Channel 5
15	20		1 March 2011	28 March 2011	Channel 5
16	20		20 February 2012	25 December 2012	Channel 5
17	26	20	3 June 2013	26 December 2013	Channel 5
17	26	6	5 July 2014	21 November 2014	Nick Jr.
18	26	20	25 August 2014	26 December 2014	Channel 5
18	26	6	27 July 2015	31 July 2015	Channel 5
19	26	20	21 September 2015	26 December 2016	Channel 5
19	26	6	6 March 2017	10 March 2017	Cartoonito
20	28	26	5 September 2016	31 July 2017	Channel 5
20	28	2	14 December 2017	20 December 2017	Channel 5
21	18		18 September 2017	22 December 2017	Channel 5
22	26		3 September 2018	15 May 2019	Channel 5
23	23		2 September 2019	15 May 2020	Channel 5
24	23		2 May 2020	20 January 2021	Channel 5

== Release ==
Thomas & Friends premiered on ITV on 9 October 1984 under the title Thomas the Tank Engine & Friends. The first episode, "Thomas and Gordon", was seen by 8.5 million viewers. Since then, it has been broadcast on Cartoon Network, Channel 5, Milkshake!, Nick Jr., PBS Kids, and Netflix.

In the United States, the series had first appeared in the form of sequences on Shining Time Station, during the program's run from 1989 to 1995 on PBS. The sequences of the series later aired in 1996 on Mr. Conductor's Thomas Tales. The series aired as Storytime with Thomas on Fox Family (now Freeform) from 1999 to 2000. Thomas & Friends returned in the form of several direct-to-video releases during series 6 (2002) and as a stand-alone half-hour program on PBS Kids. It was distributed from 2004 to 2007 by Connecticut Public Television, and then by WNET from 2008 to 2017. It also aired on Sprout from 2005 to 2015. The rights to broadcast the series through PBS expired on 31 December 2017, thus ending a period of almost 30 years of programming related to Thomas & Friends on American public television. From 2018 to 2019, Nickelodeon held exclusive rights to the series in the United States. In 2020, the streaming rights were sold to Netflix, with traditional television rights left unresolved. It also airs on Kabillion. In spring 2024, classic episodes of the series became available on the free streaming channel PBS Retro. Early episodes from series 1 through 7 are available on Amazon Prime Video.

== Reception and analysis ==
Joly Herman from Common Sense Media gave Thomas & Friends a four out of five star rating, writing, "Parents can be assured that this series has educational aspects as well as behavioural modelling." In 2001, it was ranked at 26th place on Channel 4's "The 100 Greatest TV Kids' Shows" poll.

Jia Tolentino of The New Yorker acknowledged that, as a younger child watching Shining Time Station, she did not "take in anything that was actually happening", but after reviewing the show and internet posts about it as an adult, described what she saw as the "show's repressive, authoritarian soul." In 2011, a contributor for Slate analyzed the "hidden subtexts" of British imperialism in the series, while in 2013 Alex Knapp wrote for Forbes about the "baffling economics" of the Island of Sodor.

University of Alberta professor Shauna Wilton wrote "A Very Useful Engine: The Politics of Thomas and Friends". Wilton, who justified her study by arguing that socialisation of children is an important aspect, wrote that she received "a combination of outrage, disbelief, and condescending dismissal" when she announced she was going to study the politicisation of the series, although some people gave her thanks. She stated that despite the inclusion of female characters by the 2000s, in the era after major social revolutions in real life the series was "largely unchanged" from when it was "created in a context of rigid social hierarchies, male dominance in the public sphere, and a strong social culture of good behavior, respecting authority, and following the rules."

== Other media ==
=== Films ===
The first film adaptation of Thomas & Friends, Thomas and the Magic Railroad, was released in July 2000 and grossed almost US$20 million against a cost of US$19 million to produce. It was broadcast on BBC1 on 1 January 2004 and again on 29 December 2008.

A second Thomas & Friends film was first attempted in March 2009, when previous Thomas brand owner HIT Entertainment announced that a live-action Thomas & Friends film would pilot its theatrical division. It was originally targeted for a late 2010 release, but this was later revised to early 2011. HIT contracted Nitrogen Studios to provide character concept art in October 2009. The film would have been directed by Shane Acker, produced by Wētā Workshop and Mattel, financed and distributed by Cinetic Media and UTA Independent Film Group, and written by Will McRobb and Chris Viscardi.

A live-action animated Thomas & Friends film was announced by Mattel Films in October 2020. It will be directed by Marc Forster, with Alyssa Hill and Jesse Wigutow having written the script. It is in active development alongside 13 other film adaptations of Mattel's intellectual properties. In June 2025, Mattel Films merged with the Mattel Television division to become Mattel Studios, with Forster's Thomas & Friends film remaining in development.

=== Reboots ===
On 12 October 2020, Mattel announced the series would be rebooted with Thomas & Friends: All Engines Go, co-produced and animated by Nelvana. The deal stipulated that 104 eleven-minute episodes and two 60-minute specials would be produced, and that the animation would transition from computer animation to 2D animation, with new redesigns for the characters. On 5 February 2021, it was announced that Cartoon Network and Netflix had jointly picked up the broadcast and streaming rights to the series in the United States, respectively. On 11 October 2022, Mattel announced that the series was renewed for a third and fourth season, each consisting of 26 episodes and a special.

A second reboot, titled Thomas & Friends: Railway Stories, was revealed in January 2026. It began with the television special Really Helpful Engines, which was released via YouTube on 17 September 2026 and will be released on Netflix on 30 September. The Railway Stories series will premiere on Milkshake! in February 2027.

== See also ==
- List of The Railway Series and Thomas & Friends characters
- Thomas & Friends: Wonders of Sodor
