= Thomas & Friends series 1 =

Season of television series

Thomas & Friends
- Series 1
- DVD cover art
- No. of episodes: 26

Release
- Original network: ITV
- Original release: 9 October 1984 – 8 January 1985

Series chronology
- Next → Series 2

The first series of the British children's television series Thomas & Friends premiered in the United Kingdom on ITV on 9 October 1984. Based on The Railway Series books by Wilbert Awdry and narrated by Ringo Starr, the series focuses on the daily adventures of various anthropomorphic steam locomotives as well as other vehicles living on the fictional Island of Sodor. The season was produced by Clearwater Features Ltd. for Britt Allcroft (Thomas the Tank Engine) Ltd. and Central Independent Television.

In the United States, the first series premiered in 1989 as part of Shining Time Station, with Starr re-recording portions of each story except "Whistles and Sneezes" with American railway terminology (i.e. "trucks" to "freight cars"). Many stories were also re-titled for home video releases. After Starr left the show, American comedian George Carlin was cast to narrate all episodes from the first series to the fourth series.

== Episodes ==
No.	UK title (top) US title (bottom)	Directed by	Source	Original release date	Official No.	Half-Hour No.
1	"Thomas and Gordon"	David Mitton	Thomas the Tank Engine by Wilbert Awdry	9 October 1984	101	ITV-101a
1	"Thomas Gets Tricked"	David Mitton	Thomas the Tank Engine by Wilbert Awdry	9 October 1984	101	ITV-101a
On the Island of Sodor's North Western Railway, Thomas the Tank Engine works as a station pilot at Knapford Station. He believes himself to be the hardest-working engine on the railway and frequently annoys Gordon the Big Engine, the railway's express passenger engine, by calling him lazy. Frustrated, Gordon plots revenge against Thomas; the next morning, Gordon begins his journey just as Thomas gives him his coaches, preventing him from being uncoupled from the back of the train. Gordon forces Thomas along his route at high speed. Afterwards, Thomas travels home slowly and regrets his past actions.
2	"Edward and Gordon"	David Mitton	The Three Railway Engines by Wilbert Awdry	9 October 1984	102	ITV-101b
2	"Edward Helps Out"	David Mitton	Based on Edward's Day Out and the same story	9 October 1984	102	ITV-101b
Edward is a blue yet small mixed-traffic tender engine on the railway and has not been used recently, prompting the bigger engines to mock him. Feeling sympathetic, Edward's crew allow him to shunt in the train yard and take a passenger train. The next day, Gordon stalls on a steep hill, and Edward is called to push him up. Gordon does not thank Edward, but his crew rewards him with a new paintjob.
3	"The Sad Story of Henry"	David Mitton	The Three Railway Engines by Wilbert Awdry	16 October 1984	103	ITV-102a
3	"Come Out, Henry!"	David Mitton	The Three Railway Engines by Wilbert Awdry	16 October 1984	103	ITV-102a
Henry the Green Engine hauls a passenger train during a rainstorm. Fearing the rain will ruin his paint, he abruptly stops inside a tunnel and refuses to leave. After multiple failed attempts to force him out, the head controller of Sodor, Sir Topham Hatt, leaves Henry inside the tunnel behind a brick wall with no rails. The soot and dust from the tunnel ruins his paint regardless.
4	"Edward, Gordon and Henry"	David Mitton	The Three Railway Engines by Wilbert Awdry	16 October 1984	104	ITV-102b
4	"Henry to the Rescue"	David Mitton	The Three Railway Engines by Wilbert Awdry	16 October 1984	104	ITV-102b
Henry regrets his decisions that led to him being left in the tunnel. Gordon, who planned to mock Henry on his way through the tunnel, bursts his safety valve and breaks down before entering, which Henry laughs at. With Gordon out of commission, Sir Topham Hatt orders Edward to take the train instead, but he is too weak. Henry is selected to pull the train and is freed from the tunnel. He and Edward got the train together and Henry returns to the railway.
5	"Thomas' Train"	David Mitton	Thomas the Tank Engine by Wilbert Awdry	23 October 1984	105	ITV-103a
5	"A Big Day for Thomas"	David Mitton	Thomas the Tank Engine by Wilbert Awdry	23 October 1984	105	ITV-103a
Thomas becomes bored of his usual work and longs to see the world. One morning, Henry falls ill when he is supposed to haul a passenger train. With no other engine available, Sir Topham Hatt reluctantly allows Thomas to pull the train. Excited and impatient, Thomas inexplicably starts his journey before being coupled to the coaches and mistakes the workers' alerts for greetings. He is stopped at a railway signal, where a signalman informs him he has no coaches. Thomas solemnly returns to the station and tries again, but is later mocked by the other engines for his mistake.
6	"Thomas and the Trucks"	David Mitton	Thomas the Tank Engine by Wilbert Awdry	23 October 1984	106	ITV-103b
6	"Trouble for Thomas"	David Mitton	Thomas the Tank Engine by Wilbert Awdry	23 October 1984	106	ITV-103b
Thomas remains bored of working in the yard. Edward offers to swap his goods train for Thomas' work. Thomas gets his chance, but ignores Edward's advice about the trucks. When going downhill, the train pushes Thomas too fast and he overruns the station platform. Sir Topham Hatt, having witnessed the events, confines Thomas to the yard until he is properly educated on trucks.
7	"Thomas and the Breakdown Train"	David Mitton	Thomas the Tank Engine by Wilbert Awdry	30 October 1984	107	ITV-104a
7	"Thomas Saves the Day"	David Mitton	Thomas the Tank Engine by Wilbert Awdry	30 October 1984	107	ITV-104a
Thomas notices a type of train he finds strange; his driver identifies it as a breakdown crane. A new red mixed-traffic engine named James speeds through the yard at dangerous speed; his wooden brake blocks are on fire. Upon hearing that James has derailed, Thomas immediately takes the breakdown crane to the scene of the accident. He spends all day clearing up the mess and rescuing James. Sir Topham Hatt rewards Thomas for his act by granting him a new job as a passenger train on his own branch line.
8	"James and the Coaches"	David Mitton	James the Red Engine by Wilbert Awdry	30 October 1984	108	ITV-104b
8	"James Learns a Lesson"	David Mitton	Based on James and the Top Hat and James and the Bootlace	30 October 1984	108	ITV-104b
James enjoys working on the Island of Sodor, but repeatedly gets into trouble. He accidentally ruins Sir Topham's new top hat and blows a hole in the brake pipe of one of his coaches, which is repaired using a newspaper and leather bootlace. Sir Topham Hatt punishes James for his behaviour by confining him to his shed.
9	"Troublesome Trucks"	David Mitton	James the Red Engine by Wilbert Awdry	6 November 1984	109	ITV-105a
9	"Foolish Freight Cars"	David Mitton	James the Red Engine by Wilbert Awdry	6 November 1984	109	ITV-105a
James is stuck in the sheds after his incident with the coaches, but soon he gets let out to pull some trucks. James is more than happy, even though he does get teased by the other engines about his incident. The trucks try to make James give up, but he manages to pull them to their station.
10	"James and the Express"	David Mitton	James the Red Engine by Wilbert Awdry	6 November 1984	110	ITV-105b
10	"A Proud Day for James"	David Mitton	James the Red Engine by Wilbert Awdry	6 November 1984	110	ITV-105b
Gordon ends up going down a different track with the express, ironically after boasting to James that he knows the right line. James serves as Gordon's replacement for the day and Sir Topham Hatt allows him to take the express occasionally. Gordon gains respect for James and finds joy out of shunting.
11	"Thomas and the Guard"	David Mitton	Tank Engine Thomas Again by Wilbert Awdry	13 November 1984	111	ITV-106a
11	"Thomas and the Conductor"	David Mitton	Tank Engine Thomas Again by Wilbert Awdry	13 November 1984	111	ITV-106a
Thomas successfully runs his branch line with his new passenger coaches Annie and Clarabel, but one day he becomes so impatient with Henry being late that he accidentally leaves his guard behind on a platform.
12	"Thomas Goes Fishing"	David Mitton	Tank Engine Thomas Again by Wilbert Awdry	13 November 1984	112	ITV-106b
Whenever Thomas passes by a river on his branch line, he sees people fishing and longs to partake. One day, the water tower where he refills on water is out of order, forcing him and his crew to fetch water from the river using a leaking bucket. Because of this, Thomas later feels a pain in his boiler. A railway inspector finds that his feed pipe is blocked by a fish that Thomas' crew accidentally fished from the river. They remove the fish from Thomas' water tanks and eat it for lunch along with chips, while Thomas abandons his desire to go fishing.
13	"Thomas, Terence and the Snow"	David Mitton	Tank Engine Thomas Again by Wilbert Awdry	20 November 1984	113	ITV-107a
13	"Terence the Tractor"	David Mitton	Tank Engine Thomas Again by Wilbert Awdry	20 November 1984	113	ITV-107a
Thomas meets a tractor called Terence. Thomas mocks Terence's caterpillar tracks and Terence boasts that he is not confined to a pair of rails like Thomas. During the winter, Thomas refuses to wear a snowplow and gets stuck in a snow pile. He is rescued by Terence, after which he thanks Terence and takes back his insults.
14	"Thomas and Bertie"	David Mitton	Tank Engine Thomas Again by Wilbert Awdry	20 November 1984	114	ITV-107b
14	"Thomas and Bertie's Great Race"	David Mitton	Tank Engine Thomas Again by Wilbert Awdry	20 November 1984	114	ITV-107b
Thomas meets a single-deck bus called Bertie, who reminds him of the snow incident and claims to be faster than him. Bertie challenges Thomas to a race to the next station.
15	"Tenders and Turntables"	David Mitton	Troublesome Engines by Wilbert Awdry	27 November 1984	115	ITV-108a
Henry, Gordon, and James grow frustrated with shunting without Thomas, believing tender engines should not shunt. Gordon and James both have issues with their turntable: Gordon is unable to get perfectly balanced and is forced to pull his next train facing backwards, and James is spun round at high speed by strong winds, leaving him dizzy and completely humiliated when Gordon witnesses it. Fed up, the tender engines go on strike.
16	"Trouble in the Shed"	David Mitton	Troublesome Engines by Wilbert Awdry	27 November 1984	116	ITV-108b
When Sir Topham Hatt learns of the strike, he brings in Edward to do the three's work. When he sees Edward being treated poorly, he buys a new saddle tank engine whom he names Percy to help Edward and Thomas. Percy shunts coaches and works on Thomas' branch line, while Edward and Thomas work together to run the mainline.
17	"Percy Runs Away"	David Mitton	Troublesome Engines by Wilbert Awdry	4 December 1984	117	ITV-109a
Sir Topham Hatt allows Henry, James, and Gordon to end their strike now that they no longer have to shunt their own trains. While taking a break, Percy stops at a junction on the main line and forgets Edward's instructions on altering the signalman. He almost collides with Gordon and reverses backwards, quickly becoming a runaway. Percy travels far and is eventually stopped by a bank of dirt. Gordon pulls him out and congratulates him on preventing an accident.
18	"Coal"	David Mitton	Henry the Green Engine by Wilbert Awdry	4 December 1984	118	ITV-109b
18	"Henry's Special Coal"	David Mitton	Henry the Green Engine by Wilbert Awdry	4 December 1984	118	ITV-109b
Henry has been sick for some time and Sir Topham Hatt is concerned about him. He finds Henry's small firebox is unable to produce enough heat using local coal supply and requires an expensive but special load from Wales. By using their coal, Henry's performance improves drastically.
19	"The Flying Kipper"	David Mitton	Henry the Green Engine by Wilbert Awdry	11 December 1984	119	ITV-110a
Henry hauls an early morning fish train, dubbed "the Flying Kipper". Everything goes well until ice freezes the points from the mainline into a siding and snow forces down a signal into red, leading Henry to collide with a goods brake van in the siding. Sir Topham Hatt sends Henry to Crewe to get a new shape and a larger firebox, allowing him to use regular coal again instead of the Welsh load and making him the engine he always deserved to be.
20	"Whistles and Sneezes"	David Mitton	Henry the Green Engine by Wilbert Awdry	11 December 1984	120	ITV-110b
20	"Whistles and Sneezes"	David Mitton	Based on Gordon's Whistle and Henry's Sneeze	11 December 1984	120	ITV-110b
Gordon is jealous that Henry has been rebuilt and complains that he whistles too much. Ironically, Gordon's whistle jams later on and he is unable to stop whistling. The next day, a trio of boys throw stones at Henry (possibly along with his fireman too) and break the coaches' glass windows. Henry's crew gets revenge by making him sneeze soot at them.
21	"Toby and the Stout Gentleman"	David Mitton	Toby the Tram Engine by Wilbert Awdry	18 December 1984	121	ITV-111a
21	"Toby the Tram Engine"	David Mitton	Toby the Tram Engine by Wilbert Awdry	18 December 1984	121	ITV-111a
Toby is a tram engine who runs a small railway line with his passenger coach Henrietta. Over time, Toby runs out of work, being replaced by automobiles. He continues to work, but his duties and number of passengers become smaller. Toby's line is closed down, but he and his crew later receives a letter.
22	"Thomas in Trouble"	David Mitton	Toby the Tram Engine by Wilbert Awdry	18 December 1984	122	ITV-111b
22	"Thomas Breaks the Rules"	David Mitton	Toby the Tram Engine by Wilbert Awdry	18 December 1984	122	ITV-111b
Thomas gets in trouble with a police constable for not having a cowcatcher or sideplates to cover his wheels, and is legally forbidden from operating part of his branch line. When Sir Topham Hatt hears about it, he buys Toby, who meets both requirements and brings Henrietta with him. Toby befriends Thomas and blows steam at the constable.
23	"Dirty Objects"	David Mitton	Toby the Tram Engine by Wilbert Awdry	25 December 1984	123	ITV-112a
23	"James in a Mess"	David Mitton	Toby the Tram Engine by Wilbert Awdry	25 December 1984	123	ITV-112a
Toby and Henrietta enjoy their new life on the Island of Sodor, but James calls them "dirty objects" as they look old fashioned and need new paint. Later, James takes a goods train, but the trucks push him down Gordon's Hill so fast that he crashes into some tar wagons. James is covered in tar, prompting Toby and Percy to call him a "dirty object" in retaliation.
24	"Off the Rails"	David Mitton	Gordon the Big Engine by Wilbert Awdry	8 January 1985	124	ITV-113a
24	"Gordon Takes a Dip"	David Mitton	Gordon the Big Engine by Wilbert Awdry	8 January 1985	124	ITV-113a
Gordon is mocked by Henry and Percy, retaliating by boasting that he has never had an accident. He is later assigned with hauling a goods train, but refuses. Edward helps Gordon to a turntable, where the latter plans to jam himself on the turntable to avoid work. Gordon accidentally moves too far, slides into a mud ditch, and is stuck. Sir Topham sends Edward to do Gordon's work in his place, but has Gordon kept in the ditch until later. Gordon is freed that night and returns to the shed in humiliation.
25	"Down the Mine"	David Mitton	Gordon the Big Engine by Wilbert Awdry	8 January 1985	125	ITV-113b
Gordon is forced to haul goods trains as punishment for his prior behaviour. Thomas teases Gordon by claiming he smells like ditch water. Later, Thomas is sent to collect trucks from a lead mine, but is restricted by a danger sign. Thomas has previously attempted to pass the sign to little success, but manages to pass it by forcing his driver off him. Thomas falls into a hole in the track and is rendered immobile. Sir Topham Hatt witnesses the accident and sends Gordon to rescue Thomas. Afterwards, Thomas apologises and the two form an alliance.
26	"Thomas' Christmas Party"	David Mitton	Same story by Wilbert Awdry	25 December 1984	126	ITV-112b
Christmas arrives on the Island of Sodor. All the engines are busy with passengers and parcels, especially Thomas and Toby. Thomas likes when he passes Mrs. Kyndley's house while working and she always waves to him. Thomas talks with the other engines about throwing a Christmas party for Mrs. Kyndley to thank her for saving them from an accident a year earlier.
