= Down the Mine =

Television pilot of Thomas & Friends

- Thomas & Friends episode
- Thomas (left) and Gordon (right) conversing at Lower Tidmouth station
- Directed by: David Mitton
- Written by: Wilbert Awdry (original); Britt Allcroft (adaptation); David Mitton (adaptation)
- Story by: Wilbert Awdry
- Based on: The Railway Series by Wilbert Awdry
- Narrated by: Ringo Starr
- Original air dates: 1983 (ITV screening); 9 May 2025 (restoration)
- Running time: 5 minutes

Episode chronology
← Previous —	Next → "Thomas & Gordon"

"Down the Mine" is the television pilot of the British children's television series Thomas & Friends. Created by Britt Allcroft, it was based on a story written by Wilbert Awdry for The Railway Series. In the pilot, Thomas the Tank Engine makes a rude remark to Gordon the Big Engine before falling into a mine tunnel.

The pilot began production in April 1983, being produced by Allcroft and the model animation company Clearwater Features. David Mitton, founder of Clearwater Features, directed and produced the pilot and went on to direct the show. After a screening for the studio executives at ITV, leading to the decision to greenlight the series, the pilot was reshot for the first series, while the original pilot was stored for over 40 years. The film was rediscovered in 2025, and an official restoration was released on YouTube by Mattel the same year, receiving positive reviews from fans. After it was released, many of the props from the series were put up for auction.

== Plot ==
Thomas the Tank Engine waits at Lower Tidmouth station with a passenger train consisting of Annie and Clarabel, his twin passenger coaches. Gordon the Big Engine enters the station, hauling a goods train. Thomas makes a rude remark to Gordon, stating that he smells like "ditch water", before leaving as Annie and Clarabel complain about his rudeness. After having left Annie and Clarabel at another station, Thomas goes to a mine to shunt. Thomas stops short of a sign prohibiting locomotives to pass. Thomas pushes a truck past the sign so he can follow it. The tracks give way underneath Thomas, and he falls into a mine tunnel. Since the ground is not firm enough for cranes, Sir Topham Hatt brings Gordon to pull Thomas out of the mine via a winch. Thomas apologises to Gordon for being rude; Gordon forgives him, and the two form an alliance, agreeing to never disrespect each other again.

== Production ==
Prior to "Down the Mine", there were several unsuccessful attempts to create a television series based on Wilbert Awdry's The Railway Series in the 1950s and 1970s. British producer Britt Allcroft first found out about The Railway Series books in 1979, while working on a documentary pertaining to the Bluebell Railway. After several years of fundraising, the original pilot began production in April 1983 with Allcroft, David Mitton, Robert D. Cardona, and the model animation company Clearwater Features in Battersea, London.

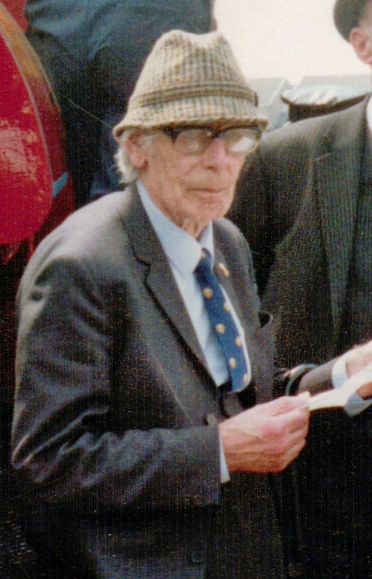
Wilbert Awdry, creator of The Railway Series, pictured in 1988

"Down the Mine" was adapted from pages 34–49 in Gordon the Big Engine, the eighth book of The Railway Series. The locomotives in the original pilot were gauge 1 model trains designed with mechanical humanoid faces. According to the television series's modeler Chris Noulton, the gauge was chosen to effectively film the locomotives in the small filming stage. The two locomotives featured in the pilot—Thomas and Gordon—were built from scratch. Several issues with the locomotives arose during filming: smoke would come out of the locomotives' faces rather than their chimneys, and the radio control used to operate the locomotives would malfunction. Robert Gauld-Galliers, the art director of the series, compared the filming conditions to "working in an oven". Rather than using a temporary studio recording, Ringo Starr provided the narration for the pilot, which is present in the final cut. The pilot was five minutes long, and shot on 35 mm movie film. After a screening with the studio executives at ITV, "Down the Mine" was reshot for the first series, while the original pilot was kept in storage for over 40 years.

In 2025, the team of Ian McCue, the producer of Thomas & Friends from 2010 to 2020, found the pilot's film and began to "piece it together with great love and care". When McCue found the film, it was in poor condition; short sections of film were wrapped with rubber bands and covered in residue. The pilot was restored by Silver Salt Restoration in Hammersmith, London, with additional editing and sound design done by Fonic. Each frame was scanned in 4K resolution and stabilised. McCue did not want to use a pre-existing soundtrack, so he collaborated with Mike O'Donnell, one of the original composers for the series, to score the pilot.

== Release, reception and legacy ==
=== Original pilot ===
In the same year it was produced, the original pilot was screened for the studio executives at ITV. The series was greenlit, and began airing in 1984 under the title Thomas the Tank Engine & Friends. From 1984 to 2021, the series moved to other networks, including Cartoon Network, Nick Jr., Channel 5, and Netflix. It was introduced in the United States through Shining Time Station, which aired from 1989 to 1998. The series expanded to a franchise that also included merchandising.

=== Restored pilot ===
The restored pilot was uploaded to YouTube by Mattel at 18:00 British Summer Time (UTC+1) on 9 May 2025. This was the first time that the pilot was available to the public. The year marked the 80th anniversary of the franchise, which began with the first book of The Railway Series in 1945. The pilot's release was dedicated to the memory of Allcroft, whose death had been announced in January 2025. The restored pilot received positive responses from fans of all ages. Prior to its release, fans on Reddit expressed eagerness and amazement in the discovery of the pilot, which was considered to be lost. After its release, fans' reactions were more sentimental, with one fan stating that they felt "like a kid again". In addition to the release, over 200 items from the series were put up for auction, such as several props and signed pieces from voice actors.
