= Thomas & Friends series 21 =

Season of television series

Thomas & Friends
- Series 21
- No. of episodes: 18

Release
- Original network: Channel 5
- Original release: 18 September – 22 December 2017

Series chronology
- ← Previous; Series 20 Next → Series 22

Thomas & Friends is a children's television series about the engines and other characters on the railways of the Island of Sodor, and is based on The Railway Series books written by Wilbert Awdry.

This article lists and details episodes from the twenty-first series of the show, which started airing on 18 September 2017 in the UK and on 15 December 2017 in the US. The series was narrated by Mark Moraghan, in what was his last series. This was the first series to air on the Nick Jr. Channel in the United States.

This series became the first to have engines and vehicles move their bodies as opposed to being static as they had been in the previous series.

== Episodes ==
No. overall	No. in series	Title	Directed by	Written by	Original release date	Official No.
495	1	"Springtime for Diesel"	Dianna Basso	Davey Moore	18 September 2017	2103
Daisy's springs need fixing after Diesel bumps her. Diesel notices this when Ryan was taking her, Judy and Jerome to the Dieselworks, after he bumps Thomas at the yards and gets annoyed with everyone talking about it. After Daisy is repaired, she tells Diesel that he needs to change his ways.
496	2	"A Most Singular Engine"	Dianna Basso	Davey Moore	19 September 2017	2104
Diesel causes trouble between Daisy and Harvey by spreading rumours, but some crates at the crossing make Daisy and Harvey be friends, by assisting one another on a task.
497	3	"Dowager Hatt's Busy Day"	Dianna Basso	Lee Pressman	20 September 2017	2108
Dowager Hatt runs the railway, while her son Sir Topham is sick and away, however causes lots of trouble, starting from Thomas collecting her new hat to Emily taking Annie and Clarabel on Thomas' Branch Line to Gordon taking trucks of scrap to Percy taking Gordon's Express and other things causing confusion and delay, and is ruined accidentally the grand opening. This gives Emily the time to help her.
498	4	"Stuck in Gear"	Dianna Basso	Davey Moore	21 September 2017	2111
Harvey is a cheery engine, not only unique for his paintwork but for his crane, but when a branch gets stuck in the gears of his crane while clearing some branches out of the way, Harvey feels too shy to ask for help, resulting in trying to fix it himself, only to derail outside a tunnel.
499	5	"Runaway Engine"	Dianna Basso	Helen Farrall	22 September 2017	2112
After a mess with the rubbish, Stephen thinks that Millie ran away after hurting her feelings, so he leaves Glynn at the castle to find Millie with his passengers unexpectedly with him, only to run out of water.
500	6	"P.A. Problems"	Dianna Basso	Lee Pressman	25 September 2017	2113
Sir Topham Hatt's new public address system causes havoc, while Reg uses the old public address system for music down at the Scrapyard.
501	7	"Hasty Hannah"	Dianna Basso	Lee Pressman	26 September 2017	2114
Whilst Henrietta is at the Steamworks being refurbished with new seats, Toby works with another coach, that looks just like Henrietta, who is named Hannah and she is excited to be working with Toby but criticizes him for being slow. She makes Toby speed up too much, so Toby leaves Hannah on a siding and when he returns, Hannah is nowhere to be seen. James passes by with Hannah in tow. At first Hannah is enjoying her fast ride but when she starts to fall apart she becomes horrified as her coupling snaps and as she heads into a nearby siding, now knowing that going too fast can be dangerous. Later on, as Toby arrives with Henrietta, Hannah is happy to see Toby, but when she notices Henrietta, to Toby's surprise, Henrietta reveals that she and Hannah are sisters.
502	8	"Cranky at the End of the Line"	Dianna Basso	Lee Pressman	27 September 2017	2115
After some trouble down at Brendam Docks, Cranky thinks that the Fat Controller will replace him with a newer, shinier crane.
503	9	"New Crane on the Dock"	Dianna Basso	Lee Pressman	28 September 2017	2116
Cranky competes against Carly the new crane when she starts taking all his work, only to get her and himself tied up.: This episode marks the formal introduction of Big Mickey, a hitherto-silent character from the franchise's sister series TUGS, whose model had previously been used as set dressing following the cancellation of "TUGS".
504	10	"Unscheduled Stops"	Dianna Basso	Helen Farrall	29 September 2017	2117
When Bertie breaks down at the Level Crossing during yet another race, Thomas starts making unscheduled stops for Bertie's passengers, which in turn delays his own other passengers. When Sir Topham Hatt becomes suspicious, he decides to follow Thomas and finds out about his unscheduled stops, so he recruits a newly resurrected Bulgy (who returns since having a cameo in Series 12) to fill in for Bertie and take his passengers, which means Thomas can run on time again.
505	11	"Philip's Number"	Dianna Basso	Lee Pressman	2 October 2017	2118
Philip wants to know why he has the number 68 painted on his side after being teased about it by Gordon. For a while, Philip thinks of numbers of where ever he goes, from the Steamworks to the Dieselworks and from the Station platforms to the Troublesome Trucks, until he saves Farmer McColl's sheep from Gordon: 68 of them.
506	12	"The Fastest Red Engine on Sodor"	Dianna Basso	Helen Farrall	3 October 2017	2119
When Thomas says Rosie is repainted red, James becomes jealous and challenges her to a race to Crovan's Gate to see who is the "Fastest Red Engine on Sodor". Following a near miss with Henry, James is advised by Rosie to have his brakes checked. Unbeknownst to James and his crew, however, he is leaking brake fluid, but they haven't heard the noise since James gave Rosie his Troublesome Trucks. This results in a total brake failure, and James crashes into the back of Tidmouth Sheds.
507	13	"A Shed for Edward"	Dianna Basso	Lee Pressman	4 October 2017	2120
While the damaged part of Tidmouth Sheds is being repaired, Edward first sleeps at Wellsworth Sheds with Philip, then at Brendam Docks, then at the Steamworks, then on a ship, then at Ulstead Mine, and then the woods, but they are all too noisy for him to get a good night's sleep all night long or all day long.
508	14	"The Big Freeze"	Dianna Basso	Helen Farrall	1 December 2017 (Note: This episode was first released on the Christmas on Sodor DVD on 13 November 2017.)	2110
When a big freeze hits the island of Sodor, Diesel finally proves himself to be a hero by bringing the coal for the steam engines.
509	15	"Emily in the Middle"	Dianna Basso	Davey Moore	6 December 2017	2109
Emily must help Donald and Douglas with a long, heavy train of pipes to Vicarstown. Donald pulls at the front, while Emily and Douglas push from the back. On the way, Douglas tells Emily about Donald's accidents, making Emily laugh. Her laugh echoes through the pipes, causing Donald to hear and want to switch places with Douglas. As they go up Gordon's hill, Donald tells Emily about Douglas' most recent accident, which makes Emily laugh again. Douglas overhears this and argues with Donald. Emily is unable to hold the train on her own, and as a result, she gets pushed off the rails by a giant snowball.
510	16	"Terence Breaks the Ice"	Dianna Basso	Lee Pressman	11 December 2017	2105
Terence takes a shortcut across a frozen lake while collecting Christmas trees for the holiday market and Thomas tries to save him.
511	17	"Daisy's Perfect Christmas"	Dianna Basso	Davey Moore	18 December 2017	2107
Daisy is sad when Christmas doesn't go as planned: the decorating of Vicarstown, the Children, the Small Railway Engines' fake snow show, the electricity problem back at Vicarstown, the Troublesome Trucks singing Christmas Carols, and Harold with the Star. Ryan, Judy and Jerome soon tell her that change is good every year.
512	18	"Confused Coaches"	Dianna Basso	Helen Farrall	22 December 2017	2106
Spencer and Gordon accidentally upset their passengers when their competitive behavior gets out of hand, and their coaches get mixed up before the New Year's celebration begins.
