= Thomas & Friends series 20 =

Season of television series

Thomas & Friends
- Series 20
- Official cover art for the series 20 DVD
- No. of episodes: 28

Release
- Original network: Channel 5
- Original release: 5 September 2016 – 20 December 2017

Series chronology
- ← Previous; Series 19 Next → Series 21

Thomas & Friends is a children's television series about the engines and other characters on the railways of the Island of Sodor, and is based on The Railway Series books written by Wilbert Awdry.

This article lists and details episodes from the twentieth series of the show, which started airing on 5 September 2016 in the UK, and on 21 October 2016 in the US. The series was narrated by Mark Moraghan for audiences in the UK and US. It was notable for being the first series since the show’s fourth to directly adapt stories from the original Railway Series books. In the US, this was the last series to air on PBS Kids.

== Episodes ==
No. overall	No. in series	UK title (top) US title (bottom)	Directed by	Written by	Source	Original release date	Official No.
467	1	"Sidney Sings"	Dianna Basso	Lee Pressman	Original by HiT Entertainment and Dianna Basso	5 September 2016	2001
Sidney has to go and collect Percy's new wheels, but his memory is not very good. Thomas suggests that Sidney to make up a song to help him remember. By mistake, he thinks his job was to pull passengers to the Docks, but after talking with the Fat Controller, he gets the wheels to Percy in the end, and the two laugh at the Steamworks.
468	2	"Toby's New Friend"	Dianna Basso	Andrew Brenner	Original by HiT Entertainment and Dianna Basso	6 September 2016	2003
Philip thinks that Toby is a boxcab just like himself and wants to become friends, but Toby is not so keen on doing the same thing as Philip and finds him rather persistent and overwhelming, by having a race to the Ffarquhar Quarry.
469	3	"Henry Gets the Express"	Dianna Basso	Helen Farrall	Original by HiT Entertainment and Dianna Basso	7 September 2016	2004
One morning, Gordon's firebox needs to be cleaned out, making him late to pull the express. As a result, Sir Topham Hatt gives Henry the job of pulling the express. Passengers start saying that Henry takes the express even more gently than Gordon does. Meanwhile, Gordon has had enough of pulling Henry's goods trains, and leaves his Troublesome Trucks at the Blue Mountain Quarry. That night, Gordon is told to take the Flying Kipper, but he refuses to do so, prompting Henry and Thomas to trick him into doing it. So Gordon sets out to pull the train. When he gets back in the morning, Sir Topham Hatt tells him he can go back to pulling the express again.
470	4	"Diesel and the Ducklings"	Dianna Basso	Lee Pressman	Original by HiT Entertainment and Dianna Basso	8 September 2016	2005
"Devious" Diesel is known to be mean against the other engines on Sodor, and that is how his diesel friends like it. One day, Thomas spots Diesel being friendly with some ducklings, and threatens to tell everyone if he is mean. Throughout the day, whenever Diesel is about to get devious by calling Emily names, blocking James' and Gordon's lines, and biffing and bashing the Troublesome Trucks very hard in the Shunting Yards, Thomas warns him with a "quack quack quack". As Arry and Bert find him suspicious, Thomas shows the ducklings, but the two diesel twins find the ducklings cute and adorable, making Diesel think he can after all be nice.
471	5	"Bradford the Brake Van"	Dianna Basso	Lee Pressman	Original by HiT Entertainment and Dianna Basso	9 September 2016	2006
Thomas has trouble with the Troublesome Trucks yet again in the yard. When Samson arrives with a goods train, his brake van, named Bradford, sees Thomas and offers to help. Bradford puts the Troublesome Trucks in their place easily. Every other engine thinks Thomas is lucky to have a brake van like Bradford. However, after being delayed at the Blue Mountain Quarry, Thomas does not feel Bradford means any good. After delaying Whiff, Henry, and many other of his friends, Thomas goes without Bradford for one day, even though he shouts at Thomas that he needs to talk with him. Thomas collides and derails Percy's trucks at the other side of Gordon's Hill. When Sir Topham Hatt hears of the accident, he scolds Thomas for not using a brake van and tells that following the rules and staying safe is more important than being on time. Bradford tells Thomas and his friends that he is sorry for the troubles he caused lately, and that he is leaving to go with Samson back to the Mainland again. Everyone is happy that Bradford is leaving Sodor for a while, including the Troublesome Trucks.
472	6	"Saving Time"	Dianna Basso	Andrew Brenner	Original by HiT Entertainment and Dianna Basso	21 November 2016	2007
Samson comes to Sodor to help out with bringing stone from the Blue Mountain Quarry. At the quarry, he asks Sir Handel about some extra trucks on a siding. Sir Handel explains that they are indeed meant to be brought to the docks, but that Samson should come back for them later. While attempting to go up Gordon's Hill, Samson gets stuck and tries again. Thomas helps him, and they get some extra help from Paxton. Sir Topham Hatt is not pleased with the delay, and Samson tries to be more careful, by only bringing a single truck and a brake van.
473	7	"Ryan and Daisy"	Dianna Basso	Davey Moore	Original by HiT Entertainment and Dianna Basso	22 November 2016	2008
Despite being different from each other, Ryan and Daisy work together on the branch line between Harwick and Arlesburgh. One day, Ryan arrives at Arlesburgh West to see the Fat Controller. He tells Ryan that he is giving Ryan and Daisy extra duties. Ryan later tells Daisy about her mail run, but she says Ryan would do it better, so Ryan takes the responsibility for the mail. However, when he is late to help Toby with the stone deliveries to Arlesburgh, it really gives Ryan more and more to do and causes more delays as well. Another day, Ryan almost collides with Duck, and he also hurries to the quarry with his coaches and the passengers do not like it at all. Sir Topham Hatt is cross with Daisy, but the problem is solved when Daisy finally helps out by doing her own work and Ryan's work.
474	8	"Pouty James"	Dianna Basso	Andrew Brenner	Original by HiT Entertainment and Dianna Basso	23 November 2016	2011
James is known to show off too much, and he always wants to be the center of attention. One day, he goes too far with his boasting and Sir Topham Hatt takes away his passenger trains, irritated with his behavior. James is left in the shed next morning after sulking, but is let out after he promises to behave. James is not happy when he discovers that he has to pull garbage trucks. He goes around in a sulk, taking too long getting from point A to B, which in turn annoys Sir Topham Hatt again. At Brendam Docks, James is teased again, until it makes him laugh. From that day on, he changes his attitude and does whatever work he needs to, but another engine will always alert him when he starts getting grumpy again.
475	9	"Blown Away"	Dianna Basso	Helen Farrall	Original by HiT Entertainment and Dianna Basso	24 November 2016	2012
A heavy storm is arriving at the Island of Sodor. At Arlesburgh, Skiff's new captain, Joe, checks that everything is secure. Duck and Oliver are just finishing their passenger runs, and tease Skiff for being a little rail boat. Captain Joe reassures Skiff they just said this because they are worried about him. When Joe checks over the pirate ship, Skiff is suddenly blown away down the track, and crashes into a tree that has fallen over onto the track. He manages to get himself free and waves his sail, preventing Duck and Oliver from crashing. The following morning, they have decided that Skiff deserves a gift, and together with Sir Topham Hatt and Harvey, they cheer for Skiff, who they reckon is the bravest little rail boat they have met.
476	10	"The Way She Does It"	Dianna Basso	Davey Moore	Original by HiT Entertainment and Dianna Basso	25 November 2016	2013
Sir Topham Hatt gives Daisy a special, to bring some entertainers for a performance. Daisy is excited, and boasts that the entertainers would choose a railcar like her. Engines like Thomas, Duck and Oliver are not that surprised, and neither is Ryan, who says that sheep still prefer tank engines. The next day, Daisy does not take the usual passengers with dogs, ice cream, or sand, and when Stafford is about to couple a truck up to her at Knapford, Daisy refuses to pull the truck and leaves without it with the two entertainers inside her. Daisy finds out that the entertainers are puppet show entertainers when she arrives at Harwick station. Sir Topham Hatt arrives, and Daisy realizes she has let everyone down. She comes up with an idea, which saves the entire situation. Not liking it at first, she uses one of her windows for the stage and she eventually likes it.
477	11	"Letters to Santa"	Dianna Basso	Helen Farrall	Original by HiT Entertainment and Dianna Basso	27 December 2016 (Note: This episode was first released on the Thomas's Christmas Carol DVD on 7 November 2016.)	2002
Percy still remembers the time he raced against Harold the Helicopter. One day, he is bringing letters to Santa, and thinks that Harold is calling him slow and out of date again, and decides to not listen while he tries to make up for lost time due to the snow. Not realizing that Harold is trying to warn him, Percy ends up in a blocked tunnel of snow. Harold offers to take the mail to Hiro, which Percy accepts. Thinking Harold is bothering him, Hiro says that Percy never arrived. Harold explains, as Hiro comes to a stop. The following day, Percy looks after Harold, and finds him on the other side of the Vicarstown Bridge. Harold says he has run out of fuel, and Percy gets some fuel for him, saying that friends are to help each other, and it will soon be Christmas.
478	12	"Love Me Tender"	Dianna Basso	Davey Moore	Original by HiT Entertainment and Dianna Basso	28 December 2016	2010
Snow has arrived early to the Island of Sodor, and Donald and Douglas work together to clear the tracks. While at a junction, they have a choice: to clear Edward’s branch line or clear the track to the Search & Rescue Centre. While Douglas suggests the branch line, Donald wants to clear the track to the rescue centre. After clearing the track there, they head back onto the mainline, but find themselves stuck behind Toby. Later, at Kirk Ronan Junction, they face another option: the main line or the track to Ulfstead Castle. Douglas does not say anything, and the two soon pull each other's ends before Douglas is left without his tender. Thomas tells Donald about the tender, and Donald searches for Douglas. After asking Toby, he goes back to the junction, and finds his brother again. Donald later brings Douglas to the Steamworks to be repaired. Like all brothers, they sometime argue, but they always get back together again.
479	13	"The Railcar and the Coaches"	Dianna Basso	Davey Moore	Original by HiT Entertainment and Dianna Basso	29 December 2016	2009
Daisy does not think she would ever need Annie and Clarabel when she is tasked to take care of passengers on Thomas' Branch Line while he is put on quarry duty. But one day, she does need them due to her popularity among Thomas' passengers. While out on the branch line, Annie and Clarabel say they hear a mysterious sound, which sounds like creaking. Daisy stops at a station and gets uncoupled before rushing away. After talking to Sir Topham Hatt, she goes to the Dieselworks. Sir Topham Hatt speaks to Annie and Clarabel, and says that two wrongs do not make a right. Another day, Thomas informs his coaches that Daisy is back to her original work, but that he is still on quarry duty, and that Sir Topham Hatt has sent another engine to work on his branch line. The engine sent to work with Annie and Clarabel is Diesel, much to their horror and dismay.
480	14	"Mucking About"	Dianna Basso	Davey Moore	Original by HiT Entertainment and Dianna Basso	5 June 2017	2014
Thomas enjoys the competition of Max and Monty but begins to question his friendship as Max and Monty mess about while working, affecting Thomas' work. Edward advises Thomas to ignore them. His suspicions prove correct as Max and Monty dump their waste on the rails, causing Thomas to derail. Luckily, Oliver the Excavator helps with clearing the tracks from the waste and Judy and Jerome help to get Thomas back onto the tracks. Max and Monty feel sorry for Thomas and Thomas tells them that he won't be racing with them anymore.
481	15	"Cautious Connor"	Dianna Basso	Andrew Brenner	Original by HiT Entertainment and Dianna Basso	6 June 2017	2015
Connor boasts of being the fastest engine, but one day, he breaks down on the Island of Sodor and goes to the Steamworks to be repaired. Connor starts to get worried it will happen again if he goes too fast and after that, Connor starts to become the slowest engine on the island. They even start to worry that Connor would never go fast again, until Thomas makes Stephen tell about his past of speeds and breaking down.
482	16	"All in Vain"	Dianna Basso	Helen Farrall	Original by HiT Entertainment and Dianna Basso	7 June 2017	2016
James is asked to take Sir Topham Hatt and the Mayor of Sodor to a party at Callan Castle, but has to do other jobs first and every job he does, he gets dirtier and dirtier. He finally has the chance for a washdown, but James is horrified to find a little scratch on his paintwork. He goes to the Steamworks for the scratch to be painted, but leaves before the paint dries and is mortified to find leaves, twigs, and dust stuck to his paintwork, leaving Edward to take his place.
483	17	"Buckled Tracks and Bumpy Trucks"	Dianna Basso	Lee Pressman	Original by HiT Entertainment and Dianna Basso	8 June 2017	2017
483	17	"Buckled Tracks and Bumpy Cars"	Dianna Basso	Lee Pressman	Original by HiT Entertainment and Dianna Basso	8 June 2017	2017
One sunny day, the tracks buckle and bend and Dowager Hatt gives her son Sir Topham a new hat, which everyone calls a safari hat. Sir Topham Hatt gets sick of everyone teasing him and tries to find a way to get rid of it. Meanwhile, a piece of glass from Whiff's garbage trucks falls out and lands on the ground causing a fire. Belle derails due to the buckled rails, meaning a solution has to be found.
484	18	"Tit for Tat"	Dianna Basso	Andrew Brenner	Small Railway Engines by Rev. W. Awdry	9 June 2017	2018
Some visitors come to the island to take photos of engines. They visit the Arlesdale Railway and take pictures of the small engines, but Bert is cross that they will not take pictures of him. As they are driving, they spray Bert with mud and Bert wants to take revenge on them. He devises a plan.
485	19	"Mike's Whistle"	Dianna Basso	Andrew Brenner	Small Railway Engines by Rev. W. Awdry	12 June 2017	2019
Duck's driver boils an egg in his whistle, which is now clogged and makes a funny noise. The engines tease Duck about his whistle, especially Mike who says engines without whistles are improper engines. Later, he pulls passengers on the line and encounters a cow. He blows his whistle so hard that it flies far away into a field. Mike insists they look for his lost whistle, but the passengers decide to whistle for him instead.
486	20	"Useful Railway"	Dianna Basso	Andrew Brenner	Small Railway Engines by Rev. W. Awdry	13 June 2017	2020
Mike is annoyed of always being stuck behind animals, Rex boasts to the small engines about how easy wool deliveries are. The Small Controller gives him the first wool train. Willie the tractor driver accidentally drops his load of wool onto the tracks, which causes Rex to derail.
487	21	"Henry in the Dark"	Dianna Basso	Lee Pressman	Original by HiT Entertainment and Dianna Basso	24 July 2017 (Note: This episode was first released on the Extraordinary Engines DVD on 3 April 2017.)	2021
At the Steamworks, Henry is accidentally given some "glow in the dark" paint. Everyone he comes across runs away from him, thinking that he is a ghost train. The next morning, Gordon and James tease him for being scared all the time, especially of the rain, so Henry comes up with a plan to pay them back later that night.
488	22	"Three Steam Engines Gruff"	Dianna Basso	Andrew Brenner	Original by HiT Entertainment and Dianna Basso	25 July 2017	2022
One night, Percy is frightened by a strange sound from under the bridge at the Watermill. Toby is also worried, but Thomas does not believe it to be true, until he too hears the sound. Toby and Percy believe it is a troll telling the story of how three goats had to cross a bridge with a troll under it. The trio become terrified of passing the bridge until it is revealed the sound was only coming from a cow stuck under the bridge.
489	23	"Engine of the Future"	Dianna Basso	Andrew Brenner	Original by HiT Entertainment and Dianna Basso	26 July 2017	2023
When a rail Zeppelin called Hugo comes to Sodor, everyone at first is very impressed. However, Stephen is concerned they will be replaced by engines like Hugo, making the engines worry about their future. They take their anxiety out on Hugo, making him feel unwelcome.
490	24	"Hugo and the Airship"	Dianna Basso	Andrew Brenner	Original by HiT Entertainment and Dianna Basso	27 July 2017	2024
After word of an airship resembling Hugo spreads, Hugo feels he should be able to fly just like it. He gets some encouragement from Skiff and tries to take off into the sky like an airship on Gordon's Hill, like his non-rail aerial counterpart.
491	25	"The Missing Breakdown Train"	Dianna Basso	Davey Moore	Original by HiT Entertainment and Dianna Basso	28 July 2017	2025
Judy and Jerome are upset that they are never taken out any more as Rocky is now the official crane of the island. Ryan, who feels sorry for them, takes Judy and Jerome out for a change of scenery. He takes them to Arlesburgh Harbour which they find boring after a while, leading to Duck and Oliver taking them around the island. Eventually, Daisy has an accident and Ryan has to find them.
492	26	"Skiff and the Mermaid"	Dianna Basso	Helen Farrall	Original by HiT Entertainment and Dianna Basso	31 July 2017	2026
Skiff hears word of a mermaid statue arriving at a museum at Arlesburgh Harbour, believing it is real. Later on when Sir Topham Hatt and his grandchildren want to have a ride on board Skiff, he mistakes a whale's tail in the water for a mermaid and ends up dragging Sir Topham Hatt on him to the sea in search of it. Sir Topham does not know how to drive him, resulting in the two of them getting stuck on an island at Bluff's Cove.
493	27	"The Christmas Coffeepot"	Dianna Basso	Helen Farrall	Original by HiT Entertainment and Dianna Basso	14 December 2017 (Note: This episode was first released on the Full Steam to the Rescue! DVD on 24 October 2016.)	2101
Marion hears a voice behind a tree and assumes the tree is talking. She tries to tell everyone, but nobody believes her. Thomas becomes curious and investigates, only to rediscover Glynn the Coffeepot Engine. He and Percy are worried he will be scrapped, but it turns out he will be restored by the Earl.
494	28	"Over the Hill"	Dianna Basso	Helen Farrall	Original by HiT Entertainment and Dianna Basso	20 December 2017	2102
Stephen becomes jealous of all the attention Glynn is receiving from the Earl and becomes worried he will become a stationary attraction at his new railway museum. To determine who will be the exhibit, Stephen challenges Glynn to a race.
