= Thomas & Friends series 22 =

Season of television series

Thomas & Friends
- Series 22
- A picture released as part of Mattel's marketing campaign when the updates were announced
- No. of episodes: 26

Release
- Original network: Channel 5
- Original release: 3 September 2018 – 15 May 2019

Series chronology
- ← Previous; Series 21 Next → Series 23

Thomas & Friends is a children's television series about the engines and other characters on the railways of the Island of Sodor, and is based on The Railway Series books written by the Reverend W. Awdry.

This article lists and details episodes from the twenty-second series of the show, which began airing on 3 September 2018 in the UK, and on 17 September 2018 in the US.

Retitled as Thomas & Friends: Big World, Big Adventures!, Series 22 saw the first major changes since the show switched to full CGI animation in the thirteenth series. The episodes kept their eleven-minute-long runtime, but were now divided into seven minute-long stories, with an additional four minutes reserved for a variety of segments, such as sing-along karaoke songs and music videos, or Thomas talking directly with the audience about lessons learned during a particular episode.

== Production ==
Production for series 22 began in the fall of 2017. Clips of the series were released in October of that year, almost a year before its premiere on television.

The series introduced new characters Nia and Rebecca and also retired third-person narration, with Thomas now talking directly to the audience about the day's episode and during the learning segments. In addition, the show had a brand new theme song. Similar to the trains in Chuggington, the vehicular characters now move their bodies full-time.

The series is set directly after the events of the Big World! Big Adventures! movie. Episodes are split into two halves; the first half sees Thomas travelling around the world, while the second half takes place back on the Island of Sodor.

== Voice cast ==
The following voice actors were listed in the closing credits for the series:

- Joseph May as Thomas (US)
- John Hasler as Thomas (UK)
- Chipo Chung
- Dona Adwera
- Teresa Gallagher
- Siu-See Hung
- Dan Li
- Windson Liong
- Keith Wickham

The following are also considered main characters but were not listed in the credits:

- Yvonne Grundy voices Nia, an orange steam train from Kenya. She is based on the East African Railways’ ED1 class steam train.
- Rachael Miller voices Rebecca, a yellow steam train from the Mainland Britain. Her design is based on a Southern Railway West Country 4-6-2 Pacific steam train.

== Episodes ==
No. overall	No. in series	UK Title (top) US Title (bottom)	Directed by	Written by	Original release date	TV Order
513	1	"Number One Engine"	Dianna Basso	Davey Moore	3 September 2018	37a
Thomas is in China taking passenger trains with An An and Lin Yong, where he gets into trouble while racing with Hong-Mei, another blue tank engine, and the number 1 engine in China.
514	2	"Forever and Ever"	Dianna Basso	Andrew Brenner	4 September 2018	37b
With all the changes being made to the railway, such as Edward and now Henry leaving Tidmouth Sheds and Nia staying in Edward's place, Gordon is feeling a little blue, so Nia has to help him get used to it.
515	3	"Confusion Without Delay"	Dianna Basso	Davey Moore	5 September 2018	38a
A new tender engine named Rebecca comes to work on the North Western Railway, but gets clumsy and blocks the Flying Scotsman's platform at Vicarstown early, makes her passengers late by leaving the stations early, and blocks the engines down at Brendam Docks.
516	4	"Trusty Trunky"	Dianna Basso	Becky Overton	6 September 2018	38b
While working on the Indian Railway, seeing new places, finding animals all around on the lines, and meeting Rajiv, Noor Jehan, and Shankar, Ashima tells Thomas that elephants used to work in the yards shunting trucks. When Thomas derails in a muddy pond, he is very surprised when an elephant comes to his rescue.
517	5	"What Rebecca Does"	Dianna Basso	Davey Moore	7 September 2018	39a
After admiring Belle's water cannons for putting out fires, Marion's steam shovel for digging holes and playing games, and Harvey's crane hook for lifting crates and putting Bill, Ben, and the Troublesome Trucks back on the tracks, Rebecca is worried that, unlike the other engines, there is nothing special about her.
518	6	"Thomas Goes to Bollywood"	Dianna Basso	Becky Overton	10 September 2018	39b
When an action movie is filmed on the Indian railway, Thomas is desperate to be involved.
519	7	"Thomas in the Wild"	Dianna Basso	Davey Moore	11 September 2018	40a
Yong Bao informs Thomas about Pandas as the national animal in China, so he looks hard for one in the bamboo forests while taking the film crew, An An and Lin Yong to the Nature Reserve.
520	8	"Thomas and the Monkey Palace"	Dianna Basso	Becky Overton	12 September 2018	40b
Thomas is pulling a truckload of coconuts to the Indian Railway Station for Charubala and her friends when he encounters some cheeky monkeys at the Monkey palace, despite Rajiv's warnings.
521	9	"An Engine of Many Colours"	Dianna Basso	Michael White	13 September 2018	41a
521	9	"An Engine of Many Colors"	Dianna Basso	Michael White	13 September 2018	41a
After a crash at the back of Tidmouth Sheds for showing off, a sad James is waiting at the Steamworks to be repaired. He hears that there might not be enough red paint to repaint him and gets worried he will be repainted a different colour. He dreams about being blue like Edward, green like Henry, and silver (which doesn't bother him) like Spencer, and gets into a crash while showing off in every dream.: Note: This episode is set after the previous season 21 episode, "The Fastest Red Engine on Sodor" and during the events of "A Shed for Edward".
522	10	"Outback Thomas"	Dianna Basso	Tim Bain	14 September 2018	41b
Shane shows Thomas the Outbacks of Australia, leading Thomas to take his coaches, Aubrey and Aiden, and some passengers on the Outback tour, only to take a wrong turn and get stuck on a high bridge.
523	11	"School of Duck"	Dianna Basso	Lee Pressman	17 September 2018	42a
When a storm destroys a classroom at Harwick School, Duck tries to find a coach to take the children in, but fails when everyone seems unable to spare a coach, with Toby using Hannah while Henrietta is away, Edward using the Slip Coaches, Emily using hers, and Gordon just saying no. When he finds a coach named Dexter, Duck only gets bad news that reveals that Dexter has some bad wheels. He then chooses to take Reg's advice on recycling to take Judy and Jerome to help out Dexter and make him useful again.
524	12	"Tiger Trouble"	Dianna Basso	Becky Overton	18 September 2018	42b
When Ashima tells Thomas that tourists come to India to try to see tigers in Noor Jehan's tiger safari trains, he wants to see the tigers too. After seeing a tiger, Thomas learns from Shankar that Tiger Hunters want to kidnap the tigers, leading the two to save the tigers from some Tiger Hunters in Rajiv's passenger train.
525	13	"Seeing is Believing"	Dianna Basso	Andrew Brenner	19 September 2018	43a
Thomas' friend Merlin comes to Sodor from the Mainland for the first time, and Percy wants to see him.
526	14	"Apology Impossible"	Dianna Basso	Becky Overton	20 September 2018	43b
James starts to insult Philip and not say sorry to him. But when Philip takes the Troublesome Trucks of sardines over the fenland track, James blocks his way and causes Thomas, Paxton, and Rebecca to stop behind them, Philip learns that sometimes even the smallest engine's actions can make them the bigger engine.
527	15	"The Water Wheel"	Dianna Basso	Davey Moore	21 September 2018	44a
Thomas thinks he has been given very silly cargo until Hong-Mei explains that it is a very important water wheel, made from bamboo, but Thomas loses it while taking a shortcut and tries to get it back.
528	16	"Samson and the Fireworks"	Dianna Basso	Lee Pressman	5 November 2018	44b
Samson is terrified of fireworks as Thomas finds out, and when Samson mistakes the sound of Cyril the Fogman's warning detonator for fireworks, he is so frightened that he races off with Bradford into the fog and gets lost, only for him to follow Sir Robert Norramby's fireworks display at Ulfsted Castle during the night.
529	17	"Runaway Truck"	Dianna Basso	Davey Moore	3 December 2018 (Note: This episode was first released on the Here Comes the Steam Team! DVD on September 24, 2018.)	45a
529	17	"Runaway Car"	Dianna Basso	Davey Moore	3 December 2018	45a
Thomas tries to save one of the Troublesome Trucks of China, named Lei, but fails to do so. Yong Bao teaches Thomas all about tai chi, and Thomas soon uses it to rescue Lei, who is racing down the tracks again.
530	18	"Thomas' Animal Ark"	Dianna Basso	Lee Pressman	10 December 2018	45b
It's Christmas, Thomas has to find a way to keep the animals warm when the park's boiler broke down.
531	19	"Cyclone Thomas"	Dianna Basso	Tim Bain	17 December 2018	46a
Thomas wants to be just like Isla, a Flying Doctor's plane, who transports Dr. Claire to remote places where it is hard for patients to get to hospitals or doctors for treatment, but fails to do so. When a cyclone come in, Thomas is determined to save the day.
532	20	"Kangaroo Christmas"	Dianna Basso	Tim Bain	22 December 2018	46b
Thomas is in Australia for Christmas, and is disappointed that it is different from Sodor due to no snow. But in the meantime, he must help a little girl named Madeleine retrieve her toy kangaroo from a real one.
533	21	"Thomas and the Dragon"	Dianna Basso	Davey Moore	5 February 2019	47a
Thomas is terrified when he is given the honor from Yong Bao of bringing a dragon to the Chinese New Year celebrations, thinking it would be a real fire breathing dragon.
534	22	"Rosie is Red"	Dianna Basso	Davey Moore	14 February 2019	47b
During Valentine's Day, Thomas and Rosie try to avoid each other after Bill and Ben tease them for being "special friends", but they must come through their fears when Sir Topham Hatt asks them both to prepare his Valentine's Day surprise for Lady Hatt at Vicarstown.
535	23	"The Case of the Puzzling Parts"	Dianna Basso	Davey Moore	18 February 2019	48a
Sidney is shunting a flatbed of engine parts, but he cannot remember what he is supposed to be doing with them since Diesel jolted his memory. Paxton thinks this sounds like a kind of mystery that can only be solved by a Special Agent.
536	24	"Banjo and the Bushfire"	Dianna Basso	Tim Bain	19 February 2019	48b
Thomas offers a lift to a ranger named Ranger Jill while working in the Australian Rain Forest. Thomas is excited to learn from her about all the animals that live there, but he is too loud and impatient to be very useful.
537	25	"Counting on Nia"	Dianna Basso	Lee Pressman	20 February 2019	49a
Nia is a really clever engine and knows about all sorts of things, but when Sir Topham Hatt asks her to take Annie and Clarabel and pick up passengers from Knapford Station to Thomas' Branch line, Nia has great trouble reading numbers so Annie and Clarabel teach her.
538	26	"Hunt the Truck"	Dianna Basso	Michael White	15 May 2019	49b
538	26	"Hunt the Car"	Dianna Basso	Michael White	15 May 2019	49b
Bill and Ben's latest game consists of hiding trucks and making other engines look for them. But when the twins hide a van full of Sir Robert Norramby's Christmas supplies for Edward to collect, they try to return it, but have to travel all over Sodor to look for it.
