= Thomas & Friends series 18 =

Season of television series

Thomas & Friends
- Series 18
- Official cover art for the series 18 DVD
- No. of episodes: 26

Release
- Original network: Channel 5
- Original release: 25 August 2014 – 31 July 2015

Series chronology
- ← Previous; Series 17 Next → Series 19

Thomas & Friends is a children's television series about the engines and other characters working on the railways of the Island of Sodor, and is based on The Railway Series books written by Wilbert Awdry.

This article lists and details episodes from the eighteenth series of the show, which was first broadcast in 2014. Some episodes in this series have two titles: the original titles are indicated in bold, with the American-adapted titles underneath. This series was narrated by Mark Moraghan for audiences in the United Kingdom and United States.

This series was also the last to utilize the new series intro and credits and also the original Engine Roll Call in the US/UK broadcasts. Starting from series 19, it utilizes the remix version of the Engine Roll Call and the theme tune.

== Episodes ==
No. overall	No. in series	UK title (top) US title (bottom)	Directed by	Written by	Original release date	TV Order
415	1	"Old Reliable Edward"	David Stoten	Andrew Brenner	25 August 2014	1101a
Gordon stalls on his hill when he confuses a red pair of trousers for a danger flag. Edward helps him up the hill, but Gordon does not thank him. Thomas plots to avenge Edward by challenging Gordon to a race the next day. Thomas tricks Gordon into giving him a head start, allowing him to cut in front of Gordon and intentionally slow down, causing Gordon to stall on the hill again. Edward refuses to help Gordon, citing the insults Gordon gave him. Gordon desperately apologises, takes back his insults, and thanks Edward when he helps him up the hill.
416	2	"Not So Slow Coaches"	David Stoten	Paul Larson & Laura Beaumont	26 August 2014	1101b
Annie and Clarabel complain when Thomas travels too fast with them, prompting him to tease them. One day, when Thomas leaves the two to take trucks to the quarry, Charlie mistakenly couples Annie and Clarabel to the back of Caitlin, who takes a high speed passenger train unaware of Annie and Clarabel. Thomas notices upon returning to the train yard and chases after Caitlin, who remains unaware. Caitlin departs to the mainland; the drawbridge prevents Thomas from catching up. After Thomas loses hope, Hiro presents him with Annie and Clarabel, having stopped Caitlin and rescued the two. Annie and Clarabel vow to never complain to Thomas again.
417	3	"Flatbeds of Fear"	David Stoten	Paul Larson & Laura Beaumont	27 August 2014	1102a
At Brendam Docks, a shipment of metal pipes during windy weather creates a whistling sound the engines find ominous. Salty tells Thomas the noise is from the fabled "Flatbeds of Fear". Henry is worried while Emily insists there is a reasonable explanation, but both end up being too frightened by the sound to deliver the shipment. Cranky explains to Thomas the source of the sound, and Salty admits he was only teasing.
418	4	"Disappearing Diesels"	David Stoten	Andrew Brenner	28 August 2014	1102b
Paxton is friendly towards everybody, but only Diesel does not reciprocate. Diesel tells the other diesel engines to play a prank on Paxton by pretending to have disappeared. Paxton falls for the prank, but Diesel chooses to elongate the prank while the others feel guilty. Paxton searches all over Sodor for the diesels, and gives chase to Diesel when he spots him. Diesel breaks down on his way to the quarry and explains the prank to Paxton, who helps him to the Dieselworks unbotheredly.
419	5	"Signals Crossed"	David Stoten	Mark Huckerby & Nick Ostler	29 August 2014	1103a
Toby struggles to navigate the complex junction at Knapford Station, which he finds overwhelming. He is unable to understand the signals and runs away. Thomas finds Toby hiding behind a signal box and explains how the signals work; Toby must watch the signal directly above him. Toby successfully reaches his platform and picks up his passengers. Remembering Thomas' advice, Toby waits for the signal above him. James becomes annoyed with waiting behind him and attempts to push him past the signal. Sir Topham Hatt arrives to scold Toby for the delay, but notices that the signal is broken and praises Toby for noticing.
420	6	"Toad's Adventure"	David Stoten	Mark Huckerby & Nick Ostler	1 September 2014	1103b
Toad is bored of Oliver repeating the same story of his escape from the scrap yard and longs for his own adventure. Toad offers to go with James, who is to haul a freight train and reluctantly agrees. James ignores Toad's advice about going too fast, and his train becomes a runaway after uncoupling on Gordon's Hill. The train heads towards Thomas, who is transporting Sir Topham Hatt and Dowager Hatt, and Percy who is behind Thomas. After stopping the train from colliding just in time, Toad defends James and receives praise from the Hatts. Toad is satisfied with now having his own story to tell.
421	7	"Duck in the Water"	David Stoten	Andrew Brenner	2 September 2014	1104a
James is sent to rescue Duck when he gets stuck in a puddle on the tracks. James brings Rocky the rail crane but refuses to wait for his crane arm to be secured. Rocky's arm swings violently and accidentally knocks over a signal, but James still refuses. After arriving at the scene, Oliver and Percy collide with Rocky as they could not see the signal, delaying Duck's rescue with each collision. When Sir Topham Hatt arrives, Rocky takes the blame before James explains the situation and accidentally admits it was his fault. James is assigned with taking Duck's freight train in his absence.
422	8	"Duck and the Slip Coaches"	David Stoten	Mark Huckerby & Nick Ostler	3 September 2014	1104b
Many tourists visit Sodor during the summer, prompting Sir Topham Hatt to become concerned with the high number of delays. Duck tells the engines about the slip coaches he worked with on his old railway, and James later tells the idea to Sir Topham, who has Duck's old coaches sent to Sodor. James takes the credit, dismaying Duck. James performs the first slip coach journey, but fails to utilise them properly. Duck explains to Sir Topham that he knows how to use slip coaches and exposes James for stealing the credit. Duck is reunited with the slip coaches and utilises them successfully, reducing delays.
423	9	"Thomas the Quarry Engine"	David Stoten	Andrew Brenner	4 September 2014	1105a
When Thomas and Diesel are sent to collect the Troublesome Trucks from Farquhar Quarry, they argue about who should be the back engine. Then Diesel suggests he take the Troublesome Trucks with Mavis, who wants to see more of Sodor, and leave Thomas to look after the quarry until they get back. But when they do not come back, Thomas gets fed up from waiting and decides to take another load of the Troublesome Trucks on his own and then there is real trouble.
424	10	"Thomas and the Emergency Cable"	David Stoten	Andrew Brenner	5 September 2014	1105b
Thomas meets a birdwatcher who frequently boards his branch line passenger train in search of a rare bird. On one journey, the birdwatcher accidentally pulls Annie's emergency cable, giving her a flat spot. Thomas is forced to only take Clarabel on passenger journey while Annie must wait for replacement wheels to arrive. Thomas develops a grudge and refuses to stop at a station when he sees the birdwatcher there, but is forced to stop there when a passenger pulls Clarabel's emergency cable, needing to get off at that station. Sir Topham scolds Thomas for the act, explaining that the birdwatcher is sorry for his mistake. Annie is eventually repaired, and the birdwatcher finds the bird he was searching for.
425	11	"Duncan and the Grumpy Passenger"	Don Spencer	Davey Moore	8 September 2014	1106a
Duncan, the grumpiest engine on the narrow gauge railway, gets a taste of his own medicine when he receives a very grumpy passenger. He tries his hardest to help the passenger so that they will stop complaining, but soon learns that it is impossible to please everybody.
426	12	"Marion and the Pipe"	Don Spencer	Mark Huckerby & Nick Ostler	9 September 2014	1106b
Marion uncovers what she thinks is the mast of a Viking ship while doing some repairs on an embankment. Thomas suspects that she may have hit a water pipe, but Marion is not so sure. The following day, when Thomas notices flooding near the bank, she has to reassess her opinion.
427	13	"Missing Gator"	Don Spencer	Andrew Brenner	10 September 2014	1107a
Percy misses his old friend Gator and ends up rushing around as he takes Cranky's advice and tries to keep his mind occupied from thinking about him. He is so busy that he loses control of the Troublesome Trucks, which roll into an old mine. At first, Percy is afraid to go after them, but then he remembers what Gator taught him about being brave.
428	14	"No Steam Without Coal"	Don Spencer	Davey Moore	11 September 2014	1107b
Bill and Ben run out of coal during a shortage at Clay Pits and have to rely on Timothy, who runs on oil, to help them out. It was Ben's fault to not get the coal as planned, and he told Marion that it was probably enough coal in the hopper. But Marion was concerned about this, and it later became something out of chaos. Eventually Timothy gets the coal, and Bill and Ben agree that oil going engines have their uses, especially when they're out of "coal".
429	15	"Spencer's VIP"	Don Spencer	Andrew Brenner	12 September 2014	1108a
Spencer brings a VIP back from the mainland, but is so intent on doing a good job that he does not notice that he has been sent down the wrong track. By the time he arrives, they are so late that the passenger refuses to travel back with him and the other engines all compete for the privilege.
430	16	"Toad's Bright Idea"	Don Spencer	Davey Moore	15 September 2014	1108b
It is a slow day for Gator when he finds himself sitting around with nothing to do. However, when Oliver breaks down, Gator is more than happy to help. He collects Oliver's trucks and promises him he will bring them back in the morning. There is another problem when Gator's lamp keeps going out. He knows he will be late so he decides not to stop. Toad however argues that it is not safe. Toad has a light bulb moment, and he comes up with an idea that will help him deliver the trucks safely and on time. Note: This episode takes place during the events of Tale of the Brave.
431	17	"Long Lost Friend"	Don Spencer	Mark Huckerby & Nick Ostler	23 December 2014	1109a
Gator returns to the Island of Sodor after being away for a long time. He is looking forward to seeing his old friend Percy. When Percy hears that Gator is back, he is very excited and immediately heads off to see him. But the two engines keep missing each other. They both have doubts they will see each other, but finally they connect and have a wonderful reunion.
432	18	"Last Train for Christmas"	Don Spencer	Andrew Brenner	24 December 2014	1109b
It's Christmas Eve and a lot of passengers are coming home to Sodor for the holiday. Connor can't carry all the passengers who are trying to get on his train. He promises to come back and pick them up, but the snow keeps falling and the engines are struggling to keep the tracks clear. It becomes a race against time, and the engines have to work together to clear the tracks and get the passengers home in time for Christmas.
433	19	"Duncan the Humbug"	Don Spencer	Davey Moore	25 December 2014	1110a
Everyone is happy at Christmas time except for Duncan, the Scottish narrow gauge engine, who seems to be grumbling even more than usual. Victor offers Duncan a new coat of paint if he can refrain from grumbling for one whole day. Duncan rises to the challenge, but it is not so easy for an engine who likes to grumble to give up a lifetime habit.
434	20	"The Perfect Gift"	Don Spencer	Davey Moore	26 December 2014	1110b
The whole island is celebrating Christmas and there are decorations everywhere. But it doesn't look very much like Christmas at the scrap yard. Percy starts to worry that Reg is missing out and he tries to find something to give Reg to cheer him up. But Reg only seems happy about scrap. Percy discovers that Reg is celebrating Christmas in his own way and has been making decorations from the scrap.
435	21	"Emily Saves the World"	Don Spencer	Paul Larson & Laura Beaumont	27 July 2015 (Note: This episode was first released on the Dinos & Discoveries DVD on 12 January 2015.)	1111a
Emily gets overly excited whilst taking a special to the Animal Park and loses a giant model of the world on her way to the Sodor Zoo. The giant world globe rolls down the railway tracks, and eventually stops, and Emily gets it back on the flatbed and delivers it as planned to the Sodor Zoo.
436	22	"Timothy and the Rainbow Truck"	Don Spencer	Davey Moore	28 July 2015	1111b
436	22	"Timothy and the Rainbow Car"	Don Spencer	Davey Moore	28 July 2015	1111b
Bill and Ben trick Timothy into going on an island-wide search for a multi-coloured rainbow truck. It is said to be red, orange, yellow, green, blue, indigo and violet. But when the oil-burning engine realizes he's been duped, Salty helps him find a clever way of making the twin's trickery come back to bite them.
437	23	"Marion and the Dinosaurs"	Don Spencer	Andrew Brenner	29 July 2015	1112a
Marion thinks she saw dinosaurs in the middle of the night, but passes it off as a dream. She then gets a real shock when they seem to be real.
438	24	"Samson at Your Service"	Don Spencer	Davey Moore	30 July 2015	1112b
After losing his way on his first day, new engine Samson has become a laughing stock among the engines. The strong little tank engine is determined to get through his day without making any mistakes, but has no such luck.
439	25	"Samson Sent for Scrap"	Don Spencer	Mark Huckerby & Nick Ostler	31 July 2015	1113a
When Scruff breaks down, Samson is sent to help Harvey collect scrap from the lineside, but Samson takes his instructions a little too literally.
440	26	"Millie and the Volcano"	Don Spencer	Andrew Brenner	31 July 2015	1113b
When Millie is startled by the head of a model dinosaur, Samson makes fun of her and the French narrow gauge engine is determined to get her own back.
