= Thomas & Friends series 23 =

Season of television series

Thomas & Friends
- Series 23
- No. of episodes: 20 (+3 half-hour specials)

Release
- Original network: Channel 5
- Original release: 2 September 2019 – 15 May 2020

Series chronology
- ← Previous; Series 22 Next → Series 24

Thomas & Friends is a children's television series about the engines and other characters on the railways of the Island of Sodor, and is based on The Railway Series books written by the Reverend W. Awdry.

This article lists and details episodes from the twenty-third series show, which first aired on 18 May 2019 in the US. It consisted of 20 11-minute episodes as well as three 20-minute specials, two of which are directly interconnected and form a movie titled Digs and Discoveries. It was the last season to air on the Nick Jr. Channel in the US, with 2 specials aired.

The season was developed with the aim of encouraging preschoolers to learn about new customs, as Thomas travels to Brazil, Italy, China, India, and Australia. Another continuing theme was "girl power".

== Voice cast ==
- John Hasler as Thomas (UK)
- Joseph May as Thomas (US)
- Federico Trujillo as Raul, a Batucada Musician, and a Brazilian Workman
- Monica Lopera as Gabriela
- Laura Cucurullo as Cassia and a Batucata Musician
- Francisco Labbe as Gustavo and a Batucata Musician
- Gabriel Porras as Emerson and Fernando
- Keith Wickham as Gordon (UK), Edward (UK), Henry (UK), Glynn, Den, Norman, Harold (UK), Bertie, Skarloey, Sir Topham Hatt, the Bird Watcher, the Grumpy Passenger, Passenger, the Great Railway Show Judge, a Child (US/UK), Some Children (UK), some Passengers, and some Workman
- Kerry Shale as Gordon (US), Henry (US), Diesel (UK/US), Harold (US), Kevin (US), Max (US), and the Troublesome Trucks
- Teresa Gallagher as Emily (UK), Annie and Clarabel, Belle, The Lady in Yellow Dress and Hat, The Teacher, Albert's Wife, The Lady in Blue Dress, Some Children, School Girl with two curly ponytails, The Ginger Haired Boy, Brenda, and The Sodor Rangers (US/UK)
- Jules de Jongh as Emily (US), Some Children (US), and Caitlin (UK/US)
- William Hope as Edward (US) and Toby (US)
- Rob Rackstraw as James (UK/US), Toby (UK), Stanley, Owen, the Man with Green Waistcoat and Grey Hair, The Crown Thief 2 (US/UK), a Passenger (UK/US), Monty (US), and the Troublesome Trucks
- Glenn Wrage as Cranky (US)
- David Bedella as Victor (UK/US)
- Ian McCue as The Crown Thief 1 (UK/US)
- Tim Bain as Aiden, Madeleine's Father (UK/US), some Passengers (US/UK), and some Workmen (UK/US)
- Christopher Ragland as Percy (US), a Passenger, and the Troublesome Trucks
- Tina Desai as Ashima and The Indian Fashion Designer (UK/US)
- Steve Kynman as Duck, Paxton, Dart, Peter Sam, and a Child (US)
- Nigel Pilkington as Percy (UK)
- Tom Stourton as Terence and Alfie
- Colin McFarlane as Bulgy
- Bob Golding as Sidney
- Tim Whitnall as Oliver and Monty (UK)
- Miranda Raison as Millie
- Shane Jacobson as Shane
- Sheena Bhattessa as Noor Jehan and Charubala
- Sanjeev Bhaskar as Shankar
- Chipo Chung as Hong-Mei
- Genevieve McCarthy as Aubrey
- Rachael Miller as Rebecca
- Harriet Kershaw as Jenny Packard and Darcy
- Yvonne Grundy as Nia
- Matt Wilkinson as Cranky (UK), Kevin (UK) and a Workman
- David Menkin as Jack (US) and Porter (US)
- Siu-see Hung as An An and the Chinese Women
- Windson Liong as Yin-Long and the Chinese Men
- Dan Li as Yong Bao
- Nikhil Parnar as Rajiv, the Indian Friendly Stationmaster, the Indian Grumpy Stationmaster, and the Indian Troublesome Trucks
- Flaminia Cinque as Ester and Dam Bella
- Anna Francolini as Gina, some Italian Children, and some Italian Passengers
- Montserrat Lombard as Mia and some Italian Passengers
- Antonio Magro as Stefano, the Italian Stationmaster, and some Italian Workmen
- Vincenzo Nicoli as Lorenzo, Beppe, an Italian Workman, and some Italian Passengers

== Episodes ==
| No. overall | No. in series | Title | Directed by | Written by | Original release date | TV Order |
|---|---|---|---|---|---|---|
| 539 | 1 | "Free the Roads" | Dianna Basso | Michael White | 2 September 2019 | 50a |
Bulgy wishes for buses to take the passengers instead of a train and gets his wish after accidentally tainting a water tower with soil. But after Thomas and the other friends get ill, Bulgy soon learns that he and Bertie need a lot more help to handle the work.
| 540 | 2 | "Crowning Around" | Dianna Basso | Camille Ucan & Rose Johnson | 3 September 2019 | 50b |
When Rajiv loses his crown, he thinks that no one, including the birds, the tigers, and the Troublesome Trucks, would no longer worship him and leaves Thomas, Ashima, and Shankar to do his jobs as well as their own. but Rajiv soon learns that he can be useful with or without his crown when he saves Shankar from a runaway Noor Jehan.
| 541 | 3 | "Chucklesome Trucks" | Dianna Basso | Davey Moore | 4 September 2019 | 51a |
Rebecca defies expectations when she works with the Troublesome Trucks to take to Vicarstown and has a very amusing day, much to Thomas, James, and Percy's surprise, as well for the Troublesome Trucks as they become surprised when Rebecca plays along with their jokes.
| 542 | 4 | "The Other Big Engine" | Dianna Basso | Davey Moore | 5 September 2019 | 51b |
Thomas meets another big blue electric engine in Brazil named Gustavo that reminds him of Gordon.
| 543 | 5 | "Heart of Gold" | Dianna Basso | Michael White | 6 September 2019 | 52a |
While Toby fills in for Stephen at Ulfstead Castle, he is insulted by Diesel and the passengers for how he looks, despite Glynn and Millie trying to cheer him up. But when two thieves steal King Godred's Crown, Toby gives chase and foils their escape plan winning the people over.
| 544 | 6 | "Batucada" | Dianna Basso | Davey Moore | 9 September 2019 | 52b |
After hearing from Gabriela and Cassia about Batucada and being invited by some musicians to the carnival, Thomas finds a way to take part in the Brazilian carnival music.
| 545 | 7 | "Gordon Gets the Giggles" | Dianna Basso | Becky Overton | 10 September 2019 | 53a |
Gordon becomes worried when he gets a serious case of the giggles after Rebecca gets covered with honey and vegetables.
| 546 | 8 | "Thomas Makes a Mistake" | Dianna Basso | Camille Ucan & Rose Johnson | 11 September 2019 | 53b |
Thomas causes confusion and delay by not seeking help from Charubala when he makes a mistake by leaving his delivery of silks at the wrong station.
| 547 | 9 | "Diesel Do Right" | Dianna Basso | Davey Moore | 12 September 2019 | 54a |
Diesel plays a trick on Rebecca to try to get Den, Dart, Norman, Sidney, and Paxton in trouble for a change.
| 548 | 10 | "Grudge Match" | Dianna Basso | Davey Moore | 13 September 2019 | 54b |
Raul wants to beat Thomas in a game as revenge for losing against him at the Great Railway Show on the Mainland, but his competitive nature soon gets him into trouble.
| 549 | 11 | "Steam Team to the Rescue" | Joey So | Davey Moore | 19 October 2019 | 55 |
When the diesels are out of action as the shed doors are shut tight, the Steam Team, including Edward, Henry, Rosie, and Stanley, have to pitch in to do the diesels' work as well as their own to take passengers along and shunt the Troublesome Trucks. Soon, Thomas has the Steam Team help at the Docks to help Cranky, Carly and Big Mickey with the crate load and rescue Percy, who has been buried in crates.
| 550 | 12 | "Panicky Percy" | Dianna Basso | Camille Ucan & Rose Johnson | 16 December 2019 | 56a |
Percy starts to cause confusion and delay by panicking over nothing as he thinks Thomas had an accident from an avalanche.
| 551 | 13 | "All Tracks Lead to Rome" | Joey So & Dianna Basso | Becky Overton | 21 December 2019 (Note: This episode was first released on the Digs and Discoveries DVD on October 7, 2019.) | 57 |
Thomas discovers that he doesn't know as much as he thinks he does while working in Italy with Gina and meeting new friends like Ester the excavator and Mia. He also learns the intriguing tale of the legendary Lost Engine by Stefano and runs into trouble on an old, abandoned line while trying to take some cargo to the museum not knowing the way.
| 552 | 14 | "Mines of Mystery" | Joey So | Becky Overton | 22 December 2019 | 58 |
When Jack and the Sodor Construction crew arrive in Italy, including a new buldozer named Brenda, Thomas is jealous of their amazing discoveries and wants to impress his friends by finding an amazing discovery. Then, an accident leads Thomas to making the biggest discovery of all, a steam engine named Lorenzo and his coach named Beppe. Thomas's wish has finally been granted, although not in the way he had expected.
| 553 | 15 | "Laid Back Shane" | Dianna Basso | Camille Ucan & Rose Johnson | 4 May 2020 (Note: This episode was first released on the Steam Team to the Rescue DVD on January 13, 2020.) | 56b |
Shane was having too much fun until he got stranded in the desert with Aurbry and Aiden.
| 554 | 16 | "Rangers on the Rails" | Dianna Basso | Davey Moore | 5 May 2020 | 59a |
Emily takes the Sodor Rangers to the campgrounds at Callan Castle for Nia, but ended up derailed in the progress.
| 555 | 17 | "Wish You Were Here" | Dianna Basso | Camille Ucan & Rose Johnson | 6 May 2020 | 59b |
Thomas misses his friend Percy while working on the Chinese Railway, so Yong Bao and Hong-Mei try to cheer him up with the annual dragon boat race.
| 556 | 18 | "Out of Site" | Dianna Basso | Michael White | 7 May 2020 | 60a |
Brenda learns it is important to work as a team instead for caring about her own jobs as he thinks Max and Monty were dumping stone on her smooth path.
| 557 | 19 | "First Day on Sodor!" | Dianna Basso | Becky Overton | 11 May 2020 | 60b |
Darcy makes some mistakes on her first day, but as Alfie and Oliver fail to clear rocks to make a tunnel for the new road, she soon makes up for it when everyone sees what see can really do.
| 558 | 20 | "Lorenzo's Solo" | Dianna Basso | Becky Overton | 12 May 2020 | 61a |
When overhearing from Thomas that Gina is to take Dame Bella Canto to a concert in Rome, Lorenzo gives Beppe to Gina to take the Orchestra while he takes a bigger coach so he can take Dame Bella Canto to the concert, but he was lost without Beppe and gets stranded in a scrapyard in the woods.
| 559 | 21 | "Deep Trouble" | Dianna Basso | Michael White | 13 May 2020 | 61b |
As Miss Jenny's construction crew, Jack and the Pack, work on a construction site at the Led Mines to put in a visitors' park, Max and Monty's antics get them into trouble.
| 560 | 22 | "Too Loud, Thomas!" | Dianna Basso | Becky Overton | 14 May 2020 | 62a |
Thomas wants to perform opera like Lorenzo and Beppe, but finds it a lot more difficult than he first thought. Unfortunately, his attempts hurt Ester's hearing, the cows to run away, demolish an old building, and accidentally lead to him losing his voice just as Mia tells him that he has a message to deliver to Stefano.
| 561 | 23 | "Diesel Glows Away" | Dianna Basso | Davey Moore | 15 May 2020 (Note: This episode was first released on The Royal Engine DVD on May 4, 2020.) | 62b |
When Diesel hides from the other engines, his plans backfire and he gets a surprise on Sodor from Nia and Paxton.
