= Thomas & Friends series 19 =

Season of television series

Thomas & Friends
- Series 19
- Official cover art for the series 19 DVD
- No. of episodes: 26

Release
- Original network: Channel 5
- Original release: 21 September 2015 – 10 March 2017

Series chronology
- ← Previous; Series 18 Next → Series 20

Thomas & Friends is a children's television series about the engines and other characters on the railways of the Island of Sodor, and is based on The Railway Series books written by Wilbert Awdry.

This article lists and details episodes from the nineteenth series of the show, which was first broadcast in 2015. There were 26 episodes in the series, preceded by Thomas & Friends: Sodor's Legend of the Lost Treasure. The series is narrated by Mark Moraghan, for both the UK and US audiences.

== Episodes ==
No. overall	No. in series	UK title (top) US title (bottom)	Directed by	Written by	Original release date	Official No.
441	1	"Who's Geoffrey?"	Don Spencer	Lee Pressman	21 September 2015	1901
Thomas gets himself into trouble, by bumping the Troublesome Trucks into Salty and spilled a crate of bouncy balls, he blames an imaginary engine named Geoffrey. But when people and other engines around the island start asking to meet him, Sir Topham Hatt also wants to meet the so-called Geoffrey. Thomas flees backwards with Annie and Clarabel, and stops in Henry's Tunnel, pretending Geoffrey is in there with him and imitates him. Once Spencer stops in the tunnel, he states that there are no other engine in there.
442	2	"The Truth About Toby"	Don Spencer	Davey Moore	22 September 2015	1904
A rumour about Toby being scrapped circulates, but the truth is that Toby has only run out of coal at the scrapyard. Toby and Reg try everything they can to get help, but no engines seem to take notice. Eventually, Emily brings Henrietta to the scrapyard, and brings some coal for Toby. In the end, Sir Topham Hatt announces that Toby is not going to be scrapped, and Thomas eventually admits that he started the entire confusion. Toby still minds himself of his own broken side plates as he puffs out of Knapford yard.
443	3	"Lost Property"	Don Spencer	Helen Farrall	23 September 2015	1905
Some Railway Inspectors come to Sodor and one loses his watch, during Thomas' inspection. It was first bumpy during that trip, and some school children where making noise onboard. Later when Thomas arrives back at Knapford, after completing all his jobs, the stationmaster found the inspectors golden watch. Thomas hurries to catch up to the inspectors, which are on Gordon's express. Eventually Gordon stops, and Thomas' driver gives back the watch to the inspector that lost it. The inspectors give a good rating on Thomas and Annie & Clarabel, before announcing that the railway will get a good report. The inspectors travel back to the Mainland with Gordon, but it became a bumpy start for Gordon as well. Meanwhile, Sir Topham Hatt enjoys a ping-pong game again, until he hurts himself in the eye.
444	4	"Henry Spots Trouble"	Don Spencer	Davey Moore	24 September 2015	1906
Henry believes that engines can get chickenpox, and he first spots Thomas having actually mud in his face, and then he spots Paxton with exhaust in his face from Diesel, and then spots Gordon with spots in his face which is actually paint; but after encountering Gordon, he flees backwards, nearly colliding with James and his passenger train. Eventually he stops at the same station he started at, and Thomas, Gordon and Winston with Sir Topham Hatt and his grandchildren, arrive. Sir Topham Hatt explains that only people can get chickenpox, and that they mostly get it when they are young. Later, Henry meets Paxton again, and he jokes about diesels getting measles, but says it was a joke. Henry says he also joked with his own reaction, and they try to go their separate ways in the end. Note: This episode was banned in Australia due to the episode's negative reception about chickenpox.
445	5	"A Cranky Christmas"	Don Spencer	Mark Huckerby & Nick Ostler	4 January 2016	1902
Cranky hides a special crate that is supposed to be delivered by Thomas to the Tidmouth Town Square, thinking he broke it, but Thomas is not the only one who is concerned about the crate, Sir Topham Hatt is also concerned. Cranky tries to hide the crate, and claims he hasn’t seen it yet. Salty later spots it and the special crate is loaded onto Thomas’ flatbed truck, and he takes it to the Town Square. He skids at the station, but is saved by Edward’s sand from his sandbox. It turns out that the special, was an icing rink and it is set up. Thomas suggests that Sir Topham should have his own sandbox. Later at Brendam Docks, the engines sing “We Wish You A Merry Christmas” and ends with saying “A Cranky New Year”.
446	6	"Snow Place Like Home"	Don Spencer	Lee Pressman	5 January 2016	1903
There is heavy snow on the Island of Sodor, and at the Steamworks Kevin says he likes the snow, but Victor says he hates it and never would take a wheel out in the icy cold weather, but when Kevin takes a journey out in the snow, he gets himself stuck beside the Steamworks, and is later nearly covered in snow. Victor goes out to look for him, and Thomas eventually finds him. Victor returns, and they all get about their day.
447	7	"The Beast of Sodor"	Don Spencer	Becky Overton	6 January 2016	1909
One night at Tidmouth Sheds, Spencer tells a tale of the Abominable Snowman and how he saved the Duke and Duchess of Boxford from it. This gives Henry a fright. The following day, Sir Topham Hatt drives his car to get to his mother after giving Henry and Spencer the task of shunting trucks. Sir Topham Hatt gets stuck in a traffic jam and decides to take a shortcut. But when his car gets stuck, he struggles to get himself out. Eventually he is covered in so much snow when he reaches the railway that he scares both Henry and Spencer. Eventually Sir Topham Hatt reveals himself and all the engines know that Henry was brave that day.
448	8	"Toad and the Whale"	Don Spencer	Helen Farrall	14 March 2016	1907
Toad spots a stranded whale on the beach and he wants to rescue it, but he knows he can't do it all by himself, so he gets help from the Sodor Search and Rescue Centre, but when they can't find the right way to rescue it on, they form another way of doing it.
449	9	"Very Important Sheep"	Don Spencer	Helen Farrall	15 March 2016	1908
Percy transports some of Farmer McColl's sheep, but suddenly there's a hole in the back of the cattle van and the sheep escapes out on the track. Percy gets help from Thomas, along with Annie and Clarabel, and together they collect all the very important sheep and bring them to Farmer McColl at Maithwaite.
450	10	"Salty All at Sea"	Don Spencer	Lee Pressman	16 March 2016	1910
Salty usually tells every engine of his own made up stories, but when Sir Topham Hatt wants him to work on the Mainland, Salty becomes unsure about that, and tries everything in his might to not be sent to the Mainland by taking the Troublesome Trucks to Welsworth Station and doing Thomas' passenger run to Knapford. Every other engine reassures him that everything is going to be okay, and eventually Salty gives himself up and goes to the Mainland.
451	11	"Den & Dart"	Dianna Basso & Don Spencer	Davey Moore	17 March 2016	1913
Den and Dart don't like working apart from each other, but when Mavis has an accident with the Troublesome Trucks, and is sent to the Dieselworks with Thomas to be repaired again, Den is sent to take her place at Ffarquhar Quarry, but Den has a hard time with the Troublesome Trucks who were giving him a hard time and teasing him somehow. Toby and Henrietta had to help out poor Den with the Troublesome Trucks while Mavis helps Dart out with his problem of missing Den.
452	12	"Helping Hiro"	Don Spencer	Mark Huckerby & Nick Ostler	18 March 2016	1914
One day when Thomas has a delivery of metal pipes, Hiro puffs by his side, but when Thomas goes too fast down a hill, he nearly loses balance, but his flatbeds do lose balance, and pipes fall over Hiro's tracks, and he derails and lands on his side. Rocky soon comes to the rescue, but Hiro can't move his wheels normally, and Thomas helps him to the Steamworks, but Thomas feels like that it's everything his own fault.
453	13	"Slow Stephen"	Don Spencer	Helen Farrall	11 July 2016 (Note: This episode was first released on the Start Your Engines! DVD on 14 March 2016.)	1915
Stephen is used to being called a slow engine, and that for the most from Gordon, but one day, while crossing the Sodor Suspension Bridge, he hears a weird noise. He just concludes that he might be thinking of Gordon, that makes him dizzy. Another day, he doesn't hear the weird noise, and crosses the Suspension Bridge happily. But later that day, a screw becomes lose, and the tracks slowly give way. Stephen manages to stop Thomas in time, but Annie and Clarabel won't risk Thomas crossing the bridge, so Stephen crosses instead. While crossing the bridge, he derails a bit, but manages to get back on track. His crew wave a red flag to stop Gordon, and Gordon stops just in time, before the bridge collapses in front of their eyes. Thomas and Stephen are greeted heroes, and Gordon thanks Stephen for saving him and his passengers. This makes Stephen more popular, and brings more tourists to the Island of Sodor.
454	14	"Two Wheels Good"	Don Spencer	Lee Pressman	12 July 2016	1916
Spencer is going to take the Duke and Duchess of Boxford to Callan Castle to have a speech. Then Spencer breaks down and Thomas takes the Duke and Duchess, but Thomas nearly crashes into a fallen tree and Bertie is tasked with taking the Duke and Duchess to Callan Castle then he gets a flat tire and Harold saves the day.
455	15	"Reds vs Blues"	Don Spencer	Davey Moore	13 July 2016	1917
The Sodor United football team are going to have a match against Barrow and Sir Topham Hatt is the referee. Thomas and James are supposed to work together by collecting passengers for the match but end up racing each other instead. James forgets the Barrow football team at Brendam Docks and Thomas forgets to pick up the Fat Controller. Only when James and Thomas puff up to the football pitch entrance do they see only the Sodor United team there. Percy arrives with the Barrow team and Sir Topham Hatt, who explains to Thomas and James about yellow and red cards in football. He also adds that they mustn't compete against one another any more, and just work together after the match. Finally the match gets going and suddenly the ball lands in Thomas' funnel. He boosts out steam and the ball lands in a goal in the end.
456	16	"Best Engine Ever"	Dianna Basso, Don Spencer & David Stoten	Andrew Brenner	14 July 2016	1918
Emily sometimes wishes she was as special as Caitlin. She even thinks of herself being streamlined, but Victor reassures her that Caitlin is just a normal engine under herself. Emily still wants to be as special as Caitlin no matter what the other engines say. But one day, she delivers a delivery to Ulfstead Castle, and there she meets Caitlin, who is having a check on herself by her driver. Emily goes back down again from the castle, but all the sudden she hears Caitlin calling for help; and she is thundering at high speed down the hill right behind Emily with broken brakes, so she cannot stop herself. Emily takes action, and decides to slow down her own speed. Eventually, she stops Caitlin at the bottom of the hill, and Caitlin says that she is her hero. Emily then helps Caitlin to the Steamworks, and this time it was her that needed to help Caitlin, then Caitlin helping her. They laugh together after saying things about the differences between the 2.
457	17	"The Little Engine Who Raced Ahead"	Dianna Basso, Don Spencer & David Stoten	Andrew Brenner	15 July 2016	1919
Thomas is shunting trucks in Knapford yard, when he spots something odd. It later appears that what he saw was the new diesel boxcab on Sodor, by the name Philip. Philip is a keen but curious kind of engine. The bigger engines find him a bit annoying and refer to him as a show off. One day, Philip bumps into Gordon, and asks him if he wants to race. Gordon says no, and continues to get water from the water tower. Later, Gordon is pulling the express when Philip asks Thomas where he is. Thomas responds by saying he is pulling the express, but might have time later. When Gordon is about to go to rest, Philip asks him for a race. As Gordon says go away, Philip mistakes it for meaning go, as to start the race, and he races away. In the shed at night, he tells the other engines that he beat Gordon. The other engines laugh, but Gordon is determined to prove Philip tomorrow how fast he is, with a lot of laughter.
458	18	"Philip to the Rescue"	Dianna Basso, Don Spencer & David Stoten	Andrew Brenner	18 July 2016	1920
James pulls a long line of trucks one day to show Philip (the new boxcar diesel) how strong he can be himself, but the line of trucks James is pulling is very heavy and has a big load on itself, and when he goes up a hill, it becomes more and more difficult for himself, but when he finds it difficult to stop when he finally goes down the hill, he starts to lose balance and derails off the tracks, and collides with the wall of a bridge and hangs dangling while calling for help. Luckily, Philip is nearby and manages to prevent James from falling down on the tracks below. James' driver goes to call for help, and soon Percy arrives with Rocky. Sir Topham Hatt points out that James was a show off himself. While at Tidmouth Sheds the following night, Philip tells everyone about how he saved James, and states how strong he can be, but Edward points out that he is a show off himself by saying so. Gordon murmurs to himself that they should find Philip his own shed, but nobody listens, because they're all busy laughing at Philip's final statement.
459–460	19–20	"Diesel's Ghostly Christmas"	Don Spencer & Dianna Basso	Becky Overton	26 December 2016 (Note: This episode was first released on the Thomas's Christmas Carol DVD on 7 November 2016.)	1911/1912
Part 1: Thomas is due to take a group of singers to a rehearsal. When Sir Topham Hatt arrives, he says he needs to be at the docks, but has a broken ankle and cannot drive. Thomas asks Diesel in the yard if he could help, but Diesel says he's "busy" and oils away. Thomas asks Emily instead, who is happy to help. At Brendam Docks, Cranky is about to lay down a Christmas tree on a flatbed and orders Diesel to push it under the down-coming tree, but Diesel only oils away. Salty finally arrives, but the tree lands on him instead. Paxton is later on route to Ulfstead Castle with the tree, until he derails. After Diesel passes by, Thomas arrives and asks if it was him, witch Paxton confirms. (Note: Thomas' plan is based on the book A Christmas Carol by Charles Dickens) Later, Emily is pretending to be "E-Marley's Ghost" at the Dieselworks. She tells Diesel to stop being an unhelpful engine. Diesel later runs away. At the docks, he doesn't find Sir Topham Hatt, but the "Ghost of Christmas Past" is on a ship, and tells Diesel about his past mistakes. Diesel eventually gets more scared and leaves, while Salty and Cranky laugh after he has left. Part 2: Diesel meets two more ghostly engines, the "Ghost of Christmas Present" who first tells him that he should be out enjoying extra jobs for Christmas, but Diesel only snorts at it. After a while, Diesel reverses backwards away from the Ghost's location, and derails in the same location where Paxton had derailed earlier. Thomas later passes by, but declines to help Diesel. Thomas gets covered in rubbish at Whiff's Waste Dump, which is part of his plan to be the next ghost. The "Ghost of Christmas Future" later arrives where Diesel is, and tells him what will happen if he doesn't help others. After finishing it off, the Ghost leaves. Thomas later arrives with Rocky to help Diesel, and he also volunteers to take Rocky back to the Search and Rescue Centre. The Christmas party has started at Ulfstead Castle, and Diesel wishes the other engines a Merry Christmas.
461	21	"Rocky Rescue"	Dianna Basso	Davey Moore	6 March 2017 (Note: This episode was first released on the Full Steam to the Rescue! DVD on 24 October 2016.)	1921
Henry has derailed off the tracks down from Ulfstead Castle to the junction near Ulfstead Mine. Thomas rushes to the Sodor Search and Rescue Center, but to the other rescue vehicles disappointment it is Rocky who is needed. Thomas arrives to Henry's site with Rocky, and he places him back on the rails again, but when a couple of workmen tries to get a large rock off the tracks, it suddenly bumps into Rocky and sends him flying down the tracks; until he derails at a junction. Thomas rushes back to the Sodor Search & Rescue Center, where he alerts the other rescue vehicles; and they set off to rescue Rocky. After realizing that neither one of them can help Rocky, he tells them that they need to work together.
462	22	"Thomas the Babysitter"	Dianna Basso	Helen Farrall	6 March 2017	1922
Thomas must deal with a noisy baby on his train, which always seems to cry when his train stops at every station. He soon learns he can't prevent the problem because he always needs to stop at every station. Thomas later speaks to Sir Topham Hatt and asks him if he can accept that Thomas can take his train on a non-stop route for the mother and the baby only. Sir Topham Hatt agrees and after going through the Ffarquhar to Knapford route and back again, both the mother and the baby have fallen asleep. Back at Knapford, a workman named Albert comes over and thanks Thomas for looking after his wife and baby. Albert and his wife soon figure out a name for their baby, which apparently is Thomas.
463	23	"The Other Side of the Mountain"	Dianna Basso	Andrew Brenner	7 March 2017	1923
Thomas wants to find out what is on the other side of a mountain on his branch line, when Bertie tells him about the experience and sights he sees on that side. This makes Thomas intrigued, and he wants to see for himself; but knows he can't do it. One day when he has to deliver a goods train, he rushes by Bertie who desperately tries to explain the truth after their argument the day before. Thomas suddenly derails by missing a signal and the Troublesome Trucks pushing him and goes so far as the other side through a forest. When Butch is tasked to take him back by road, Thomas is more disappointed when he can't see any of the sights that Bertie was talking about. Then he understands what Bertie meant when he sees a poster, of a jungle with a river and a rainbow, and Butch and Thomas laughs as they continue back to the other side, and at the Steamworks, he apologizes to Bertie for misunderstanding him.
464	24	"No Help at All"	Dianna Basso	Andrew Brenner	8 March 2017	1924
Bill and Ben say that Timothy is no help at all at the clay pits so they can have some fun. Therefore they suggest to Sir Topham Hatt to send Timothy to the docks to help. Sir Topham Hatt agrees, and Timothy later helps Porter and Cranky out at the docks. They work excellently together as a team; until the Fat Controller arrives and tells it was Bill and Ben's idea to send him to the docks. There is chaos at China Clay Pits; where the twin engines can't agree on who is going to do what. Sir Topham Hatt is cross with the twins, but later accepts other engines to work and help out; which includes Timothy, Porter, and Salty. In no time the Clay Pits were cleaned up from the mess of the trucks.
465	25	"Goodbye Fat Controller"	Dianna Basso	Teleplay by : Andrew Brenner; Story by : Robin Gay	9 March 2017	1925
465	25	"Goodbye Sir Topham Hatt"	Dianna Basso	Teleplay by : Andrew Brenner; Story by : Robin Gay	9 March 2017	1925
Percy overhears some workmen talking and thinks Sir Topham Hatt is leaving Sodor. Percy then starts telling the other engines about it, and everyone is convinced that he really is leaving the Island. To convince him to stay, they do everything as best as they can, by being earlier than usual and being on time for every job the engines got. As much Sir Topham Hatt is slightly in doubt he accepts what his engines are doing. The day comes when Percy spots the workmen removing items from Sir Topham Hatt's office. He then tells the other engines and they decide to go on strike. As confusion and delay escalate, Sir Topham Hatt arrives at Tidmouth Sheds where he reassures the engines that he is not leaving Sodor. It turns out that his office is just getting redecorated and that he will be working in a temporary office instead, which in his case is a shed.
466	26	"Wild Water Rescue"	Don Spencer	Becky Overton	10 March 2017	1926
Diesel gets jealous of Percy when he gets to deliver the Mayor to the Sodor Search and Rescue center. So he makes a plan to be able to deliver the Mayor of Sodor himself. He first tricks Percy by going to an old quarry, where Percy gets stuck in some flooded tracks and his fire dies out. Diesel in the meantime picks up the Mayor and Sir Topham Hatt making his excuse that Percy has broken down. But Diesel is more disappointed when he isn’t allowed to be in the photo of the rescue engines for the newspaper front pages. He tries to find Percy after that; and tries to rescue him, but only for him as well to get stuck. Harold then flies over; followed by the other ground rescue vehicles that has come to their aid. Sir Topham Hatt and Percy later laugh as Diesel got to be on the newspaper front pages after all.
