= La Soirée =

Official logo of LA SOIRÉE

La Soirée is a cabaret/variety show presented by Brett Haylock, Mark Rubinstein and Mick Perrin that debuted in London in October 2010 to rave reviews. The show features a number of artists who previously appeared in La Clique, a variety show co-created by Brett Haylock. Haylock was also the Creative Producer of La Clique. La Soirée is traditionally presented with a small, circular red stage as its centerpiece, with the audience sitting in rows surrounding the stage. The show features a rotating cast of approximately 25 artists, with the acts varying from night to night.

The cast of La Soirée′s first season in London included previous La Clique artists Captain Frodo, David O'Mer, The English Gents and Miss Behave. The cast also included returning La Clique artists Ursula Martinez, Camille O'Sullivan, Meow Meow, Cabaret Decadanse, Le Gateau Chocolat, Marawa and Jess Love, as well as new cast member Mooky Cornish. The season took place in the South Bank Big Top tent on London's South Bank, behind the Royal National Theatre.

Some of the cast of La Soirée first performed together as La Clique in 2004 at The Edinburgh Festival Fringe. Since then, La Clique has performed in several cities, including London, New York (as "Absinthe: Les Artistes de La Clique"), Paris, Sydney, Stockholm and Dublin. In 2009, La Clique won a Laurence Olivier Award for Best Entertainment for their 2008 London season hosted by Haylock. Since its inaugural season in London at the South Bank, La Soirée has completed seasons in Australia, Sweden, Denmark and Germany, and returned to London for another Christmas season at The Roundhouse. La Soirée has also announced seasons in Montreal, Canada; Chicago, USA; and an extensive Australian tour that reached Darwin, Brisbane, Melbourne, Sydney and Adelaide in 2012 and 2013. In September 2013, it was announced that La Soirée would be opening a season at the Union Square Theatre in New York City, commencing 29 October 2013, for which it won an Off Broadway Alliance Award in the category of Best Unique Theatrical Experience. In May 2014, La Soirée made its South American debut in Buenos Aires, Argentina, performing in an acclaimed season at the Buenos Aires Polo Circo.

== Seasons ==
Year	Month	Location	Venue
2010-2011	October–February	London, United Kingdom	South Bank Big Top
2011	March	Umeå, Sweden	Idunteatern
2011	March–April	Stockholm, Sweden	Tyrol, Gröna Lund
2011	October	Aalborg, Denmark	Skråen i Nordkraft
2011-2012	November–January	London, United Kingdom	The Roundhouse
2012	January–March	Sydney, Australia	Sydney Opera House
2012	March	Adelaide, Australia	Garden of Unearthly Delights
2012	May–June	Hamburg, Germany	Fliegende Bauten Hamburg
2012	July	Montreal, Canada	L'Olympia
2012	July–August	Chicago, USA	The RiverFront Theatre
2012	August	Darwin, Australia	The Lighthouse, Festival Park
2012	September	Brisbane, Australia	The Courier-Mail Spiegeltent, South Bank
2012	October–November	Melbourne, Australia	Forum Theatre
2013	January–March	Sydney, Australia	Sydney Opera House
2013	March	Adelaide, Australia	Garden of Unearthly Delights
2013	August–September	Darwin, Australia	Darwin Entertainment Centre
2013	September	Brisbane, Australia	The Spiegeltent, South Bank
2013-2014	October–May	New York City, USA	Union Square Theatre
2014	January–March	Sydney, Australia	Sydney Opera House
2014	March	Hobart, Australia	Spiegeltent Hobart
2014	May	Buenos Aires, Argentina	Buenos Aires Polo Circo
2014	August-September	Umeå, Sweden	Spiegeltent
2014	September	Halmstad, Sweden	Stationsparken
2014	September-October	Stockholm, Sweden	Tyrol, Gröna Lund
2014	October	Lund, Sweden	Lunds Stadshall
2014-2015	November-January	London, United Kingdom	La Soirée Spiegeltent, South Bank
2015	January-March	Perth, Australia	Palais des Glaces Spiegeltent
2015	March	Adelaide, Australia	Garden of Unearthly Delights
2015	March	Hobart, Australia	Spiegeltent Hobart
2015	May	Brisbane, Australia	Queensland Performing Arts Centre
2015	May-June	Darwin, Australia	Darwin Entertainment Centre
2015	June	Glastonbury Festival, United Kingdom	Circus Big Top
2015	August	Aalborg, Denmark	Paradiso Spiegeltent, Skråen i Nordkraft
2015	August-September	Aarhus, Denmark	Hermans Theatre, Tivoli Friheden
2015	September	Hong Kong	Lyric Theatre, The Hong Kong Academy for Performing Arts
2015	September	Manila, Philippines	The Theatre at Solaire Resort & Casino
2015-2016	October-January	London, United Kingdom	La Soirée Spiegeltent, South Bank
2016	January-March	Perth, Australia	La Soirée Spiegeltent, Perth Cultural Centre
2016	August	Aalborg, Denmark	Spiegeltent, Skråen i Nordkraft
2016-2017	November-January	London, United Kingdom	La Soirée Spiegeltent, Leicester Square
2017	January-February	Perth, Australia	Edith Spiegeltent, Cathedral Square, Perth
2017	March	Auckland, New Zealand	Spiegeltent at Festival Garden, Aotea Square
2017	May	Port Douglas, Australia	Wonderland Spiegeltent, Port Douglas Carnivale
2017	August	Aalborg, Denmark	Spiegeltent, Skråen i Nordkraft

=== London, United Kingdom; October 2010 – February 2011 ===
La Soirée's inaugural season debuted in London at the South Bank Big Top in October 2010. The cast included previous La Clique artists Captain Frodo, David O'Mer, The English Gents, Miss Behave, Ursula Martinez, Camille O'Sullivan, Cabaret Decadanse, Le Gateau Chocolat, Marawa, Jess Love, Bret Pfister, Hugo Desmarais and Meow Meow, as well as new cast member Mooky Cornish.

In November 2010, the producers of La Soirée announced that its London run was extended to 27 February 2011 due to phenomenal demand. The original ending date for the season was 30 January 2011.

=== Umeå and Stockholm, Sweden; March – April 2011 ===
After a successful Swedish season as La Clique in 2010, it was announced that La Soirée was returning to Umeå's Idunteatern and Stockholm's Gröna Lund for a six-week season. The cast included Ursula Martinez, Captain Frodo, The English Gents, David O'Mer, Cabaret Decadanse, The Skating Willers, Amy G, Yulia Pykhtina and Le Gateau Chocolat, all of whom have appeared in previous seasons of La Clique or La Soirée.

=== Aalborg, Denmark; October 2011 ===
After performing for two consecutive years at the Aarhus Festuge in Aarhus, Denmark as La Clique, La Soirée returned to Denmark, playing at the Skråen i Nordkraft venue as part of the Aalborg Fringe Festival. The cast included previous La Clique artists Yulia Pykhtina, The English Gents, Hugo Desmarais, Captain Frodo, Amy G, Susannah Martinez, David O’Mer and Le Gateau Chocolat, as well as new cast members Chris & Iris.

=== London, United Kingdom; November 2011 – January 2012 ===
In early 2011, the producers of La Soirée announced that for the 2011 Christmas season, La Soirée would return to perform in The Roundhouse for a 10-week season. La Clique previously played at The Roundhouse during the 2009 Christmas season, where it broke box-office records for the fastest selling show in pre-opening sales, grossing over £500,000 in sales before its first performance. The cast for this London season included previous La Clique artists Yulia Pykhtina, The English Gents, Mooky, Le Gateau Chocolat, Katharine Arnold, Hugo Desmarais, Chris & Iris and Mario, Queen of the Circus. In addition, regular La Clique cast members The Skating Willers announced that after thirty years of performing together, this London season at The Roundhouse would be their last together. The cast also included artists Nate Cooper, Paul Capsis, Omar Cortes, Up & Over It and comedian David Armand, all of whom were performing in a La Soirée season for the first time.

In October 2011, London newspaper The Evening Standard shortlisted La Soirée for an Evening Standard Award in the category of Best Night Out at the Theatre, calling it "a joyous evening of the outrageous, bizarre and beautiful, as variety blended with cabaret and threw in some burlesque for good measure." La Soirée was nominated against long-running London West End productions Chicago, Les Misérables and Wicked.

In November 2011, La Soirée was also nominated in the first annual London Cabaret Awards, which celebrate the growing cabaret scene in London. La Soirée won in the category of Best One-Off Show.

=== Sydney, Australia; January – February 2012 ===
After having previously played as La Clique in Sydney as part of Sydney Festival, La Soirée’s producers announced that La Soirée would return to perform a season at the iconic Sydney Opera House. Due to overwhelming demand, the show ended up extending its season twice, running for an unprecedented 10 weeks at the Sydney Opera House. La Soirée’s Sydney cast included David O’Mer, Captain Frodo, The English Gents, Ursula Martinez, Jess Love, Mooky, Bret Pfister, Gerry Connolly, Yulia Pykhtina, Le Gateau Chocolat, Susannah Martinez and Mario, Queen of the Circus.

=== Adelaide, Australia; March 2012 ===
Following its Australian debut as La Soirée at the Sydney Opera House, the producers announced that the show would return to the Adelaide Fringe Festival in 2012, performing in The Garden of Unearthly Delights. The nine-show season was completely sold out. At the conclusion of the festival, La Soirée was awarded the BankSA Pick of the Fringe by the festival, an award given to the Fringe “experience” demonstrating overall excellence. La Soirée was also shortlisted for BankSA Best Cabaret Award. The cast of the Adelaide season included Mooky, David O’Mer, Captain Frodo, The English Gents, Susannah Martinez, Le Gateau Chocolat, Yulia Pykhtina and Mario, Queen of the Circus.

=== Hamburg, Germany; May – June 2012 ===
In May 2012, La Soirée made its German debut in Hamburg at the Fliegende Bauten Hamburg venue for a six-week season. The cast included Mario, Queen of the Circus, Amy G, Yulia Pykhtina, Mooky, Susannah Martinez, The English Gents, Captain Frodo, Miss Behave and David O’Mer.

== Critical reception ==
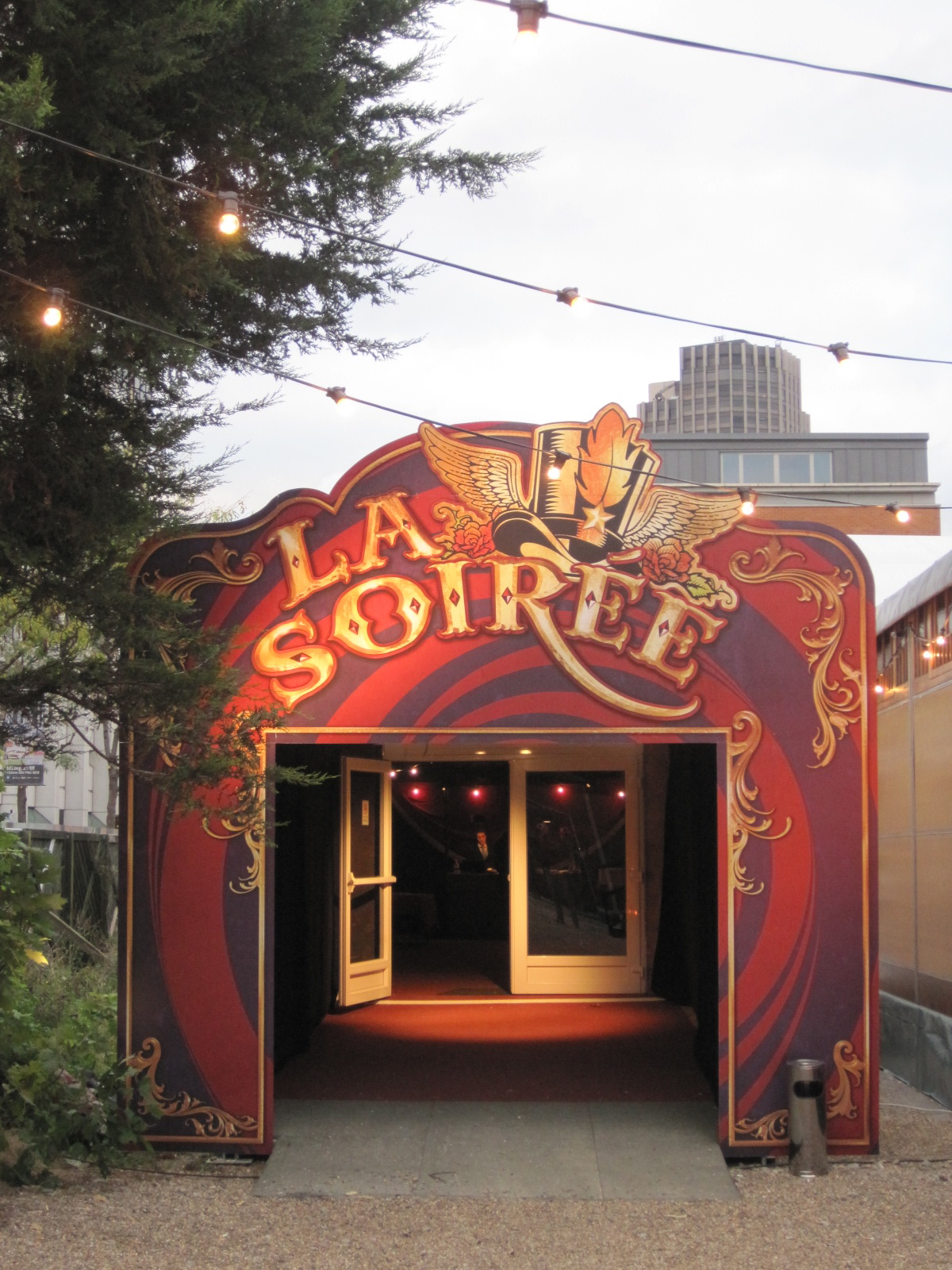
Entrance to LA SOIRÉE at the South Bank Big Top in London.

The 2010 London season of La Soirée opened to numerous strong reviews from theatre critics. Following its press night on 21 October 2010, La Soirée received four-star reviews from Time Out, The Guardian, The Daily Telegraph, The Independent, The Sunday Times, Financial Times, Evening Standard, Metro, Boyz and UK websites MusicOMH and Whatsonstage.com. The show received five-star reviews from the Sunday Express and Pink Paper. Positive reviews for La Soirée were also received from The Stage, Official London Theatre and the UK comedy website, Chortle.

Writing for the Sunday Express, Mark Shenton commented: "Christmas arrives earlier every year, it seems, but La Soirée, a rebranded but happily not repackaged version of the circus burlesque La Clique previously seen at Hippodrome, London and The Roundhouse, is the first show to engender all-year-round festive cheer." Caroline McGinn of Time Out rated La Soirée "Show of the Week" and said: "'La Clique'′s sequel, 'La Soirée', has the same winning formula plus a line-up that's the strongest yet" and is "something you won't find elsewhere in the mainstream: variety that's genuinely varied - and burlesque with balls." The Critics' Choice section of the same magazine noted "the freakishly talented folk from 'La Clique' are back in a plush new South Bank tent and the line up, with old acts doing new tricks, and some new faces, is better than ever."

In The Guardian, Brian Logan wrote: "Beautiful. Funny. Impossible. La Soirée's triumph is that there's not a single moment when one, two or all three of those terms don't apply" and described the show as "timeless and unpretentious, captivating and almost as light as air." Stu Hurford of Pink Paper wrote that "the whole evening offers a quirky sense of fun, which is the true genius of a show like La Soirée." In Boyz (magazine), Joseph Cattell commented: "Funny and surprisingly touching, La Soirée is not only testament to the breathtaking beauty and strength of the human body, but proof that freaks really do have all the fun. An unmissable evening." Evening Standard′s Fiona Mountford commented: "The exuberant international stars of last year's award-winning entertainment La Clique are not the sorts to be down in the dumps for long, which is why their sparkling new show, celebrating the ongoing revival of the variety/cabaret genre, is just the thing to combat the gloom." The Daily Telegraph′s Charles Spencer echoed this sentiment: "Mixing good humour and glamour with a thrilling frisson of danger, La Soirée offers a wonderfully warm and welcoming refuge from the cold, scary world outside."

Ian Shuttleworth of the Financial Times called La Soirée "the continuation of La Clique...as a return to this alternative cabaret show's roots" and stated that "shows such as La Soirée confirm that variety cabaret isn't dead yet, and that it would be a shame to lose it." David Jays of The Sunday Times commented that the show "generates enough cheer to survive the bleakest winter" and naming La Soirée "Theatre Pick of the Week", said "the team behind La Clique bring supreme talent to bear on madcap acts." Metro newspaper's Keith Watson said: "La Soirée is La Clique rebooted, with most of the top acts from last year's giddy marriage of acrobatics and burlesque giving their tricks a new twist. But even if you caught La Clique, you won't feel shortchanged." Writing for MusicOMH, Sam Smith stated: "La Soirée is essentially the new incarnation of La Clique, and retains some of the original production team, many of the original performers, and undoubtedly the same spirit of wacky, alternative and mesmerizing fun."

Upon its return to London in its second year at The Roundhouse, La Soirée again received strong to rave reviews from theatre critics. Five-star reviews were received from Time Out and the Sunday Express, while four-star reviews were given by The Guardian, The Daily Telegraph and the Evening Standard. Positive reviews for La Soirée were again received from The Stage and Chortle.

After its press night on 28 November 2011, Time Out's Abigail Lelliott rated La Soirée five stars, calling it "endearing and exhilarating, pure adrenalin-fuelled entertainment at its best. The perfect Christmas cracker" while pointing out that "the seamless production allows no time for you to pick your jaw up off the floor before the next act takes to the stage." In a glowing review, Mark Shenton of The Stage claimed that "this ever-morphing smorgasbord of cabaret delights is pure pleasure, achieving a scintillating combination of dash and daring, sexy and silly, and wicked and witty." The Daily Telegraph′s Charles Spencer praised the cast "as stuffed with good things as the richest of Christmas puddings" and declared "there isn't a dud act on the bill. For risqué humour and spectacular stunts, La Soiree remains the best ticket in town." The Evening Standard′s Bruce Dessau called La Soirée "a sexy, slapstick, eye-poppingly scary spectacular." Brian Logan of The Guardian again rewarded La Soirée with a four-star review, claiming that "as it returns for Christmas with a handful of new acts, there is no diminishing in the quality of the show that provided such a sassy, delinquent thrill on the South Bank last year" and that "the gasp factor is as lungbustingly high as ever." In comparing The Roundhouse season to the previous one at the South Bank, Chortle's Steve Bennett wrote that "the variety line-up offers a well-judged mix of old favourites and new delights, all remaining true to the burlesque ethos and so ensuring another decadently stylish and daringly entertaining night out."

Following its press night at the Sydney Opera House on 6 January 2012, La Soirée opened to rave reviews from the Australian press, receiving four-and-a-half star reviews from The Sunday Telegraph (Australia), and four-star reviews from Time Out (Sydney) and The Sydney Morning Herald. Positive reviews were also received from The Daily Telegraph (Australia) and Australian media site Crikey. For Australia's Daily Telegraph Melissa Matheson described La Soirée as "circus like you’ve never seen before. It’s cheeky, it’s clever, and it’s damn sexy." Jo Litson from The Sunday Telegraph (Australia) called La Soirée "a rejuvenating dose of delirous escapism and the most fun-filled show in town". The Sydney Morning Herald’s review noted that "La Soirée’s cast shines, treating showmanship and an earthy connection with the audience with as much importance as the acrobatic, comedy and variety skills." In his review for Crikey, Lloyd Bradford Syke concluded: “La Soirée is all about joie de vivre. You’ll know you’re alive, for a couple of hours, at least."

== Awards and nominations ==
Year	Award	Category	Result
2015	Laurence Olivier Award	Best Entertainment and Family	Won
2015	Perth Fringe World Award	Best Cabaret	Won
2014	Off Broadway Alliance Award	Best Unique Theatrical Experience	Won
2012	Adelaide Fringe Festival Fringe Award	BankSA Pick of the Fringe	Won
2012	Adelaide Fringe Festival Fringe Award	BankSA Best Cabaret	Nominated
2012	Chortle Awards	Variety and Music Award	Nominated
2012	London Cabaret Award	Best One-Off Production	Won
2011	Evening Standard Award	Best Night Out at the Theatre	Nominated
2009	Les Globes de Cristal	La Meilleure Comédie Musicale (as La Clique)	Nominated
2009	Laurence Olivier Award	Best Entertainment (as La Clique)	Won
2005	Brighton Festival Fringe	Best of the Fringe Festival (as La Clique)	Won

== Burlesque and cabaret scenes ==
La Soirée has often been cited as an example of the recent mainstream popularity of the burlesque and cabaret genres, particularly in London. Mark Shenton wrote in The Stage that "burlesque has undergone something of a resurgence in the last few years, and La Clique/La Soirée have been a pioneering exponent of packaging it as something hip, accessible and intensely theatrical." In The Sunday Times, Stephen Armstrong writes: "Burlesque is striding into the mainstream, heels high, arms akimbo and nipple-tasselled chest thrust firmly forward. Although new burlesque started in America, it has been embraced with more fervour over here. La Soirée, for instance, brings together contortionists, male pole dancers, acrobats and comedy." In ES Magazine, Richard Godwin concurred: "Burlesque is booming. In 2008, the alternative variety show La Clique, which featured Ursula Martinez's subversive, pyrotechnic striptease among endearingly eccentric circus acts, won a Laurence Olivier Award and ran for nine months at the Hippodrome, London before smashing box-office records at The Roundhouse. The follow-up, La Soirée, is doing a roaring trade on the South Bank, where the run has been extended."

In a special issue dedicated to the flourishing London cabaret scene, Time Out′s Ben Walters says, "Thanks to La Clique and La Soirée, the Cabaret scene in London has never been bigger...West End crowds flock to grand-scale shows like the Olivier Award-winning La Clique and La Soirée." In the same issue, in listing La Soirée as a top burlesque pick and critics' cabaret choice, Time Out stated: "West End hit La Clique put cabaret performance on the mainstream map, and La Soirée is making sure the party continues." In her article for The Independent, Holly Williams writes: "the Edinburgh festival has, for the first time, a dedicated cabaret listings section – which is apt, given it was a fringe export, the spectacular La Clique, that spearheaded cabaret's renaissance."

In November 2011, La Soirée was nominated in the first annual London Cabaret Awards, which celebrate the growing cabaret scene in London. La Soirée won in the category of Best One-Off Show.
