= Paul Kieve =

English professional illusionist

- Born: Woodford, London
- Occupations: Illusionist, magic effects creator

Paul Kieve (born 1967) is an English professional illusionist whose consulting work for both stage and screen has contributed to changing how magical special effects in productions are approached. He is the only illusionist ever to have won a New York Drama Desk award (for Ghost the Musical on Broadway). He created the illusions for the 2014 Kate Bush concert Before the Dawn.

== Early life ==
Kieve was born in Woodford, North-East London and started magic at 10 years of age after receiving a magic set as a birthday gift.

== Early performing career ==
Kieve first performed publicly in 1983. In January 1984 at the age of 16 he performed card tricks in the music video for the Sade single Your Love Is King, his arms having been shaved to give the impression that the singer was performing the prestidigitation herself.

In April of that year he made his first television appearance on the BBC TV children's show Blue Peter, apparently cutting presenter Janet Ellis into three pieces .

In 1985 he was a finalist in the "Young Magician of the Year" competition.

Early professional engagements as a performer included a 1985 residency at the Xenon nightclub on Piccadilly, London and a summer 1986 run at the Inn on The Park, Jersey where he was resident support to acts including Bernard Manning, Gloria Gaynor, Bob Monkhouse, Rolf Harris and Ken Dodd.

In 1986 he and Lawrence Leyton formed The Zodiac Brothers and performed resident seasons in Sendai, Japan, on board the Cunard Line's QE2 and at the Magic Castle in Hollywood. When the Zodiac Brothers split in 1991 and Kieve made plans to attend university an approach from the Theatre Royal Stratford East to assist with illusions for a production of The Invisible Man marked the beginning of a new career as a magic consultant.

== Later career as magic effects creator ==
=== Stage ===
Credits include:

- Groundhog Day: The Musical, on Broadway and the Matthew Warchus and The Old Vic production with music and lyrics by Tim Minchin features illusions by Kieve.
- Mary Poppins at the Prince Edward Theatre, London.
- '"Derren Brown's Ghost Train" at Thorpe Park. Paul worked with Derren Brown and Merlin Magic Making to create some illusions for the attraction opening at Thorpe Park in May 2016
- Seeing is Believing, the Dynamo live show, UK Tour 2015
- Before the Dawn, the Kate Bush concert presented by the KT Fellowship (Hammersmith Apollo, London, 2014)
- Macbeth (Park Avenue Armory, New York, 2014)
- Side Show (Kennedy Center and St James Theatre, Broadway, 2014)
- Pippin (American Repertory Theatre, Boston, 2012/13, Broadway, 2013 and first US national tour, 2014)
- Matilda the Musical (West End and Broadway, 2011-current)
- Ghost the Musical (West End and Broadway, 2011–2012)
- Batman Live (UK and international arena tours, 2011)
- Alice's Adventures in Wonderland (The Royal Ballet, 2011)
- The Invisible Man (Menier Chocolate Factory, London, 2010)
- Derren Brown – Svengali (West End and UK tour, 2010)
- Zorro The Musical, (Folies Bergère, Paris, 2009–10. Moscow, Shanghai, Netherlands, West End, London, Atlanta)
- Arabian Nights (Royal Shakespeare Company, 2009)
- Peter Pan (Kensington Gardens, London 2009)
- L'Heure Espagnole (Royal Opera House, London, 2007-2008
- Lord of the Rings, (Toronto, 2006; West End 2007–2008)
- Scrooge – The Musical, London Palladium, West End. 2007/2008 and 2012/2013
- Carnesky's Ghost Train, London, 2005)
- Theatre of Blood (National Theatre, London, 2005)
- Our House (West End, 2003–2004)
- Holiday on Ice (various tours: 2001–2004, 2004–2007, 2006–2009)
- Parsifal (Opera National de Paris, Paris, 1997)
- The Witches (London, 1992, 1996 & 2005)
- Death Note (musical) (London, 2026)

=== Film ===
Kieve was magic consultant on the 2004 Harry Potter and the Prisoner of Azkaban for which he created a number of 'live' illusions including the floating spheres in the astronomy room and the self-folding marauders map. He also appears in the film performing sleight of hand magic making candles multiply in his fingers in the Three Broomsticks. He is the only real life magician to perform magic in any of the Harry Potter films.

He was magic consultant and instructor on Martin Scorsese's 2011 film Hugo, based on the magician and film maker Georges Méliès

=== Television ===
TV credits as magic consultant include:

- Luis de Matos – Mistérios, RTP Portugal, 2012
- Cranford, 2009
- For One Night Only, ITV, 2008
- Earthsea, 2004
- Heroes of Magic, Channel 4, 2004
- Derren Brown: Séance, 2004
- Derren Brown: Trick of the Mind, 2004
- The Animal Magic Show, BBC TV, 2000
- The Magic of David Copperfield XVI: Unexplained Forces, 1995

=== Work with other illusionists ===
Kieve has also acted as magic consultant to David Blaine, Arturo Brachetti, Geoffrey Durham, Dynamo, Jeff McBride and Dominic Wood.

=== Collaboration with visual and performance artists ===
Paul Kieve worked with French artist Orlan on Woman with Head, Woman Without Head at London's Institute of Contemporary Arts in 1996 and with multimedia artist Christian Jankowski on the short film The Flock in which he also appeared. with video artist Jonathan Allen He also created a ghostly dove sequence for the performance art project Carnesky's Ghost Train.

He worked with performance artist Rose English on Tantamount Esperance at the Royal Court Theatre and has collaborated with Marisa Carnesky on several projects including Carnesky's Burlesque Ghost Box for Duckie in 2002.

=== Other work ===
Kieve was magic consultant to Guinness World Records for its 2004 and 2005 magic sections (the only such sections ever carried by the book), researching with other illusionists including Penn and Teller, David Copperfield and Siegfried and Roy.

== Awards ==
- Drama Desk Award for Outstanding Set Design 2012 shared with Jon Driscoll and Rob Howell for Ghost the Musical
- British Magical Society's David Berglas Award for Outstanding Contribution to British Magic, 2007
- Guinness World Record in 2003 for quick change costumes in the West End musical Our House in which the lead character changed costumes 28 times in each performance.
- Awarded Gold Star membership of The Inner Magic Circle, London
- Academy of Magical Arts Creative Fellowship Award 2013 and Honorary Lifetime Member of The Magic Castle, Hollywood

== Published works ==
- Hocus Pocus: A Tale of Magnificent Magicians 2007 (UK), 2008 (US)

A fantasy-biography of sorts including various magic tricks and backstories on some of the world's most famous magicians, along with an introduction by actor Daniel Radcliffe, who Kieve coached during the filming of Harry Potter and the Prisoner of Azkaban.

== Stage magic historian ==
A keen student of the history of magic Kieve regularly lectures both on the history of stage magic and his own work. In 2011 he presented a talk on 'The Magic of Theatre' at the Magic Live conference in Las Vegas. He presented Grappling with Ghosts: Staging Ghost Effects in the Modern Theatre at the University of Westminster in 2009.

He has presented at the Essential Magic Conference – the ground-breaking online magic conference pioneered by Portuguese illusionist Luis de Matos and has lectured at the Magic Circle and the Hackney Empire in London.

Paul Kieve owns an extensive collection of historical magic memorabilia, some of which he loaned to the Hayward Gallery for its touring Magic Show (2009-2010) exhibition. He is a consultant curator of The Magic Circle Museum

== Trivia ==
Singer-songwriter Paloma Faith once worked as Paul Kieve's magic assistant.
