= Gerry Connolly (comedian) =

Australian comedian

- Born: Gerald William Connolly; 15 November 1957 (age 68); Rockhampton, Queensland, Australia
- Occupations: Actor, writer
- Years active: 1980−present
- Notable work: Fast Forward (1989); The Real Macaw (1998); The Gerry Connolly Show (1988)

Gerald William Connolly (born 15 November 1957) is an Australian comedian, actor, impressionist and pianist. He is best known for his satirical caricatures of public figures such as former Queen of the United Kingdom Elizabeth II, King Charles III, Margaret Thatcher, Ronald Reagan, Joh Bjelke-Petersen, Neville Wran, Malcolm Fraser, Bob Hawke, Paul Keating, John Howard, Bill Collins and Dame Joan Sutherland, among many others.

== Early life ==
Connolly was born in Rockhampton, Queensland. He studied at, and subsequently graduated from, the Queensland Conservatorium of Music in Brisbane, with a Bachelor of Music.

== Career ==
=== Comedy ===
Connolly has gained much notoriety in Australia and the UK, having much success at the Melbourne Comedy Festival and Adelaide Comedy Festival with his hit one-man shows, including Gerry Connolly - Alone or with Others and I, CONnolly. In 1986, his live performances earned him the Wallace 'Comedian of the Year' Award. He has also made many TV appearances, including spots on Fast Forward, Live and Sweaty, Tonight Live with Steve Vizard, Hey Hey It's Saturday and Kath & Kim, as well as his own series, The Gerry Connolly Show.

=== Television ===
He played the Headmaster in ABC's Dead Gorgeous. Connolly appeared as himself in the ninth episode of the 1998 Australian television series The Games (in which he impersonated Bob Hawke). In 2019, Connolly auditioned for Britain's Got Talent impersonating Queen Elizabeth II while roasting the judges. He was eliminated in the 2nd semi-final.

=== Film ===
In 1993, Connolly featured in a dramatic role portraying former Queensland premier Joh Bjelke-Petersen in the ABC telemovie Joh's Jury. He also had the major role of Lou Rickets in the Australian family film The Real Macaw in 1998, and made a cameo appearance as Father Murphy in The Wog Boy.

=== Theatre ===
Connolly has also had a successful career in the theatre, working with such groups as the Melbourne Theatre Company, Sydney Theatre Company and Belvoir St Theatre. He played the role of Mahoney in the Melbourne Theatre Company's 1999 production of Arturo Ui, which earned him a nomination for a Green Room Award for Best Supporting Actor. In 2022 he played the role of Mr Paravicini in the Australian tour of The Mousetrap.

=== Music ===
He has played piano with the Melbourne, Queensland and Tasmanian Symphony Orchestras, being featured in concerts televised across Australia and the UK.

== Filmography ==
=== Television ===
Year	Title	Role	Type
1988	The Gerry Connolly Show	Various characters	TV series, 6 episodes
1992	Acropolis Now	Larry ('Wheel of Language' Host)	TV series, 1 episode
1990–92	Fast Forward	Various characters / Queen Elizabeth II	TV series, 53 episodes
	Live and Sweaty		TV series
	Tonight Live with Steve Vizard		TV series
	Hey Hey It's Saturday		TV series
1997	Australian Story	Presenter	TV series, 1 episode
1998	The Games	Himself (as Bob Hawke)	TV series, episode 9
1999	Dog's Head Bay	Tony Du Clos	TV series, 1 episode
2004	Kath & Kim	Merrill Streep	TV series, 1 episode
2007	Spicks and Specks	Himself	TV series, 1 episode
2010	Dead Gorgeous	Headmaster Griffith	TV series
2015	Open Slather	Queen Elizabeth II	TV series, 1 episode
2016	Fancy Boy	Ian's Dad	TV series, 1 episode
2018	Stage Mums		TV series, 4 episodes
2019	Britain's Got Talent	Contestant (impersonating Queen Elizabeth II)	TV series (eliminated in 2nd semi-final)
2022	Irreverent	Minister	TV series, 1 episode

=== Film ===
Year	Title	Role	Type
1989	Police State	Queensland premier Joh Bjelke-Petersen	TV movie
1992	Over the Hill	Hank	Feature film
1993	Joh's Jury	Queensland premier Joh Bjelke-Petersen	TV movie
1993	A Royal Commission into the Australian Economy	Bob Hawke / Prince Charles / Geoffrey Robertson / Queen Elizabeth II	TV movie
1993	Camp Christmas	Queen Elizabeth II	TV movie
1995	The Search for Christmas	Himself	TV movie
1998	The Real Macaw	Lou Rickets	Feature film
2000	The Wog Boy	Father Murphy	Feature film
2000	The Magic Pudding	Dobson Dorking (voice)	Animated feature film
2012	Mystery of a Hansom Cab	Reginald Valpy	TV movie

== Stage ==
Year	Title	Role	Type
	Gerry Connolly - Alone or with Others	Himself	Melbourne Comedy Festival, Adelaide Fringe Festival
	Different Things	Joh Bjelke-Petersen	
	Pianomaniac	Joh Bjelke-Petersen	
1986	Two Boys and Two Girls		Belvoir Street Theatre for Sydney Festival
1986	Going Bananas	Comedian	Ringwood Cultural Centre, Melbourne
1987	Men and Women of Australia	Joh Bjelke-Petersen / various characters	Melbourne Athenaeum for Melbourne International Comedy Festival
1988	Not the 1988 Party!		Belvoir Street Theatre for Aboriginal National Theatre Trust
1989	Little Murders		Russell Street Theatre, Melbourne with MTC
1989	A Royale Commission		Police Auditorium, Melbourne for Melbourne International Comedy Festival
1989	Gerrymander Joh and the Last Crusade	Joh Bjelke-Petersen	Basil Jones Theatre, Brisbane
1990	Once in a Lifetime		Sydney Opera House with STC
1991	A Royal Commission into the Australian Economy	Prime Minister Bob Hawke, The Queen Elizabeth II / Prince Charles / Geoffrey Robertson	Universal Theatre, Melbourne for Melbourne International Comedy Festival, Space Theatre, Adelaide
1992	I, CONnolly - Icons and My Role in Their Demise	Joh Bjelke-Petersen / various characters	Fairfax Studio, Melbourne for Melbourne International Comedy Festival, Space Theatre, Adelaide
1993	The Grand Opening Galah	Comedian	Canberra Theatre with Comedy Summit
1993	The Grand Finale Galah	Comedian	Canberra Theatre with Comedy Summit
1993, 1996	A Night of Infectious Laughter	Comedian	Melbourne Athenaeum for Victorian AIDS Council
1995	Lady Windermere's Fan	Mr Cecil Graham	Playhouse, Melbourne with MTC
1996	Gala Re-Opening of the Regent Theatre	Artistic Performer	Regent Theatre, Melbourne
1998	Die Fledermaus		Lyric Theatre, QPAC Brisbane with Opera Queensland
1998	The Marriage of Figaro	Dr Bartholo, the Count's Doctor	Playhouse, QPAC, Brisbane with QTC
1999	The Resistible Rise of Arturo Ui	Goodwill / Mahoney / Various characters	Playhouse, Melbourne with Melbourne Theatre Company
2001–03	The Pirates of Penzance	Major-General Stanley	Lyric Theatre, Brisbane, Sydney Lyric, Canberra Theatre, Her Majesty's Theatre, Adelaide, Pilbeam Theatre, Rockhampton, Mackay Showgrounds, Cairns Convention Centre, Townsville Convention Centre, Darwin Entertainment Centre, Melbourne Concert Hall, Derwent Entertainment Centre, Hobart with Essgee Entertainment
2002	Melbourne International Comedy Festival Opening Charity Gala	Comedian	Palais Theatre, Melbourne
2002	The Eighth Annual Duesburys Canberra Area Theatre Awards	Actor	Playhouse, Canberra
2004, 2006	Urinetown	Caldwell B. Caldwell	Playhouse, Melbourne with MTC, Sydney Theatre with Sydney Theatre Company
2005	Cyrano de Bergerac	Subscriber / Priest	Playhouse, Melbourne with MTC
2005	Summer Rain	Harold Slocum	Sydney Theatre with STC
2006	Tomfoolery		Playhouse, Melbourne with MTC
2006	La Clique		
2006	La Soirée		Australia, New Zealand & UK tour
2008	Gala		Southbank Theatre with MTC
2012	Richard Tognetti's Festival Maribor	Master of Ceremonies	Slovenia with ACO
2012	A Funny Thing Happened on the Way to the Forum	Marcus Lycus	Her Majesty's Theatre, Melbourne with GFO
2012	La Clique Royale	Queen Elizabeth II	The Famous Spiegeltent, Edinburgh Fringe
2013–14	La Soirée	Queen Elizabeth II	Spiegeltent, Southbank for Brisbane Festival, Sydney Opera House
2014	Wuthering Heights	Nelly Dean	Cremorne Theatre, Brisbane with Shake & Stir Theatre Co
2015	Anything Goes	The Captain	Princess Theatre, Melbourne, Lyric Theatre, QPAC, Brisbane, Sydney Opera House with Opera Australia / GFO
	Sydney Opera House: The Eighth Wonder		Opera Australia
2016	The Opera	Queen Elizabeth II	Sydney Opera House
2018	Jive Cape Town Funny Festival	Queen Elizabeth II	Baxter Theatre, Cape Town
2019	PLEXUS: Phosphorescence	Spoken voice	Melbourne Recital Centre
2020	The Rise and Disguise of Elizabeth R	Queen Elizabeth II / Prince Charles / Margaret Thatcher / various characters (also composer)	Hayes Theatre Co
2021	The Variety Gala		Festival Theatre, Adelaide with STCSA for Adelaide Cabaret Festival
2022–24	The Mousetrap	Mr Paravicini	Theatre Royal, Sydney, Playhouse, QPAC, Brisbane, Comedy Theatre, Melbourne, Newcastle Civic Theatre with Shake & Stir Theatre Co

== Awards and nominations ==
Year	Nominated work	Award	Category	Result
1986	Gerry Connolly	Wallace 'Comedian of the Year' Award		Won
1999	Arturo Ui	Green Room Award	Best Supporting Actor	Nominated
2004	Gerry Connolly	Mo Award	Male Comedy Performer of the Year	Won
