= Amy Gordon =

Amy Gordon may refer to:

- Amy Gordon (cricketer)
- Amy Gordon (actress)

== See also ==
- Amy Gordon-Lennox, Countess of March, English peeress
