= Marisa Carnesky =

British live artist and showwoman

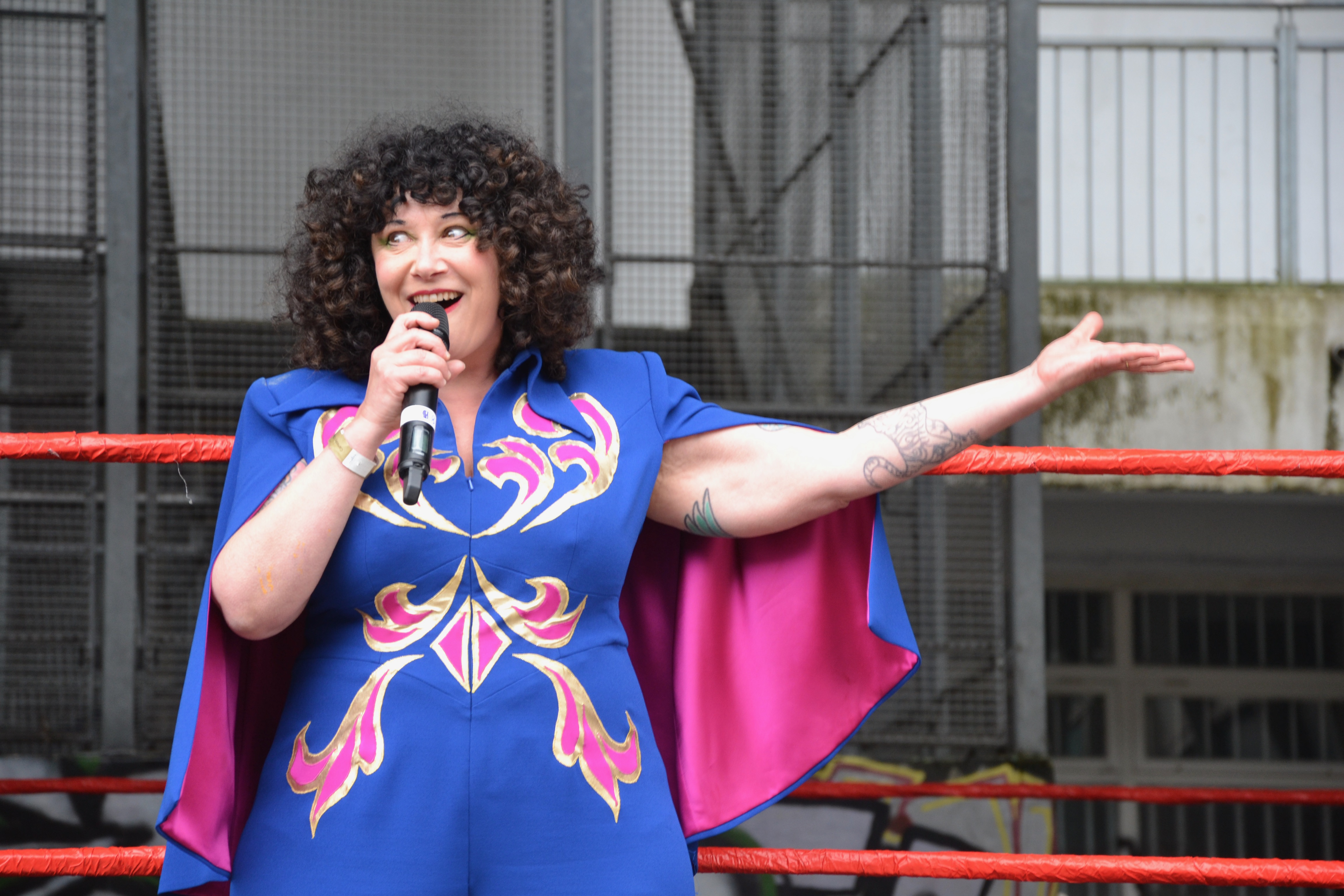
- Carnesky introducing Carnesky's Showwomxn Sideshow Spectacular in Brighton in 2024
- Born: 1 February 1971 (age 55)
- Occupations: Showwoman, Live artist
- Years active: 1992 to the present
- Website: carnesky.com

Marisa Carr (born 1 February 1971), who performs as Marisa Carnesky, is a British live artist and showwoman. She uses spectacular entertainment forms, including fairground devices and stage illusion, and draws on themes of contemporary ritual, to investigate social issues from an ecofeminist perspective. Time Out declared that Carnesky's 'unique niche of interactive end-of-the-pier esoterica has fused ghost trains, anatomical models and tattoo culture with religion, feminism and class consciousness in ways both playful and rewardingly demanding.'

Carnesky has won many awards, including the Laurence Olivier for Best Entertainment in 2004, Edinburgh Festival Herald Angel in 2005 and Time Out Best Theatre in 2004.

== Training ==
Carnesky studied ballet at London's West Street Ballet School (1987-8) followed by two years of a degree in Dance and Choreography at the Laban Dance Centre (1988–90). The Laban teachers told her that what she was doing 'was more performance art'. This led her, in 1990–3, to the University of Brighton, where she completed a Visual and Performing Arts degree taught by the choreographer Liz Aggiss. Aggiss recruited Carnesky into her company, Divas, which led to her first professional role, performing in 'Die Orchidee im Plastik Karton' in 1992.

== Alternative burlesque ==
In the 1990s, Carnesky moved to London where she worked in alternative burlesque. In 1994, she performed in, and was a deviser on, Robert Pacitti's Geek! Her 1990s solo performances included the commission for Lady Muck and Her Burlesque Revue at the Now Festival Nottingham (1996), the Nine Breasted Woman at the Duckie Prom Night at the ICA (1997) and Mademoiselle Lefort in the St Valentine's Day Pleasure Parade under the Vauxhall Railway Arches (1998). As a director and member of the Dragon Ladies troupe, including the late visual artist Amanda Moss, she co-created The Grotesque Burlesque Revue (1998) staged at Soho's Raymond Revue Bar. This was a surreal version of the Bluebeard story, featuring sailors, tattooed women, snakes, peacocks, and a woman transformed into a ship's mast, weeping 'tears of blood into the ocean'.

Carnesky also spent time in New York, where she posed for the performance artist Annie Sprinkle for her Pleasure Activist Playing Cards, and worked with the spoken word performer Jennifer Blowdryer in her Smut Fest, a live showcase of subversive sexual performance artists. She appeared in HBO's television series Real Sex and the 1998 TV documentary Showgirl Stories From Vaudeville to Vegas, directed by Agnieszka Piotrowska and narrated by Anjelica Huston.

== Jewess Tattooess ==
Carnesky's first full-length solo show, in 2000, was Jewess Tattooess, in which she explored the cultural and religious implications of being a heavily tattooed Jewess, breaking the religion's taboo against body art. It was while researching the work that she 'opted to reclaim the Latvian surname her grandmother had anglicised during the 1940s - Carnesky, fortuitously redolent of both carnival and the carnal.'

Jewess Tattooess included storytelling, fairground illusions, films (by Alison Murray) and a soundtrack by David Knight, Katherine Gifford and James Johnston. The most striking element was the live tattooing of a Star of David and a dragon onto Carnesky's flesh. While planning the piece, she described it as 'a mixture of a play...with a real event, real blood, my whole body on the line in the show. While I'm being tattooed my breath will change, my emotions will change. I'll have a needle in my back and I'll be talking about my fears of being tattooed and being Jewish.'

In Total Theatre, Dorothy Max Prior described Jewess Tattooess as 'a compelling piece of theatre informed by a visual arts sensibility; an expressionist dance merged with storytelling; a vaudeville entertainment that embraces the poetic. But above all a performance that invites the audience to witness the rite of passage from innocent childhood to informed womanhood.' Jewess Tattooess toured internationally and was staged at Battersea Arts Centre, the ICA, Riverside Studios, Arnolfini, Colchester Arts Centre, CCA Glasgow, Escena Contemporana, Spain; Ireland, Project Arts Centre; Cenpi, Croatia; Cultural Centre Serbia, Theatre Arsenic, Switzerland, Live Art – Kanonhallen, Denmark and the Los Angeles International Festival.

== C'est Barbican ==
As part of Duckie, the 'post gay' performance collective, Carnesky co-created and starred in C'est Vauxhall in 2002, originally staged at the Vauxhall Tavern, and renamed C'est Barbican when it transferred there during Christmas 2003. The show won the 2004 Olivier award for Best Entertainment. Renamed C'est Duckie, it subsequently toured to Manchester, Birmingham, Edinburgh, Sydney (Opera House), Berlin, Tokyo, Kyoto and New York.

== The Girl from Nowhere ==
In 2003, Carnesky created The Girl from Nowhere, a collaboration with the magician Paul Kieve and Hilary Westlake, director of the experimental theatre group Lumiere and Son. Using filmed testimony and magic illusions, the piece retold Jewish and eastern European folktales and stories of migration, exploring similarities between migrant journeys from East to West. The show was described by Dorothy Max Prior in Total Theatre as 'an evening of many pleasures perfectly executed.'

== Carnesky's Ghost Train ==
Girl from Nowhere led towards Carnesky's best known and most ambitious work, Carnesky's Ghost Train, in 2004, which also took migrant journeys as its subject. Carnesky told the Telegraph, 'When you go on a ghost train you become displaced. Ghosts and ghost trains are all about being frightened and being disorientated.'

Carnesky's train was a 400-square-metre wide fairground ride, built in a disused car factory in Dagenham. The creative team comprised illusionist Paul Kieve, creative producer Jeremy Goldstein, video artist Jonathan Allen, set designer Laura Hopkins, musician Rohan Kriwaczek, sound designer Lance Dann and the performers Paloma Faith, Geneva Foster Gluck, Violetta Misic, Agnes Czerna and Tai Shani.

In The New Statesman, Judith Palmer described the piece as "part art installation, part visual theatre and part fairground ride - a purpose-built train whisking audiences 20 at a time through a magical environment of optical illusions and performance vignettes...In silk kimonos and jaunty tutus, a succession of powdered lovelies wafts silently in and out of our vision - reaching out through broken windows, floating above station platforms, sinking into the floor, or spinning in midair....women contorted into small spaces, cut in half, suspended between realities, lost between border crossings." In a four star review in the Guardian, Lyn Gardner described the rides as "a marvellous mix of technical wizardry and sheer heart and soul."

The train toured the UK for five years, and had residencies at the Trumans Brewery in Brick Lane, Coventry City Centre, Glastonbury Festival and Zomer Van Antwerpen in Belgium. It then became a permanent attraction in Blackpool's Golden Mile, in collaboration with the Blackpool Illuminations, where it won the 2011 British Tourism Award. Reviewing the show in Blackpool, Libby Purves wrote in The Times: 'Combining a cultural classy edge with a lot of enjoyable screaming, Carnesky's Ghost Train is a passionate tribute to war scattered refugee ghosts. It was a success in London and is now even better, both more serious and more fun.'

== Magic War ==
In 2007, Carnesky created Magic War, inspired by the French government's use of the stage magician, Robert Houdin, to suppress an uprising in Algeria in 1856. With dramaturgy from Lois Weaver and Flick Ferdinando, the show included stage magic from Paul Kieve, and costumes and props by Sarah Munro and Mark Copeland of the Insect Circus. Carnesky appeared as Athena the goddess of strategic war, reimagined as a stage magician performing illusions, accompanied by a male stage assistant, played by various actors.

In her Guardian review, Lyn Gardner described the piece as 'an intriguing look at war and violence, and the illusions to which we all fall prey....(It) combines magic, commentary and audience participation. One hapless audience member is cast as a terrorist and the audience asked to determine her fate based on a series of questions. There are serious points here about ethics and retribution, made all the more horrific when she is sent to the guillotine.'

== Teaching ==
In 2008–11, Carnesky was artist in residence at the Roundhouse in London, where she established Carnesky's Finishing School, teaching performance skills to young people aged 17–21 over four semesters. In 2015–16, the school had a pop-up residency in the former Foyles building in Soho. Carnesky, assisted by Lisa Lee of Lipsinkers, offered students 'classes in esoteric PE, situationist clowning, unpopular expressionism and transmetaformism.' The students were then taken through the process of devising, creating and performing their own work on stage in front of a paying audience. Graduates of the school include MisSa Blue, Laura Gwen Miles, Tallulah Haddon, Tom Cassani, Oozing Gloop, Amethyst Phoenixx and Oberon White.

In 2019, The Finishing School moved to the Tramshed in South East London, where it was renamed Carnesky's Radical Cabaret School. In 2022, Carnesky began leading a three year BA degree course in Contemporary and Popular Performance for the Rose Bruford College. The course, partly based in the Tramshed, "focuses on practical performance skills like magic, clowning, burlesque and wrestling, taught by cutting-edge practitioners."

== The National Fairground Archive ==
From 2007–2010, Carnesky had a Creative and Performing Arts Fellowship at the National Fairground Archive in Sheffield University. In her honour, in 2011, the University 'presented a spectacular exhibition and a feast for the senses, Memoirs of a Showwoman.' Displays showcased costumes from Carnesky's shows, including the dress worn by Paloma Faith for Carnesky's Ghost Train, collaborative work with artists such as Anthony Bennett, Sarah Munro and Mark Copeland, and previously unseen material from her personal archive. The National Fairground Archive now holds a Marisa Carnesky Collection.

== Dystopian Wonders ==
For the Roundhouse Circus Festival in 2010, Carnesky made Dystopian Wonders. She played the role of a morbid 'Madame Tussauds'-esque showwoman guiding audiences through her 'bizarre exhibition of curious nameless bodies that merge flesh with beautifully constructed wounds and organs made of wax, silk and embroidered felt. One has two heads. A naked lady levitates. A glamorous contortionist disappears into an open torso. Among the featured artistes was Marawa The Amazing, who gracefully climbed a ladder of sabres barefoot, recreating a turn made popular by the female French magician and crocodile-charmer, Koringa, in the 1930s.'

Following the Roundhouse production, 'Dystopian Wonders' was staged at the Crucible Theatre Sheffield, the Lowry Salford and Chelsea Theatre.

== The Quickening of the Wax ==
Anatomical models inspired The Quickening of the Wax, staged by Carnesky on Halloween night in 2010 for the Chelsea Theatre's Sacred festival. The Time Out listing described the show: 'Marisa Carnesky, long fascinated with the body as a site of abjection and storytelling, draws on her penchant for the uncanny with a Halloween show unlike any other. Magic, horror and social history combine as anatomical models come to life in spectacular, ritualistic fashion'. The creative team comprised Anthony Bennett (wax work sculptor), Rasp Thorne (music), Helen Plewis (performer and choreographer), Marty Langthorne (lighting designer) and Jon Marshall (magic illusions).

== Carnesky's Tarot Drome ==
Carnesky's Tarot Drome, first staged at the Old Vic Tunnels in 2012, was a large-scale promenade show using interactive installations, skate routines, Mexican wrestling and a live rock band. The creative producers were Lara Clifton and Dicky Eaton, the costumes were by Claire Ashley, and a large fairground facade was painted by Martha Copeland.

Audience members, given their own card reading using the Tarot of Marseilles, were invited on an interactive journey in which Carnesky played ringmaster to a dozen Tarot card figures. The Time Out reviewer described 'eye-contact encounters with the likes of the Empress (Suri Sumatra), all enveloping arms and seductive fruit; the Chariot (Rhyannon Styles), who combines transgender identity and sleb-culture narcissism; and Death (Nina Felia), a transformative figure who emerges from striking immobility into unbounded flexibility. Bosch-style beasties, self-sufficient singalongs and aquatic thrashings are also to be found....It's a rich, heady and provocative experience.' The Tarot Drome was later staged at Latitude Festival (2013), and the Cirque Jules Verne in Amiens (2014).

== Dr Carnesky's Incredible Bleeding Woman ==
In 2013–19, Carnesky completed a PhD at the University of Middlesex. The title of her thesis was 'Dr Carnesky's Incredible Bleeding Woman, Reinventing Menstrual Rituals Through New Performance Practices'. As part of her research, she assembled a group of women, the Menstruants. For nine months, on every dark moon, they gathered at Metal, the Southend Arts Centre, where they devised ritual performances.

Carnesky also put on a stage show, in which she appeared as a lecturer presenting a condensed version of her research. The lecture was described by Maddy Costa as 'a playful survey of mythology and religion and art that has, over the centuries, attempted to capture and control the menstruating woman, harness her power for patriarchy's advancement.' The Menstruants (Fancy Chance, Rhyannon Styles, MisSa Blue, H Plewis and Nao Nagai) appeared on stage and on film, enacting their rituals, 'a carmine carnival of sword-swallowing, body-sawing and hair-hanging, carnal in its original sense of human, of the flesh.'

The show was staged as a work in progress in 2015 at University College London, as part of the Radical Anthropology Group. Here Carnesky and Dr Camilla Power launched an activist group, the Menstronauts, which any woman could join to create menstrual rituals. Power and Carnesky wrote, 'We believe that disregard for the cycles of the human body echoes a disregard for the cycles of the planet and for each other. We seek to reclaim time through respect for the bodily cycles we evolved as humans, and for the original cultural means of counting time – the waxing and waning of the moon.'

Dr Carnesky's Incredible Bleeding Woman, produced by Lara Clifton with dramaturgy from Kira O'Reilly, toured widely. In 2017, it was staged at the Soho Theatre, the Underbelly, Southbank, and the Edinburgh and Adelaide Fringes. This was followed by a 2018 residency at the Attenborough Centre for Creative Arts at Sussex University, which commissioned a further development of the piece. A UK tour followed ending with a return to Soho Theatre. The show received universal acclaim from the critics.

== Showwoman. Ritual. Action ==
In 2019, Carnesky presented a new work in progress, Showwoman. Ritual. Action, at the British Library and for Duckie at the Vauxhall Tavern. This grew out of her thesis, in which she wrote, 'I am a Showwoman. With two Ws in the middle, one for the show and one for the woman.' Here she described the role of the Showwoman 'using her spectacular vision in acts that are transformative and collaborative and an antidote to the entertainment traditions of the exploitative tropes of the showman.' Her collaborators were David Sheppeard (creative producer), Elf Lyons (dramaturg) and Mark Copeland and Sarah Munro (costumes and design).

== Showwomen ==
The work in progress led to Showwomen in 2022, written and devised by Carnesky with Veronica Thompson AKA Fancy Chance, hair hanger and comedienne, Livia Kojo Alour, sword swallower and spoken word artist, and Lucifire, a fire performer. There was a specially commissioned soundtrack by James Johnston (Gallon Drunk), Kath Warg (Snowpony, Stereolab) and Dave Knight (Danielle Dax, Unicazurn), fusing archival sound material with contemporary compositions.

Alongside the live performers, the show was a celebration of earlier showwomen, from Miss La La the 1880s aerialist to Florence Shufflebottom, the 'British Annie Oakley' who displayed her sharp shooting in the 1950s. Carnesky described the other performers in an article for Run Riot!: "The Showwoman is not a new thing....My research found she was very prolific in the 1920s and 30's in the UK before war broke out and the theatres went dark. She was embodied by performers like Koringa from the Bertram Mills Circus who had a concrete block broken over her stomach and laid on a bed of nails as well as work for the French resistance. She was there in Lulu Adams the first known British woman clown who went on performing despite the tragic and sudden death of her performing partner and husband. She was there in Marjorie Dare dressed in leather in the 1920's riding a motorbike on the wall of death." In an interview, Carnesky told GScene, "The stories that get told and the people that get remembered are mediated by social and economic forces that tend to overlook working class, female and queer artists. This show will attempt to give these forgotten performers the credit they deserve."

Carnesky and Alour were interviewed for a feature in The Guardian by Kate Wyver, who linked the show with Carnesky's teaching: "Throughout history, rare skills like [sword swallowing] have been overlooked, a fact Carnesky is attempting to counter with a new undergraduate degree in contemporary and popular performance, which champions acts that have emerged from circus and the sideshow. Through Showwomen and the new BA, she wants to elevate these sidelined forms of mass entertainment, "to take away the snobbery and the hierarchy from spectacle", she says."

Showwomen toured the UK in May–June 2022, with performances at Cambridge Junction, Norwich Arts Centre, the Attenborough Centre for the Creative Arts (ACCA), Colchester Arts Centre and Jacksons Lane. It then toured again February–May 2024, performed at The University Of Sheffield Drama studio, The Dukes, The Lowry, and at The Hippodrome as part of the Out There Arts Festival.

Elanor Parker reviewed the show at ACCA: "Fire and whip artist Lucifire completely entrances with her whip lashing skills, each crack sending shivers down the audience's spines. Sword performer Livia Kojo Alour belts out a song that fizzles with energy: a celebration of her life, and the power of saying no. Clown and chief researcher Marisa Carnesky openly admits she'll leave the dangerous stuff to others, but ties the show together with moments of levity and reflection. Fancy Chance's hair hanging is performed with such delicacy and grace, it becomes transcendental; it is as if she is a swan in human form, performing ballet in mid air....Formidable, feminist, satirical, and spectacular, this is a show which appreciates the corporeal and spiritual in tandem."

Carnesky also wrote and directed a mini documentary to accompany the live show, which can be seen on YouTube.

== Carnesky's Showwomxn Sideshow Spectacular ==
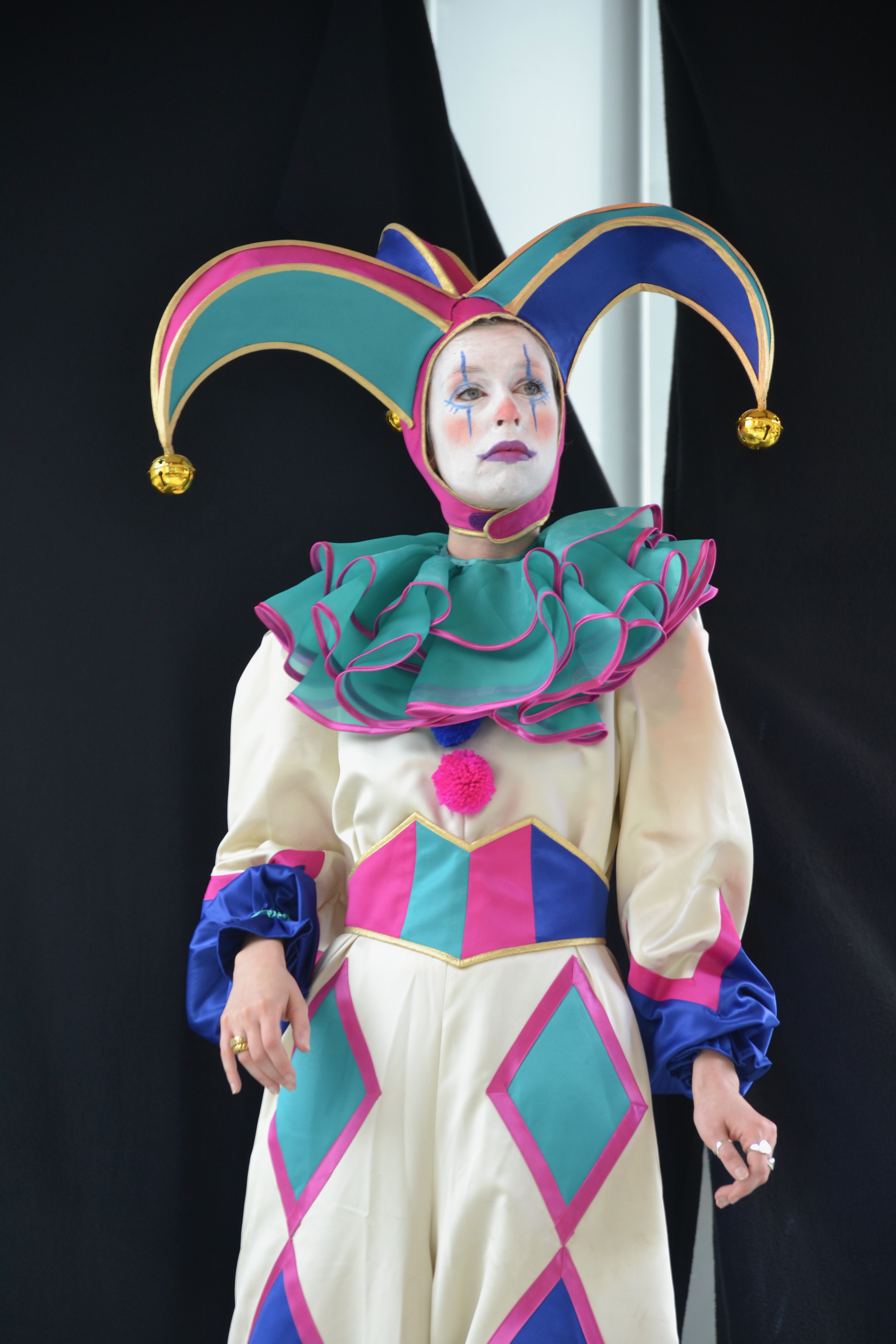
Meg Hodgson in Carnesky's Showwomxn Sideshow Spectacular

Carnesky's Showwomxn Sideshow Spectacular was a large scale outdoor promenade performance made by Carnesky for the revival of Bartholomew Fair in London's Smithfield Market on 16 September 2023. It was then recommissioned by Brighton Festival in 2024, where it was staged from 25–26 May in the Elder Place Corridor. It featured 33 women and non-binary performers, including aerialists, wrestlers, illusionists, glass walkers, drag kings, contemporary clowns, whip crackers, sword climbers, sideshow performers, variety dancers, contortionists, unicyclists, performance artists, storytellers, hula-hoopers and hair hangers. They performed on nine stages, decorated with fairground banners carrying slogans such as "Otherness is Hers" and "Marvel at Spectacular Matriarchal Utopias".

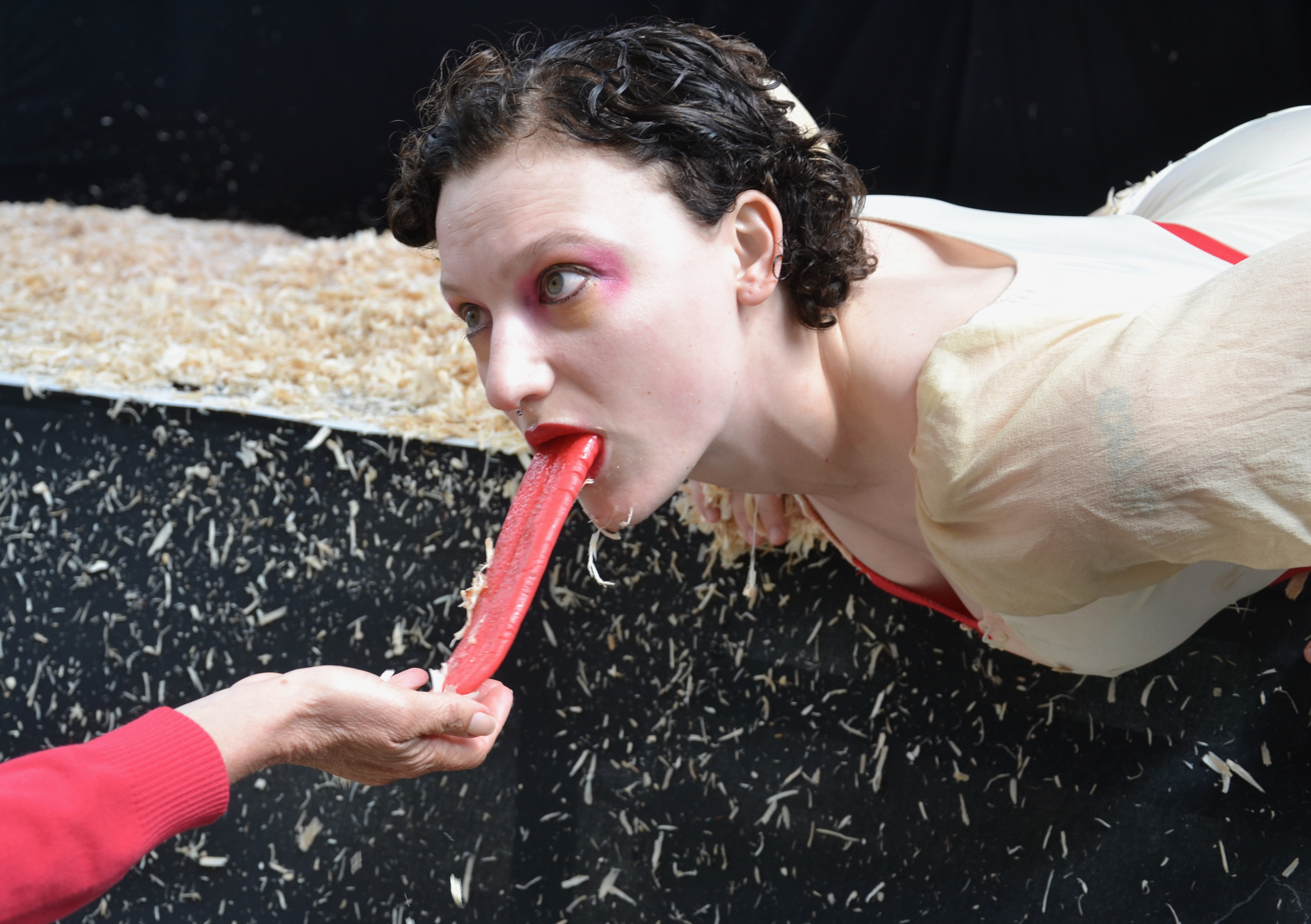
Tallulah Haddon in Carnesky's Showwomxn Sideshow Spectacular

A GScene review described the show: "The staging and decorations are vintage fairground with a modern aesthetic totally on point and hand painted by local queer muralist Dave Pop, the ethereal atmospheric electronic soundscape by The Fast Set waves its teasing audio over the spaces and original costumes by House of Flying Stitches offers up a fantastic array of superb outfits....This all moving, attention grabbing, spectacular physically transforms a forgotten side street into a large-scale immersive extravaganza, and leaves you grinning, gaping and seriously impressed with the extraordinary range of skills and talents on display."
