= Amy Gordon (actress) =

American actress and singer

Amy Gordon (born in Seattle, USA in 1974) is an American actress and singer based in Brooklyn.

== Early years ==
Dedicated to acting since childhood, Gordon earned a BA in Theater Arts magna cum laude from Western Washington University. In her early years as an artist, she trained in theater, comedy, and singing.

== Career ==
While working as a choreographer for the play A Mouthful of Birds, she founded a production company called Crossbreeding Productions, with Michelle Matlock. They produced various plays in the East Village.

In 2001 she joined Jonah Logan, with whom she worked at Bindlestiff Family Cirkus, and they created the Daredevil Opera Company, with which for six years they developed 5 shows that they presented at the New Victory Theater on Broadway and around the world.

Gordon was the first comedian to lead the Big Apple Circus.

To date, one of her biggest roles has been in Tyler Perry's A Fall From Grace.

With her solo show, Entershamement, she toured for over 7 years in various countries (UK, Ireland, Australia, France, Germany, Austria and Czech Republic. Until 2020, she had made 52 works, presented in 40 countries, in 7 languages.

=== Major plays ===
- Cirkus Inferno
- La Soireé
- Anti-Gravity’s Crash Test Dummies
- Entershamement
- Amy G: Round She Goes
- Amy G: On a Roll
- Absinthe 2006

== Awards ==
- 2014 Off-Broadway Theatre League's "Best Unique Theatrical Experience" - La Soireé
