= Amy Lamé =

American-British performer and writer

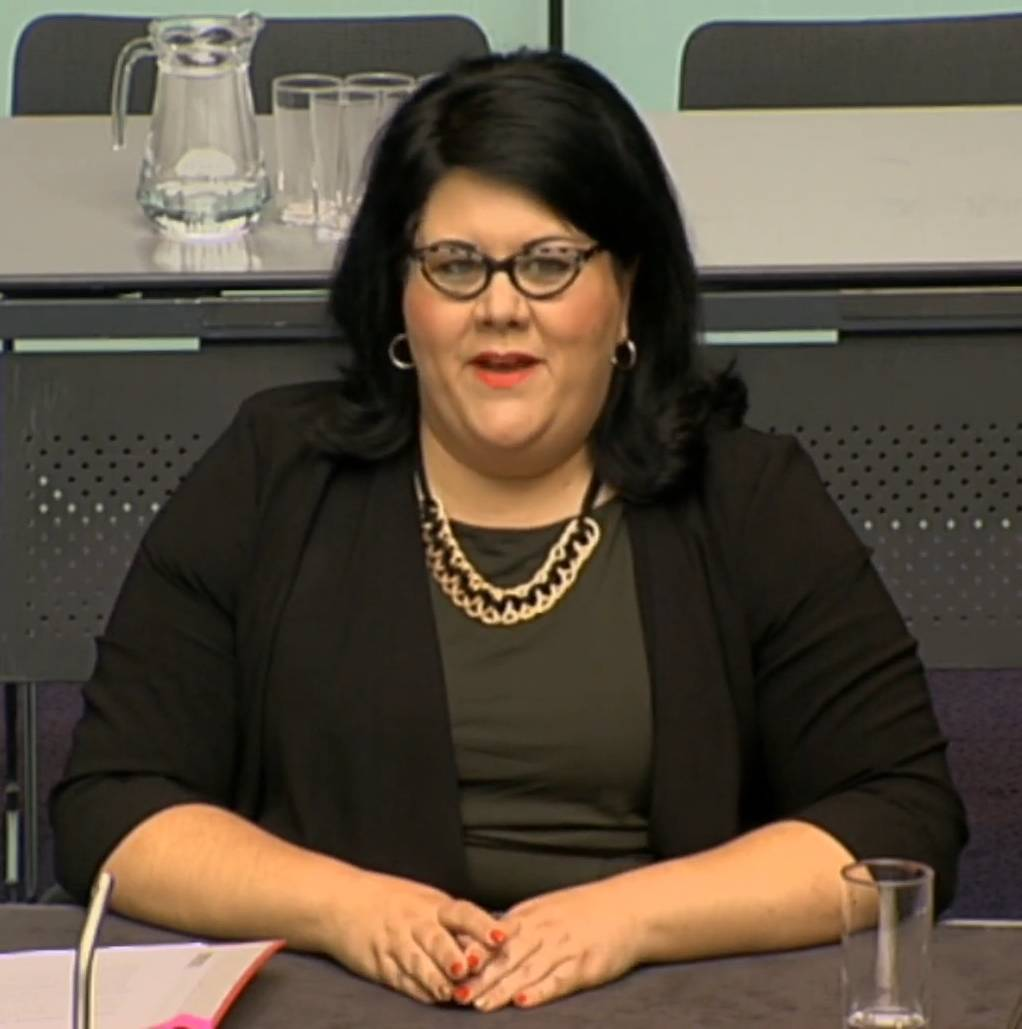
- Lamé in 2017
- Born: Amy Caddle; 3 January 1971 (age 55); Keyport, New Jersey, U.S.
- Citizenship: United States / British
- Occupations: Broadcaster, consultant
- Notable work: Duckie
- Spouse: Jennie Lamé

Amy Lamé (née Caddle; born 3 January 1971) is an American-British performer, writer, media presenter, and former public official. She is known for her one-woman shows, her performance group Duckie, LGBT-themed media works, and her controversial service as London's "Night Czar".

Lamé was appointed by the Mayor of London, Sadiq Khan, as the city's first Night Czar in November 2016, with the responsibility of promoting London's varied nightlife both in the UK and internationally, including safeguarding venues across the city.

== Biography ==
Amy Lamé was born and raised in Keyport, New Jersey, and moved to London in 1992.

She is a lesbian and is married to Jennie (née Hogan), her partner since 1995.

== Career ==
=== Radio ===
Lamé presented alongside Danny Baker on BBC London's afternoon show which aired 3–5pm from Monday to Friday. On 1 November 2012, it was reported by Danny Baker that the show had been axed and that Lamé earned £50 per episode.

She was the co-founder and co-presenter of HomoLab, a weekly queer cultural and current affairs podcast, which ran from December 2010 to June 2014.

Having sat in for a number of DJs on BBC Radio 6 Music (including Tom Ravenscroft, Lauren Laverne, Nemone, and Steve Lamacq), Lamé began hosting her own weekly Sunday show on the station from January 2018, replacing Jarvis Cocker's Sunday Service.

=== TV ===
Lamé was a presenter on the BBC 2 show GaytimeTV for 3 series and then went on to create and host her own panel game-show, The Staying in Show for Channel 4. Lamé has appeared on ITV reality show Celebrity Fit Club. She was a panellist on Loose Women in 2004 and CelebAir, and on Market Kitchen. She was the mentor for LGBTQ teenagers on Channel 4's My Big Gay Prom.

In 2009, she appeared in a Doctor Who related documentary titled Look 100 Years Younger, included on the DVD release of The Twin Dilemma, in which she discussed with actor Colin Baker the various costumes worn by the character of the Doctor over the decades. In 2012 she appeared on Channel 4's live satirical comedy/news programme 10 O'Clock Live to discuss the current state of the National Health Service.

=== Writing ===
Lamé has contributed short stories to the anthology Typical Girls. She also writes regular features on culture, travel, and food for The Times.

=== Duckie and other works ===
In 1995, Lamé, with Simon Strange, co-founded the Olivier-award-winning queer performance-club-night and collective Duckie, which she hosts every Saturday night at the Royal Vauxhall Tavern, a historic gay venue in Vauxhall. In 1996 she curated, produced and hosted Keep The Faith at Tate Britain which explored the links between the gallery's permanent collection and faith. She commissioned new work to be shown in the gallery for one night only including an interactive performance installation tea party with 30 Anglican priests; Joshua Sofaer's tale of meeting his Jews for Jesus missionary namesake, Joshua Sofaer, in Namesake: The Story of a Name; Jonathan Allen/Tommy Angel's performance exploring evangelism and belief using magic and illusion; and a Buddhist tour of the gallery. The event had the highest ever recorded number of participants – over 5,000 – for a Late at Tate.

In 1996, her second one-woman show, Cum Manifesto, a show about safer sex for gay men, debuted on Hampstead Heath and toured to gay male cruising grounds around the UK and Scandinavia. Working with the Duckie collective in 1997, Lamé produced and hosted The World's First Lesbian Beauty Contest.

In 2006, Lamé created her third one-woman show Amy Lamé's Mama Cass Family Singers. The show debuted at the Edinburgh Fringe Festival and was later performed at the Soho Theatre, London, toured the UK and performed at The Powerhouse, Brisbane, Australia

She made her stage debut in her first one-woman show Gay Man Trapped in a Lesbian's Body as part of ICA London's 'Spring Exhibitions' programme.

She founded the social enterprise Pom Pom International and has held pom-pom-making parties at Duckie, London's Lesbian and Gay Festival 2008 and in Northern Ireland where she held the 'Pom-poms for Peace Project'.

=== London Night Czar ===
On 4 November 2016, London Mayor Sadiq Khan announced that Lamé would become the first London night czar and would be tasked with ensuring that London continued to thrive as a 24-hour city. She was initially awarded a salary of £116,925 per year for the role and was given a 40% pay increase in 2023. Shortly after her appointment, she was praised by Khan for her role in negotiating the reopening of the Fabric nightclub. During her tenure, London was heavily impacted by the COVID-19 pandemic and its night time economy declined significantly. Data showed that between March 2020 and December 2023, 3,011 night economy businesses in and around the capital closed, the steepest fall for any English region.

Her role and the ability for the London Assembly to hold her to account was a source of confusion, given that she was classed as a GLA member of staff and therefore could not be scrutinised by the Liberal Democrats, Conservatives, or the Greens in the London Assembly. In October 2024, Lamé's resignation from the role of night czar was announced. The news came in the wake of heavy criticism of her perceived inaction in the role.

== Politics ==
Lamé is an active member of, and fundraiser for, the Labour Party.

She is mentioned in Sarah Brown's memoir Behind the Black Door (2011), where she details Lamé's hen night celebrations in Downing Street.

From May 2010 to May 2011, she held the ceremonial role of Mayoress of Camden alongside the Mayor, Councillor Jonathan Simpson.

In 2014, Lamé sought nomination to be the Labour candidate for the South London seat of Dulwich and West Norwood. She was unsuccessful, losing to Helen Hayes.

In October 2018, Lamé successfully managed to lobby Waitrose to change the name of its Gentleman's Smoked Chicken Caesar Roll, after arguing that it was sexist.

=== Controversies ===
Shortly after her appointment in November 2016, Lamé was ordered to delete a number of offensive tweets about the Conservative Party, which included celebration of the death of Margaret Thatcher and fantasies of assaulting David Cameron and Sayeeda Warsi.

In July 2018, Lamé was criticised by prominent music industry figures such as Four Tet and Andy Peyton after Hackney Council voted to make new businesses close at 11pm under new licensing laws.

In March 2019, after live music venue The Social was saved from closing after a fundraising campaign, figures such as Andrew Boff called Amy Lamé's role as night czar into question, arguing that the position is an ineffective job and should be scrapped.

In February 2020, it emerged that Lamé was paid an extra £1,000 out of Mayor of London Sadiq Khan's culture budget to host a drag act at Walthamstow Assembly Hall, which charged a £15 entry fee.

In January 2025, Lamé was criticised for setting up a ‘global consultancy’ company called "24hr Cities". Critics alleged she was seeking to profit from her experience as London Czar despite nightlife eroding during her tenure “while taking home a substantial salary”.
