= Frodo (disambiguation) =

Frodo Baggins is a fictional character in The Lord of the Rings by J.R.R. Tolkien.

Frodo may also refer to:

== Given name or nickname ==
- Fróði, the name of a number of Danish kings, Latinized as Frodo
- Frodo (chimpanzee)
- Frodo, nickname of Magomedrasul Khasbulaev, Russian mixed martial artist

== Software ==
- Frodo, a Commodore 64 emulator
- Frodo, a bare-bones version of the Slax Linux distribution
- FRODO (Federated Repositories of Online Digital Objects) projects, part of the Australian government's Systemic Infrastructure Initiative
- Frodo, codename of the XBMC Media Center software version 12

== Other uses ==
- "Frodo", a song by New Zealand folk-duo Flight of the Conchords
- Frodo, Kakao Friends characters

== See also ==
- Captain Frodo (born 1976), Norwegian contortionist
