= Marawa Ibrahim =

Australian performer, athlete, and author

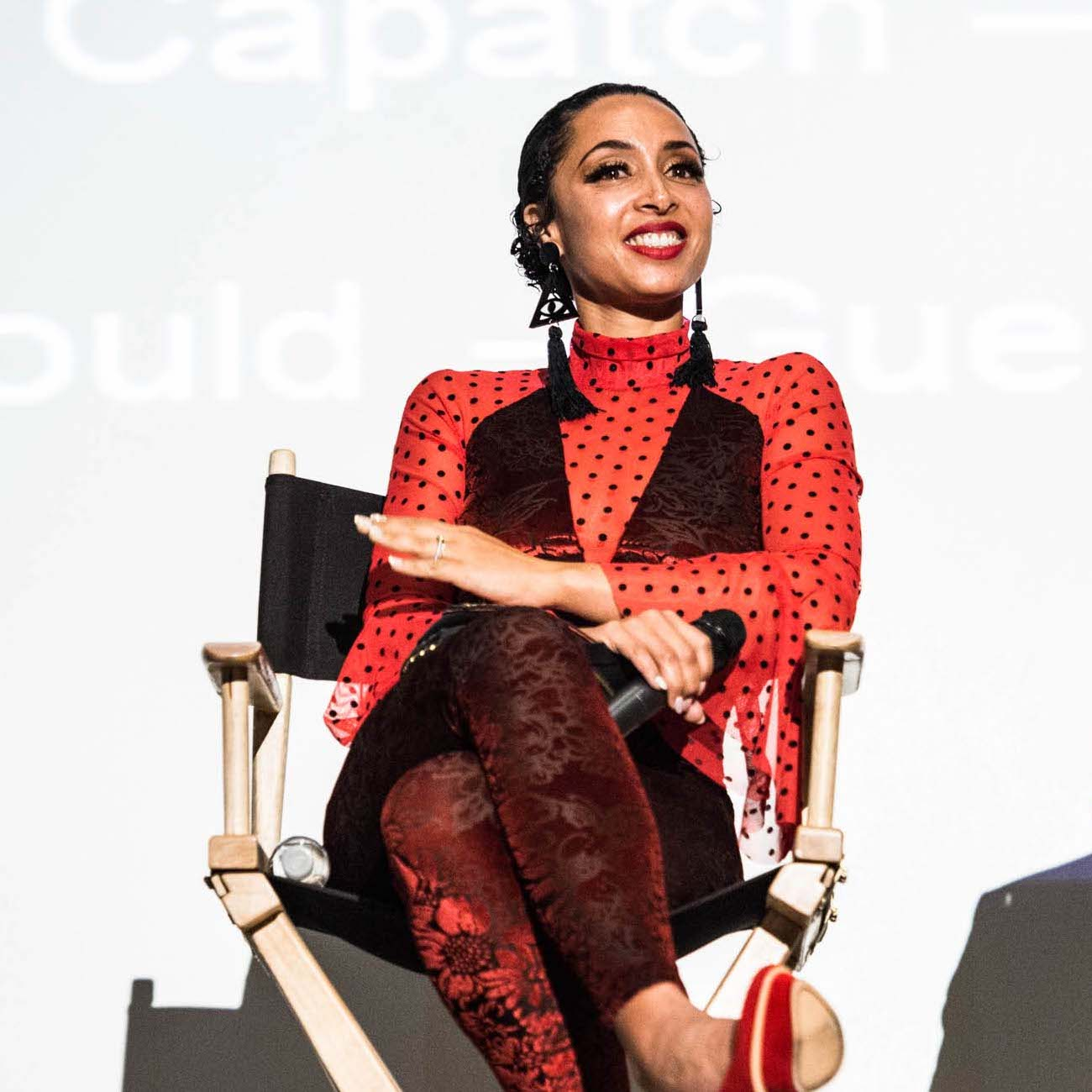
Marawa the Amazing speaks during the premiere of the Lucha VaVoom documentary on 17 October 2018.

Marawa Ibrahim (formerly Wamp; born 1981 or 1982), often known by the stage name Marawa the Amazing, is an Australian-born performer, athlete, and author. She has held 12 different Guinness World Records, but is best known for holding the record for the most simultaneous twirling hula hoops, having spun 200.

== Early life and education ==
Born the oldest of four children to a Somali father and Australian mother, Ibrahim grew up in Australia, Papua New Guinea, and the Middle East. The family eventually moved to the Melbourne suburb of Camberwell. Ibrahim moved to the United Kingdom in 2007, then eventually moved to Los Angeles in 2016.

Ibrahim has roller skated since the age of two. She studied rhythmic gymnastics as a child, which is where she first hula hooped. Ibrahim attended Strathcona Girls Grammar, then studied social science at university before switching to a degree in circus arts. She specialized in swinging trapeze and graduated in 2004 with a bachelor's degree from Melbourne's National Institute of Circus Arts.

== Career ==
In 2007, Ibrahim began performing her hula hoop act with La Clique, a variety show that included cabaret, burlesque, and circus performances.

Later in 2008, Ibrahim went on to perform the role of Josephine Baker in the show Désir, a Spiegelworld production. She played the role for six months, earning a positive review from the New York Times: "A banana-skirted virtuoso of the Hula-Hoop named Marawa Ibrahim blissfully reincarnates Josephine Baker as channeled by Betty Boop." Ibrahim then continued performing with La Clique, and eventually joined other La Clique cast members to perform in La Soirée's inaugural season in London in 2010. Also in 2010, Ibrahim performed in the Marisa Carnesky stage show Dystopian Wonders, where Ibrahim climbed a ladder of swords barefoot, recreating an act popularized by Koringa in the 1930s.

Ibrahim then created a solo show, Exotica, that she performed in the 2011 Jacksons Lane Postcards Festival. The solo show covered a history of exoticism in women and performance, including such women as: Saartjie Baartman, Josephine Baker, Koringa, and Yma Sumac. Each act was based on one of the featured women and Ibrahim's circus skills, which included: trapeze, hoops, the ladder of swords, high-heeled skates, dance of the seven veils, and a watermelon on her stomach getting sliced in half.

In 2012, Ibrahim launched a U.K.-based hula hoop troupe—the Majorettes—and performed with them at the London Olympics. Ibrahim and the group have been credited as helping repopularize hula hooping. While in London, Ibrahim also held her weekly hula hoop class Hoola Schoola, and taught and performed with the Majorettes.

Ibrahim performed with her hula hoops and skates in Lucha VaVoom and appeared in the 2018 documentary Lucha VaVoom Inside America's Most Outrageous Show. Other notable performances of Ibrahim's include hooping on stage with Toddla T and performing regularly with Major Lazer at London's annual Notting Hill Carnival; she has also starred in music videos for Chilly Gonzales and Eliza Doolittle.

In 2019, Ibrahim premiered her own circus show, Quality Novelty, at Adelaide Fringe. The group of novelty acts included juggling popcorn pieces in the performer's mouth, a performer spinning 100 hula hoops, and a performer skating while whipcracking.

=== Skating ===
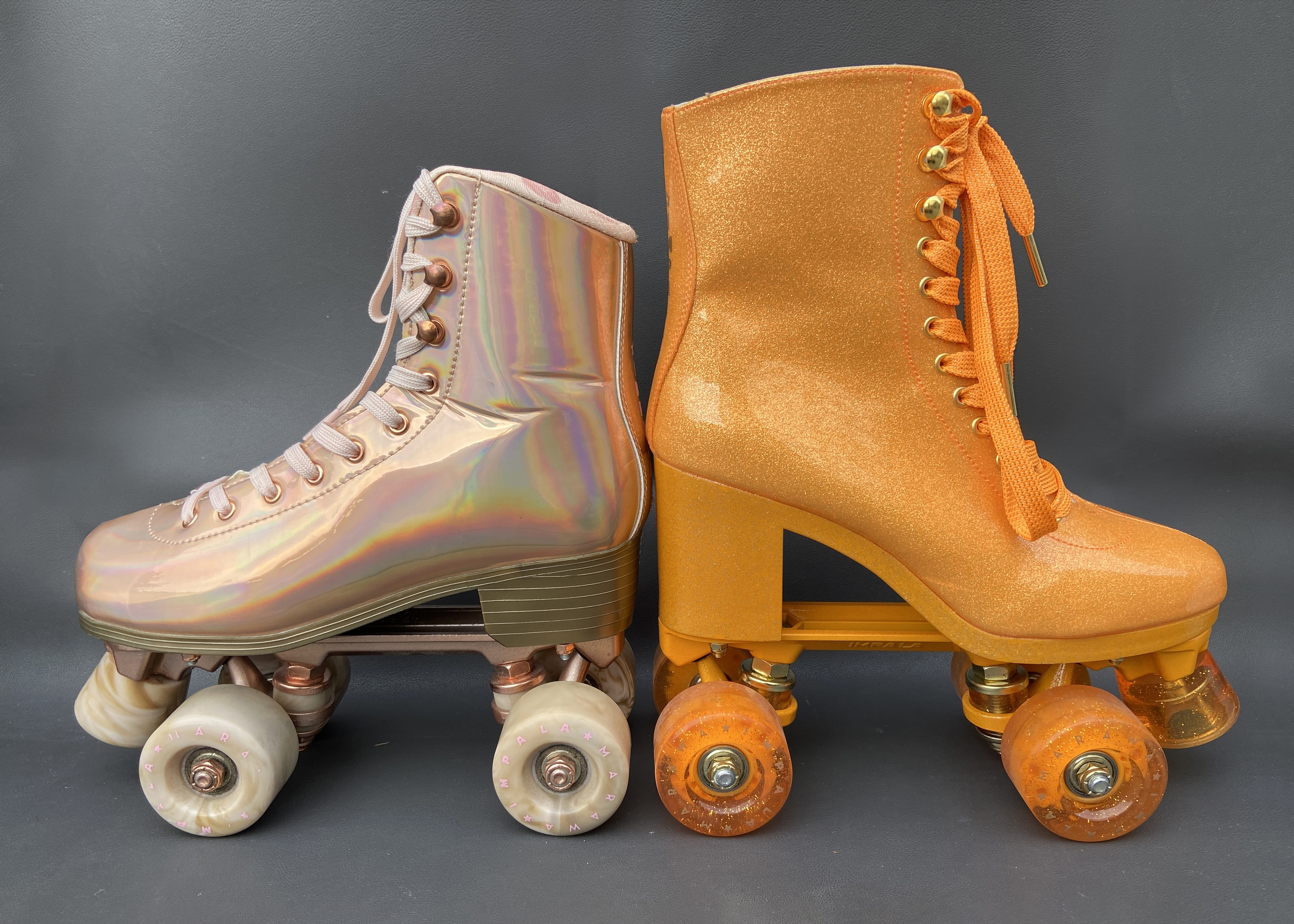
Comparison of the quad skates Marawa created in collaboration with Impala Skates. The rose gold skate (left) has a traditional sized 4cm heel, the orange skate (right) has an 8cm high heel.

Roller skating has held a prominent role in Ibrahim's career. For instance, a notable early feature was at the 2008 Sydney Mardi Gras where Ibrahim roller-skated onstage while Olivia Newton-John sang a ten-minute version of the theme from Xanadu.

Ibrahim is particularly known for skating in high-heeled roller skates. The initial design of "Heels on Wheels" was created by Hannah Havana, which Ibrahim then commissioned a functional pair for her personal use. One of Ibrahim's world records was set using a pair of skates using customized high-heels by British shoe designer Terry de Havilland.

In 2022, Ibrahim collaborated with the brand Impala to create the first commercially available high-heeled roller skate. Ibrahim had previously collaborated with the brand on a popular rose-gold roller skate design in 2019.

=== Other work ===
Ibrahim's book The Girl Guide was published in 2018 by HarperCollins and illustrated by Sinem Erkas. The book is geared towards preteen girls navigating puberty and discusses a variety of topics including body image, menstruation, bras, eating and exercise, meditation, gender identity and expression, moods, and more. Ibrahim incorporates personal stories—including menstrual leaks, a yeast infection, and chafed thighs—to help normalize the events for young readers and provide encouragement. The book's illustrations include cut-paper illustrations of a variety of vulvas and a photo of Ibrahim with makeup on only half her face to demonstrate the power of makeup and Photoshop.

Ibrahim owns a gear shop, I Want to Go to Paradise. Ibrahim also runs Hooper Market in East London, where hula hoop supplies can be purchased and where she and The Majorettes practice and offer lessons.

== Television appearances ==
Ibrahim has competed in four different Got Talent shows, namely: America's Got Talent, Arabs Got Talent, Australia's Got Talent, and Britain's Got Talent. Ibrahim was a semi-finalist in both Britain's Got Talent and Arabs Got Talent, competing in the fifth series of Britain's Got Talent in 2011 and Arabs Got Talent in 2015. There were 300 million live viewers during Ibrahim's run on Arabs Got Talent, and one of her performances included a burning hula hoop.

== World records ==
Ibrahim holds the current record for most simultaneous twirling hula hoops at 200 hoops. This was her fourth time breaking the record. Three of the hoops rely on the use of her long middle fingernail to provide extra length when her arms are outstretched to the side.

Ibrahim holds the record for the fastest 100 metres travelled in high-heeled skates. She also holds the records for the fastest 100 metres on roller skates while spinning three hula hoops and the longest duration on high-heeled roller skates while spinning three hula hoops. Additional records of Ibrahim's include the farthest distance on high-heeled roller skates while spinning eight hula hoops, the fastest mile while hula hooping, and the most hula hoops spun while suspended from the wrists.

With the Majorettes, Ibrahim achieved the record for the most hula hoops spun by a group of 10; they set the record in 2013, spinning 264 hoops. They also hold the record for the most passes of a hula hoop by the feet in one minute by a team of 8, by passing 26 hoops on 3 September 2017.
