= Bernie Dieter =

German cabaret artist

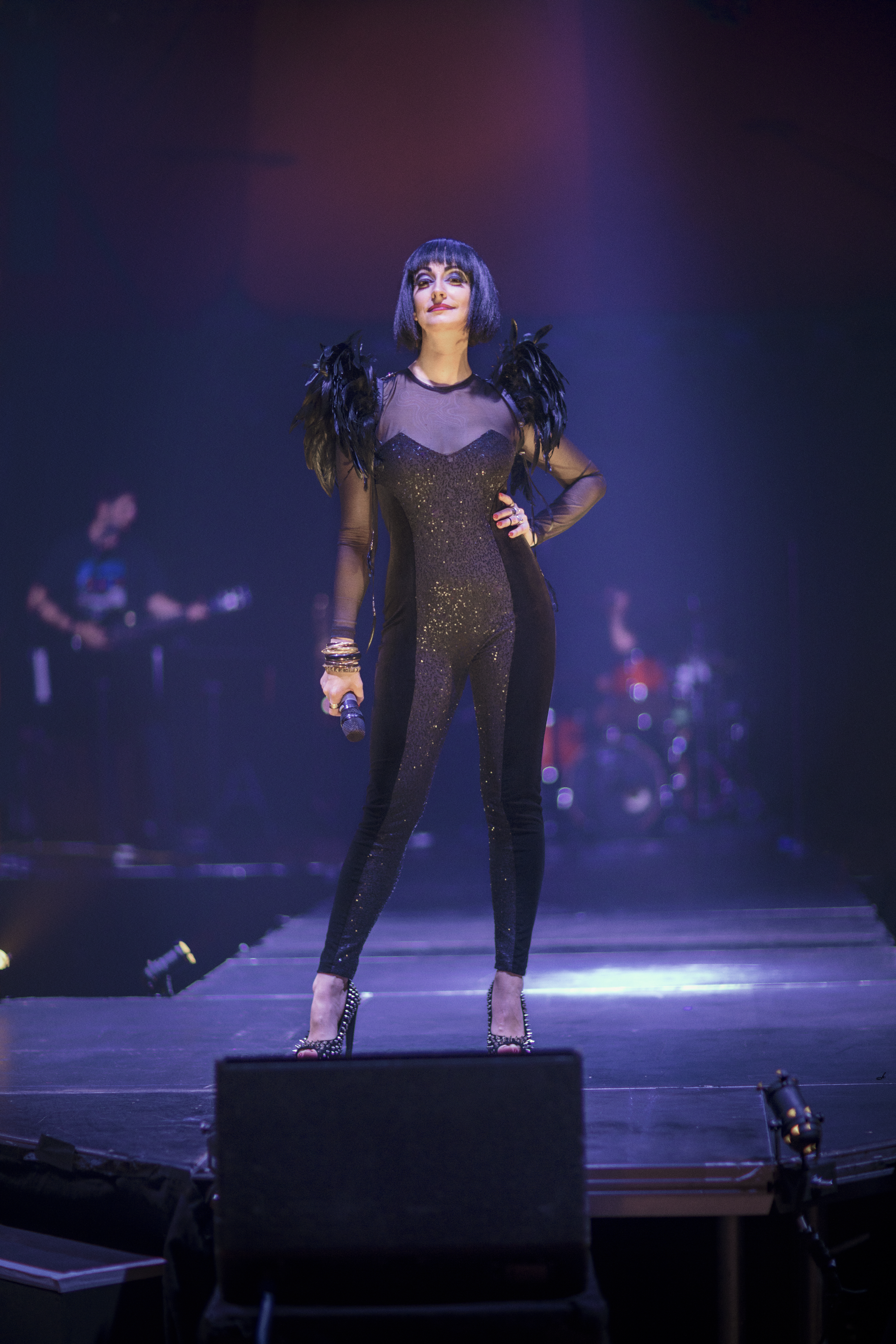
- Bernie Dieter in The Spiegeltent

Background information
- Born: October 2, 1986 (age 40); Koln, Germany
- Genre: Cabaret Dark Cabaret punk Cabaret kabarett
- Occupations: Singer-songwriter; musician; performance artist
- Years active: 2011–present
- Label: Dead Man Label
- Website: www.berniedieter.com

Bernie Dieter (born 2 October 1986) is a cabaret artist, songwriter, and performance artist born in Köln, Germany described as the "undisputed Queen of punk cabaret" and known for her unique voice, dark humour and original songs 'She sings like Marlene Dietrich, like Frank N. Furter, like Kate Bush on speed.' She is the lead singer and songwriter of Bernie Dieter and the Vier and creator of The Little Death Club.

== History ==
Growing up in Koln, Germany she ran away from home as a sixteen year old to live above a drag club in Berlin Bernie has cited her grandmother (Oma) as an inspiration on many occasions as her family ran a travelling circus in Germany, and fled from East to West post World War II. She has since gone on to tour internationally, but primarily in Europe and Australia.

She was named as one of Time Out magazine's Top Ten "Cabaret Superstars", become the first female MC of the Olivier Award-winning show La Clique, and created the Kabarett Little Death Club which has gone on to tour the world picking up several high profile awards.

== Style ==
Bernie is known as a modern feminist chanteuse, taking the Weimar essence of cutting-edge, satirical social commentary as well as the sex and debauchery, and updated it into the 21st century. She known for her sex positive original songs, feminist ballads and her prowess in the realm of audience interaction. Her style is heavily inspired by The Rocky Horror Picture Show. Siouxsie Sioux, she's been likened to other German cabaret singers Marlene Dietrich and Ute Lemper are often cited with her music mostly written in English and German. She has celebrated Diversity (politics) to create an inclusive atmosphere at her shows.

== Little Death Club ==
First created in 2017, inspired by the Weimar Republic's dens of iniquity, gender bending sexual freedom and celebration of difference at a time of political turmoil, but relating it to a 21st-century audience. The show subverts traditional forms of circus, cabaret and drag, and gently pokes fun at itself and the genre, whilst mocking popular stereotypes of gender and sexuality, the shows main theme is to celebrate the feminine, the masculine and everything in between.

The shows name comes from the English translation of the French 'la petite mort' (the little death) which is an expression which means "the brief loss or weakening of consciousness" and in modern usage refers specifically to "the sensation of post orgasm as likened to death.

The shows usually takes place in a Spiegeltent and involves live original music, written and performed by Bernie and her band 'The Vier' with accompanying circus, drag and comedy. The shows previous guest drag performers include Le Gateau Chocolat, Art Simone, Myra DuBois and Karen from Finance, with circus performers including Beau Sargent, Kitty Bang Bang, Fancy Chance, Jared Dewey. The show's music has been likened to The Rocky Horror Picture Show and Hedwig and the Angry Inch but is sonically eclectic and is a mixture of dark cabaret punk, weimar, jazz, electronica performed with a 4 piece band consisting of electric guitar, electric bass / double bass, piano / keyboard / synth, drums.

Major Seasons for Little Death Club include Edinburgh Festival Fringe in the Beauty Spiegeltent August 2018 and 2019 where the show made the ‘Top 5 best reviewed shows’ of the festival (from over 3,800 shows) both years, Perth in the West Australian Spiegeltent 2019 and 2020 where the show won ‘Best Variety show’. The show made its London debut in the Southbank Festival Spiegeltent from April 23 – June 23, 2019
