= Captain Frodo =

Norwegian contortionist (born 1976)

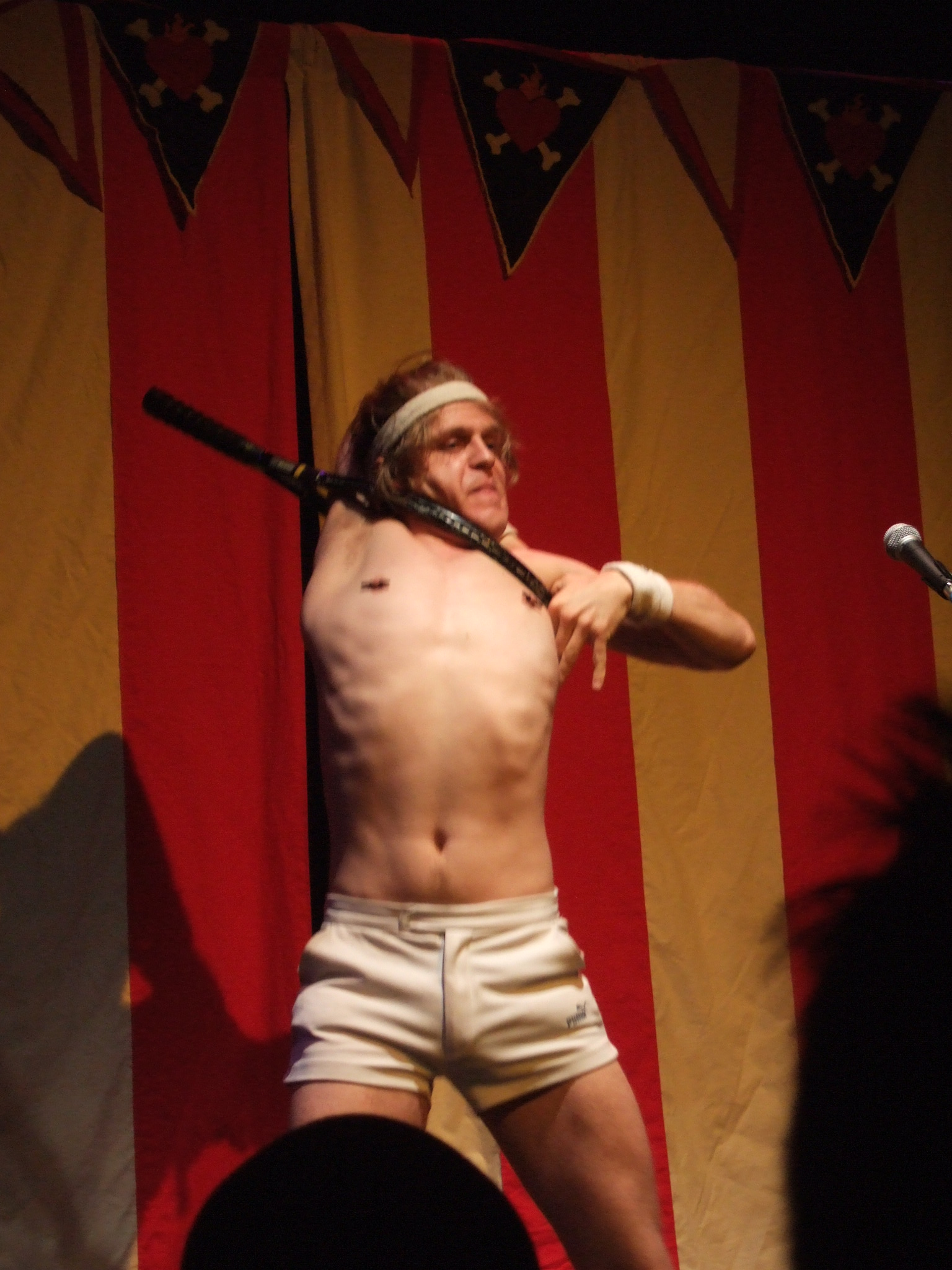
Captain Frodo passing through a tennis racket

Captain Frodo (born 1976 in Haugesund, Norway), also known as "The Incredible Rubberman", is a Guinness World Record breaking contortionist living in Australia. He is the son of a famous Norwegian magician known as "The Great Santini".

Frodo was born double jointed which means he can dislocate joints, he uses this as the basis for most of his acts. He has been performing since he was eight years old starting out as an assistant at his father’s magic show. He now performs solos acts in varieties around the globe.

== Career ==
After working as a street performer, Captain Frodo joined the cast of "The Kamikaze Freakshow" in 1998. Two years later in 2000 started the Australian freak show "The Happy Sideshow" with Space Cowboy, Shep Huntly and Tigerlil.

From 2004 to 2006, Frodo toured with Circus Oz in Australia and two seasons in London. After leaving Circus Oz, Frodo embarked on two season solo show in Adelaide and Melbourne.

Since 2006, Captain Frodo has performed to great critical acclaim with Australian variety show La Clique in numerous cities including Sydney, New York, Montreal, London, Paris and at the Edinburgh Festival Fringe.

In then summer seasons 2014 and 2016 he toured Denmark with Zirkus Nemo, which is a combination of a circus and a comedy show owned by Danish actor and comedian Søren Østergaard. The later year he was awarded as the best act of the year in Denmark by the Danish Circus Award.

== Television appearances ==
Frodo has performed on British television in 2007 on "When Will I Be Famous", hosted by Graham Norton, in which he reached the semi-final with his contortion act. He also performed his act in 2009 on "The Paul O'Grady Show".

Frodo has appeared twice on Irish The Late Late Show.

In November 2009, Frodo performed as a member of the cast of La Clique on Canal+ "Le Grand Journal".

== World records ==
Captain Frodo holds two Guinness World Records, the first one for "Most Sword Swallowers Swallowing the Same Object Simultaneously". The record involved swallowing the leg from the same chair with three other swallowers: The Space Cowboy, Thomas Blackthorne and Gordo Gamsby.

The second record is for the "Single Sword Swallowed by the Most Sword Swallowers" (in 1994) which is shared with 43 other sword swallowers: Thomas Blackthorne, Dai Andrews, Roderick Russell, Dan Meyer, Damien Blade, Johnny Fox, Ses Carny, Frack, Malakai, George the Giant (George McArthur), Peter Pokus, Red Stuart, Lizard Man, Bill Berry, Mr. Pennygaff, The Great Fredini, Jewels, Natasha Veruschka, Todd Robbins, Tim Cridland, Tyler Fyre, Miss Behave, Wasp Boy, Lucky Diamond Rich, Claudio Borghi, David Straitjacket, the Space Cowboy (real name Chayne Hultgren), Elena Sellentin, Marco Cardona, Helmut Hannibal Helmurto, Gordo Gamsby, Barry Silver, Lenore "Angel" Lovelace, Alexsander, Eric Kloeliker, Manx, Julz, Sideshow Stevie, Luther Bangert, Donny Vomit, Tom Balmont and The Mighty Gareth.
