= Sally O'Reilly =

British writer and critic

Sally O'Reilly (born 1971) is a writer, performance maker and teacher. She writes fiction and non-fiction for print, video and performance, is the author of two novels, a novella and several libretti. O’Reilly also performs solo and ensemble pieces in contemporary art and experimental music contexts and is a founding member of Big Throw performance collective (2024–ongoing).

A former art critic, O'Reilly has contributed to Art Monthly, Contemporary Magazine, Frieze, Cabinet, Modern Painters, and Time Out, and has written catalogue essays for numerous international art exhibitions. Her book The Body in Contemporary Art was published by Thames and Hudson in 2009, and Mark Wallinger by Tate Publishing in 2015. She was Writer in Residence at the Whitechapel Art Gallery in 2010/11, is a tutor at Royal College of Art, London, and teaches at various other universities around the UK. In 2009, O'Reilly published the survey The Body in Contemporary Art (Thames & Hudson, 2009), updated and republished under the same title in 2025.

O'Reilly co-edited Implicasphere, a broadsheet periodical published twice a year and distributed in Cabinet magazine, which sought to 'unearth and revive compelling, illuminating and curious ideas in the form of image and text fragments taken unadulterated from fields as diverse as folk craft, nuclear physics, metaphysical poetry, pulp novels, linguistics, criminology, film noir and astrology'.
O'Reilly co-curated the Hayward Gallery Touring Exhibition Magic Show, with Jonathan Allen and was producer and co-writer of The Last of the Red Wine, a radio sitcom based in the artworld devised and performed at the ICA, London, 2011.

She wrote the libretto for the opera The Virtues of Things in collaboration with British composer Matt Rogers. The piece was commissioned by the Royal Opera House, Aldeburgh Music and Opera North, directed by Bijan Sheibani and performed in May 2015. It deals with themes of abstraction and representation, technological modernisation and the powerful influence of objects on humans. In 2016 the Henry Moore Institute dedicated an issue of its journal Essays on Sculpture to the opera.

O'Reilly is the author of two novels – Crude (Eros Press, 2016) and Help in Cucumbers (JOAN, 2023) – and a novella, The Ambivalents (Cabinet, 2017), which was written in 24 hours.

The satirical novel Crude is set in a country called Academia, an inverted reality in which scholars and critics are celebrities. Its heroine, critic Ida O'Dewey is 'a seasoned art critic who has inadvertently incurred the wrath of her superiors by making some injudicious remarks on a radio show; her struggle to extricate herself from bureaucratic censure prompts her to reflect on the systems of power that circumscribe and sustain academic knowledge and cultural discourse.' Ostracised from her milieu, O'Dewey is diverted by a fascination for oil production, falling into a very different world in which that substance is raised to a redemptive status. According to a reviewer for The White Pube: 'Oil is presented to us as this opaque substance with the potential to destabilise everything this world is built upon; Ida interacts with it as a researcher (of course - because she’s an art critic, it makes sense), she travels through it as a subject, and that’s how we understand it as an element in the story'.

Help in Cucumbers is a fictional memoir set in a London pub. Informed by O'Reilly's experience of working in pubs, the novel features characters who create a kind of site-specific art in and around the bar room. The book inspired the one-day event The Jobs Market at Camden Arts Centre, 8 July 2023, co-curated with Susan Finlay, which brought together writers and performers focusing on the theme of work, including Morgan Quaintance, Sean Ashton and The Something Puffs.

== Bibliography ==
- Help in Cucumbers, London: JOAN publishing, June 2023
- The Ambivalents, New York: Cabinet Books, 2017
- The Virtues of Things, Henry Moore Institute: Essays on Sculpture series, no.75, 2016
- Crude, London: Eros Press, October 2016
- Mark Wallinger, London: Tate Publications, 2014
- The Body in Contemporary Art, London: Thames & Hudson, 2009 / 2025
- Implicasphere, co-edited with Cathy Haynes, 2003–8

== Awards ==
- David and Yuko Juda Art Foundation Award, shortlisted 2019
- Republic of Consciousness Prize, longlisted 2017
- Paddy and Joan Leigh-Fermor Arts Fund Award, winner 2013
