= Ursula Martinez =

British entertainer

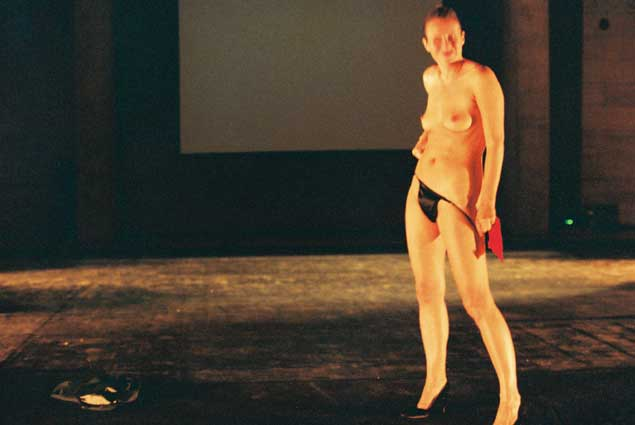
Ursula Martinez on stage in 2005.

Ursula Martinez (born 1966) is a British theatre maker, performer and director. She grew up in South London, the daughter of an English father and Spanish mother, both teachers.

After graduating in French and Theatre at Lancaster University, she began performing cabaret turns on London's club circuit, in particular the iconic queer performance club, Duckie. After much success as a cabaret performer, Martinez went on to create theatre shows, both solo and collaborative.

Three shows in which she starred, C'est Duckie, La Clique and La Soirée, have won Olivier awards.

== Cabaret ==
In one of her early cabaret acts, Viva Croydon, Martinez drew on her Anglo-Spanish heritage to create 'a flamenco skit on the joys of South London multiculturalism, where Cordoba meets Cor Blimey.'

Martinez followed Viva Croydon with her most famous act, Hanky Panky. Combining magic with striptease, Martinez repeatedly makes a red handkerchief vanish and re-appear from an item of clothing, which is then removed until she is naked.

Hanky Panky was described in the Daily Telegraph as 'one of the most inventive striptease routines ever devised'. The act brought Martinez international notoriety after she performed it in La Clique in the Famous Spiegeltent during Edinburgh Fringe in 2004. After attending a performance, Maureen Lipman wrote in the Guardian: 'I couldn't imagine that removing a jacket, skirt and underwear with a bolshie attitude could be that empowering. She...finished by removing it from a place that brought howls of appreciation from every corner of the roundest of venues. Like Gypsy Rose before her, Ms Martinez had the last laugh on generations of the exploitations of her sex.'

In 2006 a recording of the act was illicitly posted online and overnight became a viral sensation. It has since been viewed by millions of people all over the world, and is still in circulation over a decade later.

In 2009, La Clique won the Olivier award for Best Entertainment. Accepting the award, Brett Haylock, La Clique's creative producer, said 'Who could have ever imagined that a show that involved a woman pulling a hankie out of her vagina would ever win an Olivier Award.

== A Family Outing, Show Off and OAP ==
Martinez's first theatre show was A Family Outing in 1998, co-written with and directed by Mark Whitelaw. In this personal, autobiographical show, Martinez 'unpicked family life, myths and relationships with the help of her Mum and Dad who appeared alongside her on stage'. In The Guardian, Lyn Gardner wrote that the show was 'a seemingly improvised but cunningly orchestrated psychodrama about the pleasures, pains and embarrassments of family relationships in a format that is part game show, part Jerry Springer and part family photo album'. In The Independent, Maggie O'Farrell described the A Family Outing as 'hilarious, devilish and brilliant: Martinez has, if you like created a new theatrical genre.'

Collaborating again with director Mark Whitelaw, Martinez's second theatre piece Show Off (2000), examined 'the myth of celebrity and ... the notion of identity and the performing ego, both on and off stage'.

In 2003 Martinez and Whitelaw created OAP which confronted Martinez's fear of ageing. The publicity read: 'Single, childless and fast approaching 40, Martinez anticipates a sad and lonely old age. Will she become a wise and respected old sage, or a dreary old hag who goes on and on about how she used to be a cutting edge performance artist.'

In 2006 Martinez performed A Family Outing, Show Off and OAP at the Barbican as a trilogy of autobiographical work entitled Me Me Me! Lyn Gardner described the trilogy as 'highly complex investigations into reality and fiction, autobiography and lies, and the nature of identity itself, her own most of all.'

== Office Party ==
Commissioned by The Barbican in 2008, Martinez and fellow Duckie artist, Kit Green, created the award-winning Office Party. This was 'a huge piece of experiential theatre....the ultimate night out where you take part in the annual bash of a fictional company.' The show was originally directed by Cal McCrystal and subsequently co-directed by Martinez and Green for its post-Edinburgh London transfer.

== My Stories, Your Emails ==
When Martinez’ Hanky Panky routine went viral on the internet in late 2006, she received thousands of emails from all over the world. Primarily from men, some of the emails were inappropriately intimate, lustful and/or derogatory. Soon after, interviewed in The Guardian, Martinez said: 'What I do is the complete opposite of a traditional striptease. Put it on the internet, where it can be viewed at the click of a button, it becomes something else entirely. I feel that I've lost control of something whose power and impact came entirely from the fact I was in control.'

Martinez's initial reaction was to avoid reading the emails. She told an Australian interviewer, 'Once I calmed down about it, I opened the Pandora's box of emails and I thought, this is amazing material, this is amazing insight into the world at large and the internet and virtual relationships and the delusion of internet relationships.'

In 2010, Martinez and Whitelaw created My Stories, Your Emails, a theatre piece about 'public perception and personal identity and the gulf between the two – about how a five-minute, silent performance can acquire a life of its own'. It was in two halves. The first half, My Stories, revealed Martinez's 'representation of herself from her own point of view. They feature what family have said to her, things she remembers, essentially those stories that we all have inside of us'. After showing the video of Hanky Panky, Martinez then read out a selection of the emails, using different accents to convey the character she imagined for each correspondent. She also showed the pictures which had accompanied them.

Some reviewers raised the ethical question of Martinez's right to share other people's private messages and pictures. Martinez argued, 'I'm an artist and I'm a provocative artist. It's my job to be provocative.' Discussing the issue in The Guardian, Matt Trueman concluded, 'Shouldn't these men be called to account for their actions? I still maintain that Martinez has done them wrong, but I'm also glad she acted in such a way. Ought theatre be constrained by ethical considerations? It's often where artists overstep the mark that it becomes most fascinating.'

== Free Admission ==
Martinez's next show, in 2016, was another confessional, called Free Admission ('a pun on the fact that I freely admit things'). In the show, she talked about social media, feminism, anal hygiene, the playground racism of 1970s singing games, her father's death in hospital and the failing NHS, and her mother's escape from the Spanish Civil War as a three-year-old. While revealing herself through stories, Martinez built a literal 'fourth wall', using cement and concrete blocks, between herself and the audience. She learned to do this by taking a bricklaying course: 'Saturday mornings in south London, me and 15 other fortysomething, slightly balding, slightly overweight, suburban heterosexual men looking to put a barbie in their back gardens. I didn't have the courage to tell them why I was there.'

Lyn Gardner reviewed Free Admission at the Soho Theatre: 'Almost every sentence begins with the words 'Sometimes I ...', which gives her words a provisional quality and means they can hang in the air like inscrutable Chinese proverbs. Gradually things take an urgent and darker tone, the laughter still bubbles but more uneasily as the wall rises and Martinez's words are lobbed over the top like unpinned grenades primed to explode.'.

Martinez has said that the show's starting point was her realisation that 'the word sometimes reinforces the idea that there is no absolute truth … that life isn’t fixed … that we are all prone to contradiction and all capable of change.'

== Wild Bore ==
In Wild Bore (2017), Martinez collaborated with two comedians, Zoë Coombs Marr, and Adrienne Truscott, to probe the culture of arts critics. They took quotes from genuine reviews each had received, 'twisting this found language into a stunning rebuke to their critics'.

Jane Howard described Wild Bore as 'a battle cry for not only stronger, more diverse criticism but also for the same strength and diversity on comedy stages. It is a joy to watch these artists claim their space so forcefully, to yell back at their critics so clearly, to ask everyone to simply be better....Wild Bore is the rally for supported, considered writing that we critics need. Or, maybe I'm just telling myself that to make myself feel better. Maybe this is all just what they wanted me to say. Am I nothing more than a cunning part of their dramaturgical design?'

== A Family Outing – 20 Years On ==
In 2019, Martinez set out to recreate her first ever show with A Family Outing - 20 Years On. She had to do this without her father, Arthur, who died in 2009, while her mother, Milagros Lea, with early stage dementia, could no longer remember her lines. In the recreation, mother and daughter sit side by side on a sofa, watching the original performance on a television set while it is simultaneously projected on a large screen for the audience. Lyn Gardner described it as 'a show marked by absence ...(and) by what time does to our bodies and our minds. It makes time tangible, something you can touch....In the original, Martinez is very much the daughter, now she is more like a parent to her own mother....Watching it in the company of my daughter, it made me think about my own family and those we have lost along the way, and because there is something deeply moving about seeing a show which has clearly cost its creator something more than just time and money.'

== Directing ==
While making her own shows, Martinez has also worked as a director. She was a mentor to the visual and performance artist Victoria Melody, helping her create her first theatre show, Northern Soul, in 2012. She has directed two hit shows for Lucy McCormick, Triple Threat (2017) and Post Popular (2019). In 2019, Martinez also directed Laura Murphy's Contra and Leah Shelton's Bitch on Heat. Reviewing Contra, Dorothy Max Prior found 'evidence of Ursula in the comic timing, the facial expressions, and – especially – in that little mouth-half-open, twinkly-eyed pause before the killer line.' In The Sydney Morning Herald's review of Bitch on Heat, Cameron Woodhead wrote that 'It was no surprise to discover British luminary Ursula Martinez directed the show. Bitch on Heat doesn't waste a single moment, possesses a rare sense of completeness and condenses Shelton's genius for performance art into stage magic – a lucid dream fuelled by a transfixing combination of fierce intellect, intense presence and bold, often acidic, physical comedy.'

== Duckie ==
Martinez is an associate artist with Duckie, the 'post gay' performance collective, with whom she has collaborated on numerous projects over 20 years. In 2002 she co-created Duckie's C'est Vauxhall, originally staged at the Vauxhall Tavern, and renamed C'est Barbican when it transferred there during Christmas 2003. The show won the 2004 Olivier award for Best Entertainment. Renamed C'est Duckie, it subsequently toured to Manchester, Birmingham, Edinburgh, Sydney, Berlin, Tokyo, Kyoto and New York.
