= Michelle Matlock =

American actress

Michelle Nicole Matlock is a professional American clown and former "struggling actress", best known for playing the lead romantic role as the ladybug in OVO, the twenty-fifth annual traveling production of Cirque du Soleil.

== Biography ==
Matlock was born and raised in Washington state. While visiting New York City from college in 1994 her taxicab was stuck in traffic behind a gay rights demonstration. She describes joining the march at the spur of the moment as a life-changing experience that convinced her to quit school and remain in New York. She soon won a scholarship to the National Shakespeare Conservatory, where she studied classical Shakespearean acting. She was juggling in Washington Square Park one day after graduating from theater school, when she was spotted by a talent scout for a clowning program being developed by the Royal Caribbean Cruise Line. She spent the next year studying and performing clowning, juggling, and stilt-walking on cruise ships, after her friend convinced her to take the job. Matlock worked on-and-off as a clown for the next five years with the Bindlestiff Family Cirkus, the Daredevil Opera Company, the queer social justice circus troupe Circus Amok's "Circus Inferno" project, and at the Big Apple Circus, in a program performing for hospitals.

As an actress Matlock worked for several small regional theater companies. In 2001 she developed a solo show, The Mammy Project. After the show was picked up in 2005 by Performance Space 122 her show toured extensively throughout the United States at colleges and festivals, making her a celebrity in her field. Inspired by Nancy Green, hired for the 1893 World's Fair as the first actress to play Aunt Jemima, the show explores stereotypes of black women, and has toured the United States extensively. Despite the wide exposure she was "struggling" as an actress, and says she was not able to afford to pay to attend the circus, even though her clowning was a higher paying job in New York than acting.

Matlock's connection with Cirque du Soleil began in 2004 when an employee of the circus saw her solo act and invited her to audition in Seattle. She was one of the four finalists out of fifty clowns auditioned but was rejected and told they were not sure how they could use her.

In OVO Matlock plays a ladybug, the "aviation-challenged" romantic lead of the show. Once OVO was converted from the Grand Chapiteau into Arena format in 2015 however, Michelle left the tour.
