= Duckie (group) =

Duckie is a "queer nightlife collective". They produce a mix of so-called "cultural interventions", such as club nights, new-mode pop, burlesque and performance events, as well as anti-theatre experimentation. They have described their work as "mixing the arthouse with the dosshouse" and putting "highbrow performance in backstreet pubs and lowbrow performance in posh theatres".

Supported by grants from the British Council and Arts Council England, Duckie is based in London but has played in Berlin, Germany, Greece and Tokyo as well as the Edinburgh Festival Fringe, Blackpool Tower Ballroom and the Sydney Opera House.

Duckie's work is characterised by its engagement with the queer lifestyle and community, showcasing queer performers and performance art at its weekly Saturday club night and providing "a creative forum for alternative gay and lesbian performance and culture".

Duckie's aesthetic has been described as “progressive working class entertainment”, while critics have linked its short, scandalous acts to music hall and noted its alternative to more commercial gay nightlife.

== Background ==
Duckie began as a club night in November 1995 in the south London pub Royal Vauxhall Tavern (RVT), created by producer Simon Casson (aka Simon Strange), host Amy Lamé, DJs the London Readers Wifes, and Jay Cloth and Father Cloth on the doors.

In a 2007 article for Time Out, Paul Burston wrote that at the start of Duckie's tenure the RVT was somewhat in decline: "Lack of investment meant the venue remained dark during the week, only coming to life at the weekend with Duckie and ... the Dame Edna Experience." Burston also records that the opening of the gay nightclub Crash promoted Vauxhall's potential for hosting such ventures, leading to an influx of mainstream clubs into the historic gay area.

Despite this, and the potential in new audiences attracted by the larger clubs, Duckie's growth was again challenged in 1998 when Lambeth London Borough Council and property developer CLS Holdings attempted to flatten the RVT to make way for a supermarket complex. Duckie was instrumental in defeating this threat: as Burston notes "The performance club Duckie, which had breathed new life into Saturday nights, mounted a vigorous press campaign, protesting outside Lambeth Town Hall and saving it from the bulldozers." In 2005, businessmen Paul Oxley and James Lindsay bought the RVT at public auction, bringing new investment to the venue and securing the site as a bar and nightclub.

== Club nights ==
For most of its first 27 years, Duckie ran on Saturday nights at the Royal Vauxhall Tavern. Its format combined live art and cabaret with DJ sets by the Readers Wifes, while Amy Lamé hosted the night and Jay Cloth and Father Cloth worked the door. Ben Walters, writing in The Guardian, described the RVT as Duckie's "spiritual home" and said the night helped make the venue "London's home of alternative queer performance".

After the pandemic closure, Azara Meghie took over from Lamé as host of Duckie at the RVT.

Duckie's regular Saturday-night residency at the RVT ended on 2 July 2022. From August 2022, Duckie moved to another Vauxhall LGBTQ+ venue, Eagle London, where Time Out reported that it would run every Saturday as a daytime party, with cabaret, DJ sets and Meghie as compere.The Eagle events continued into 2024.

In 2026, Duckie returned as Duckie 7/11, an early-evening event at St Paul's Church Hall in Stoke Newington. Time Out reported that the new version would run from 7pm to 11pm, with a cheap bar, buffet and cups of tea.

Performers associated with Duckie's club nights and related shows have included Ursula Martinez, Marisa Carnesky, Kit Green, Miss High Leg Kick, Scottee, H Plewis, Liz Carr and Travis Alabanza.

== Gay Shame ==
From 1996, Duckie has produced Gay Shame as an annual event timed to coincide with Gay Pride. The Guardian described Gay Shame as a deliberately contentious counterpoint to commercialised Pride celebrations, quoting host Amy Lamé as saying that the event had "always been a counterpoint to the rainbow-flag, tight-T-shirt culture of Pride”. The event expanded beyond the Royal Vauxhall Tavern in the 2000s; in 2004 it moved to the 2,000-capacity Coronet, while later editions included larger themed performance events such as Gay Shame Goes Macho and Gay Shame Goes Girly. After the regular series ended in 2019, Duckie revived Gay Shame in 2022 as Straight Pride/Gay Shame, which Time Out described as an irreverent alternative to London's mainstream Pride celebrations.

In May, 2025, Duckie announced that the 2025 Gay Shame ('The Dirty Thirty') would be the Readers Wifes last Duckie gig.

== Performance events ==
In December 2002, Duckie's C'est Vauxhall Christmas show at the Royal Vauxhall Tavern created the format of sitting guests at tables and offering them the chance to order short acts, using "Duckie dollars", from a menu. In December 2003, this was recreated as C'est Barbican at The Pit theatre venue at the Barbican Centre. It won four awards including an Olivier Award for best entertainment show and returned to the Barbican in 2004. The show toured to the Sydney Opera House as well as Berlin, Thessaloniki, Birmingham and Manchester. In December 2007, this show was recreated as C'est Duckie! at the Clemente Soto Velez Cultural and Educational Center, on New York City's Lower East Side.

In 2006, Duckie created The Class Club at The Pit, a piece of event theatre that asked the audience to pre-select a social class for themselves, dress appropriately for the evening and then enjoy a meal and entertainment for their chosen grouping.

Duckie continued its Barbican Christmas collaborations with Office Party in 2007, an interactive show devised by Kit Green and Ursula Martinez with director Cal McCrystal.

In 2011, Duckie staged Lullaby at the Barbican's Pit, an overnight sleepover performance in which audience members were given beds in the theatre and breakfast the following morning. Reviewing the show for The Guardian, Lyn Gardner described the work as memorable for its surreal detail and for making the sleeping audience part of the spectacle.

Later that year, Duckie returned to the Barbican with Copyright Christmas, a promenade performance set in a satirical superstore and focused on Christmas consumerism. Gardner wrote that the show turned Duckie's Christmas format toward shopping and branded culture, with the audience cast as customers in a large warehouse-like retail environment.

== Community and participatory arts projects ==
In 2011, Duckie became an Arts Council England National Portfolio Organisation. While continuing to produce the club nights it also began multiple projects engaging specific groups and communities through participatory performance and social events.

Duckie developed The Posh Club, a daytime performance and social club for over-60s combining afternoon tea, cabaret, dancing and volunteer waiters in formal dress. The project has been covered as part of wider reporting on efforts to address loneliness and social isolation among older people.

Another project was The Slaughterhouse Club, an arts-based project for homeless and vulnerable Londoners experiencing alcohol and addiction issues.

In 2025 Duckie staged Rat Park, a sober daytime project addressing chemsex, intimacy, mental health and loneliness among LGBTQ+ people. The Guardian described the project as a departure from Duckie's usual late-night format, combining discussion, performance and community gathering during LGBT+ History Month.
