= Boyz (magazine) =

London-based magazine targeted at the LGBT community

Boyz Magazine
- Editor: David Bridle
- Categories: Gay
- Frequency: Weekly
- Founded: 1991
- Company: Chartwell Publishers Ltd
- Country: United Kingdom
- Based in: London
- Language: English
- Website: www.boyz.co.uk
- ISSN: 1750-7944

Boyz was a free, London-based magazine targeted at gay men and the LGBTQ communities. It was distributed mainly through gay bars, pubs, clubs shops and saunas in the United Kingdom. In July 2019 Boyz moved from a weekly to a monthly frequency of publication with its August edition, its first monthly issue. Boyz focused on news, features and photospreads about the gay scene. Boyz website has now been replaced by DirtyBoyz.

== History ==
Boyz was founded by David Bridle and Kelvin Sollis in 1991. It was based in London.

The first "dummy" edition of Boyz magazine was distributed by Kelvin Sollis, David Bridle and friends at Gay Pride in June 1991. The first full edition of Boyz was published on Thursday 4 July 1991 and distributed to gay venues in London. David Bridle was its first editor. Other editors included Simon Gage (1993 - 1998), David Hudson (1998 - 2006) and Stuart Brumfitt (2007 - 2011). More recently Luke Till edited the title.

Boyz format at launch was tabloid-size newsprint with some pages in colour, published weekly. Content included naked pin ups, contact ads, an Agony Uncle and articles about coming out, relationships and gay sex - as well as editorial coverage of the gay scene. The printing format changed to an A4 size full colour magazine in 2001.

In 2007, Boyz was re-designed and relaunched. Most of the sexually explicit content was removed and the magazine increased news and social scene coverage. Adverts for male escorts and erotic phonelines were dropped in 2008.

In July 2019 Boyz switched to become a free monthly publication.

In November 2020, Boyz attracted some criticism after the magazine's Twitter account repeatedly retweeted the advocacy group LGB Alliance, which has been condemned by some LGBT people such as Matt Lucas as transphobic. Several club events and Pride in London subsequently ended their support for the magazine. The magazine subsequently apologised, but in January 2021, there was further criticism after the editor wrote a comment piece for Spiked saying that the Terrence Higgins Trust's decision to withdraw advertising from the magazine over the controversy was a 'witch-hunt'.

By 2024 Boyz had ceased publication, but the website used was taken over by a pornography blog and news service called Dirtyboyz.
