= David Straitjacket =

- Born: July 1977
- Origin: Oldham, England
- Occupation(s): Escapologist; Comedian; Entertainer
- Years active: 1993–present
- Website: MySpace page

David Straitjacket (born July 1977), is a British escape artist most notable for his television appearances, and world record attempts.

== Biography and history ==
He was born in Oldham, Greater Manchester, but grew up in nearby Ashton-under-Lyne, and began performing in the circus as a juggler at the age of 16. Following that he founded his own circus in which he performed as an acrobat, tightrope walker and trapeze artist. In 1999 he returned to his first love of escapology and sideshow performance, developing his own daredevil escapology style, for which he is now well known; this both amongst other escapologists, and by the public as a whole. He is the featured artist in this year's "Ripley's Believe It Or Not" book, and is currently filming his own one-hour television special. He is also notable as one of the few sword swallowers in the world. The current number of real life sword swallowers is estimated to be around 75.

He recently appeared on the hit British television series The New Paul O'Grady Show where he set a new Guinness world record. He also trained TV personalities Ant & Dec in the art of rope escapes, and worked as a technical advisor for the reality TV show Big Brother 7. He appeared as a teacher in the CBBC reality TV show, The Sorcerers Apprentice, on 25 October 2009.

David Straitjacket is a vegan, and in 2008 was shortlisted for the 'Best Vegan Entertainer' award.

== World record achievements ==
- World's Fastest Straitjacket Escape
- World's Fastest Underwater Handcuff Escape
- World's Fastest Handcuff Escape
- World's Fastest Straitjacket Escape Whilst Balanced On Stilts
- World's Fastest Suspended Straitjacket & Chains Escape
- Having The Heaviest Person Stand On His Chest, While Lying On Broken Glass
