= Fliegende Bauten Hamburg =

Theatre in Hamburg

Coordinates: 53°33′07″N 9°58′18″E

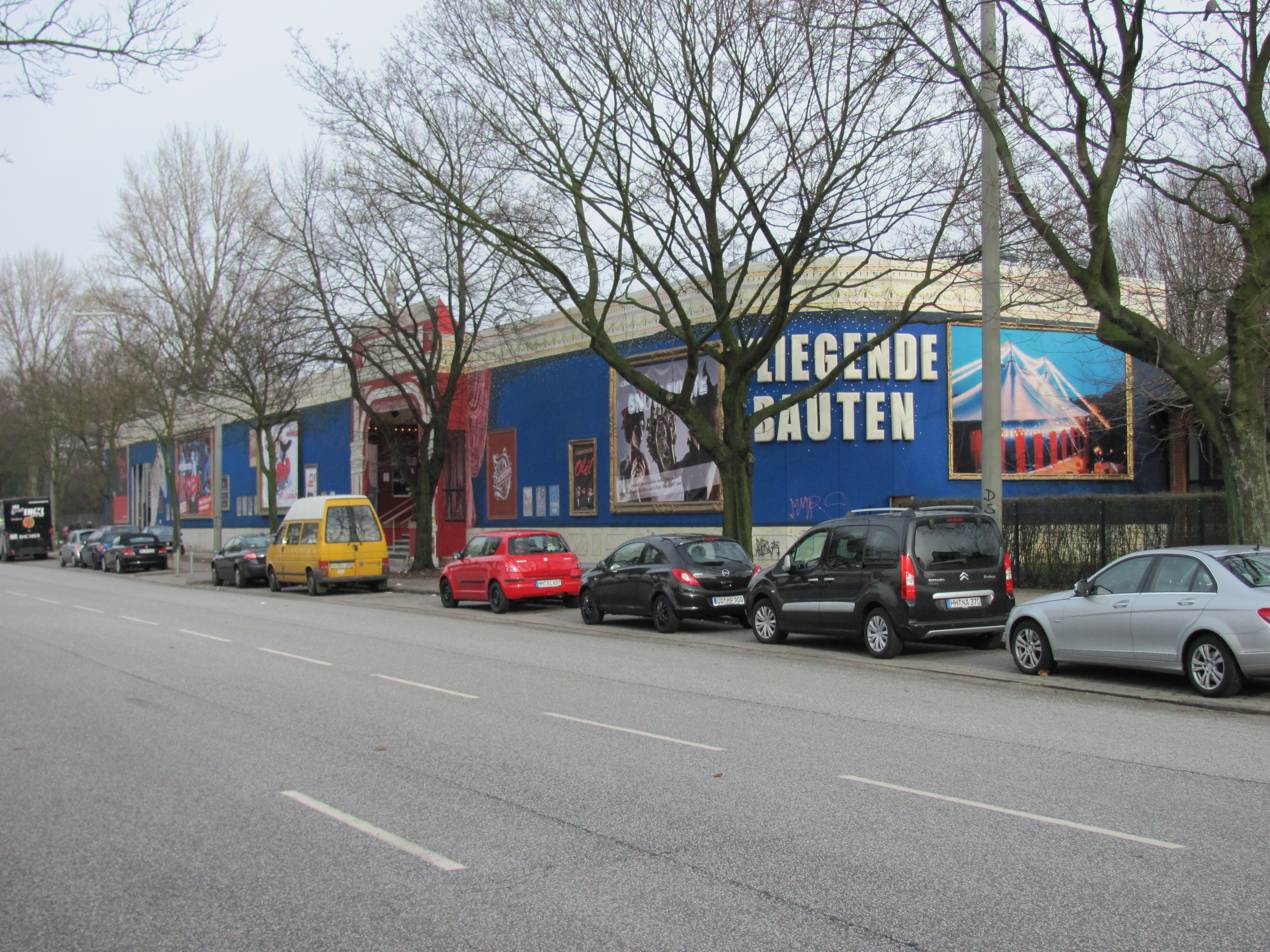
- Theater Fliegende Bauten in Hamburg, Germany
- Interactive map of Fliegende Bauten Hamburg
- Location: Hamburg, Germany
- Type: Theatre

Fliegende Bauten Hamburg is a theatre in Hamburg, Germany.
