= Jonathan Allen (artist) =

English artist (born 1966)

- Born: 1966 (age 59–60)
- Occupations: Visual artist writer magician
- Years active: 1991–present
- Known for: Visual Artist and Magician
- Website: jonathanallen.info

Jonathan Allen (born 1966) is a visual artist, writer, and magician based in London. His performance persona "Tommy Angel", is a fictitious evangelist and magician satirising the genre of Gospel Magic, who Allen portrays in a variety of media including performance, photography, video, and writing.

== Life and work ==
Allen was born in 1966 in the United Kingdom. He received a Fine Art MA from Chelsea College of Art in 1989 and was a Henry Moore Fellow at Sheffield Hallam University from 1991 to 1993. From 2007 to 2008 he was the Arts Council England Helen Chadwick Fellow at the University of Oxford and the British School at Rome.

Allen's work has appeared in many exhibitions including "Feint" at Deutsche Bank in New York City, "The Float in the Sight of Things" at Ferens Art Gallery in Hull, "Mesmer" at temporarycontemporary in London, "Con Art" at Site Gallery in Sheffield, "Scarecrow" in Metzova Greece, and "Variety" at the De La Warr Pavilion Bexhill on Sea, UK, the first Singapore Biennale , "The Dictionary of War" in Berlin, "Kalanag" at David Risley Gallery London, "The Great Transformation – Art & Tactical Magic" at Frankfurter Kunstverein, and "Adventureland Golf" at the Grundy Art Gallery Hull, "Explode Every Day" at the Massachusetts Museum of Contemporary Art MASS MoCA, "Twenty-First-Century Silks" at Ryan Lee Gallery, New York, "The Act of Magic", STUK – House for Dance & Image, Leuven, and “Illusions Are Real” for Manif d'art 10 – La biennale de Québec.

In 2002, Allen instigated the international group show "Con Art" with American curator Helen Varola and Carol Maund which explored art and conjuring's shared principles of 'cunning and conning' through a gallery exhibition (including Mark Wallinger, Simon Patterson, Sarah Charlesworth, and others), a symposium (chaired by Susan Hiller), and a live performance event including, amongst others, Forced Entertainment, Ursula Martinez, and Tommy Angel. In 2010, he co-curated the Hayward Gallery touring exhibition "Magic Show" with the writer Sally O'Reilly.

Allen has written widely on art and cultural history for visual art journals including Contemporary, Tate Etc., The Burlington Magazine, The Brooklyn Rail, and Cabinet Magazine, for which he guest-edited an issue dedicated to magic in 2007. He is a member of The Magic Circle, the UK organisation for professional magicians, and a curator at The Magic Circle Museum. In 2013 Allen identified a previously unknown tarot deck within the museum's collections hand-painted c.1906 by the English artist and mystic Austin Osman Spare. He subsequently edited the first critical survey of Spare's cards. In 2025, Allen co-curated the exhibition “Tarot – Origins & Afterlives” at the Warburg Institute, London.

=== Tommy Angel ===
Tommy Angel is the name of a fictional 'gospel magician' who features in some of Allen's photographic and performance work. Angel, who has been described as "Billy Graham meeting David Copperfield via Donald Rumsfeld", satirises the evangelical entertainment form known as Gospel Magic.

Large black-and-white photographic images depicting Tommy Angel, were exhibited at The De La Warr Pavilion, Bexhill on Sea, UK (2005), David Risely Gallery (2006), and Singapore Biennale (2006). Allen has performed the persona of Tommy Angel in a diverse contexts including cabaret venues, church halls, and art galleries, including the Hayward Gallery on the occasion of Eyes, Lies and Illusions, and in 2006 at Tate Britain, as well as the ZOO Art Fair.

A fake dollar bill bearing the face of Tommy Angel and various parodic evangelistic slogans was introduced into public circulation (via pickpockets using their skills in reverse) during the 1st Singapore Biennale in 2006.

Between 2004 and 2006, British singer-songwriter Paloma Faith was Allen's co-performer, appearing alongside Tommy Angel under the stage name 'Miss Direction'. Tommy Angel was the subject of a feature article in the Las Vegas-published Magic in February 2006.
