= Bindlestiff Family Cirkus =

Circus performance group

The Bindlestiff Family Cirkus was founded in 1995 by Keith Nelson and Stephanie Monseu. Initially, the duo was named Fireplay. They toured the world with a mix of circus and sideshow. In 1999, the company became a non-profit organization incorporated as Bindlestiff Family Variety Arts, Inc.

== Shows ==
Beginning in 2001, the Cirkus produced full-length theatrical productions, including "Buckaroo Bindlestiff's Wild West Gender Bender Jamboree" (2001), "High Heels and Red Noses" (2003), and "From the Gutter to the Glitter: A Night Out with the Bindlestiffs" (2005), directed by Michael Preston.

They also produced several editions of the Cavalcade of Youth, a showcase for performers 21 years of age and under.

== The Palace of Variety ==
In 2002, the company converted a defunct shoe store just off Times Square into a performance space called The Palace of Variety and a museum called The Free Museum of Times Square. During the following seasons, The Palace of Variety became the focal point of variety arts in New York City. As many as fifteen shows per week featured the Bindlestiff Family Cirkus and other performing artists. Acts included plays, sideshow exhibitions, burlesque shows and a flea circus. The Free Museum of Times Square showcased the area's history. They were forced to close in February 2004 due to the planned demolition of the building.

== Company members ==
Mainstay performers include founders Keith Nelson and Stephanie Monseu, keyboardist Raja Azar, aerialist and trapeze artist Tanya Gagné, lasso artist and rope-spinner Angelo Iodice, clown Christine Duenas, musician Peter Bufano, clown Matthew Morgan, juggler Adam Kuchler, drummer Tim Hoey, flea circus impresario and clown Adam Gertsacov, magician Magic Brian, daredevil clown Jonah Logan, insectivore and magician Tanya Solomon, and magician MC Scotty the Blue Bunny. Other members have included Sxip Shirey.
