= Amy Saunders =

British born producer, performer, comedian, and curator

Amy Saunders also known as Miss Behave, is a British-born producer, performer, comedian and curator. She is a self-taught sword swallower and performs in cabarets.

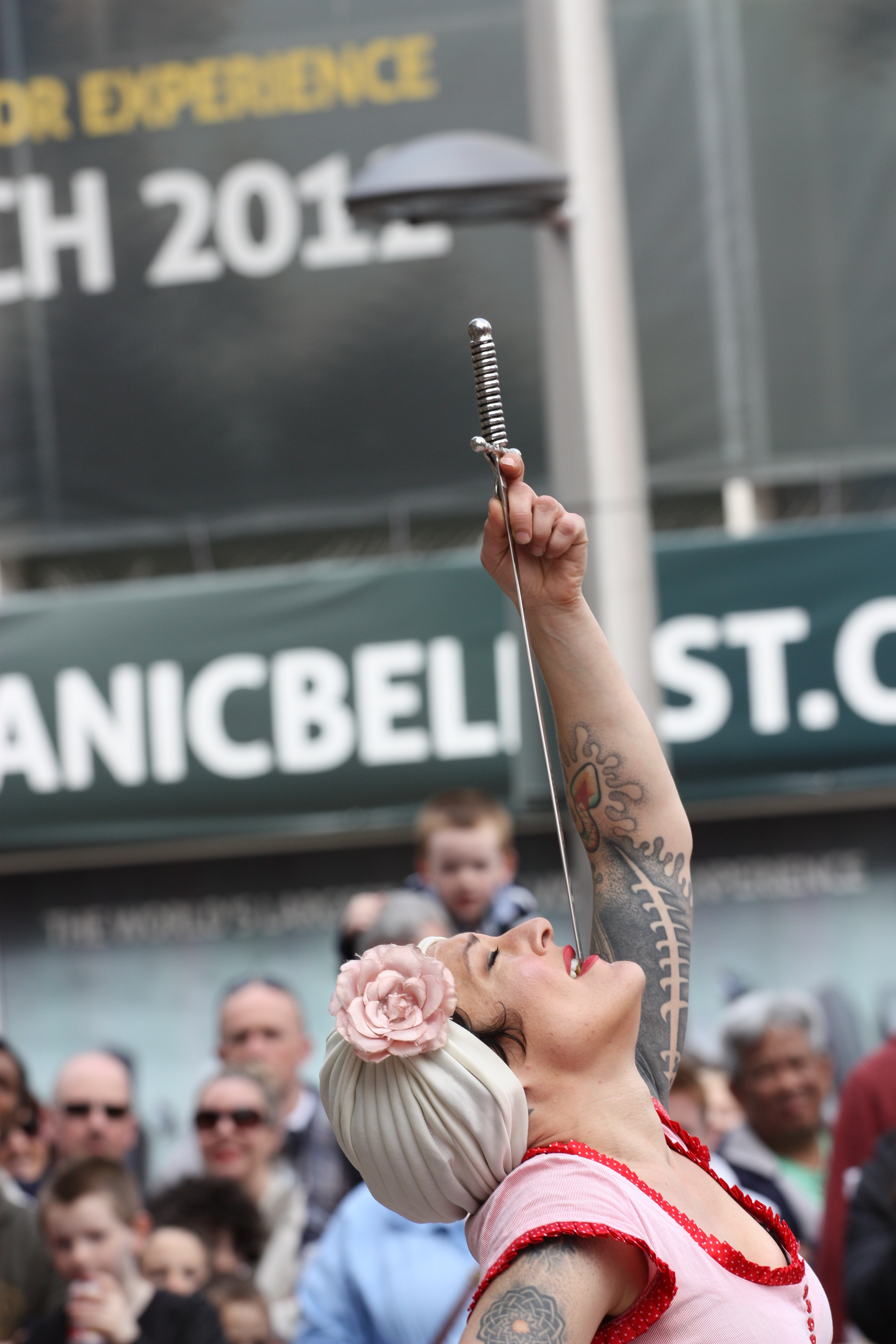
Miss Behave sword swallowing in Belfast.

== Career ==
Saunders began her career as a sword swallower and later became known as an emcee, cabaret performer, and producer of live variety shows.. She has broken the Guinness world record for most swords swallowed by a woman three times. She first broke the record by swallowing five swords in London on 28 April 1999. She then swallowed six swords on the set of El Show de los Récords in Madrid on 27 November 2001. On 11 September 2004, she swallowed seven swords in London.

Saunders first began sword-swallowing while busking in bars in the West End of London in 1996. She started performance life in fetish clubs and then moved to freak shows as a sword swallower.

Since 2001, Saunders has been performing under the stage name of Miss Behave. She has been compared to Betty Boop and Marlene Dietrich, called "a live cartoon with a late night attitude." Industry website This Is Cabaret said that she "... imprints the evening with unapologetic raciness and sardonic mockery. Aggressive and confrontational, she always has a quick riposte to call your bluff."

== Producer ==
Saunders has produced her own variety shows since 2008. She has created The Crack, Miss Behave's Variety Nighty, Miss Behave's Social Club, Pleasure Aid and Miss Behave's Game Show. Saunders created The Miss Behave Game Show, an interactive production first developed at the Adelaide Fringe in 2014. The show subsequently toured internationally and ran in Las Vegas at Bally’s from 2016 until its closure in March 2020 due to the COVID-19 pandemic, during which time it was also performed at Melbourne’s Midsumma Festival. Following the shutdown, Saunders continued to stage versions of the show in Las Vegas, with performances at Majestic Repertory Theatre as live entertainment resumed. The production was later adapted for performance aboard ships operated by Virgin Voyages, where it continues as an audience-participation game show format. In Variety Nighty, she incorporated Statler and Waldorf characters as in-house hecklers. Following the closure of The Miss Behave Game Show, Saunders shifted her focus to downtown Las Vegas, where she collaborated with Ryan Doherty’s Corner Bar Management and developed a new variety production. In 2022, she created Miss Behave's Mavericks, which debuted at the Cheapshot venue on Fremont Street as a fast-paced, continuously evolving variety show featuring a rotating lineup of performers across comedy, circus, music, and cabaret disciplines, with Saunders serving as host and curator. The production was later expanded into a larger-scale residency at the Plaza Hotel & Casino showroom in downtown Las Vegas opening in 2024.
