= La Clique =

Cabaret show

La Clique logo

La Clique is a cabaret / variety show first conceived for the 2004 season of The Edinburgh Festival Fringe, and today staged in several other cities in the UK, Australia, Singapore, and North America.

== History ==
La Clique, a live entertainment show, was first conceived for the 2004 season of the Edinburgh Festival Fringe by David Bates.

It was originally performed in The Famous Spiegeltent with a small circular stage at fringe festivals, but since 2008 it was also performed for extended periods in permanent theatres keeping the same characteristic stage.

== Today ==
As of 2025, La Clique is also staged in London, Melbourne, Adelaide, Sydney, Brighton, Singapore, Montreal, and New York City.

== Awards ==
- 2009: Winner, Laurence Olivier Award for Best Entertainment for the London 2008/09 season at the Hippodrome, London
- 2005: Winner, Brighton Festival Fringe, Best of The Fringe Festival
- 2010: Nominated, La Meilleure Comédie Musicale 2009 (Best Musical or Comedy) in the Les Globes de Cristal (for the Paris 2009 season)

== Notable performers ==
Notable performers have included:

- Guinness World Record-breaking contortionist Captain Frodo
- Australian actress, dancer and cabaret performer Meow Meow
- British performer and self-taught sword swallower Miss Behave
- Irish musician, vocalist, German Cabaret singer Bernie Dieter
- Irish singer and actress Camille O'Sullivan (since 2004)
