= David Pugh (theatre producer) =

British theatre producer

David Pugh (born 14 May 1959) is a West End and Broadway theatre producer.

Born in Stoke-on-Trent in 1959, Pugh agreed with his parents to train as a drama teacher, and, at the start of his career, was a theatre producer three days a week and a supply teacher in Hackney in London for four days a week.

Between 1996 and 2019 Pugh produced a number of important plays in the UK and worldwide with his production partner, Dafydd Rogers.

David Pugh and Dafydd Rogers first produced 'Art' (1996) by Yasmina Reza, translated by Christopher Hampton, starring Albert Finney, Tom Courtenay and Ken Stott at the Wyndhams Theatre in the West End of London. It subsequently ran for eight years with twenty-six cast changes, winning the Evening Standard Theatre Award and the Olivier Award.

The production of 'Art' starring Alan Alda, Victor Garber and Alfred Molina opened on Broadway in 1998 at the Royale Theatre, winning the Tony Award for Best Play.

Pugh and Rogers produced the jukebox musical The Blues Brothers, which played in London's West End for four separate seasons, toured throughout the world for fifteen years and was nominated for an Olivier Award for Best Entertainment.

Pugh and Rogers produced The Play What I Wrote by Hamish McColl and Sean Foley, directed by Kenneth Branagh at the Wyndham's Theatre, which won the Laurence Olivier Award for Best New Comedy. It opened at the Lyceum Theatre on Broadway and was nominated for the Tony Award for Best Special Theatrical Event.

This was followed by Tom Stoppard's adaptation of Gérald Sibleyras' play Heroes starring Richard Griffiths, John Hurt and Ken Stott at the Wyndham's Theatre in 2005, which also won the Olivier Award for Best New Comedy.

Pugh and Rogers then produced Equus in London's West End, which starred Richard Griffiths and Daniel Radcliffe and played a sell-out season at the Gielgud Theatre.

The production of God of Carnage by Yasmina Reza, again translated by Christopher Hampton, played at the Gielgud Theatre and starred Ralph Fiennes, Tamsin Greig, Janet McTeer and Ken Stott, also won the Olivier Award for Best New Comedy.

In 2008 Pugh and Rogers originated and produced Kneehigh Theatre's production of Noël Coward's Brief Encounter, which played in an old cinema on the Haymarket in London and at Studio 54 on Broadway following a season at St. Ann's Warehouse in New York. The UK tour subsequently won the TMA Award for Best Touring Production 2009.

God of Carnage opened on Broadway at the Jacobs Theatre in 2009 starring James Gandolfini, Marcia Gay Harden, Jeff Daniels and Hope Davis, winning Pugh and Rogers another Tony Award. Subsequent casts included Lucy Liu and Jimmy Smits.

Pugh and Rogers' production of Calendar Girls by Tim Firth, opened in 2009 in London's West End and became the most successful UK touring play of all time, grossing over 35 million pounds and winning the Whatsonstage Theatre Award.

Deathtrap by Ira Levin followed in 2010 at London's Noël Coward Theatre starring Simon Russell Beale, Jonathan Groff and Claire Skinner, where it played for a five-month season.

On 2 February 2013, Pugh and Rogers' production of a new play adaptation of the film The Full Monty by its original writer, Simon Beaufoy, opened at the Lyceum Theatre, Sheffield to enormous critical success, and followed by a tour of the UK and Ireland which continued through until May 2019 having won the UK Theatre Award for Best Touring Production

Pugh and Rogers' new musical, The Girls, by Gary Barlow and Tim Firth was tried out at Leeds Grand Theatre and The Lowry, Manchester, where it received five star reviews and broke box office records. The Girls opened in London's West End, where it ran for six months and now, retitled Calendar Girls The Musical, the production has embarked on a 60-week national tour.

The Band, the Take That musical, written by Tim Firth and co-produced by Pugh and Rogers with Take That, opened at Manchester Opera House in September 2017, becoming the fastest selling musical of all time and received rave reviews and toured very successfully throughout the United Kingdom until March 2019, including a season at the Theatre Royal Haymarket in London's West End.

Just prior to the COVID-19 pandemic, Pugh and Rogers had produced a highly acclaimed production of Willy Russell's Educating Rita, which was curtailed by lockdown. But as soon as open air theatre was allowed, Pugh presented his production at the Minack Theatre in Cornwall, making worldwide news as at that time he was the only producer anywhere in the world producing a play.

He won the Olivier Award for his production of Pride and Prejudice* (*sort of) by Isobel McArthur after Jane Austen, at the Criterion Theatre in London's West End in 2021. The critically acclaimed production subsequently broke box office records around the UK.

Most recently, Pugh produced Willy Russell's Shirley Valentine, starring Sheridan Smith, at the Duke of York's Theatre in London's West End. During the 16-week season from February 2023 until June 2023 every seat and every standing place was sold at every performance, and the show was nominated for the Olivier Award for Best Revival and Best Actress for Sheridan Smith.

== Credits ==
West End

- The Blues Brothers
- Art
- The Play What I Wrote
- Heroes (2005)
- Ducktastic (2005)
- Equus (2007)
- Brief Encounter (2008)
- God of Carnage (2008)
- Calendar Girls (2009)
- Deathtrap (2010)
- The Full Monty (2013)
- The Girls (2017)
- The Band (2018)
- Pride and Prejudice* (*sort of) (2021)
- Shirley Valentine (2023)

Broadway

- Art
- The Play What I Wrote
- God of Carnage

Tours

- The Blues Brothers
- Art
- Rebecca
- The Play What I Wrote
- Calendar Girls
- Brief Encounter
- The Full Monty
- A Passionate Woman
- The Band
- Calendar Girls The Musical
- Educating Rita
- Charlie and Stan (2021)
- Pride and Prejudice* (*sort of) (2022–2023)
