= Dafydd Rogers =

Welsh theatre producer

- Born: 5 May 1969; London
- Awards: Olivier Award, 1997, Art, Best New Comedy, Producer Tony Award, 1998, Art, Best play, Producer Olivier Award, 2001, The Play What I wrote, Best Comedy, Producer Olivier Awards, 2006, Heroes, Best New Comedy, Producer Olivier Award, 2008, God Of Carnage, Best New Play, Producer TMA Award, 2009, Brief Encounter, Best Touring Production, Producer Tony Award, 2009, God of Carnage, Best Play, Producer

Dafydd Rogers is a theatre producer known for a number of award winning plays produced in the UK and internationally. and for his commitment to making theatre as accessible and affordable as possible. He is a long-standing board member of the Society of London Theatre and the UK Theatre Association.

== Early life and education ==
Dafydd Rogers was born in London. He was a Royal Chorister and soloist at Hampton Court Palace and attended St Paul's School Barnes, on a McAlpine scholarship. At St. Paul's he was vice Captain of school, Rowing 1st VIII (competing twice at Henley Royal Regatta) and Secretary of Boats, Rugby 1st XV, President of Literary Society, and Lupton Divinity Prize Winner. Rogers subsequently spent a year in Peru working on construction projects in brick and traditional adobe in Lima and Ayaviri. In 1988, Rogers attended King's College London to read theology. At KCL he was Captain of Boats.

He continues to row and coach at Erith Rowing Club in South East London.

== Career ==
Rogers' first job in theatre was at the Aldwych Theatre. He was an usher in the evening and sat on stage door in the mornings. Shows held there while he was there included Big Friendly Giant, Cotton Club and The Rise and Fall of Little Voice.

He left the Aldwych Theatre in April 1992, to be the theatre manager of Regent's Park Open Air Theatre.

In January 1993, he moved to the Royal Court Theatre in Sloane Square to be the theatre manager. He started Single's Nights and introduced pre-show events with playwrights and authors.

In September 1995, he was made general manager of the Shaftesbury Theatre in the West End. In October 1996, he was made the general manager of the Playhouse Theatre in the West End.

Rogers and David Pugh were introduced by a mutual friend Andrew Welch who thought that they would work well together; for twenty-three years they were probably the most successful independent duo producing in the UK.

Rogers and Pugh first produced 'Art' by Yasmina Reza, translated by Christopher Hampton, starring Albert Finney, Tom Courtenay and Ken Stott at the Wyndhams Theatre in the West End of London. It subsequently ran for eight years with twenty-six cast changes, winning the Evening Standard Theatre Award and the Olivier Award for Best Comedy.

Their production of the musical The Blues Brothers played in London's West End for four separate seasons, toured throughout the world for fifteen years and was nominated for The Olivier Award for Best Entertainment.

Rogers and Pugh also produced The Play What I Wrote by Hamish McColl and Sean Foley, directed by Kenneth Branagh at the Wyndham's Theatre, which won the Olivier Award for Best Comedy. It opened at the Lyceum Theatre on Broadway and was nominated for the Tony Award for Best Special Theatrical Event.

This was followed by Tom Stoppard's adaptation of Gérald Sibleyras' play Heroes starring Richard Griffiths, John Hurt and Ken Stott at the Wyndham's Theatre in 2005, which also won the Olivier Award for Best New Comedy.

This was followed by a successful touring production of Daphne du Maurier's Rebecca, starring Nigel Havers.

in 2007, Rogers and Pugh produced Equus in London's West End, which starred Griffiths and Daniel Radcliffe and played a sell-out season at the Gielgud Theatre.

Their production of God of Carnage by Yasmina Reza, again translated by Christopher Hampton, which played at the Gielgud Theatre and starred Ralph Fiennes, Tamsin Greig, Janet McTeer and Ken Stott, also won the Olivier Award for Best New Comedy.

In 2008 they originated and produced Kneehigh Theatre's production of Noël Coward's Brief Encounter, which played in an old cinema on the Haymarket in London and at Studio 54 on Broadway following a season at St Ann's Warehouse in New York. The UK tour subsequently won the TMA Award for Best Touring Production 2009.

God of Carnage opened on Broadway at the Jacobs Theatre in 2009 starring James Gandolfini, Marcia Gay Harden, Jeff Daniels and Hope Davis, winning Pugh and Rogers another Tony Award. Subsequent casts included Lucy Liu and Jimmy Smits.

Roger and Pugh's production of Calendar Girls by Tim Firth, opened in 2009 in London's West End and became the most successful UK touring play of the time, grossing over 35 million pounds and winning the WhatsOnStage Theatre Award

Deathtrap by Ira Levin followed in 2010 at London's Noël Coward Theatre starring Simon Russell Beale, Jonathan Groff and Claire Skinner, where it played for a five-month season.

On 2 February 2013, Rogers and Pugh's production of a new play adaptation of the film The Full Monty by its original writer, Simon Beaufoy, opened at the Lyceum Theatre, Sheffield to critical success and followed by a tour of the UK and Ireland which continued through until May 2019 having won the UK Theatre Award for Best Touring Production.

Rogers and Pugh's new musical The Girls, by Gary Barlow and Tim Firth was tried out at Leeds Grand Theatre and The Lowry Theatre, Manchester. The Girls opened in London's West End, where it ran for six months and now, retitled Calendar Girls The Musical, the production embarked on a 60-week national tour.

The Band, the Take That musical, written by Tim Firth and co-produced by Rogers and Pugh and Take That, opened at Manchester Opera House in September 2017 and toured successfully throughout the United Kingdom until March 2019, including a season at the Theatre Royal Haymarket in London's West End. This musical became the movie Greatest Days on which Pugh and Rogers were executive producers.

Just prior to the COVID-19 pandemic, Rogers and Pugh produced a highly acclaimed production of Willy Russell's Educating Rita, which was curtailed by lockdown. This proved to be the last production they produced together.

From 2020 to 2023 Rogers was executive director of the Cambridge Arts Theatre, brought in to manage operations during and after the COVID-19 pandemic as well as strategising the future capital plan.

In 2022 he was invited to the judging panel of "acclaimed industry experts" for the New Original Playwriting Awards hosted by Original Theatre.

In 2023 he became the executive director of Bretforton Grange and Theatrebarn, a charitable trust in Worcestershire, fourteen miles from Stratford-Upon-Avon.

== Theatre credits ==
- The Blues Brothers
- Art
- The Play What I Wrote
- Heroes (2005)
- Ducktastic (2005)
- Equus (2007)
- Brief Encounter (2008)
- God of Carnage (2008)
- Calendar Girls (2009)
- Deathtrap (2010)
- The Full Monty (2013)
- The Girls (2017)
- The Band (2018)

Broadway

- Art
- The Play What I Wrote
- God of Carnage

Tours

- The Blues Brothers
- Art
- Rebecca
- The Play What I Wrote
- Calendar Girls
- Brief Encounter
- The Full Monty
- A Passionate Woman
- The Band
- Calendar Girls The Musical
- Educating Rita
