= Drama Desk Award for Unique Theatrical Experience =

American theatre award

- Awarded for: Unique Theatrical Experience
- Location: New York City
- Country: United States
- Presented by: Drama Desk
- First award: 1975
- Currently held by: Burnout Paradise (2026)
- Website: dramadesk.org (defunct)

The Drama Desk Award for Unique Theatrical Experience is an annual award presented by Drama Desk in recognition of achievements in theatre across collective Broadway, off-Broadway and off-off-Broadway productions in New York City.

The category was first presented at the 1975 ceremony. Due to their unusual nature, these productions cannot be categorized in the regular plays or musicals categories.

== Winners and nominees ==
Key

and bold indicates the winner.

=== 1970s ===
Year	Production
1975
1975	**London Assurance**
1975	A Letter for Queen Victoria
1975	Bette Midler's Clams on the Half Shell Revue
1975	Flowers
1975	Saturday Sunday Monday
1975	The Charles Pierce Show
1975	The Rocky Horror Show
1975	Women Behind Bars
1976
1976	**The Norman Conquests**
1976	The Belle of Amherst
1976	Me and Bessie
1976	The Robber Bridegroom
1976	The Threepenny Opera
1976	Yentl
1977
1977	**No Man's Land**
1977	The Club
1977	Dylan Thomas Growing Up
1977	For Colored Girls Who Have Considered Suicide When the Rainbow Is Enuf
1977	Hold Me!
1977	Mummenschanz
1977	Nightclub Cantata
1977	Side by Side by Sondheim
1978
1978	**Miss Margarida's Way**
1978	The 2nd Greatest Entertainer
1978	Housewife Superstar
1978	Molière in Spite of Himself
1979
1979	**An Evening with Quentin Crisp**
1979	Bleacher Bums
1979	Streetsongs

=== 1980s ===
Year	Production
1980	—N/a
1981
1981	**Request Concert**
1981	Aaah Oui Genty!
1981	The Amazin' Casey Stengel
1981	Blackstone!
1981	Pericles
1981	Texts
1982
1982	**Whistler**
1982	Shiro
1983	—N/a
1984
1984	**La Tragedie de Carmen**
1984	The Gospel at Colonus
1984	Hey, Ma...Kaye Ballard
1984	Orgasmo Adulto Escapes from the Zoo
1984	Rockaby
1984	Secret Honor
1985
1985	**The Garden of Earthly Delights**
1985	The Golden Land
1985	The Normal Heart
1986
1986	**The Search for Signs of Intelligent Life in the Universe**
1986	Tango Argentino
1987, 1988	—N/a
1989
1989	**Largely New York**
1989	I'll Go On
1989	Saved from Obscurity

=== 1990s ===
Year	Production
1990	—N/a
1991
1991	**Cirque du Soleil: Nouvelle Expérience**
1992
1992	**Blue Man Group: Tubes**
1992	Lypsinka! A Day in the Life
1992	Pageant
1993
1993	**Fool Moon**
1993	Les Atrides
1994
1994	**Stomp**
1994	Ricky Jay and His 52 Assistants
1995, 1996	—N/a
1997
1997	**The Waste Land**
1997	The Beckett Plays
1997	Chimere
1997	The Three Lives of Lucie Cabrol
1997	yousaywhatimeanbutwhatyoumeanisnotwhatisaid
1998
1998	**Quidam**
1998	The Number 14
1998	Paul McKenna's Hypnotic World
1999
1999	**Swan Lake**
1999	De La Guarda
1999	Ennio
1999	Symphonie Fantastique
1999	The Umbilical Brothers - Thwack!

=== 2000s ===
Year	Production
2000
2000	**Charlie Victor Romeo**
2000	Do You Come Here Often?
2000	Shockheaded Peter
2001
2001	**Mnemonic**
2001	And God Created Great Whales
2001	The Laramie Project
2002	—N/a
2003
2003	**The Exonerated**
2003	The Play What I Wrote
2003	Russell Simmons Def Poetry Jam on Broadway
2003	Varekai
2004
2004	**Loud Mouth**
2004	Carnival Knowledge
2004	Ramayana 2K3
2005
2005	**Slava's Snowshow**
2005	all wear bowlers
2005	Belle Epoque
2005	The Mysteries
2005	Play Without Words
2005	Typo
2006
2006	**Christine Jorgensen Reveals**
2006	The Frog Bride
2006	Golden Dragon Acrobats
2006	Peer Gynt
2006	Rain
2006	The Stones
2007
2007	**Edward Scissorhands**
2007	Absinthe
2007	Amajuba: Like Doves We Rise
2007	Be
2007	Brundibér/But the Giraffe
2007	Hell House
2008
2008	**The 39 Steps**
2008	Between the Devil and the Deep Blue Sea
2008	Cut to the Chase
2008	Fabrik: The Legend of M. Rabinowitz
2008	Traces
2009
2009	**Celebrity Autobiography: In Their Own Words**
2009	Absinthe
2009	Arias with a Twist
2009	Désir
2009	Soul of Shaolin
2009	Surrender

=== 2010s ===
Year	Production	Ref.
2010
2010	**Love, Loss, and What I Wore**	
2010	Fêtes de la Nuit	
2010	Hansel and Gretel	
2010	John Tartaglia's ImaginOcean	
2010	The Provenance of Beauty	
2010	Stuffed and Unstrung	
2011
2011	**Sleep No More**	
2011	Being Harold Pinter	
2011	Circus Incognitus	
2011	Gatz	
2011	Play Dead	
2011	Room 17B	
2012
2012	**Gob Squad's Kitchen (You've Never Had It So Good)**	
2012	The Complete & Condensed Stage Directions of Eugene O'Neill, Vol. 1: Early Plays/Lost Plays	
2012	Give Me Your Hand	
2012	Noctu	
2012	The Ryan Case 1873	
2012	White	
2013
2013	**Cirque Du Soleil: Totem**	
2013	Bello Mania	
2013	Chris March's The Butt-Cracker Suite! A Trailer Park Ballet	
2013	The Fazzino Ride	
2013	The Man Who Laughs	
2013	That Play: A Solo Macbeth	
2014
2014	**Cirkopolis**	
2014	Charlatan	
2014	The Complete & Condensed Stage Directions of Eugene O'Neill Vol. 2	
2014	Mother Africa	
2014	Nothing to Hide	
2014	Nutcracker Rouge	
2015
2015	**Queen of the Night**	
2015	Catch Me!	
2015	Everybody Gets Cake	
2015	The Human Symphony	
2015	Rap Guide to Religion	
2016
2016	**That Physics Show**	
2016	ADA/AVA	
2016	Antigona (dance-theater, based on Sophocles' play Antigone)	
2016	The Very Hungry Caterpillar Show	
2016	YOUARENOWHERE	
2017
2017	**The Strange Undoing of Prudencia Hart**	
2017	CasablancaBox	
2017	The Ephemera Trilogy	
2017	The Paper Hat Game	
2018
2018	**Derren Brown: Secret**	
2018	Master	
2018	Say Something Bunny!	
2019
2019	**All is Calm: The Christmas Truce of 1914**	
2019	Love's Labour's Lost	
2019	The B-Side: "Negro Folklore from Texas State Prisons"	
2019	What to Send Up When It Goes Down	

=== 2020s ===
Year	Production	Ref.
2020
2020	**Is This A Room**	
2020	Beyond Babel	
2020	Feral	
2020	Midsummer: A Banquet	
2021	No awards: New York theatres shuttered, March 2020 to September 2021, due to the COVID-19 pandemic in New York City	
2022
2022	**Seven Deadly Sins**	
2023
2023	**Peter Pan Goes Wrong**	
2023	Asi Wind's Inner Circle	
2023	Plays for the Plague Year	
2023	Zephyr	
2024
2024	**Grenfell: in the words of survivors**	
2024	A Eulogy for Roman	
2024	A Simulacrum	
2024	ADRIFT: A Medieval Wayward Folly	
2024	I Love You So Much I Could Die	
2025
2025	**The Picture of Dorian Gray**	
2025	Odd Man Out	
2025	The 7th Voyage of Egon Tichy [redux]	
2025	The Voices in Your Head	
2025	The Wind and the Rain: A story about Sunny’s Bar	
2026
2026	**Burnout Paradise**	
2026	Amaze	
2026	Color Theories	
2026	ha ha ha ha ha ha ha	
2026	Rheology	
2026	Slanted Floors	

== See also ==
- Laurence Olivier Award for Best Entertainment
- Tony Award for Best Special Theatrical Event
