= Laurence Olivier Award for Best Family Show =

Annual award for London theatre

- Awarded for: Best Family Show
- Location: England
- Presented by: Society of London Theatre
- First award: 1991
- Currently held by: The Boy at the Back of the Class (2026)
- Website: officiallondontheatre.com/olivier-awards/

The Laurence Olivier Award for Best Family Show is an annual award presented by the Society of London Theatre in recognition of the "world-class status of London theatre." The awards were established as the Society of West End Theatre Awards in 1976, and renamed in 1984 in honour of English actor and director Laurence Olivier.

The award was introduced in 1991, as Best Entertainment, was renamed Best Entertainment and Family in 2012, and changed to its current name in 2020 – when "Entertainment" was moved to join Best Comedy Play on the renamed Best Entertainment or Comedy Play.

== Winners and nominees ==
=== 1990s ===
Year	Production	Writer
1991
1991	Five Guys Named Moe	Clarke Peters
1991	An Evening with Peter Ustinov	Peter Ustinov
1991	Victoria Wood Up West	Victoria Wood
1992
1992	Talking Heads	Alan Bennett
1992	A Tribute to the Blues Brothers	Con O'Neill
1992	Lavishly Mounted	Kit Hesketh-Harvey and Richard Sisson
1992	Tango Argentino	Claudio Segovia and Hector Orezzoli
1993
1993	Travels with My Aunt	Graham Greene and Giles Havergal
1993	Ennio Marchetto	Ennio Marchetto and Sosthen Hennekam
1993	The Blue Angel	Pam Gems
1993	The Invisible Man	Ken Hill
1994
1994	A Christmas Carol	Patrick Stewart
1994	Jamais Vu	Ken Campbell
1994	January Sale	Kit and The Widow
1994	Stomp	Luke Cresswell and Steve McNicholas
1995
1995	By Special Arrangement	Maria Friedman
1995	Fascinating Aïda	Dillie Keane, Adele Anderson and Issy Van Randwyck
1995	Juggle and Hyde	The Flying Karamazov Brothers
1995	Jack - A Night On the Town with John Barrymore	Nicol Williamson and Leslie Megahey
1998
1998	Slava's Snowshow	Slava Polunin
1998	Maureen Lipman, Live and Kidding	Maureen Lipman
1998	Marlene	Pam Gems
1998	She Knows You Know	Jean Fergusson
1999
1999	Do You Come Here Often?	The Right Size
1999	Much Ado About Everything	Jackie Mason
1999	Steve Coogan is the Man who Thinks He's It	Steve Coogan and Henry Normal
1999	Shakespeare's Villains: A Masterclass in Evil	Steven Berkoff

=== 2000s ===
Year	Production	Writer
2000
2000	Defending the Caveman	Rob Becker
2000	Al Murray - The Pub Landlord	Al Murray
2000	Barefaced Chic	Fascinating Aida
2000	Soul Train	Mark Clements and Michael Vivian
2002
2002	Shockheaded Peter	Julian Bleach, Anthony Cairns, Graeme Gilmour and Tamzin Griffin
2002	The Pub Landlord - My Gaff, My Rules	Al Murray
2002	Barbara Cook Sings Mostly Sondheim	Barbara Cook
2002	The League of Gentlemen	Jeremy Dyson, Mark Gatiss, Steve Pemberton and Reece Shearsmith
2002	The Vagina Monologues	Eve Ensler
2003
2003	Play Without Words	Matthew Bourne
2003	Contact	Susan Stroman and John Weidman
2003	Elaine Stritch at Liberty	John Lahr and Elaine Stritch
2003	Rory Bremner with John Bird and John Fortune	Rory Bremner
2004
2004	Duckie's C'est Barbican!	Ursula Martinez, Christopher Green and Marisa Carnesky
2004	Jus' Like That	John Fisher
2004	My Brilliant Divorce	Geraldine Aron
2004	One Last Flutter	Fascinating Aïda
2004	The Rat Pack: Live From Las Vegas	Mitch Sebastian, Paul Walden and Derek Nicol
2006
2006	Something Wicked This Way Comes	Derren Brown
2006	Blue Man Group	Blue Man Group
2006	Ducktastic	The Right Size
2009
2009	La Clique	La Clique
2009	Brief Encounter	Noël Coward
2009	Maria Friedman: Rearranged	Maria Friedman

=== 2010s ===
Year	Production	Writer
2010
2010	Morecambe	Tim Whitnall
2010	Arturo Brachetti: Change	Sean Foley
2010	Derren Brown: Enigma	Derren Brown and Andy Nyman
2011
2011	The Railway Children	Mike Kenny
2011	Beauty and the Beast	Lucy Kirkwood
2011	Ghost Stories	Jeremy Dyson and Andy Nyman
2011	Potted Panto	Daniel Clarkson and Jefferson Turner
2012
2012	Svengali	Derren Brown
2012	Midnight Tango	Vincent Simone and Flavia Cacace
2012	Potted Potter	Daniel Clarkson and Jefferson Turner
2012	The Tiger Who Came to Tea	David Wood
2013
2013	Goodnight Mister Tom	David Wood
2013	Cinderella: A Fairytale	Sally Cookson
2013	Hansel and Gretel	Lucy Kirkwood
2013	Room on the Broom	Tall Stories Theatre Company
2014
2014	The Wind in the Willows	Will Tuckett
2014	Derren Brown: Infamous	Derren Brown
2014	Eat, Pray, Laugh!	Barry Humphries
2014	Eric and Little Ern	Jonty Stephens and Ian Ashpitel
2015
2015	La Soirée	Brett Haylock, Mick Perrin and Mark Rubinstein
2015	Dance 'til Dawn	Andrew Guerdat and Steven Kreinberg
2015	Hetty Feather	Jacqueline Wilson and Emma Reeves
2016
2016	Showstopper	N/A
2016	Alice's Adventures Underground	Anthony Spargo and Oliver Lansley
2016	The Lorax	Dr. Seuss
2016	I Want My Hat Back	Jon Klassen
2016	Peter Pan	J. M. Barrie
2017
2017	The Red Shoes	Matthew Bourne
2017	Cinderella	Michael Harrison
2017	David Baddiel – My Family: Not the Sitcom	David Baddiel
2017	Peter Pan	J.M. Barrie (devised by the company)
2018
2018	Dick Whittington	Alan McHugh
2018	David Walliam's Gangsta Granny	Neal Foster
2018	Derren Brown: Underground	Derren Brown
2018	Five Guys Named Moe	Clarke Peters
2019
2019	A Monster Calls	Patrick Ness (devised by the company)
2019	Snow White	Michael Harrison
2019	Songs for Nobodies	Joanna Murray-Smith
2019	The Wider Earth	David Morton

=== 2020s ===
Year	Production	Writer
2020
2020	The Worst Witch	Emma Reeves
2020	Mr Gum and the Dancing Bear	Jim Fortune (music) and Andy Stanton (lyrics and book)
2020	Oi Frog and Friends	Emma Earle, Zoe Squire, Luke Bateman and Richy Hughes
2020	To the Moon and Back	Paula Manning
2021	Not presented due to extended closing of theatre productions during COVID-19 pandemic (Note: Due to late March 2020 to late July 2021 closing of London theatre productions during the COVID-19 pandemic in England, the 2022 awards recognise productions that launched anytime from February 2020 to February 2022)	
2022
2022	Wolf Witch Giant Fairy	Little Bulb (Clare Beresford, Dominic Conway and Alexander Scott)
2022	Billionaire Boy	Neal Foster
2022	Dragons and Mythical Beasts	Derek Bond
2022	What the Ladybird Heard	Julia Donaldson and Lydia Monks
2023
2023	Hey Duggee the Live Theatre Show	Vikki Stone & Matthew Xia
2023	Blippi the Musical	
2023	Midsummer Mechanicals	Ben Hales & Kerry Frampton
2023	The Smartest Giant in Town	Julia Donaldson & Axel Scheffler, adapted by Barb Jungr & Samantha Lane
2024
2024	Dinosaur World Live	Derek Bond, Laura Cubitt & Max Humphries
2024	Bluey's Big Play	Joe Brumm
2024	The House with Chicken Legs	Sophie Anderson, adapted by Oliver Lansley
2024	The Smeds and the Smoos	Julia Donaldson & Axel Scheffler, adapted by Tall Stories
2025
2025	Brainiac Live	Marylebone Theatre
2025	Maddie Moate's Very Curious Christmas	Maddie Moate
2025	The Nutcracker	Pyotr Ilyich Tchaikovsky
2025	Rough Magic	Shakespeare's Globe - Sam Wanamaker Playhouse

== See also ==
- Drama Desk Award for Unique Theatrical Experience
- Tony Award for Best Special Theatrical Event
