= A Christmas Carol (1988 play) =

1988 one-man stage performance

- Window card for original Broadway production, 1991
- Original language: English
- Written by: Charles Dickens; Adapted by Patrick Stewart
- Based on: A Christmas Carol by Charles Dickens
- Genre: Drama/Monodrama

Premiere
- Date: 1987
- Place: Mirfield, West Yorkshire

A Christmas Carol is a one-man stage performance by English actor Patrick Stewart of the Charles Dickens 1843 novella of the same title, which has been performed in the United Kingdom and the United States on occasion since 1988.

Stewart was originally inspired to create the adaptation during the production of the 1986 film Lady Jane. It is performed without costumes or props, and has Stewart playing more than 30 characters. Critics have praised Stewart's portrayal and compared them to the readings performed by Dickens during the 19th century. A film adaptation of the play, with Stewart reprising his role, aired on TNT in 1999, directed by David Jones and co-starring Richard E. Grant.

== Background ==
A Christmas Carol is a novella by English writer Charles Dickens, first published on 19 December 1843. It has been adapted into a variety of media, with the first theater production taking place in London within six weeks of publication. The run lasted for 40 nights before transferring to the Park Theatre in New York City. In 1853, Dickens began to perform the story itself in public, performing each of the characters himself without props or costume changes. He continued to make these occasional recitals until his final public performance on 15 March 1870.

Patrick Stewart first became influenced by the story during the production of his 1986 film Lady Jane. In a break between filming, he discovered that he had read all the newspapers and magazines he had available in his hotel. However, it had a small library available to guests. Stewart picked up an old copy of A Christmas Carol, having realised that while he was familiar with the story, he had never read it. He compared the major theme of redemption in the story to those he had previously seen in the works of William Shakespeare.

== Production ==
Stewart began developing an adaptation of the story to be performed in a one-man show. The then-three-hour performance was only performed in public at the parish church in Mirfield, West Yorkshire in support of their church organ restoration. It was not until during the production of the second season of Star Trek: The Next Generation two years later that Stewart began to work on re-developing it into a shorter but still full-length solo performance. He took his work to Professor Albert Hutter, a Dickens scholar at the University of California, Los Angeles, for reassurance that he hadn't made any mistakes in his adaptation. His first performance was in Hutter's home in front of around 18 people, and he found the response encouraging.

During the course of the play, Stewart acts as more than 30 characters. Out of all of them, he found the Ghost of Christmas Yet to Come the most difficult, saying that, as written, "he's a pointing hand and little else". There are no props or costume changes, although he tried using a glass of water as a prop in a single performance. Stewart compared the overall experience of performing A Christmas Carol to a roller coaster and a merry-go-round at the same time because of the pace of it. He added that "Technically, vocally, and physically, it's very demanding, because I'm on my feet a lot", requiring him to train for physical fitness in order to be able to deliver the performance on a repeated basis.

He performed the play at Caltech's Beckman Auditorium during several Christmas seasons. Stewart then took the play to New York City in 1991 for 16 performances. The success of that run resulted in him receiving the Drama Desk Award for Outstanding One-Person Show and a further run in the city during 1992 for 24 more performances. This also led to Stewart and A Christmas Carol being featured on the front cover of Starlog, typically a science fiction magazine, due to the actor's links to The Next Generation. In 1993, the production toured during December, and Stewart performed at several locations including the Cerritos Center for the Performing Arts and in London at the Old Vic Theatre. He returned to New York in 1994 and again in 2001 with a further eight performances at the Marquis Theatre on Broadway, the takings of which all went to a charity such as Actors Fund of America, the Coalition for the Homeless, and Food for Survival, Inc. A further run of 23 performances at the Albery Theatre occurred in 2005, replacing the poorly received Ducktastic which had been due to run until the following year. Yet another New York run in 2019 followed.

== Reception ==
Following the start of the initial New York run in 1991, Mel Gussow wrote for The New York Times that Stewart's one-man version restored A Christmas Carol to the original "full narrative splendor" as well as showing both the humour and humanity present. Stewart's performance was compared to the original Dickens recitals, and the reviewer said that it made them want to see the actor perform other Dickens classics too. Nancy Churnin reviewed the play for the Los Angeles Times in 1993, saying that Stewart was "able to fill the stage all the more richly with his own penetrating and versatile voice, his mastery of gesture, and facial expressions that instantly summon fear, delight, longing, and awe." He added that the actor's performance prevented Ebenezer Scrooge from being seen as a "caricature" but instead as an "Everyman whose sins are present in most of us to varying degrees."

Critics reviewing the 2005 run in London at the Albery Theater included Maxie Szalwinska for the Metro, who said that the play was "a reminder that you don't need angel-voiced choirs, a cute Tiny Tim hobbling around on crutches or lashings of fake snow and tinsel to make a satisfying Christmas show. The most important ingredient is a cracking story, well told." She praised the performance and added that it made her want to read more Dickens instead of watching television over the festive season. Lyn Gardner, while writing for The Guardian, praised the usage of the original text and said that Stewart's means of saying the classic "Bah humbug" line was "sheer brilliance". She said that the storytelling was "nicely done" and that Stewart showed Scrooge as a man "who has constructed a prison of loneliness and erected bars around his own heart".

=== Awards ===
- 1992 Drama Desk Award for Outstanding One-Person Show
- 1994 Laurence Olivier Award for Best Entertainment
- 2007 Whatsonstage.com Award for Best Solo Performance

== See also ==
- Adaptations of A Christmas Carol
  - A Christmas Carol (1999), also starring Patrick Stewart
