= Do You Come Here Often? =

Do You Come Here Often? may refer to:

- "Do You Come Here Often?" (song), by The Tornados
- Do You Come Here Often? (novel), by Alexandra Potter
- Do You Come Here Often? (play), by Sean Foley and Hamish McColl
