= Oxford Youth Theatre =

UK theatrical troupe

The Oxford Youth Theatre (OYT) is based in Oxford, England. It was founded in 1962 and established the Pegasus Theatre in 1975.

== History ==
- 1962: Oxford Youth Theatre (OYT) opened for 14- to 21-year-olds. The group was run by Roy Copeman, an ex-Air Force pilot. From the 1950s, Roy Copeman ran drama groups in East Oxford including the Gladiators, in Marston Road. OYT take up residence in a former schools meals service kitchen in Magdalen Road in East Oxford. Their first production was A Christmas Carol.
- 1966: Tiered seating for 80 built by members of OYT during the summer in the temporary buildings that are their home in Magdalen Road. They also create a box office, and crawl into the low roof to put in a lighting box. Under Milk Wood was staged. In fact, at this time the group were known as The Link. Ross was performed in December and that takings were £31 – a record.
- 1967: Juno and the Paycock. And the first Glasbury course was held at Easter at Woodlands.
- 1969: A drama festival was held at the youth theatre premises. Up to 15 shows a year were put on, one of which was Rookery Nook.
- 1970: Fund-raising appeal launched for new building.
- 1973: Pinter's The Celebration performed. The Oxford Mail's review for the play as a whole was a favourable; however, it only mentioned three individuals: Polly Vincent, Roz Thomas and Heather Birch – and the reviewer said the play depended on them.
- 1974: Zigger Zagger performed. David Healey was cast as Zigger Zagger. The journalist Misha Glenny took two parts. The Oxford Mail review was not good but the Oxford Times review was better and called out Graham Thomas.
- 1974: Final performance in the old theatre: Oh, What a Lovely War!
- 1975: Pegasus Theatre opens. Temporary buildings at the rear are still used for rehearsals. The first production on the new stage was The Royal Hunt of the Sun – Hepburn Harrison-Graham plays lead role of Atahuallpa. Old working buildings still in use behind the theatre as rehearsal and workshop spaces. Gates erected at the side of the new theatre depicting the initials of Joyce Harris an actress who was voice coach to the youth theatre members.
- 1976: You Can't Take It With You – directed by Roy Copeman
- 1976: Hot Summer Night – directed by Roy Copeman
- 1977: Inherit the Wind by Jerome Lawrence and Robert Edwin Lee. Hepburn Harrison-Graham plays role of Henry Drummond, Richard Self play Mathew Harrison – Brady
- 1978: King Oedipus – Hepburn Harrison-Graham plays lead role of Oedipus. Oxford Mail review says: "Here is an actor of much promise, with a fine voice and commanding presence, who sustained a demanding role with considerable skill."
- 1978: Gotcha by Barrie Keeffe: Tod O'Boyle plays lead role of Kid, directed by Hepburn Harrison-Graham
- 1978: Roy Copeman retires. Fred Richings becomes the new head of Pegasus Theatre.
- 1979: Class Enemy by Nigel Williams: directed by Hepburn Harrison-Graham
- 1982: Ray Harrison Graham, regular actor and director at OYT devises and directs A Way Of Life, the story of a group of young Mods in London's East End. He recruits and trains members of the OYT to perform this piece, which plays to packed houses every night. Fred Ritchings mentors Ray, as well as designing and building the set.
- 1983: Tony Davis and Simon Mellor take over as joint heads.
- 1983: Ray Harrison Graham returns from Webber Douglas Drama Academy to devise and direct YOP!, a play that tells of disastrous events unfolding on a Youth Opportunities Training scheme in Thatcher's Britain. Packed houses again... Lighting Design – Dave Cosgrave. Set Builder – Barnaby Stone.
- 1984: The 1982 Company give the first performance in English of Dario Fo's Mistero Buffo. Company members Annabel Arden (later Complicité), Neil Bartlett and Annie Griffen return to perform and work with OYT at the Pegasus throughout the 1980s.
- 1984: First Complicité production, A Minute Too Late, rehearsed and performed at Pegasus Theatre. Complicité (Annabel Arden, Marcello Magni, Jozef Houben and Simon McBurney) also run a two-week residency at Pegasus Theatre and collaborate with OYT on Theatre Without Words. This relationship forms the model for future youth theatre projects. Complicité also run a series of workshops in local schools, including Marston Middle School, Oxford, with teacher Philip Pullman.
- 1984, December: OYT perform Gas by Georg Kaiser.
- 1985: January: Complicité rehearse at Pegasus Theatre.
- 1985, Saturday, 23 February: Complicité perform at a benefit performance for the Miners.
- 1985, March: OYT perform Vinegar Tom by Caryl Churchill.
- 1985, April: The 1982 Company perform The Tempest.
- 1985, 3–9 June: Black Theatre Cooperative residency at Pegasus Theatre. They run a series of workshops for the youth theatre and in local schools and perform A Raisin in the Sun, directed by Yvonne Brewster.
- 1985, 4–13 July: Neil Bartlett's 1982 Company create Casasola in collaboration with OYT, based on photos from the Archivo Casasola, in Mexico City. The production tours to local schools, community centres and is also performed at the newly opened Museum of Modern Art in Oxford.
- 1985, 14 July: Théâtre de Complicité start a two week residency, they perform a double bill with OYT on Saturday 20 July.
- 1986: OYT collaborate on Mahagonny Songspiel with Neil Bartlett, Nicholas Bloomfield and Leah Hausman (who went on to found theatre company Gloria in 1988) in 1988).
- 1985, Complicité also collaborate on two more shows with OYT: The Swindler, performed in May, and Fiesta in July. Fiesta is a benefit to raise funds for Chile.
- * Saturday, 26 April: Rose English performs Thee, thy, thou and thine at Pegasus.
- 1987: Tuesday Group formed for people with learning disabilities.
- 1987: Basic Theatre Company, under Ray Harrison Graham's artistic direction, perform Children of a Lesser God, with Sarah Scott in the lead role.
- 1988: Simon Mellor leaves Pegasus to work in the Education Department on the South Bank and to administrate Neil Bartlett's new company Gloria.
- 1989: OYT create a performance project with Gloria, using their production of Ariadne as a stimulus. Tutors include: Annie Griffen, theatre; Nicholas Bloomfield, music; and Leah Hausman and Liz Rankin, movement (DV8).
- 1989: The Right Size formed. The internationally acclaimed theatre company were former OYT members.
- 1990: Euton Daley joins Pegasus as Artistic Director from Greenwich Young People's Theatre in London. Pegasus commission Eisenstein – share the vision summer project with Museum of Modern Art, Oxford.
- 1991: 12 companies from 13 countries performed and led workshops at Pegasus.
- 1992: How to Trap The Sun – OYT performance and video project looking at ways of staging myths.
- 1993: Pegasus links with London International Mime Festival as satellite venue outside London.
- 1994: Black Toby written by Richard Pinner, directed by Euton Daley and more than a hundred young people.
- 1995: International youth exchange project between OYT and Studio Dum in Brno.
- 1997: Do You Come Here Often?, successful West End transfer from Pegasus by The Right Size.
- 1998: OYT and participants from Pegasus outreach projects perform Club Culture. First in a series of showcases for local young bands Sounding Off.
- 1999: OYT commission a new musical Into The Fire. Catalyst Dragon on the Roof in a double bill with OYT.
- 2000: Play by Richard Pinner The Bowery. New writing festival Page to Stage includes play reading, talks and performances. Shows include premiere productions of Winnie the Witch with the newly founded Saturday Drama Club for five- to nine-year-olds designed by Korky Paul and Death and Everything After by OYT member Ben Coren.
- 2001: Gelede Dance Company, founded by OYT member Menelva Harry, work with OYT on new dance piece In Becoming A Woman for International Women's Festival. First production by newly formed Junior OYT (10–13 years), The Golden Door. First production by newly formed Adult Drama Group of Our Country's Good by Timberlake Wertenbaker.
- * Peepolykus, an internationally successful physical theatre comedy company founded by former OYT member John Nicholson, work with OYT to create a Christmas show The Sanity Clause.
- 2002: Pegasus provides after schools clubs for schools in East Oxford, all of whom present their work in After Hours in Pegasus stage. OYT and the Cap and Stocking Players take The Pilgrimage show to the Crearc International Youth Theatre Festival at Grenoble in France. Pegasus collaborate with Sure Start in Rose Hill to produce Love Me Tender, a moving piece about domestic violence.
- 2003: New work from Gelede Dance, Sky Burial created in collaboration with music group SoundArk. John Nicholson returns to work with OYT on Sanity Clause II, based on Paul Gallico story.
- 2004: Pegasus wins lottery bid of £2.7 million towards rebuilding the theatre and adding studio, rehearsal, meeting and office spaces as well as improving foyer spaces for the general public. Junior OYT involved in creating a special performance to be shown at a conference on family breakdown A Child's Voice. Former OYT member Ben Coren adapts Philip Pullman novel I was a Rat! for the stage.
- 2005: OYT perform Discontented Winter: House Remix for the National Theatre's Connections Festival. OYT visit to Perm in Russia following the International Youth Festival. Sanity Clause III: Messiah inspired by Illusions by Richard Bach, created with John Nicholson.
- 2006: OYT and OYD join to create an environmental performance showcase The Lorax and Other Environmental Tales. Oxford Dance Forum is launched at Pegasus and the first in a series of dance residencies with Sakoba Dance Theatre takes place.
- 2007: Pegasus as a founder of the Oxford Dance Forum is co-host of the city's first ever dance festival, Dancin' Oxford 2007. Gelede Dance premiere Snake in the Geisha Palm.
- 2009: Pegasus Theatre demolishes all buildings to redesign, providing better services for actors, dancers and production teams.
- 2010: In September the theatre reopened with in the new building.
- 2011: Pegasus celebrated its 50th anniversary in November with a year-long series of events and activities, with celebrations ending in 2012.
