= Pride and Prejudice* (*sort of) =

2018 play by Isobel McArthur

- Written by: Isobel McArthur
- Based on: Pride and Prejudice by Jane Austen
- Genre: Romantic comedy with songs

Premiere
- Date: 1 September 2018
- Place: Tron Theatre, Glasgow
- Directed by: Paul Brotherston
- Official website

Pride and Prejudice* (*sort of) is a play by Isobel McArthur, with songs, based on Jane Austen's novel. The play is designed for a cast of five or six women, each playing a servant and several of the main characters. After an initial production in Scotland in 2018 and a tour in 2019–20, it opened in the West End in 2021 and toured again in 2022–23. The production won the Laurence Olivier Award for Best Entertainment or Comedy Play.

== Premise ==
The plot hews closely to the Austen novel, but with modern language. The all-female cast of five or six each play multiple characters, both servants and gentry, retelling the novel's events through the servants' eyes and performing "hilariously well-chosen karaoke songs at pivotal moments".

== Productions ==
The play premiered at the Tron Theatre in Glasgow, Scotland, on 28 June 2018 running until 14 July, produced by Blood of the Young. It was directed by Paul Brotherston and designed by Ana Inés Jabares-Pita. The all-female cast included Tori Burgess, Felixe Forde, Christina Gordon, Hannah Jarrett-Scott, Isobel McArthur and Meghan Tyler.

A UK tour of the production opened with the original Glasgow cast at the Bristol Old Vic (7– 28 September 2019) before touring to Northern Stage Newcastle (2 – 12 October), Birmingham Repertory Theatre (15 October – 2 November), The Royal Lyceum Theatre Edinburgh (24 January – 15 February 2020), Leeds Playhouse (25 – 29 February) Oxford Playhouse (10 – 14 March) and Nuffield Southampton Theatres (17 March, which was cancelled after two performances due to the COVID-19 pandemic). The playtext was published by Nick Hern Books on 12 September 2019.

The play began performances in London's West End at the Criterion Theatre on 15 October 2021, with an official opening on 2 November, produced by David Pugh. McArthur and Simon Harvey direct, and the cast consists of McArthur as Darcy and Mrs Bennet, Burgess as Mr Collins, Gordon as Lady Catherine de Bourgh and Jane, Jarrett-Scott as Charlotte and Charles Bingley and Tyler as Lizzie Bennet. "Comedy staging" is by Jos Houben, scenic design by Jabares-Pita, lighting design by Colin Grenfell, sound design by Michael John McCarthy and Luke Swaffield, and choreography by Emily-Jane Boyle.

A second UK tour opened at the Minack Theatre, Cornwall (an open-air theatre) in September 2022, and ran until June 2023.

A third UK tour opened at the Theatre Royal, Newcastle in September 2024, and ran until June 2025.

=== International Productions ===
==== Romania ====
A Romanian production of the show (titled Mândrie și prejudecată (un fel de)) premiered on 19 September 2024, at Teatrul Excelsior, in Sala ION LUCIAN. It is translated by Adrian Nicolae and directed by Alexandru Mâzgăreanu. The production also released a trailer.

==== Czech Republic ====
A Czech premiere production of the show (translated to Czech) opened on 6 February 2026 in Liberec in the F. X. Šalda Theatre.

== Songs ==
The play features numerous pop songs including;

- Everyday I Write the Book
- Young Hearts Run Free
- Will You Love Me Tomorrow
- The Lady in Red
- I Got You Babe
- Holding Out for a Hero
- You're So Vain

== Critical reception ==
The play earned warm reviews from Variety, The Independent, The Stage, The Guardian and others, praising the adaptation and execution, but reviews in The Times and The Evening Standard, among others, were mixed, suggesting that the script could be "sleeker".

The production was nominated for three Laurence Olivier Awards in 2022, winning for Best Entertainment or Comedy Play.

== Awards and nominations ==
Year	Award	Category	Nominee	Result
2022	Laurence Olivier Award	Best Entertainment or Comedy Play		Won
2022	Laurence Olivier Award	Best Actress in a Supporting Role	Tori Burgess	Nominated
2022	Laurence Olivier Award	Best Actress in a Supporting Role	Christina Gordon	Nominated
2022	WhatsOnStage Award	Best New Play		Nominated
2022	WhatsOnStage Award	Best Supporting Performer in a Female Identifying Role in a Play	Isobel McArthur	Nominated
