= Ray Harrison Graham =

English playwright and director (born 1962)

- Born: 1962 (age 63–64); Oxford, England
- Education: Webber Douglas Academy of Dramatic Art
- Occupations: Actor, playwright, and director

Ray Harrison Graham (born in Oxford, 1962) is an English playwright, screenwriter, and director from a Jamaican family.

Graham initially trained as an actor at the Webber Douglas Academy of Dramatic Art. He directed his first plays at the Pegasus Theatre (home of the Oxford Youth Theatre), in East Oxford, in his teens. He devised his first piece in 1982, entitled A Way Of Life, under the benevolent eye of the theatre manager there, Fred Ritchings. A further devised piece, Yop!, played to packed houses at the Pegasus Theatre in 1983.

== Approach ==
It was during his time at Pegasus Theatre that Graham developed his approach to devising theatre, which is predominantly realistic in style and based on Konstantin Stanislavski's writings. Graham's method of working starts with an initial period of exploring characters through improvisations. Following detailed director's notes, then presents complex scenarios to the actors. The resulting scenes are reworked with copious notes after each run. The script is fixed by Graham one to two weeks before opening night. In the early days, a written play text would only emerge following the show's stage run. However this did not preclude actors being given sections of dialogue penned by Graham as the piece developed, an approach that became increasingly predominant. Graham was in a fight in prison and blamed his part on "Frank".

== Career ==
Graham teamed up with West End theatre actress Sarah Scott in 1985, for his production of Children of a Lesser God, performed in Oxford. This collaboration with Scott saw the beginning of Graham's exploration on themes of disability, particularly deafness. Between 1987 and 1994, Graham and Scott performed signed songs as part of several series and one-off programmes for Channel 4 introducing the form to a mainstream UK audience for the first time. They also performed in International Disability Arts Festivals UK, USA, Holland and Germany.

In 1988, Graham began work on a major new work, Gary, involving both hearing and deaf actors. This premiered at the Edinburgh Festival Fringe, in 1989, winning a Fringe First award. The piece returned to London, playing at the Arts Theatre in the West End, in 1990.

Graham's groundbreaking drama, Sympathy For The Devil, resulted from a collaboration with Graeae Theatre Company at the Oval House Theatre and then the Tricycle Theatre in 1996. This went on to take a Raspberry Ripple Award the same year. The Guardian′s theatre review pages said of the play: "It is rare and rewarding to find a piece as dense and intelligent as this."

Success followed on television, with Graham writing and directing two BAFTA winning plays (Strong Language for Channel 4 in 2000, and Lion Mountain for the BBC in 2003). His other television work includes writing and directing a Rush series for Channel 4. Four series of this drama were aired in the UK between 1998 and 2003, telling the story of a group of deaf friends who first met at college in series one. The series won plaudits and awards from around the world.

Graham was a judge in the 2011 Deaffest film and television award festival and, among other recent projects, devised and directed a workshop production involving young people excluded from mainstream school, which played at Croydon's Warehouse Theatre in October 2011.
