= The Right Size =

UK theatrical troupe

The Right Size was a British theatre company active from 1988 to 2006, led by Sean Foley and Hamish McColl, who met while studying at École Philippe Gaulier in France. The company won numerous awards including the Olivier Award for Best Entertainment, the Olivier Award for Best Comedy, the Total Theatre Award, a Tony Award nomination for Special Theatrical Event, and two nominations for the Olivier Award for Best Actor. Their major success was The Play What I Wrote, a tribute to Morecambe and Wise, and other key productions included Do You Come Here Often? and Ducktastic.

== Early years ==
Foley and McColl have frequently been reported as saying that they met in Paris around 1987 when they were learning to be clowns under Philippe Gaulier at École Philippe Gaulier (with both leaving after a month when they ran out of money). But it seems more likely they met earlier at Oxford Youth Theatre. They formed The Right Size in January 1988. The name arose when working on their first show, which was originally titled The Right Size. When they decided to change the name of that show to Que Sera, they kept The Right Size as their company name. McColl said this was because they "liked everybody's aspirations to be the right size."

From their earliest shows, such as Que Sera, The Bath, Flight to Finland and Moose, The Right Size often tried out productions at the Edinburgh Festival Fringe or London International Mime Festival, and then toured in the UK, Europe and internationally, sometimes in collaboration with the British Council. The shows were devised by Foley and McColl with their collaborating co-performers and creative team. "I grew up by creating my own work," Foley said later. "Nobody was going to give me a job, so I created one myself by creating a theatre company, The Right Size. On the first show my partner, Hamish McColl, and I built the set, drove the van, did the show, took the set out, went to the pub."

They were described early on in terms such as "one of Britain's most promising young clown theatre companies" and "[t]he multilingual clowning theatre company [that] specialises in brash physical comedy that is part mime, part slapstick and can just about be traced back to the traditions of the commedia dell'arte". McColl, commenting later on 1980s trends in "physical theatre" based around schools such as those of Philippe Gaulier and Jacques Lecoq in Paris, said, "The difference for us is that we hitched ourselves more to vaudeville and variety. We like to see ourselves as much in that tradition as in the explosion from France."

== Double act focus ==
From 1994 and Stop Calling Me Vernon, Foley and McColl focused on working as a double act. "We'd always had other people in our shows," Foley recalled. "This was the first time we said, 'I tell you what, let's just do two weeks' rehearsal, just the two of us, and see what we come up with.' And when we put it up in front of an audience, they laughed their socks off. That's when we found that we were a double-act." Stop Calling Me Vernon was about a fading vaudeville duo, practicing their old gags whilst waiting for their next big break.

Their major 1997 success Do You Come Here Often? was about two strangers stuck in a bathroom for 25 years. The show was inspired by the experiences of Beirut hostages Brian Keenan and John McCarthy.

== The Play What I Wrote and Ducktastic ==
The Right Size achieved major UK and international success with The Play What I Wrote. The production played Broadway and London, winning two Olivier Awards and receiving numerous other Olivier Award nominations. Their final play together was 2005's Ducktastic, a satire on Siegfried and Roy, but with performing ducks instead of tigers.

== Collaborators and influences ==
Foley and McColl were loyal collaborators with others, working consistently with behind-the-scenes partners over the years including director Jozef Houben, from 1991-2001, designer Alice Power, from 1991-2006 and songwriter Chris Larner, from 1992-2000. Through these collaborators, and others such as co-performer Micheline Vandepoel, The Right Size have links to physical theatre companies such as Complicité and Spymonkey and their teacher Philippe Gaulier.

The duo have regularly credited vaudeville legend Johnny Hutch as an inspiration.

== Productions ==
Productions were generally devised, written and performed in by Foley and McColl.

The Right Size theatre productions
Date	Production	Director	Theatre	Notes
1988	Que Sera	Jozef Houben	Almeida Theatre	Also Edinburgh Festival Fringe.
	The Bath	Jozef Houben		Toured UK and internationally, including Europe, Malaysia and Hong Kong. Also Edinburgh Festival Fringe.
1991	Flight To Finland	Jozef Houben	London International Mime Festival	Toured in 1993 including UK, Europe, and South America.
1992	Moose	Jozef Houben	London International Mime Festival	Toured the UK and internationally.
1993	Penny Dreadful		Battersea Arts Centre	Toured the UK and internationally.
1994	Baldy Hopkins	Hamish McColl	Cochrane Theatre	Toured the UK and internationally.
1994	Stop Calling Me Vernon	Jozef Houben	Edinburgh Festival Fringe	Toured the UK.
1995	Hold Me Down	Jozef Houben	Purcell Room	Toured the UK and internationally.
1997	Do You Come Here Often?	Jozef Houben	Lyric Hammersmith Studio	Also Edinburgh Festival Fringe and Vaudeville Theatre. Winner of the 1997 Total Theatre Award for Most Innovative overall production. Winner of the 1999 Olivier Award for Best Entertainment.
1998	Mr Puntila and his Man Matti	Kathryn Hunter	Almeida Theatre	A co-production between The Right Size and the Almeida Theatre, adapted by Lee Hall from the play by Bertolt Brecht. Also at the Traverse Theatre and a UK tour. McColl played Mr Puntila, Foley played Matti.
2001	Bewilderness	Jozef Houben	Lyric Hammersmith	Also toured.
2001	The Play What I Wrote	Kenneth Branagh	Wyndhams Theatre	Also Lyceum Theatre on Broadway.
2005	Ducktastic	Kenneth Branagh	Albery Theatre	

=== TV ===
- Foley & McColl: This Way Up, 2005

=== Radio ===
- The Remains of Foley and McColl, 2000
- Foley and McColl: The Interview, 2003
