= The Full Monty (play) =

Play

- Official poster of the 2014 West End production
- Written by: Simon Beaufoy
- Genre: Black comedy
- Setting: Sheffield in the 1990s

Premiere
- Date: 2 February 2013
- Place: Lyceum Theatre, Sheffield

The Full Monty is a black comedy play written by Simon Beaufoy, from his original screenplay for the 1997 film The Full Monty. It made its world premiere at the Lyceum Theatre, Sheffield in February 2013, before touring the United Kingdom. A West End production was launched at the Noël Coward Theatre in February 2014. Followed by UK Tours in 2014/15 and 2016/17.

In 2023 a brand new production opened at the Everyman Theatre, Cheltenham, produced by Mark Goucher Productions and Buxton Opera House, which is currently touring the UK until April 2024.

== Background ==
The Full Monty is written by Simon Beaufoy and marked his first attempt at writing for theatre. It is based on his own screenplay for the 1997 film of the same name. The film itself was made on a budget of £3 million and was a sleeper hit, earning over £160 million in global box office receipts becoming the highest-grossing film in the UK at the time. It was nominated for four Academy Awards, winning Best Original Score and received eleven Bafta Award nominations, winning four, including Best Film. The film is set in Sheffield, England, and it tells the story of six unemployed men, four of them former steel workers, who decide to form a male striptease act in order to gather enough money to get somewhere else in life and for main character, Gaz, to be able to see his son. An Americanised musical adaptation was launched in 2000, transferring to the West End's Prince of Wales Theatre in 2002.

Music in the play includes "You Sexy Thing" by Hot Chocolate, "You Can Leave Your Hat On" by Tom Jones, "I Got You (I Feel Good)" by James Brown, "Hot Stuff" by Donna Summer, "Flashdance... What a Feeling" by Irene Cara, "The Stripper" by David Rose, "Je t'aime... moi non plus" by Serge Gainsbourg and "Land of a Thousand Dances" by Wilson Pickett.

The play returns the story back to its Sheffield origins, rather than the Buffalo set musical. On the move back Beaufoy said "Without Sheffield, there would be no Full Monty. It's been a long road – via Hollywood – but finally the characters are coming back home to the place it all started."

== Production history ==
=== Original production and tour ===
In May 2012, it was announced The Full Monty would receive its world premiere in Sheffield in 2013. The play premiered at the Lyceum Theatre, Sheffield on 2 February 2013, running until 23 February. The production was directed by Daniel Evans, with choreography by Steven Hoggett, design by Robert Jones, lighting by Tim Lutkin and original music and sound design by Max and Ben Ringham. The lead cast for the show included Kenny Doughty as Gaz, Sidney Cole as Horse, Craig Gazey as Lomper, Roger Morlidge as Dave, Kieran O'Brien as Guy and Simon Rouse as Gerald. Following its debut in Sheffield the play embarked on an eleven venue tour visiting Birmingham, Bristol, Canterbury, Aberdeen, Belfast, Edinburgh, Dublin, Salford, Southampton, Southend On Sea and Leeds.

=== London transfer ===
In January 2014, the production began a short pre-West End run at the New Theatre, Cardiff, followed by the Theatre Royal in Bath. The show then transferred to the Noël Coward Theatre in the West End, where it began previews on 20 February 2014, before holding its official opening night on 25 February, booking until 14 June 2014. The original tour cast stayed with the production and tickets for the previews were sold at 1990's prices. The play received a Laurence Olivier Award nomination for Best New Comedy. On 16 March, it was announced the show would close early after just five weeks on 29 March, due to poor sales. The move surprised critics and cast alike, with an online petition also being launched. The petition was signed by the show’s writer Simon Beaufoy, who said of the show's producers David Pugh and Dafydd Rogers, "Why would a producer close his own show before it had any chance of finding an audience?" and "On the other hand, why would a producer never come to see his own show? Perhaps he can answer these questions. I can't because he hasn't spoken either to me or the creative team in months." The petition had no effect in terms of extending the production’s run and the play closed on 29 March, to be replaced by Good People.

=== 2014–2017 tour ===
A new production embarked on a 32-week tour of the United Kingdom, commencing at the Manchester Opera House, on 11 September 2014. Featuring a new cast, the show was seen in major venues throughout Britain, finishing back at Sheffield's Lyceum Theatre in June 2015. The second touring production was directed by Roger Haines and casting included Gary Lucy as Gaz, Louis Emerick as Horse, Bobby Schofield as Lomper, Martin Miller as Dave, Rupert Hill as Guy and Andrew Dunn as Gerald. A typical London performance ran two hours and 25 minutes, including one interval of 20 minutes.

The tour continued in September 2015, with the same cast. The tour continued from September 2016. Lucy, Emerick and Dunn continued in their roles, with new cast members Anthony Lewis as Lomper, Kai Owen as Dave, Chris Fountain as Guy and Fiona Skinner as Jean. The tour was directed by Jack Ryder, with choreography by Ian West, assistant direction by James Robert-Moore, design by Rob Jones, and lighting by Tim Lutkin.

=== 2023–2024 tour ===
In 2023 a brand new production of the play was produced by Mark Goucher Productions, Everyman Theatre, Cheltenham and Buxton Opera House. The show, directed by Michael Gyngell and produced by David Pugh, began touring the UK in September 2023 until April 2024. The cast included Jake Quickenden, Danny Hatchard, Bill Ward, Neil Hurst, Nicholas Prasad and Ben Onwukwe.

=== 2025 - Australia ===
The Malanda Theatre Company in Far North Queensland recently staged a new production of The Full Monty across two consecutive weekends, achieving sold-out performances and attracting a massive fan following. Director Nicola Salisbury-Faulkner, whose passion for the play is unmistakable, delivered exceptional direction that brought depth and authenticity to the production. Along with Producer Marky Baker also spearheaded the creation of a special fundraising calendar, with all profits donated to the Queensland State Emergency Service. Together, and along with a great cast, the production reached record-breaking engagement on Facebook, earning more hits than any previous Malanda Theatre play.

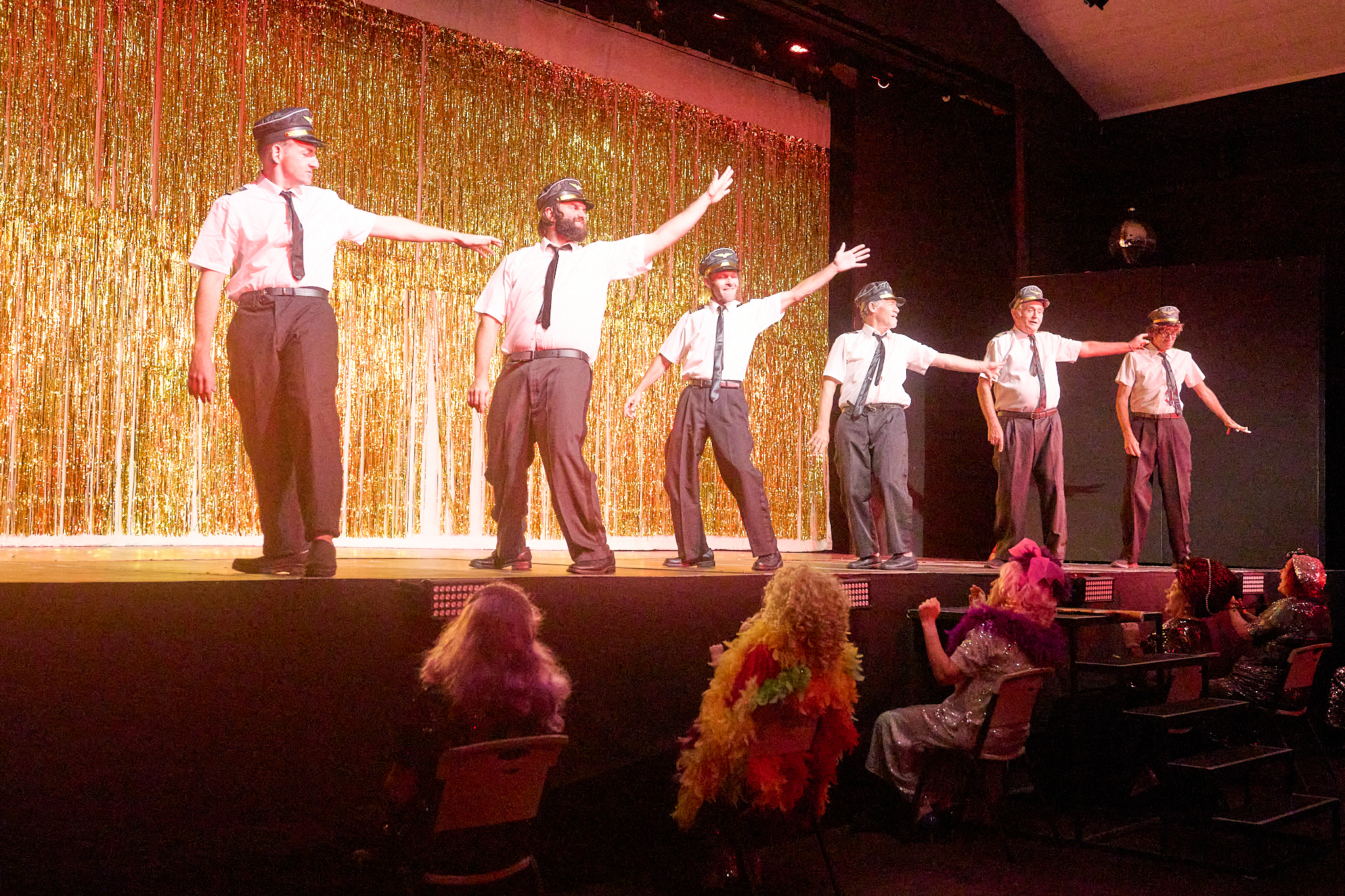
The Strip

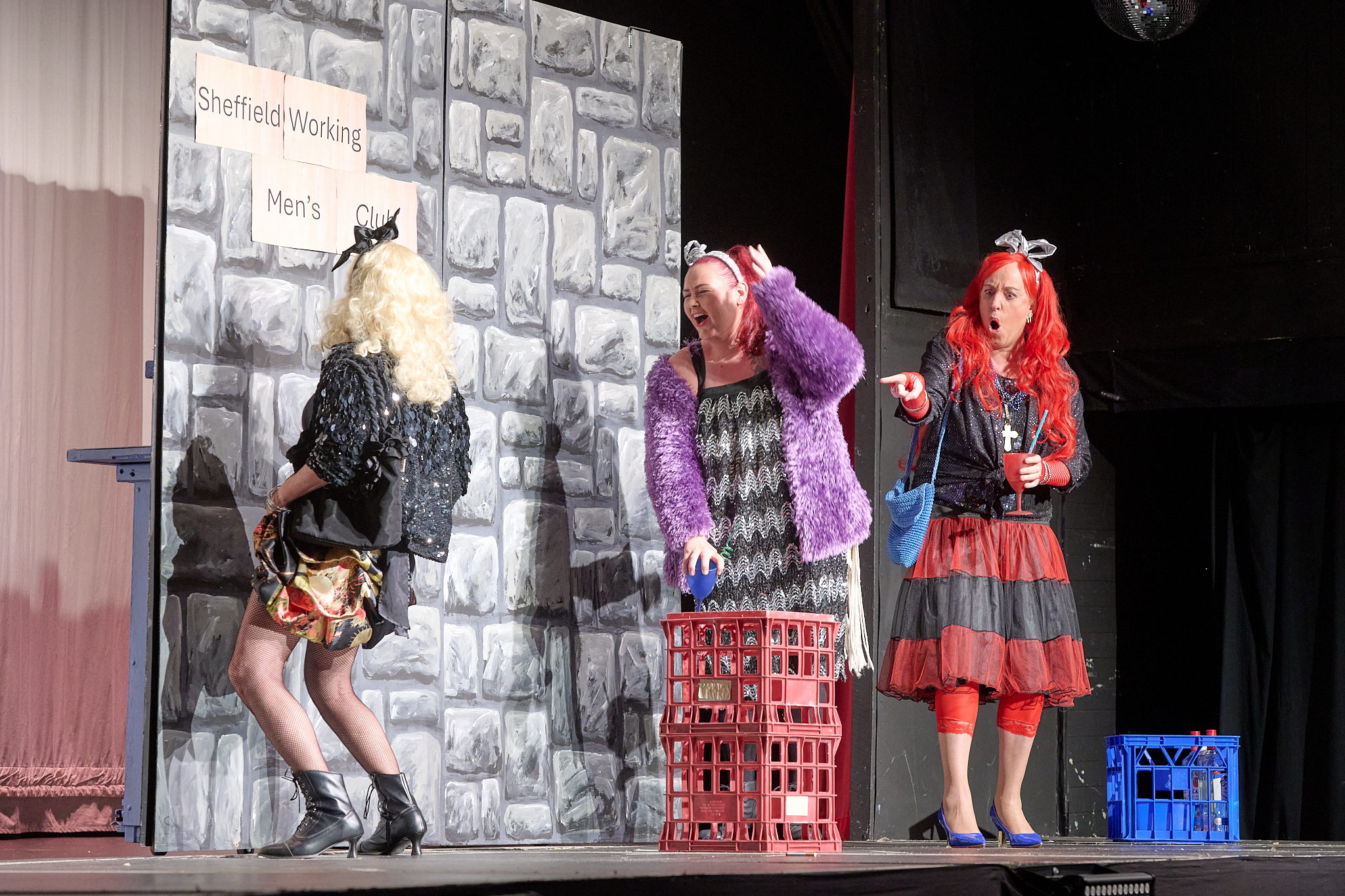
Party Girls

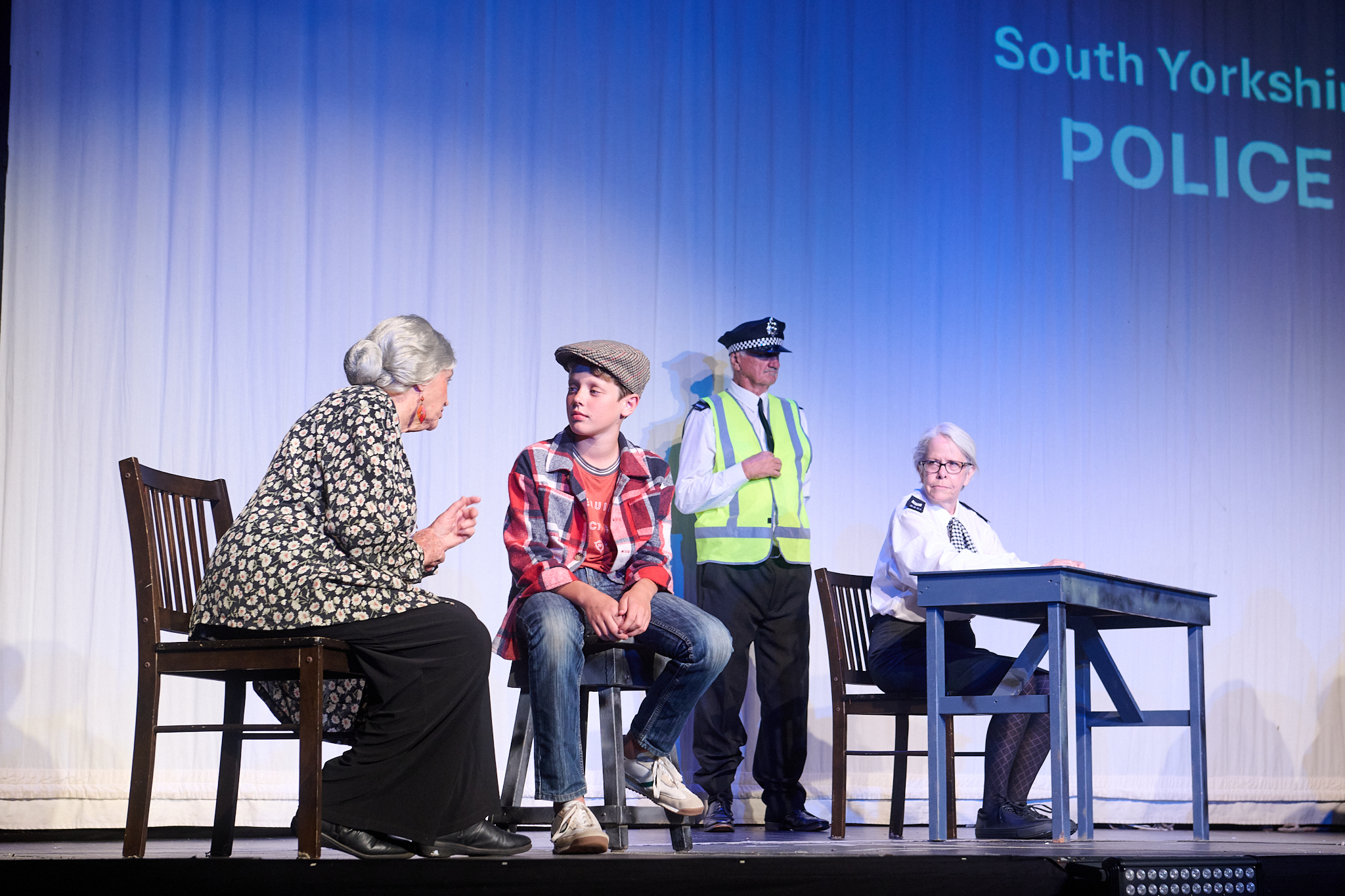
At the Police Station

Actor	Character
Andy Bramble	Gaz
Luke Turner	Nathan
Jake Skukan	Dave
Paul Bowater	Gerald
Chris Davey	Horse
Peter Arnold-Nott	Lomper
Tim Bryde	Guy
Geraldine Borella	Linda/Sharon/extra
Buckley Watson	Mandy/Shazza/Annie
Nakita Growden	Jean/Michelle
Marky Baker	Alan/Alf/Burglar
Anne Bowater	Bee/Police Officer/Interviewer
Louisa Crossle'	Job Centre Crab/Police Liaison
Dale Heiner	Reg/Policeman/Drag Queen

== Principal roles and original cast ==
Original cast doing "The Full Monty"

Character	Original UK tour performer	West End performer	Second UK tour performer
Gaz	Kenny Doughty	Kenny Doughty	Gary Lucy
Horse	Sidney Cole	Sidney Cole	Louis Emerick
Lomper	Craig Gazey	Craig Gazey	Bobby Schofield
Dave	Roger Morlidge	Roger Morlidge	Martin Miller
Guy	Kieran O'Brien	Kieran O'Brien	Rupert Hill
Gerald	Simon Rouse	Simon Rouse	Andrew Dunn
Nathan	Jack Hollington; Travis Caddy; Jay Olpin; Ewan Revill	Jack Hollington; Harry Gilby; Louis Healy	Raif Clarke; Fraser Kelly; Evan McKevitt; Cameron Stenhouse
Mandy	Caroline Carver	Caroline Carver	Jo Mousley
Barry/Terry	Scott Anson	Scott Anson	Stephen Donald
Alan/Alf/Jeremiah	Ian Mercer	Ian Mercer	
Jean	Rachel Lumberg	Rachel Lumberg	
Linda/Sharon/Annie	Tracy Brabin	Tracy Brabin	
Bee/Job Club Employee/Michelle	Elaine Glover	Elaine Glover	
Brian/Reg/Man 1/Policeman	Eamonn Fleming	Eamonn Fleming	

Character	UK Tour Performers 2014/2015
Barry/Terry	Stephen Donald
Alan/Alf/Reg	David MacCreedy
Jean/Social Worker	Liz Carney
Sharon/Job Club Employee/Michelle	Laura Mould
Linda/Bee/Annie	Kate Wood
Brian/Police Sergeant	Alan McSorley
Policeman	Philip Knight

Character	UK Tour Performers 2016/2017
Gaz	Gary Lucy
Dave	Kai Owen
Gerald	Andrew Dunn
Lomper	Anthony Lewis
Guy	Chris Fountain
Horse	Louis Emerick
Nathan	James Burton; Monty Poole; Reiss Ward; Felix Yates
Barry/Terry	Jonathan McGarrity
Alan/Alf/Reg	William Ilkley
Jean	Fiona Skinner
Mandy	Charlotte Powell
Sharon/Job Club Employee/Michelle/Social Worker	Jess Schofield
Linda/Bee/Annie	Pauline Fleming
Brian/Police Sergeant	Andrew Ashford
Policeman	Adam Beresford

Character	UK Tour Performers 2023/2024
Gaz	Danny Boy Hatchard
Dave	Neil Hurst
Gerald	Bill Ward
Lomper	Nicholas Prasad
Guy	Jake Quickenden
Horse	Ben Onwukwe
Mandy / Michelle	Laura Matthews
Jean	Katy Dean
Linda/ Bee / Annie	Suzanne Procter
Sharon / Job Club Employee / WPC Baxter	Alice Schofield
Barry / Terry / Interviewer 1 / Man 1 / Dance student	Oliver Joseph Brooke
Alan / Alf / Reg	Adam Porter Smith
Brian	Leyon Stolz-Hunter
Phil	Danny Mellor

== Awards and nominations ==
=== London production ===
Year	Award	Category	Nominee	Result	Ref
2013	UK Theatre Awards	Best Touring Production		Won	
2014	Laurence Olivier Award	Best New Comedy		Nominated	
