= Art (play) =

1994 play by Yasmina Reza

'Art'
- Original language: French
- Written by: Yasmina Reza
- Genre: Comedy
- Setting: The Paris apartments of Serge, Marc, and Yvan

Premiere
- Date: 28 October 1994
- Place: Comédie des Champs-Élysées, Paris

'Art' is a French-language play by Yasmina Reza that premiered in 1994 at Comédie des Champs-Élysées in Paris. The play subsequently ran in London in 1996 and on Broadway in 1998.

== Overview ==
The comedy, which raises questions about art and friendship, concerns three long-time friends, Serge, Marc, and Yvan. Serge, indulging his penchant for modern art, buys a large, expensive, completely white painting, with some slightly less-white lines. Marc is horrified that Serge would waste such money on this, and their relationship suffers considerable strain as a result of their differing opinions about what constitutes "art". Their troubled friend, Yvan, finds himself caught in the middle of the conflict. He attempts to please and mollify both of them, but this only serves to make things worse.

The play is not divided into acts and scenes in the traditional manner, but it does nevertheless fall into sections (numbered 1–17 by Pigeat). Some of these are dialogues between two characters, several are monologues where one of the characters addresses the audience directly, and one is a conversation among all three. At the beginning and end of the play, and for most of the scenes set in Serge's flat, the large white painting is on prominent display.

== Plot ==
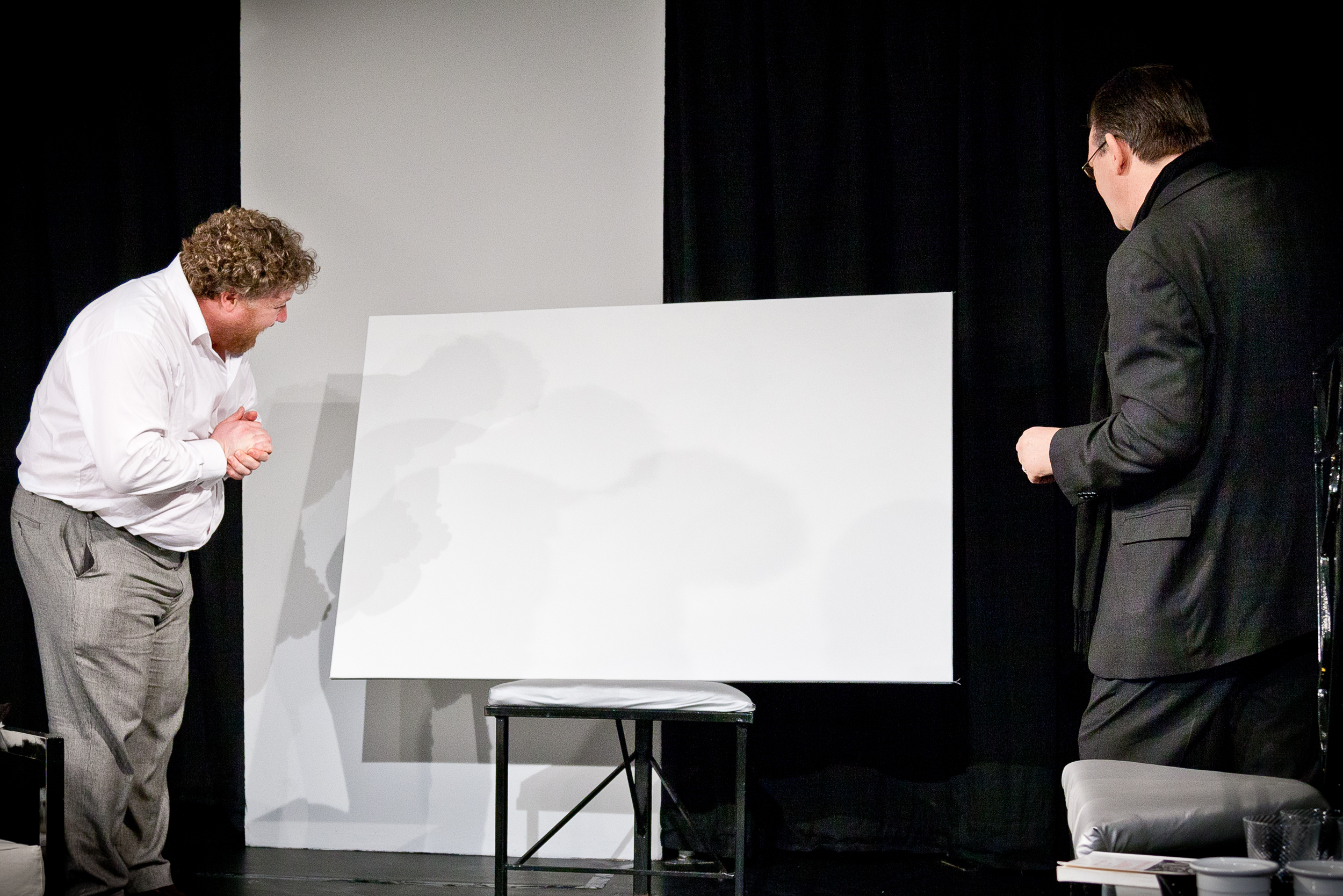
Serge and Marc inspect the white painting in a 2011 production by OVO theatre company, St Albans, UK.

Set in Paris, the play revolves around three friends—Serge, Marc and Yvan—who find their previously solid 15-year friendship on shaky ground when Serge buys an expensive painting. The canvas is white, with several fine white lines.

Marc, appalled to hear that Serge had paid two hundred thousand francs, scornfully describes it as "a piece of white shit". Serge argues that the painting, created by a reputable artist, is worth its hefty price, but Marc remains unconvinced.

Serge and Marc confide in Yvan about their disagreement. Yvan, who is engaged but conflicted over his forthcoming wedding, remains neutral and attempts to smooth things over. To Serge, Yvan comments politely on the painting but admits that he does not grasp the essence of it. To Marc, Yvan laughs at the painting's price but suggests that the work is not quite meaningless. Yvan's vacillations only fuel the disagreement as his friends criticize his timid neutrality.

Several nights later the three meet for dinner, and an all-out argument rapidly develops with each using the painting as an excuse to criticise the others over perceived failures. Marc attacks Yvan for never expressing any substantial opinions, and for being an "arse-licker" in the ongoing conflict between his fiancée, his in-laws, and his mother. Marc and Serge argue that Yvan should call off the marriage, to which Yvan responds with lame excuses. Serge criticizes Marc's unwillingness to accept that his friends’ opinions differ from his own; and he reveals that he has for some time despised Marc's girlfriend.

Marc finally admits that his true resentment is not the painting itself but the uncharacteristic independence of thought that the purchase reveals in Serge. He recalls that Serge used to share his own views on arts and culture, and he feels abandoned now that Serge has developed his own, modern taste. Marc says that friends must always influence each other, but Serge finds that view to be possessive and controlling. Yvan, at last defending himself, sobbingly explains that he tries to be tolerant and agreeable because he values companionship over dominance: their friendship is his only sanctuary in his burdensome life.

After Yvan's outburst, the friends calm down. The argument wordlessly settles as Serge allows Marc to deface the painting using a blue felt-tip pen. Marc draws a person skiing along one of the white lines on the painting. Serge and Marc agree to attempt to rebuild their friendship, and they begin by washing the pen marks off the painting. Marc asks Serge whether he had known that the ink was washable; Serge replies that he had not. But he had indeed known that, and feels troubled about his lie. Marc concludes by describing his own interpretation of the painting: it is of a man who moves across the canvas and disappears.

== Productions ==
The play premiered on 28 October 1994 at the Comédie des Champs-Élysées in Paris. Directed by Patrice Kerbrat, it starred Pierre Vaneck, Fabrice Luchini and Pierre Arditi. From 1997-98, Vaneck was joined by Jean-Louis Trintignant and Jean Rochefort.

The English-language adaptation, translated by Christopher Hampton and directed by Matthew Warchus, opened in London's West End on 15 October 1996 at Wyndham's Theatre (moving to the Whitehall Theatre in October 2001). The play initially starred Albert Finney, Tom Courtenay and Ken Stott; other actors who appeared during the run included Henry Goodman, Roger Allam, Stacy Keach, George Wendt, David Dukes, Paul Freeman, Edward Woodward, Peter Egan, Art Malik, John Fortune, Ken Campbell, Warren Mitchell, Stephen Tompkinson, Michael French, James Fleet, Nigel Havers, Roger Lloyd-Pack and Barry Foster. Produced by David Pugh and Dafydd Rogers and Sean Connery, the show ran for over six years, closing on 3 January 2003. The final West End cast comprised Reece Shearsmith, Steve Pemberton and Mark Gatiss (aka The League of Gentlemen).

'Art' played on Broadway at New York City's Royale Theatre from 12 February 1998 to 8 August 1999, again directed by Warchus and produced by Pugh and Rogers and Connery, plus Joan Cullman. The original cast featured Alan Alda, Victor Garber and Alfred Molina; the latter was nominated for a Tony Award for Best Actor in a Play. 'Art' won the Tony for Best Play and ran for 600 performances. Among the actors who took over in the production were Brian Cox, Henry Goodman, David Haig, Buck Henry, Judd Hirsch, John DeLancie, Joe Morton, Wayne Knight, George Segal and George Wendt.

From December 2016 to February 2017, the play, directed once again by Matthew Warchus, was revived at London's Old Vic theatre in order to celebrate its 20th anniversary, starring Rufus Sewell (Serge), Tim Key (Yvan) and Paul Ritter (Marc). It then toured the UK from February 2018, starring Nigel Havers (Serge), Denis Lawson (Marc) and Stephen Tompkinson (Yvan).

In May 2024, Rialto Productions staged the play as part of the Brighton Fringe Festival, receiving a 'Must See' rating.

In October 2024, a production directed by Iqbal Khan toured the UK starring Aden Gillett (Serge), Chris Harper (Marc) and Seann Walsh (Yvan).

A Broadway revival opened at the Music Box Theatre in August 2025, and was scheduled to run to December 2025. Bobby Cannavale (Marc), James Corden (Yvan) and Neil Patrick Harris (Serge) star, with Scott Ellis directing.

An Australian production, starring Richard Roxburgh, Damon Herriman, and Toby Schmitz, ran in Sydney–Brisbane–Melbourne–Adelaide from 10 February to 24 May 2026.

== Film adaptation ==
In May 2026, it was announced Fernando Meirelles was set to direct an English-language adaptation of the play starring Ralph Fiennes, Colin Farrell and Wagner Moura.

== Awards and nominations ==
=== Awards ===
- April 1995 Molière Award for Best Commercial Production
- 1997 Laurence Olivier Award for Best New Comedy
- May 1998 New York Drama Critics' Circle – Best Play
- 1998 Tony Award for Best Play
- 1998 Drama Desk Outstanding Featured Actor in a Play (Molina)
- November 1998 Evening Standard Award for Best Comedy

=== Nominations ===
- 1997 Olivier Award for Best Actor, Ken Stott
- 1997 Olivier Award for Best Director (Warchus)
- 1997 Olivier Award Best for Set Designer (Mark Thompson)
- 1997 Olivier Award for Best Lighting Designer (Hugh Vanstone)
- 1998 Tony Award Best Actor in Play (Molina)
- 1998 Tony Award Best Direction of a Play (Warchus)
- 1998 Drama Desk Award for Outstanding New Play
