= Giles Cadle =

British set designer

Giles Cadle is a British set designer. He studied architecture at Kingston, followed by a postgraduate diploma in stage design at Nottingham. He has designed sets for theatre, opera and musical productions in the UK, Germany, New Zealand, and the USA. He won an Olivier Award for his work on the National Theatre production of His Dark Materials.
