= Tony Award for Best Special Theatrical Event =

American theatre award for Broadway

- Awarded for: Best Special Theatrical Event
- Location: New York City
- Presented by: American Theatre Wing The Broadway League
- Currently held by: Liza's at The Palace...! (2009)
- Website: TonyAwards.com

The Tony Award for Best Special Theatrical Event was awarded from 2001 to 2009 to live theatrical productions that were not plays or musicals. The category was created after the 2000 controversy of Contact winning Best Musical; the show used pre-recorded music and featured no singing. The category was retired in 2009 allowing the shows that were previously eligible for it to be eligible in Best Play or Best Musical categories, if they met the proper criteria. The shows are also now eligible in other creative categories.

In 1999 and 2000 a Special Tony Award for a Live Theatrical Presentation was awarded which may be seen as the precursor of the Best Special Theatrical Event award and is generally included in this award's listing.

== Winners and nominees ==
indicates the winner

=== 1990s ===
Year	Production
1999; 53rd Tony Awards
1999; 53rd Tony Awards	Fool Moon

=== 2000s ===
Year	Production
2000; 54th Tony Awards
2000; 54th Tony Awards	Dame Edna: The Royal Tour
2001; 55th Tony Awards
2001; 55th Tony Awards	Blast!
2002; 56th Tony Awards
2002; 56th Tony Awards	Elaine Stritch at Liberty
2002; 56th Tony Awards	Bea Arthur on Broadway, Just Between Friends
2002; 56th Tony Awards	Barbara Cook in Mostly Sondheim
2002; 56th Tony Awards	Sexaholix... A Love Story
2003; 57th Tony Awards
2003; 57th Tony Awards	Def Poetry Jam
2003; 57th Tony Awards	Bill Maher: Victory Begins at Home
2003; 57th Tony Awards	The Play What I Wrote
2003; 57th Tony Awards	Prune Danish
2004; 58th Tony Awards	—N/a
2005; 59th Tony Awards
2005; 59th Tony Awards	Billy Crystal 700 Sundays
2005; 59th Tony Awards	Dame Edna: Back with a Vengeance!
2005; 59th Tony Awards	Laugh Whore
2005; 59th Tony Awards	Whoopi the 20th Anniversary Show
2006; 60th Tony Awards	—N/a
2007; 61st Tony Awards
2007; 61st Tony Awards	Jay Johnson: The Two and Only
2007; 61st Tony Awards	Kiki and Herb: Alive on Broadway
2008; 62nd Tony Awards	—N/a
2009; 63rd Tony Awards
2009; 63rd Tony Awards	Liza's at The Palace...!
2009; 63rd Tony Awards	Slava's Snowshow
2009; 63rd Tony Awards	Soul of Shaolin
2009; 63rd Tony Awards	You're Welcome America

== See also ==
- Laurence Olivier Award for Best Entertainment
- Drama Desk Award for Unique Theatrical Experience
- List of Tony Award-nominated productions
