= Derek Bond (theatre director) =

British theatre director

Derek Bond is an Olivier-award winning British theatre director and writer who has directed in the West End theatre, at the Royal Exchange Theatre, Southwark Playhouse, Soho Theatre and Watford Palace Theatre.

== Awards ==
Year	Nominee / work	Award	Result
2024	Dinosaur World Live	Olivier Award - Best Family Show	Won
2022	Dragons and Mythical Beasts	Olivier Award - Best Family Show	Nominated
2017	Sweet Charity	UK Theatre Awards - Best Musical	Nominated
2017	Sweet Charity	Manchester Theatre Awards - Best Musical	Won
2015	Little Shop of Horrors	Manchester Theatre Awards - Best Musical	Nominated
2014	As You Like It	Offie - Best Director	Nominated
2012	Floyd Collins	Evening Standard Awards, Ned Sherrin Award for Best Musical	Nominated
2012	Floyd Collins	Offie - Best Musical	Won

== Selected work ==
- Drop the Dead Donkey by Andy Hamilton and Guy Jenkin
- Dinosaur World Live by Derek Bond at the Open Air Theatre, Regent's Park
- Dragons and Mythical Beasts by Derek Bond at the Open Air Theatre, Regent's Park
- The Christmasaurus by Tom Fletcher at the Hammersmith Apollo
- Sweet Charity at the Royal Exchange, Manchester, opened on 3 December 2016.
- Jess and Joe Forever by Zoe Cooper starring Nicola Coughlan at the Orange Tree Theatre followed by a UK tour, then at the Traverse Theatre
- Stig of the Dump adapted by Jessica Swale at the Grosvenor Park Open Air Theatre
- Little Shop of Horrors at the Royal Exchange Theatre, Manchester
- Floyd Collins (musical) at Southwark Playhouse
- Many Moons by Alice Birch at Theatre503

== Roses Theatre ==
On 4th August 2025 Bond was announced as the new CEO of the Roses Theatre.
