= God of Carnage =

Literary work

God of Carnage Le Dieu du carnage
- God of Carnage original West End production poster
- Original language: French
- Written by: Yasmina Reza
- Characters: Alain Reille; Annette Reille; Véronique Houllié; Michel Houllié
- Subject: Two married couples meet to discuss a scuffle between their sons and gradually degenerate into children themselves.
- Genre: Black comedy

Premiere
- Date: 2 December 2006
- Place: Schauspielhaus Zürich

God of Carnage (originally in French Le Dieu du carnage) is a play by Yasmina Reza that was first published in 2008. It is about two sets of parents; the son of one couple has hurt the son of the other couple at a public park. The parents meet to discuss the matter in a civilized manner. However, as the evening goes on, the parents become increasingly childish and the meeting devolves into chaos. Originally written in French, the play was translated into English by translator Christopher Hampton, and has enjoyed acclaim in productions in the West End and on Broadway.

== Plot ==
Before the play begins, two 11-year-old children, Ferdinand Reille and Bruno Vallon (Benjamin and Henry in the Broadway production), get involved in an argument because Bruno refuses to let Ferdinand join his 'gang'. Ferdinand knocks out two of Bruno's teeth with a stick. That night, the parents of both children meet to discuss the matter. Ferdinand's father, Alain (Alan in the Broadway production), is a lawyer who is never off his mobile phone. Ferdinand's mother, Annette is in "wealth management" (her husband's wealth, to be precise), and consistently wears good shoes. Bruno's father, Michel (Michael in the Broadway production), is a self-made wholesaler with an unwell mother. Michel's wife, Véronique (Veronica in the Broadway production), is writing a book about Darfur. As the evening goes on, the meeting degenerates into the four getting into irrational arguments, and their discussion falls into the loaded topics of sexism, racial prejudice and homophobia. One of the central dramatic moments of the play occurs when Annette vomits on stage, all over the coffee table and books.

== Cast ==
Character	West End debut 2008	Broadway debut 2009	Film adaptation 2011
Alan	Ralph Fiennes	Jeff Daniels	Christoph Waltz
Annette	Tamsin Greig	Hope Davis	Kate Winslet
Michael	Ken Stott	James Gandolfini	John C. Reilly
Veronica	Janet McTeer	Marcia Gay Harden	Jodie Foster

== Production history ==
=== Original London production ===
Christopher Hampton's English translation of the play was first presented in a UK Premiere at the Gielgud Theatre in London's West End on 25 March 2008. This production was produced by Dafydd Rogers and David Pugh and directed by Matthew Warchus and starred Ralph Fiennes, Tamsin Greig, Janet McTeer and Ken Stott. On the opening night of the performance, there was a power failure about an hour into the show. The show therefore had to continue in emergency lighting. The London production was widely acclaimed, receiving the Olivier Award for Best New Play of the year.

=== 2009 Broadway production ===
After some minor changes to the English script to accommodate American audiences, a Broadway production opened at the Bernard B. Jacobs Theatre in previews on February 28, 2009, and officially on March 22, 2009. Originally planned for a limited engagement to close July 19, 2009, the run was extended through February 28, 2010 before converting to an open-ended run. From July 27, 2009 to September 8, 2009, the play was suspended to allow the principal cast to tie up prior engagements before returning to fulfill their contracts. Directed once again by Matthew Warchus, the original cast included Jeff Daniels, Hope Davis, James Gandolfini and Marcia Gay Harden. All four actors were nominated for Tony Awards for their performances. Harden won the Tony for Best Leading Actress in a Play. The Broadway production closed on June 6, 2010 playing 24 previews and 452 regular performances. It is the third-longest running play of the 2000s (after The 39 Steps and August: Osage County). While receiving mostly positive reviews, the play has also generated some negative reactions. Brendan Lemon of the Financial Times called the play "this piece of shallow arrogance", adding, "I detest the pathetic complicity between this author and her audiences... when I left the theatre, I thought: I’ll never laugh again." Broadway cast replacements include Ken Stott (who had starred in the London production), Christine Lahti, Jimmy Smits, Annie Potts (making her Broadway debut), Jeff Daniels (returning in the role of Michael and not his original role, Alan), Janet McTeer (who had starred in the London production), Dylan Baker, Lucy Liu (in her Broadway debut).

The production was remounted in 2011 as a one-off engagement for Center Theatre Group at the Ahmanson Theatre in Los Angeles, running for eight weeks from April 5, 2011 to May 29, 2011 (extended from the originally announced six-week run). The original Broadway cast reprised their original roles. The production broke every box office record set at the time for a play at the Ahmanson Theatre, selling 97,567 tickets and grossing nearly $8 million in eight weeks.

=== Other productions ===
The German-language premiere took place on December 2, 2006 at the Schauspielhaus Zürich with Dörte Lyssewski as Véronique Houillé, Tilo Nest as Michel Houillé, Corinna Kirchhoff as Annette Reille and Michael Maertens as Alain Reille. The play was directed by Jürgen Gosch.

The Slovenian premiere took place in 2007 at the National Theatre in Ljubljana. The play was directed by Janusz Kica.

The play was produced in French for the first time with a premiere on January 25, 2008, at the Théâtre Antoine in Paris. The actors were Isabelle Huppert as Véronique Houllié, André Marcon as Michel Houllié, Valérie Bonneton as Annette Reille and Éric Elmosnino as Alain Reille. The director was the playwright herself, Yasmina Reza.

In Spain, the play was released on October 2, 2008 at the Alcázar Theatre in Madrid, starring Maribel Verdú, Aitana Sánchez-Gijón, Antonio Molero and Pere Ponce. For their performances, they won and were nominated for numerous awards.

The Croatian premiere took place in 2008 at the National Theatre in Split. The play was directed by Nenni Delmestre. The second Croatian production took place in 2009 at Theatre Rugantino in Zagreb. The play was directed by Franka Perkovic.

In Serbia, the premiere of the play was in December 2008 at Atelje 212 in Belgrade. It was directed by Alisa Stojanović and starred Dušanka Stojanović, Tihomir Stanić, Jelena Đokić and Svetozar Cvetković.

The Sydney premiere took place on 3 October 2009 at the Sydney Opera House Drama Theatre. It was directed by Gale Edwards and starred Russell Dykstra, Sacha Horler, Marcus Graham, and Helen Thomson. The designer was Brian Thomson.

The Romanian premiere took place in 2010 at the Comedy Theater (Teatrul de Comedie) in Bucharest. The play was directed by Lucian Giurchescu, and the actors were Delia Nartea/Teodora Stanciu, Tania Popa, Marius Drogeanu and Alexandru Conovaru.

The Irish premiere took place in February 2011 at the Gate Theatre, Dublin starring Maura Tierney, Ardal O'Hanlon, Owen Roe and Donna Dent, and directed by Alan Stanford.

It premiered in Chicago at the Goodman Theatre in March 2011, directed by Rick Snyder and starring David Pasquesi. The play also had a run at the Guthrie Theatre in Minneapolis, Minnesota.

God of Carnage had its Puerto Rican premiere on November 4, 2011 at the Tapia Theatre in San Juan starring Cordelia Gonzalez, Braulio Castillo, Jr., René Monclova and Luisa de los Ríos, and directed by Alina Marrero.

A Flemish version called "God van de slachting" in Dutch, toured Flanders, Belgium in 2012. It was directed by acclaimed television director Jan Eelen and starred Els Dottermans, Frank Focketyn, An Miller and Oscar Van Rompay. The tour was hugely successful, mainly thanks to the fame of the director. The Raamtheater had previously performed the play, but their version was less successful.

In March 2013 "Un Dios Salvaje" premiered in Chile at Centro Mori Parque Arauco theatre, starring Blanca Lewin, Alvaro Espinoza, Ingrid Cruz and Elvis Fuentes, directed by Andrés Céspedes and produced by The Cow Company.

The United Arab Emirates premiere took place in Dubai in April 2013 with Director Nina Hein, at the Jam Jar. Actors were Russell Bell (Michael), Brook Butterworth (Annette), Mike Green (Alan) and Sophie Paris (Veronica).

A new production of the Christopher Hampton English translation was part of the 2018 summer season at the Theatre Royal, Bath. Directed by Lindsay Posner, it starred Elizabeth McGovern, Amanda Abbington, Nigel Lindsay, and Ralf Little.

God of Carnage was performed at Brighton Fringe in 2022 by Pretty Villain Productions at The Rialto Theatre, receiving an 'Outstanding' review.

An Off-Broadway revival took place at Theatre Row in NYC. Previews began on April 18, 2023 with opening night on April 27, 2023. David Burtka, Carey Cox, Gabe Fazio and Christiane Noll starred.

A revival was staged at the Lyric Theatre (Hammersmith), opening on 1 September 2023. Directed by Nicholai La Barrie, the cast featured Freema Agyeman as Veronica, Martin Hutson as Michael, Ariyon Bakare as Alan and Dinita Gohil as Annette.

A newly translated Dutch version, also titled "God van de slachting", just as the Flemish production, premiered on 22 January 2026, and is expected to tour the Netherlands until 15 May 2026. It stars Remko Vrijdag, Rosa da Silva, Johan Goossens and Yara Alink.

== Film adaptation ==
Roman Polanski directed the 2011 film adaption of God of Carnage, whose title was shortened to Carnage. The film was shot in Paris due to Polanski's outstanding criminal conviction for rape in the United States. Jodie Foster and John C. Reilly play Penelope and Michael and Christoph Waltz and Kate Winslet play Alan and Nancy.

== Awards and nominations ==
=== Original London production ===
Year	Award	Category	Nominee	Result
2009	Laurence Olivier Awards	Best Comedy	Yasmina Reza	Won

=== Original Broadway production ===
Year	Award	Category	Nominee	Result
2009	Tony Awards	Best Play	Yasmina Reza	Won
2009	Tony Awards	Best Actor in a Play	Jeff Daniels	Nominated
2009	Tony Awards	Best Actor in a Play	James Gandolfini	Nominated
2009	Tony Awards	Best Actress in a Play	Marcia Gay Harden	Won
2009	Tony Awards	Best Actress in a Play	Hope Davis	Nominated
2009	Tony Awards	Best Director of a Play	Matthew Warchus	Won
2009	Drama Desk Awards	Drama Desk Award for Outstanding Actress in a Play	Marcia Gay Harden	Nominated

=== Original Madrid production ===
Year	Award	Category	Nominee	Result
2008	Fotogramas de Plata Award	Best Actress	Maribel Verdú	Nominated
2008	Valle-Inclán Award	Best Performance	Aitana Sánchez-Gijón	Nominated
2008	Valle-Inclán Award	Best Performance	Maribel Verdú	Nominated
