= Yasmina Reza =

French actor and writer (born 1959)

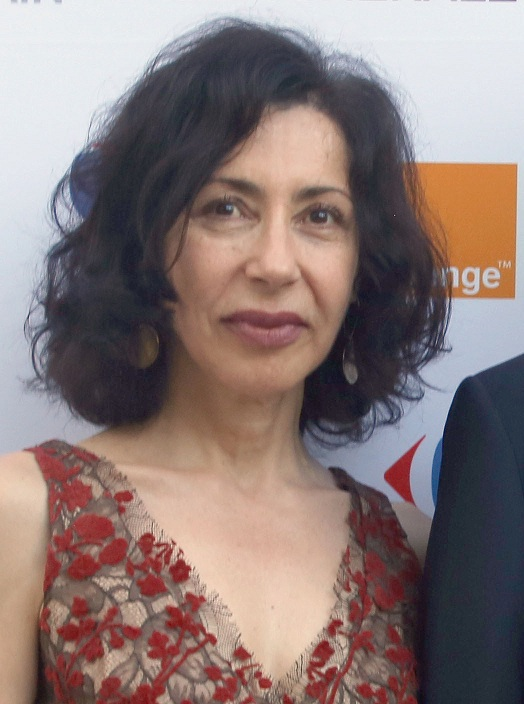
- Yasmina Reza in 2014
- Born: 1 May 1959 (age 67); Paris, France
- Education: École Internationale de Théâtre Jacques Lecoq
- Occupations: Writer; actress
- Children: 2
- Writing career
- Language: French
- Notable works: Art (1994); God of Carnage (2008)

Yasmina Reza (French: [ʁeza]; born 1 May 1959) is a French playwright, actress, novelist and screenwriter best known for her plays 'Art' and God of Carnage. Many of her brief satiric plays have reflected on contemporary middle-class issues. The 2011 black comedy film Carnage, directed by Roman Polanski, was based on Reza's Tony Award-winning 2006 play God of Carnage.

== Life and career ==
Reza was born on 1 May 1959. Her father was a Russian-born Persian Jew engineer, businessman, and pianist, and her mother was a Jewish Hungarian violinist from Budapest. During the Nazi occupation, her father was deported from Nice to Drancy internment camp. At the beginning of her career, Reza acted in several new plays as well as in plays by Molière and Pierre de Marivaux.

In 1987, she wrote Conversations after a Burial, which won the Molière Award, the French equivalent of the Tony Award, for Best Author. The North American production premiered in February 2013 at Players by the Sea in Jacksonville Beach, Florida. Holly Gutshall and Joe Schwarz directed; with Set Design by Anne Roberts. The cast for this US debut was Kevin Bodge, Paul Carelli, Karen Overstreet, Dave Gowan, Holly Gutshall and Olivia Gowan Snell. Reza translated Roman Polanski's stage version of Kafka's Metamorphosis in the late 1980s. Her second play, Winter Crossing, won the 1990 Molière Award for Best Fringe Production, and her next play, The Unexpected Man, enjoyed successful productions in England, France, Scandinavia, Germany and New York.

In 1994, 'Art' premiered in Paris and went on to win the Molière Award for Best Author. Since then it has been produced internationally and translated and performed in over 30 languages. The London production, produced by David Pugh and Dafydd Rogers, received the 1996–97 Laurence Olivier Award and Evening Standard Award, the former is the British equivalent of the Tony's. It also won the Tony Award for Best Play. Life X 3 has also been produced in Europe, North America and Australia. Screenwriting credits include See You Tomorrow, starring Jeanne Moreau and directed by Reza's then-partner Didier Martiny.

In September 1997, her first novel, Hammerklavier, was published and another work of fiction, Une Désolation, was published in 2001. Her 2007 work L'Aube le Soir ou la Nuit (Dawn Evening or Night), written after a year of following the campaign of Nicolas Sarkozy, caused a sensation in France.

On 24 November 2007, her play Le Dieu du Carnage (God of Carnage), directed by Jürgen Gosch and performed first in Zürich, received the Viennese Nestroy Theatre Prize for the best German-language performance of the season. It opened in London in March 2008, directed by Matthew Warchus in a translation by Christopher Hampton starring Ralph Fiennes, Tamsin Greig, Janet McTeer and Ken Stott. It was produced once again by David Pugh and Dafydd Rogers. The London production won the Laurence Olivier Award for Best New Comedy, which Hampton accepted on her behalf. Hampton told the audience that Reza would be thrilled by the win. The play premiered on Broadway with an opening night cast of James Gandolfini, Jeff Daniels, Marcia Gay Harden, and Hope Davis. God of Carnage won Best Play at the 2009 Tony Awards.

In collaboration with Polanski, Reza wrote the screenplay adaptation of her own play God of Carnage for the 2011 Polanski film Carnage. She was nominated at the European Film Awards and won a César Award for her screenwriting and the film won a Little Gold Lion at the 68th Venice International Film Festival.

Her 2016 novel, Babylone, received the Prix Renaudot. The English version, translated by Linda Asher, was published by Seven Stories Press in 2018.

== Awards and honours ==
- 1987 Molière Award for Best Author (Conversations After a Burial)
- 1988 Molière Award for Translation (Metamorphosis)
- 1990 Molière Award for Best Fringe Production (Winter Crossing)
- 1994 Molière Award for Best Author, Best Play and Best Production (Art)
- 1998 Laurence Olivier Award for Best Comedy (Art)
- 1998 Tony for Best Play (Art)
- 2000 Grand Prix du Théâtre de l’Académie Française
- 2005 Welt-Literaturpreis
- 2009 Laurence Olivier Award for Best Comedy (God of Carnage)
- 2009 Tony for Best Play (God of Carnage)
- 2012 Cinema Writers Circle Award (Spain) for Best Screenplay (Adapted), for Carnage
- 2012 César Award (France) for Best Screenplay (Adapted), for Carnage
- 2016 Prix Renaudot, Babylone
- 2020 Prix Jonathan Swift
- 2021 Premio Malaparte
- 2024 Prix mondial Cino Del Duca

== Works ==
=== Plays ===
- Conversations après un enterrement (1987). Conversations After a Burial, trans. Christopher Hampton (2000).
- La Traversée de l'hiver (1989). The Passage of Winter.
- « Art » (1994). 'Art', trans. Christopher Hampton (1997).
- L'Homme du hasard (1995). The Unexpected Man, trans. Christopher Hampton (1997).
- Trois versions de la vie (2000). Life x 3, trans. Christopher Hampton (2003).
- Une pièce espagnole (2004). A Spanish Play.
- Le Dieu du Carnage (2006). God of Carnage, trans. Christopher Hampton (2007).
- Bella figura (2015).

=== Novels ===
- Hammerklavier (1997), trans. Carol Cosman in collaboration with Catherine McMillan (2000).
- Une désolation (1999). Desolation, trans. C. Brown Janeway (2002).
- Adam Haberberg (2003), trans. Geoffrey Strachan (2007).
- Nulle part (2005), untranslated.
- L'Aube le soir ou la nuit (2007). Dawn Dusk or Night: My Year With Nicolas Sarkozy, trans. Yasmina Reza and Pierre Guglielmina (2008).
- Heureux les heureux (2013). Happy Are the Happy, trans. John Cullen (US), Sarah Ardizzone (UK) (2015).
- Babylone (2016). Babylon, trans. Linda Asher (2018).
- Anne-Marie la Beauté (2020). Anne-Marie the Beauty, trans. Alison L. Strayer (2021).
- Serge (2021), trans. Jeffrey Zuckerman (2025).
- Récits de certains faits (2024), untranslated.

=== Screenplays ===
- Jusqu'à la nuit (1983). Till Night.
- Le Pique-nique de Lulu Kreutz (2000). Lulu Kreutz's Picnic.
- Chicas (2010). Both screenwriter and director.
- Carnage (2011).

=== As actor ===
- Que les gros salaires lèvent le doigt ! (1982). Let the Fat Cats Lift a Finger!
- Jusqu'à la nuit (1983). Till Night.
- À demain (1991). Till Tomorrow.
- Loin (2001). Faraway.
