= Noël Coward Theatre =

West End theatre in London

- New Theatre; Albery Theatre
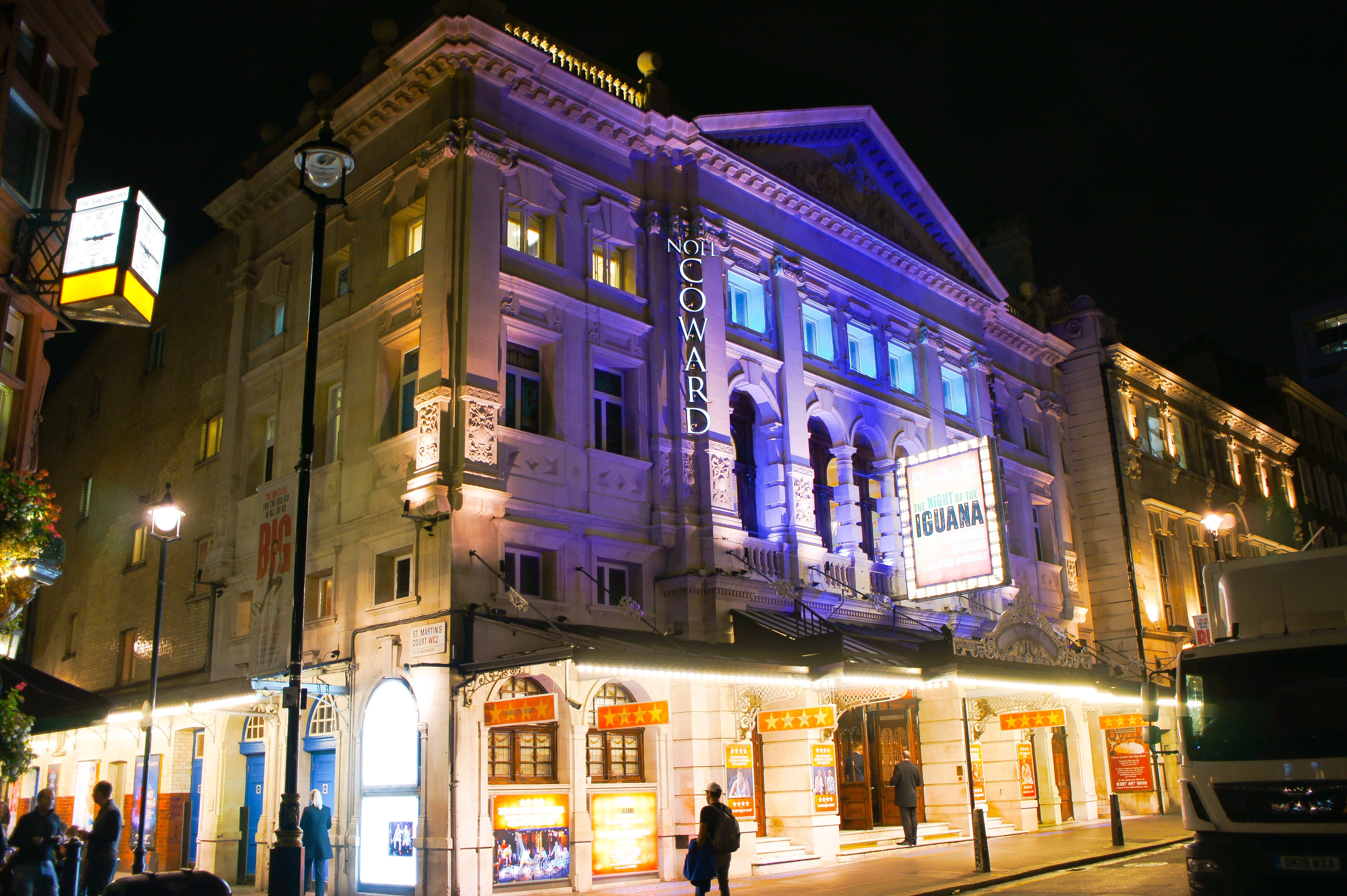
- Noël Coward Theatre in 2019
- Interactive map of Noël Coward Theatre
- Address: St Martin's Lane; London, WC2; United Kingdom
- Coordinates: 51.511111°N 0.127222°W
- Owner: Salisbury estate
- Operator: Delfont Mackintosh Theatres
- Capacity: 942 on 4 levels
- Type: West End theatre
- Designation: Grade II listed
- Production: Into the Woods
- Public transit: Leicester Square

Construction
- Opened: 1903; 123 years ago
- Architect: W. G. R. Sprague

Website
- Official website at Delfont Mackintosh Theatres

The Noël Coward Theatre, formerly known as the Albery Theatre, is a West End theatre in St. Martin's Lane in the City of Westminster, London. It opened on 12 March 1903 as the New Theatre and was built by Sir Charles Wyndham behind Wyndham's Theatre which was completed in 1899. The building was designed by the architect W. G. R. Sprague with an exterior in the classical style and an interior in the Rococo style.

In 1973, it was renamed the Albery Theatre in tribute to Sir Bronson Albery who had presided as its manager for many years. Since September 2005, the theatre has been owned by Delfont-Mackintosh Ltd. It underwent major refurbishment in 2006 and was renamed the Noël Coward Theatre when it re-opened on 1 June 2006. The building is a Grade II Listed structure.

== History ==
=== Early years, 1903–1919 ===
The New was the second of the three theatres in St Martin's Lane. The Trafalgar Square (now the Tom Stoppard Theatre, formerly the Duke of York's) opened in 1892 and the London Coliseum in 1904. The actor-manager Charles Wyndham, who had been based at the Criterion Theatre for more than twenty years, moved in 1899 to the larger Wyndham's Theatre which he commissioned in Charing Cross Road. To build Wyndham's, he had been obliged to buy a larger parcel of land than he required, and in 1901 he was in negotiations to sell the area he did not need. When negotiations fell through, he decided to build another theatre on the vacant site. This plot fronting on St Martin's Lane is bounded on one side by St Martin's Court, which also runs behind the theatre. While the theatre was in planning and then under construction it was referred to simply as "the new theatre", and the name stuck. The street adjacent to it is called New Row.

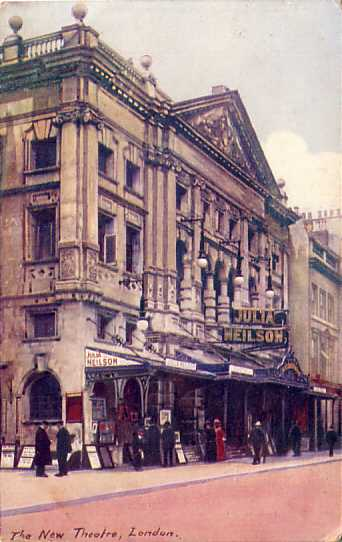
New Theatre, postcard, circa 1905

The theatre, like Wyndham's, was designed by the architect W.G.R. Sprague, and was the thirtieth theatre he designed. A contemporary report described the front elevation as "of the free classic order … at once dignified and effective". As at Wyndhams, the auditorium is constructed on the cantilever principle, rendering columns unnecessary and ensuring unimpeded views. The internal decoration was based on French designs from the 18th century. Over the Proscenium there is a gilt trophy emblematic of peace and music.

The New Theatre opened on 12 March 1903 with a brief season consisting of a revival of Rosemary – a play by Louis N. Parker and Murray Carson, starring Wyndham and his partner (later wife) Mary Moore – and a special matinée of Wyndham's best-known production, David Garrick. The following month Johnston Forbes-Robertson transferred his production of The Light that Failed from the Lyric, after which there were seasons featuring Mrs Patrick Campbell and then Cyril Maude. Fred Terry and Julia Neilson played an annual season of about six months at the New from 1905 to 1913, including many revivals of their great success, The Scarlet Pimpernel. Between these seasons, productions at the New Theatre included Amasis, a comic opera by Frederick Fenn and Philip Michael Faraday (1906), with Ruth Vincent, and Count Hannibal (1910). In 1911, Terry presented As You Like It and Romeo and Juliet to introduce his daughter Phyllis to the stage. Between then and the First World War, the theatre featured comedies and musical comedies.

Dion Boucicault Jr., became manager in December 1915 and opened with a revival of Peter Pan, revived each Christmas season until 1919. He produced a series of successes including new plays by Somerset Maugham, J. M. Barrie, Arthur Wing Pinero and A.A. Milne. Leon M. Lion presented a season in 1918–19 in which Katharine Cornell made her only appearance on the London stage, playing Jo in a dramatisation of Little Women.

=== 1920s ===
Noël Coward and Esmé Wynne in Coward's I'll Leave It to You, 1920

I'll Leave It to You, in 1920, was Noël Coward's first staged play, and ran at the New for 37 performances. Matheson Lang was associated with the New for several years, presenting and playing in Shakespeare and modern dramas. The London premiere of Bernard Shaw's St. Joan starring Sybil Thorndike followed in 1924.

In July 1925, Robert Atkins took over management of the New, presenting Israel Zangwill's We Moderns. The following year and for most of 1927 the New was home to a dramatisation of Margaret Kennedy's The Constant Nymph, which ran for 587 performances, starring first Coward and then the young John Gielgud as Lewis Dodd. Towards the end of the decade, two comedies by P. G. Wodehouse and Ian Hay – A Damsel in Distress (1928), and Baa Baa Black Sheep (1929) ran for 234 and 115 performances respectively.

=== 1930s ===
In February 1933, Gielgud began a period of management at the theatre. He produced and starred in Gordon Daviot's, Richard of Bordeaux, which ran for 472 performances. He followed this in June 1934 with the same author's Queen of Scots starring Gwen Ffrangcon-Davies, which ran for 106 performances. In November 1934, he presented Hamlet, which ran for 155 performances. After works by Hugh Walpole and Andre Obey, Gielgud presented a revival of Romeo and Juliet which had the longest run on record for that play: 186 performances. Peggy Ashcroft played Juliet and Edith Evans was the Nurse; Laurence Olivier played Romeo, and Gielgud Mercutio for the first part of the run and then exchanged roles. Gielgud concluded with Chekhov's The Seagull, directed by Theodore Komisarjevsky, a production that, according to The Times showed the play as "among the supreme masterpieces of the theatre". After Gielgud's tenure, there was more Shakespeare at the New: As You Like with Edith Evans and Michael Redgrave; The Taming of the Shrew with Evans and Leslie Banks; and Macbeth with Olivier and Judith Anderson (all 1937).

=== 1940s ===
During the Second World War, The Old Vic was badly damaged by German bombs, and Sadler's Wells Theatre was requisitioned as a refuge for those made homeless by air-raids. The drama company of the former and the opera and ballet companies of the latter toured nationally throughout the war, and Bronson Albery, stepson of Charles Wyndham through Mary Moore, managing director of the New Theatre, made it available to all three companies as a London base, although in practice the Old Vic company occupied the theatre more than the Sadler's Wells companies. The theatre historians Mander and Mitchenson single out productions of The Beggar's Opera, King John. The Cherry Orchard and Hamlet (with Robert Helpmann in the title role). In 1944, with the end of the war in sight, a reconstituted Old Vic company took possession of the New, starring Ralph Richardson, Olivier and Thorndike. The repertory that year comprised Ibsen's Peer Gynt, Shaw's Arms and the Man, Shakespeare's Richard III and Chekhov's Uncle Vanya. Between Old Vic seasons, Robert Morley and Wendy Hiller starred in a Regency drama, The First Gentleman, which ran for 654 performances. The 1945 Old Vic company season added Henry IV, Parts I and II and a celebrated double bill of Oedipus and The Critic. In September 1946, King Lear and Cyrano de Bergerac were staged. Under a different management, Aldous Huxley's The Gioconda Smile was a success in 1948–49, running for 655 performances.

=== 1950s and 1960s ===
In 1950, The Cocktail Party by T.S. Eliot began a run of 325 performances. From later in the decade, Mander and Mitchenson single out Vivian Ellis's musical version of J. B. Fagan's And So to Bed (1951, 323 performances); The Young Elizabeth (1952, 498 performances); Katharine Hepburn in Shaw's The Millionairess (1952); Yvonne Arnaud in Dear Charles (1952, 466 performances); Dorothy Tutin in I Am a Camera (1954, 343 performances); a comedy about bigamy, The Remarkable Mr Pennypacker (1955, 421 performances); Leslie Caron in Colette's Gigi (1956); Under Milk Wood (1956, 250 performances); Summer of the Seventeenth Doll (1957); Charles Laughton in The Party (1958); The Rose Tattoo (1959); Peter O'Toole in The Long and the Short and the Tall (1959); and the Theatre Royal Stratford East's Make Me an Offer (1959).

In June 1960, Oliver!, the Lionel Bart musical based on Oliver Twist, was first produced, and ran until September 1966, a total of 2,618 performances. The Times reported that its run had broken the previous West End records – My Fair Lady (2,282) and Salad Days (2,283). The last years of the decade brought shorter runs to the New. They included Jorrocks, a musical (1967, 181 performances); Gwen Watford and Gemma Jones in Howards End (1967, 137); Roy Dotrice playing multiple roles in the comedy World War 2 (1967, 166); the Prospect Theatre Company's production of Farquhar's The Constant Couple; Spring and Port Wine; Paul Scofield in John Osborne's The Hotel in Amsterdam; the controversial Soldiers by Rolf Hochhuth in December 1968, and in April 1969 Anne of Green Gables, a new musical with Polly James in the lead.

=== 1970s onward ===
A 1970 Royal Shakespeare Company production of Dion Boucicault's London Assurance, directed by Ronald Eyre, with Donald Sinden as Sir Harcourt Courtly, Roger Rees as Charles, Judi Dench as Grace and Dinsdale Landen as Dazzle, transferred to the New Theatre in 1972 for a year, prior to its 1974 run in New York. (Sinden received the 1975 Drama Desk Special Award for the Broadway run.) A revival of Oliver! ran from 1977 to 1980

In 1981, Children of a Lesser God won the Olivier Awards (then known as the Society of West End Theatre Awards) for Best New Play and for actors Trevor Eve and Elizabeth Quinn.

Among some of the 1990s productions was the 1994 revival of Turgenev's A Month in the Country starring Helen Mirren and John Hurt. In the 2000s the theatre played host to several Shakespeare productions including a production of Twelfth Night set in India with an entirely Asian cast. The production played to packed houses and only closed as the Royal Shakespeare Company themselves had exclusive rights to perform their annual London season of Tragedies there. Between December 2004 and April 2005, they presented Hamlet, Romeo & Juliet, Macbeth, King Lear and a brand new production of Euripides' Hecuba starring Vanessa Redgrave. On 8 June 2005, Dion Boucicault's Victorian melodrama The Shaughraun opened; however, its success at the Dublin Gate Theatre was not repeated in London and it closed on 30 July. A dark period of around three months followed before the theatre was transferred to the ownership of Delfont Mackintosh Limited and reopened in October 2005 with The Right Size's new production Ducktastic!. Once again this failed to live up to expectations and closed just three weeks after opening on 19 November 2005. A short Christmas season of Patrick Stewart's one-man version of Charles Dickens' A Christmas Carol played from 6 to 31 December 2005, before the theatre hosted the Edinburgh International Festival hit drama Blackbird starring Roger Allam. The award-winning play Enron (directed by Rupert Goold, starring Samuel West and Tim Pigott-Smith) transferred here after a sellout run at the Royal Court. The European premiere of the Broadway hit, Avenue Q, started previewing on 2 June 2006 and had its opening night on 28 June 2006, finally closing on 28 March 2009 prior to transferring to the Gielgud Theatre. Following a production of Deathtrap, directed by Matthew Warchus and starring Simon Russell Beale and Jonathan Groff, the theatre became the home of jukebox musical Million Dollar Quartet in February 2011.

=== Other productions since 2000 ===
- Endgame (10 March 2004 – 1 May 2004) by Samuel Beckett, starring Lee Evans and Michael Gambon
- Suddenly Last Summer (14 May 2004 – 31 July 2004) by Tennessee Williams, starring Diana Rigg
- Twelfth Night (26 August 2004 – 30 October 2004) by William Shakespeare, starring Raza Jaffrey and Kulvinder Ghir
- The Royal Shakespeare Company's Hamlet (23 November 2004 – 11 December 2004) by William Shakespeare, starring Toby Stephens
- Peter Pan – 100 Years of Peter Pan (19 December 2004) by JM Barrie
- The Royal Shakespeare Company's Romeo and Juliet (21 December 2004 – 8 January 2005) by William Shakespeare
- The Royal Shakespeare Company's King Lear (18 January 2005 – 5 February 2005) by William Shakespeare, starring Corin Redgrave
- The Royal Shakespeare Company's Macbeth (16 February 2005 – 5 March 2005) by William Shakespeare
- The Royal Shakespeare Company's Hecuba (7 April 2005 – 7 May 2005) by Tony Harrison, adapted from Euripides, starring Vanessa Redgrave
- The Shaughraun (8 June 2005 – 30 July 2005) by Dion Boucicault
- Ducktastic! (19 October 2005 – 19 November 2005) by Sean Foley and Hamish McColl
- Celebration – Harold Pinter (1–3 December 2005) by Harold Pinter
- A Christmas Carol (7 December 2005 – 31 December 2005) by Patrick Stewart, adapted from Charles Dickens, starring Patrick Stewart
- Blackbird (13 February 2006 – 13 May 2006) by David Harrower, starring Roger Allam and Jodhi May
- Avenue Q (28 June 2006 – 28 March 2009)
- Calendar Girls (13 April 2009 – 9 January 2010)
- Enron (26 January 2010 – 14 August 2010)
- Deathtrap (7 September 2010 – 15 January 2011) by Ira Levin, starring Simon Russell Beale and Jonathan Groff
- Million Dollar Quartet (28 February 2011 – 14 January 2012)
- Hay Fever (23 February 2012 – 2 June 2012) by Noël Coward starring Lindsay Duncan, Jeremy Northam, Kevin McNally and Olivia Colman
- Gatz (13 June 2012 – 15 July 2012)
- Julius Caesar (8 August 2012 – 15 September 2012) by William Shakespeare (RSC transfer starring Paterson Joseph, Ray Fearon, Jeffery Kissoon and Cyril Nri)
- Much Ado About Nothing (22 September 2012 – 27 October 2012) by William Shakespeare (RSC transfer starring Meera Syal)
- Uncle Vanya (5 November 2012 – 10 November 2012) (performed in Russian with English subtitles)
- The Full Monty (25 February 2014 – 29 March 2014)
- Good People (19 April 2014 – 14 June 2014) starring Imelda Staunton
- Shakespeare in Love (25 July 2014 – 18 April 2015)
- Death of a Salesman (13 May 2015 – 18 July 2015) by Arthur Miller (RSC transfer starring Antony Sher and Harriet Walter)
- Impossible (24 July 2015 – 29 August 2015)
- A Christmas Carol (9 December 2015 – 30 January 2016) by Charles Dickens, adapted by Patrick Barlow, starring Jim Broadbent
- Mrs Henderson Presents (16 February 2016 – 18 June 2016) starring Tracie Bennett
- Impossible (13 July 2016 – 27 August 2016)
- Half A Sixpence (17 November 2016 – 2 September 2017)
- Labour of Love by James Graham (3 October 2017 – 2 December 2017) starring Martin Freeman and Tamsin Greig
- Girl from the North Country (11 January 2018 – 24 March 2018)
- Quiz (10 April 2018 – 16 June 2018) by James Graham
- The Lieutenant of Inishmore by Martin McDonagh (4 July 2018 – 8 September 2018) starring Aidan Turner
- The Inheritance (13 October 2018 – 5 January 2019) by Matthew Lopez, starring John Benjamin Hickey and Vanessa Redgrave
- All About Eve (12 February 2019 – 11 May 2019) starring Gillian Anderson and Lily James
- The Night of the Iguana (16 July 2019 – 28 September 2019) by Tennessee Williams, starring Clive Owen and Anna Gunn
- Dear Evan Hansen (19 November 2019 – 22 October 2022), starring Sam Tutty
- The Comeback (8 December 2020 – 15 December 2020 and 10 July 2021 – 31 July 2021)
- Best of Enemies (14 November 2022 – 18 February 2023) starring David Harewood and Zachary Quinto
- The Great British Bake Off Musical (25 February 2023 – 13 May 2023)
- Patriots (26 May 2023 – 19 August 2023) by Peter Morgan, starring Tom Hollander
- The Ocean at the End of the Lane (11 October 2023 – 25 November 2023) by Neil Gaiman, adapted by Joel Horwood, starring Charlie Brooks
- The Motive and the Cue (9 December 2023 – 23 March 2024) by Jack Thorne, directed by Sam Mendes, starring Mark Gatiss and Johnny Flynn
- Player Kings (1 April 2024 – 22 June 2024) by Robert Icke, starring Ian McKellen
- Slave Play (29 June 2024 – 21 September 2024) by Jeremy O. Harris, starring Fisayo Akinade, Kit Harington, Aaron Heffernan and Olivia Washington
- Dr. Strangelove (8 October 2024 – 21 December 2024) by Armando Iannucci and Sean Foley, starring Steve Coogan
- A Streetcar Named Desire (3 February 2025 – 22 February 2025) by Tennessee Williams, starring Paul Mescal and Patsy Ferran
- The Last Laugh (25 February 2025 – 22 March 2025) by Paul Hendy, starring Bob Golding, Simon Cartwright and Damian Williams
- The Importance of Being Earnest (18 September 2025 – 10 January 2026) by Oscar Wilde, starring Olly Alexander, Hugh Dennis and Stephen Fry
- Dracula (4 February 2026 – 30 May 2026) by Kip Williams, starring Cynthia Erivo
- Cyrano de Bergerac (13 June 2026 – 5 September 2026) by Edmond Rostand, starring Adrian Lester
- Into the Woods (7 October 2026 – 9 January 2027) by Stephen Sondheim and James Lapine
- August: Osage County (18 January 2027 – 10 April 2027) by Tracy Letts, starring Lesley Manville and Anna Maxwell Martin

=== The Michael Grandage Company ===
- Privates on Parade by Peter Nichols (10 December 2012 – 2 March 2013) starring Simon Russell Beale
- Peter and Alice by John Logan (25 March 2013 – 1 June 2013) starring Judi Dench and Ben Whishaw
- The Cripple of Inishmaan by Martin McDonagh (18 June 2013 – 31 August 2013) starring Daniel Radcliffe
- A Midsummer Night's Dream by William Shakespeare (17 September 2013 – 16 November 2013) starring Sheridan Smith and David Walliams
- Henry V by William Shakespeare (3 December 2013 – 15 February 2014) starring Jude Law
- Photograph 51 by Anna Ziegler (14 September 2015 – 21 November 2015) starring Nicole Kidman

=== Mischief Theatre ===
- The Comedy about Spies (14 April 2025 – 5 September 2025)

== Citations ==
=== Sources ===
- Gaye, Freda, ed. (1967). Who's Who in the Theatre (fourteenth ed.). London: Sir Isaac Pitman and Sons. OCLC 5997224.
- Mander, Raymond; Joe Mitchenson (1975). The Theatres of London. New English Library. ISBN 978-1-84002-054-0.
- Mander, Raymond; Joe Mitchenson (2000) [1957]. Theatrical Companion to Coward. Barry Day and Sheridan Morley (2000 edition, ed.) (second ed.). London: Oberon Books. ISBN 978-1-84002-054-0.
