= Daniel Clarkson =

British comedy actor and playwright

- Occupations: actor, playwright
- Years active: 2000 - present

Daniel Clarkson is a British comedy actor and playwright.

== Career ==
In 2009, he presented on CBBC as part of the comedy Duo 'Dan and Jeff' with Jefferson Turner. He wrote and co-starred with Jefferson Turner in the show, Potted Potter, which was nominated for an Olivier Award in 2012 as well as writing and having critically acclaimed runs of his other shows Potted Sherlock, Potted Pirates and Potted Panto. which was also nominated for an Olivier Award for 'Best Entertainment' in 2011. Potted Potter continues to tour the world. and 2015. The New York Times referred to his performance as 'channeling a caffeinated Robin Williams'. In 2019 Clarkson wrote the critically acclaimed 'The Crown Dual' a parody of 'The Crown' with the Daily Telegraph describing it as "A glorious parody of the Netflix series reminding us what theatre is all about".

== Television ==
- Monster Court (2021–2022)
- Loaded (2017)
- CBBC (2009–2010)
