= Ducktastic =

2005 comedy show

Original window card

Ducktastic is a 2005 farce, parodying the Siegfried and Roy Las Vegas act, but with performing ducks instead of tigers. The show stars, and was written by the double act The Right Size (Hamish McColl and Sean Foley) and directed by Kenneth Branagh.

In 2006, it was nominated for the Laurence Olivier Award for Best Entertainment, losing out to Derren Brown's Something Wicked This Way Comes.
