= The Play What I Wrote =

Comic British play

- Original language: English
- Written by: Hamish McColl; Sean Foley; Eddie Braben
- Subject: Morecambe and Wise
- Genre: Comedy

Premiere
- Date: 27 September 2001
- Place: Liverpool Playhouse Theatre

The Play What I Wrote is a comedy play written by Hamish McColl, Sean Foley and Eddie Braben, starring Foley and McColl (the double act The Right Size, playing characters named "Sean" and "Hamish"), with Toby Jones, directed by Kenneth Branagh and produced in its original production by David Pugh and Dafydd Rogers. The show is a celebration of the British comedy double act Morecambe and Wise, and an irreverent and farcical exploration of the nature of double acts in general.

== Synopsis ==
Its title is drawn from one of Morecambe and Wise's catchphrases, as is "A Tight Squeeze for the Scarlet Pimple", the "play within a play" (with a cameo by a mystery guest star) which formed the play's second half. It is named after the "play wot I wrote", a series of inept plays, supposedly written by a proud Ernie Wise, and featuring a celebrity guest which formed the finale to each Morecambe and Wise show. In The Play What I Wrote, "Sean" writes a similarly inept play and is humoured by "Hamish" in the first half by having it performed. As in the Morecambe and Wise antecedent, the celebrity would play him or herself set up to appear, rather foolishly, as the title character of this play within a play. Celebrities who appeared as the mystery guest during the show's London run included Ralph Fiennes (who appeared on opening night), Ewan McGregor, Bob Geldof, Cilla Black and Sue Johnston. Kevin Kline, Roger Moore (who suffered a heart attack onstage during a performance), Alan Alda, Al Roker, Jeff Goldblum and Daniel Radcliffe were among those who appeared in the Broadway run.

== Background ==
According to Foley the idea for producing a show about Morecambe and Wise originally came from David Pugh: although Foley and McColl regarded the idea of "impersonat(ing) one of the most famous double-acts of all time" as "a poisoned chalice", the duo worked on a script with the hope that Pugh would reconsider the idea. When Pugh expressed his approval for what they had written, the pair decided that rather than engaging in a straightforward imitation of Morecambe and Wise, they should essentially play themselves in what Foley described as "a homage... but a cock-eyed one. The idea was to look at what it means to be a double-act as well as evoking Eric and Ernie’s comic spirit". Braben contributed some new jokes to the play: according to Foley, he insisted on being paid per gag. Foley and McColl initially asked Toby Jones, who knew them and was a fan of their work, to play multiple supporting roles in the show, Jones initially refused: they then consolidated the various parts into the character of Arthur, a nod to Arthur Tolcher, who regularly appeared in Morecambe and Wise's TV shows: Jones accepted the combined role.

== Production history ==
The play debuted at the Liverpool Playhouse Theatre in the summer of 2001. It then premiered in the West End at the Wyndham's Theatre in November 2001, directed by Kenneth Branagh. The play proved a prolonged success and earned positive reviews. Michael Billington, reviewing for The Guardian, wrote: "The real joy of the evening, however, is that the gags come thick and fast, producing a kind of comic delirium. Matt Wolf, reviewing for Variety, wrote "...it's the innocence of “The Play What I Wrote” (the grammatical inaccuracy of the title is part of its point) that represents the evening's best calling card,...the evening trades in old-fashioned verbal jokes...and visual ones." Irving Davies received a nomination for the 2002 Laurence Olivier Award for Best Theatre Choreographer, and Foley and McColl a joint Best Actor nomination also in the Laurence Olivier Awards. Although they did not win, the production achieved an Olivier Award for Best Comedy and for best actor in a supporting role for Jones. It subsequently toured the UK from 2002 to 2003.

The play opened on Broadway at the Lyceum Theatre on March 30, 2003, and closed on June 15, 2003, after 89 performances. It was nominated for the 2003 Tony Award for Special Theatrical Event but did not win. One of the show's producers was Mike Nichols, with the cast that featured Sean Foley, Hamish McColl, Toby Jones and Kevin Kline (guest). The script was only slightly rewritten for the benefit of American audiences who were unlikely to have been familiar with Morecambe and Wise.

The show offered tickets for the first, second, third, fourth, and fifth Broadway preview performances for $1, $2, $3, $4, and $5, respectively as a publicity stunt.

A 20th anniversary revival was directed by Sean Foley as part of his first season as artistic director at the Birmingham Repertory Theatre which opened in November 2021 before touring the UK in spring 2022. The cast features Dennis Herdman, Thom Tuck and Mitesh Soni with a mystery guest star at each performance including Kara Tointon, Denise Welch, Tom Hiddleston, Sue Holderness, Gary Lucy, Keith Allen, Annette Badland and Charles Dance. The production was filmed during the run at the Theatre Royal, Bath in January 2022 (with Tom Hiddleston as the mystery guest) and broadcast on BBC4 on December 18, 2022.
