= Deathtrap (play) =

Play by Ira Levin

- First Broadway program (1979)
- Original language: English
- Written by: Ira Levin
- Characters: Sidney Bruhl; Myra Bruhl; Clifford Anderson; Helga ten Dorp; Porter Milgrim
- Genre: Comic Thriller
- Setting: Westport, Connecticut

Premiere
- Date: February 26, 1978
- Place: Music Box Theatre; New York City

Deathtrap is a 1978 American play written by Ira Levin with multiple plot twists driving its play within a play story. It is in two acts with one set and five characters. It holds the record for the longest-running comedy-thriller on Broadway, and was nominated for four Tony Awards, including Best Play. Deathtrap was well received by many and has been frequently revived. It was adapted into a film starring Michael Caine, Christopher Reeve and Dyan Cannon in 1982.

== Synopsis ==
Act I, Scene 1

Sidney Bruhl, a previously successful playwright, has had a series of box office flops and is having trouble writing. Sidney mimics reading a play that he tells his wife, Myra, he has received from a student of his, Clifford Anderson. Sidney asserts that the student's play is a certain hit. Interspersed with reassurances that he is only kidding, he frightens Myra with suggestions that he may kill Clifford in order to steal the script. Sidney telephones Clifford to invite him over to give him suggestions on improving the play. Clifford's play is, like the actual play itself, entitled Deathtrap, and is also a one set, five character thriller.

Scene 2

Sidney arrives back at his den, having picked up Clifford at the train station. After socializing briefly, Sidney determines that there are no other carbon copies or xeroxes of the play in existence and escalates the sense that he may kill Clifford. To Myra's horror, Sidney chokes the young man to death and drags him off to bury him.

Scene 3

As Sidney returns from disposing of Clifford's body, psychic Helga ten Dorp comes to the Bruhl home to warn Sidney and Myra that she is having visions of terrible pain coming from the Bruhl home. Helga wanders around the house revealing visions that appear to be only partially correct. Sidney, relieved that Helga has not accurately envisioned the murder, reassures Myra to the point that she admits her own secret wish that Sidney was going to go through with the murder to steal the script. As Sidney and Myra are about to go to bed, Clifford, covered in mud, snatches Sidney from behind, and apparently beats Sidney to death. Myra, shocked and terrified, collapses and dies from a heart attack. Clifford confirms Myra's death and exclaims to Sidney that their plan has been successful: Clifford's murder had been staged to shock and kill Myra.

Act II, Scene 1

Two weeks have elapsed, Clifford is working on his manuscript but Sidney continues to suffer from writer's block. Porter Milgrim, Sidney's attorney, throws suspicions on Clifford by alerting Sidney that he has seen Clifford locking his manuscript in his desk drawer. Sidney surreptitiously reads Clifford's manuscript and discovers that Clifford is writing a play called Deathtrap based directly on the plot that caused Myra's heart attack. Sidney confronts Clifford, who threatens to move out and write the play regardless of whether Sidney wants him to or not. Sidney agrees to help Clifford write his play.

Scene 2

Helga comes again to warn Sidney that Clifford is going to attack him. Sidney tells Clifford that he has completed work on the second act but needs to see if what he has written will be believable. By "trying out" these bits, Sidney believes that he is laying the groundwork to make his intended murder of Clifford (to stop Clifford from actually writing the play about Myra's murder) look like self-defense. Clifford, however, is several steps ahead of Sidney. He has put blanks in Sidney's gun and now forces Sidney to handcuff himself to a chair. Sidney's attempt to kill Clifford has given Clifford the plot details he needs to complete his play. The handcuffs prove to be fake, and Sidney escapes and shoots Clifford with a crossbow. Sidney starts to telephone the police, but Clifford rises up behind him, pulls the arrow from his own body, and stabs Sidney. Both die.

Scene 3

Helga and Porter return to Sidney's den. She envisions what has actually occurred and tells Porter. Both realize simultaneously that the story would make an excellent thriller and that the title Deathtrap is ideal, but immediately argue and threaten each other over whether they will share in the rewards their "one set, five character" play will undoubtedly reap.

== Production history ==
Following a Boston tryout at the Wilbur Theatre, Deathtrap enjoyed a four-year run on Broadway, opening under the direction of Robert Moore, February 26, 1978, at the Music Box Theatre, moving to the Biltmore Theatre January 7, 1982, and closing on June 13 of that year. It received a rave review from New York Times theater critic Walter Kerr, who wrote that it contained "effrontery everywhere and fun straight through". However, the Times' other theater critic, Richard Eder, panned the play.

The opening cast featured:

- Sidney Bruhl – John Wood
- Myra Bruhl – Marian Seldes
- Clifford Anderson – Victor Garber (understudy: Ernie Townsend)
- Helga ten Dorp – Marian Winters
- Porter Milgrim – Richard Woods

Seldes appeared in every one of the play's 1,793 performances, a feat that earned her a mention in the Guinness Book of World Records as "most durable actress." Cast replacements as Sidney included Stacy Keach, John Cullum, Robert Reed, and Farley Granger.

The play also ran in London's Garrick Theatre from 1978 to 1981. In 1982, Deathtrap was adapted into a film of the same name. It featured a romantic kiss between the two male leads (played by Michael Caine and Christopher Reeve). The two characters have generally been recognized as gay, though one theater publication noted in 1983 that "The homosexuality in mainstream plays such as Deathtrap do not immediately command an audience's attention." According to Martin Andrucki, professor of theater at Bates College, "It is a gay relationship, but it's a tacit one."

A revival, directed by Matthew Warchus, opened August 21, 2010, at London's Noël Coward Theatre starring Simon Russell Beale as Sidney, Claire Skinner as Myra, Jonathan Groff as Clifford, Estelle Parsons as Helga and Terry Beaver as Porter.

In 2012, Levin's estate denied the Los Angeles Gay and Lesbian Center permission to revive its production of the play. The refusal was initially based on a short scene in which Clifford was seen nude from the rear for less than 30 seconds at the end of the first act. Later permission was granted on condition that the staging avoid any suggestion of a physical relationship between Clifford and Sidney, and the Center chose not to proceed under that restriction. The staging had presented the pair as a male couple who embraced and kissed.

== Awards ==
Deathtrap was nominated for 1978 Tony Awards for Best Play, Featured Actor, Featured Actress, and Best Director. Deathtrap also won Levin his third Edgar Award in 1980 (Best Play), following his 1954 award for Best First Novel (A Kiss Before Dying) and his 1968 award for Best Novel (Rosemary's Baby).

== Reception ==
The play is known as one of the biggest hits on Broadway, running for four years with almost 1800 performances. The preface to the published script describes it as "something so evil that it infects all who touch it. The thing has a life of its own. In Deathtrap, Levin has taken the basic components of thrillers and horror stories; murder, deceit, innocent dialogue with hidden sinister meanings, plot reversals, unexpected turns of events, etc., and twisted and rearranged the pieces again and again."

In his book Murder Most Queer, theater scholar Jordan Schildcrout examines the critical reception of the play and comments on the play's status as a "postmodern thriller" that uses the closet to create suspense and murderous violence.
