= Hamish McColl =

British comedian, writer and actor (born 1962)

Hamish McColl (born 28 January 1962) is a British comedian, writer and actor. He trained at the École Philippe Gaulier, Paris and the University of Cambridge. He has won two Olivier Awards and a Tony Award nomination. He has received additional Oliver Award nominations. With Sean Foley, he formed the double act The Right Size in 1988, creating comic theatre shows which toured all over the world. More recently he has worked as a screenwriter, scripting Mr. Bean's Holiday and Johnny English Reborn, plus contributing to the story of Paddington.

== Theatre ==
- Ducktastic!, 2005
- Hysterium, A Funny Thing Happened on the Way to the Forum, Royal National Theatre, 2004
- The Play What I Wrote, 2001
- Mr Puntila, “Mr Puntila and his Man Matti”, Edinburgh International Festival, 1998

== Filmography ==
=== Films written ===
Year	Title	Notes
2007	Mr. Bean's Holiday	—N/a
2011	Johnny English Reborn	—N/a
2014	Paddington	—N/a
2016	Dad's Army	—N/a
2020	Artemis Fowl	—N/a

=== Acting credits ===
==== Film ====
Year	Title	Role	Notes
1996	Surviving Picasso	Torso	—N/a
1998	The Parent Trap	Photographer	—N/a
2000	Going Going	Scott	Short film
2001	Gypsy Woman	Waiter	—N/a
2001	Knit Your Own Karma	Mr. Gorsky	Short film
2004	The Reckoning	Innkeeper	—N/a
2004	Churchill: The Hollywood Years	Captain Davies	—N/a
2010	Good Boy	Bully	Short film
2014	Paddington	Petting Zoo Keeper	—N/a
2018	All Is True	Judge	—N/a
2020	Artemis Fowl	Italian singer	—N/a

=== Television ===
Year	Title	Role	Notes
1993	ScreenPlay	Uncredited role	Episode: "The Vision Thing"
1994	Between the Lines	Special Branch Officer	Episode: "Foxtrot Oscar"
1995	The Old Curiosity Shop	List	Television film
1995	Prime Suspect	Younger Neighbor	Episode: "Inner Circles"
1999	Peak Practice	Danny Givens	Episode: "Eskimo Roll"
2000	The Fitz	Pte Hendrix	Three episodes

== Olivier Awards ==
- Best Entertainment
  1999 Do You Come Here Often?
- Best New Comedy
  2001 The Play What I Wrote
