= Do You Come Here Often? (play) =

Play written by Hamish McColl and Sean Foley

- Original language: English
- Written by: Sean Foley; Hamish McColl
- Genre: Comedy

Premiere
- Date: 1997
- Place: Edinburgh Fringe; London

Do You Come Here Often? is a 1997 play written by Sean Foley and Hamish McColl of the two-person theatre company, The Right Size.
