= 2017 Laurence Olivier Awards =

2017 award ceremony

- Date: 9 April 2017
- Location: Royal Albert Hall, London
- Hosted by: Jason Manford

Television/radio coverage
- Network: ITV (television); Magic 105.4 FM (radio)

The 2017 Laurence Olivier Awards were held on 9 April 2017 at the Royal Albert Hall, London. The ceremony was hosted by comedian Jason Manford. A highlights show was shown on ITV shortly after the live event ended.

== Eligibility ==
Any new production that opened between 17 February 2016 and 21 February 2017 in a theatre represented in membership of the Society of London Theatre was eligible for consideration, provided it had performed at least 30 performances.

== Event calendar ==
- 2 March: Kenneth Branagh announced as the recipient of the Society Special Award
- 6 March: Nominations announced by Denise Gough and Matt Henry on Facebook Live
- 10 March: Nominations party held; Jason Manford announced as the host of the ceremony
- 9 April: Award ceremony held

== Winners and nominees ==
The nominations were announced on 6 March 2017 in 26 categories.

| Best New Play | Best New Musical |
|---|---|
| Harry Potter and the Cursed Child script and story by Jack Thorne, story by J. K. Rowling and John Tiffany – Palace; Elegy by Nick Payne – Donmar Warehouse; The Flick by Annie Baker – National Theatre Dorfman; One Night in Miami by Kemp Powers – Donmar Warehouse | Groundhog Day – The Old Vic; Dreamgirls – Savoy; The Girls – Phoenix; School of Rock – New London |
| Best Revival | Best Musical Revival |
| Yerma – Young Vic; The Glass Menagerie – Duke of York's; This House – Garrick; Travesties – Apollo | Jesus Christ Superstar – Regent's Park Open Air; Funny Girl – Savoy; Show Boat – New London; Sunset Boulevard – London Coliseum |
| Best New Comedy | Best Entertainment and Family |
| Our Ladies of Perpetual Succour by Lee Hall – National Theatre Dorfman; The Comedy about a Bank Robbery by Henry Lewis, Jonathan Sayer and Henry Shields – Criterion; Nice Fish adapted by Mark Rylance, based on text by Louis Jenkins – Harold Pinter; The Truth by Florian Zeller, translated by Christopher Hampton – Wyndham's | The Red Shoes – Sadler's Wells; Cinderella – London Palladium; David Baddiel – My Family: Not the Sitcom – Vaudeville; Peter Pan – National Theatre Olivier |
| Best Actor | Best Actress |
| Jamie Parker as Harry Potter in Harry Potter and the Cursed Child – Palace; Ed Harris as Dodge in Buried Child – Trafalgar Studios 1; Tom Hollander as Henry Carr in Travesties – Apollo; Ian McKellen as Spooner in No Man's Land – Wyndham's | Billie Piper as Yerma in Yerma – Young Vic; Glenda Jackson as Lear in King Lear – The Old Vic; Cherry Jones as Amanda Wingfield in The Glass Menagerie – Duke of York's; Ruth Wilson as Hedda Gabler Tesman in Hedda Gabler – National Theatre Lyttelton |
| Best Actor in a Musical | Best Actress in a Musical |
| Andy Karl as Phil Connors in Groundhog Day – The Old Vic; David Fynn as Dewey Finn in School of Rock – New London; Tyrone Huntley as Judas Iscariot in Jesus Christ Superstar – Regent's Park Open Air; Charlie Stemp as Arthur Kipps in Half a Sixpence – Noël Coward | Amber Riley as Effie White in Dreamgirls – Savoy; Glenn Close as Norma Desmond in Sunset Boulevard – London Coliseum; Debbie Chazen, Sophie-Louise Dann, Michele Dotrice, Claire Machin, Claire Moore and Joanna Riding as Ruth, Celia, Jessie, Cora, Chris and Annie in The Girls – Phoenix; Sheridan Smith as Fanny Brice in Funny Girl – Savoy |
| Best Actor in a Supporting Role | Best Actress in a Supporting Role |
| Anthony Boyle as Scorpius Malfoy in Harry Potter and the Cursed Child – Palace; Freddie Fox as Tristan Tzara in Travesties – Apollo; Brian J Smith as Jim O'Connor in The Glass Menagerie – Duke of York's; Rafe Spall as Judge Brack in Hedda Gabler – National Theatre Lyttelton | Noma Dumezweni as Hermione Granger in Harry Potter and the Cursed Child – Palace; Melissa Allan, Caroline Deyga, Kirsty Findlay, Karen Fishwick, Kirsty MacLaren, Frances Mayli McCann, Joanne McGuinness and Dawn Sievewright as Orla, Chell, Understudy Chell/Fionnula/Kay, Kay, Manda, Kylah, Understudy Kylah/Manda/Orla and Fionnula in Our Ladies of Perpetual Succour – National Theatre Dorfman; Clare Foster as Cecily Carruthers in Travesties – Apollo; Kate O'Flynn as Laura Wingfield in The Glass Menagerie – Duke of York's |
| Best Actor in a Supporting Role in a Musical | Best Actress in a Supporting Role in a Musical |
| Adam J. Bernard as James "Thunder" Early in Dreamgirls – Savoy; Ian Bartholomew as Chitterlow in Half a Sixpence – Noël Coward; Ben Hunter as Danny in The Girls – Phoenix; Andrew Langtree as Ned Ryerson in Groundhog Day – The Old Vic | Rebecca Trehearn as Julie LaVerne in Show Boat – New London; Haydn Gwynne as Celia Peachum in The Threepenny Opera – National Theatre Olivier; Victoria Hamilton-Barritt as The Narrator in Murder Ballad – Arts; Emma Williams as Helen Walsingham in Half a Sixpence – Noël Coward |
| Best Director | Best Theatre Choreographer |
| John Tiffany for Harry Potter and the Cursed Child – Palace; Simon Stone for Yerma – Young Vic; John Tiffany for The Glass Menagerie – Duke of York's; Matthew Warchus for Groundhog Day – The Old Vic | Matthew Bourne for The Red Shoes – Sadler's Wells; Peter Darling and Ellen Kane for Groundhog Day – The Old Vic; Steven Hoggett for Harry Potter and the Cursed Child – Palace; Drew McOnie for Jesus Christ Superstar – Regent's Park Open Air |
| Best Set Design | Best Costume Design |
| Christine Jones for Harry Potter and the Cursed Child – Palace; Bob Crowley for Aladdin – Prince Edward; Bob Crowley for The Glass Menagerie – Duke of York's; Rob Howell for Groundhog Day – The Old Vic | Katrina Lindsay for Harry Potter and the Cursed Child – Palace; Gregg Barnes for Dreamgirls – Savoy; Hugh Durrant for Cinderella – London Palladium; Rob Howell for Groundhog Day – The Old Vic |
| Best Lighting Design | Best Sound Design |
| Neil Austin for Harry Potter and the Cursed Child – Palace; Lee Curran for Jesus Christ Superstar – Regent's Park Open Air; Natasha Katz for The Glass Menagerie – Duke of York's; Hugh Vanstone for Groundhog Day – The Old Vic | Gareth Fry for Harry Potter and the Cursed Child – Palace; Paul Arditti for Amadeus – National Theatre Olivier; Adam Cork for Travesties – Apollo; Nick Lidster for Autograph for Jesus Christ Superstar – Regent's Park Open Air |
Outstanding Achievement in Music
The three children's bands for playing instruments live every night in School of Rock – New London; Henry Krieger for composing Dreamgirls – Savoy; Imogen Heap for composing and arranging Harry Potter and the Cursed Child – Palace; The band and company for creating the gig-like rock vibe of the original concept album of Jesus Christ Superstar – Regent's Park Open Air
| Outstanding Achievement in Dance | Best New Dance Production |
| English National Ballet for expanding the variety of their repertoire with Akram Khan's Giselle and She Said – Sadler's Wells; Alvin Ailey American Dance Theater for their Dance Consortium-presented London season – Sadler's Wells; Luke Ahmet in The Creation by Rambert – Sadler's Wells | Betroffenheit by Crystal Pite and Jonathon Young – Sadler's Wells; Blak Whyte Gray by Boy Blue Entertainment – Barbican; Giselle by Akram Khan and the English National Ballet – Sadler's Wells; My Mother, My Dog and CLOWNS! by Michael Clark – Barbican |
| Outstanding Achievement in Opera | Best New Opera Production |
| Mark Wigglesworth for conducting Don Giovanni and Lulu – London Coliseum; Renée Fleming in Der Rosenkavalier – Royal Opera House; Stuart Skelton in Tristan and Isolde – London Coliseum | Akhnaten – London Coliseum; 4.48 Psychosis – Lyric Hammersmith; Così fan tutte – Royal Opera House; Lulu – London Coliseum |
Outstanding Achievement in Affiliate Theatre
Rotterdam – Trafalgar Studios 2; Cuttin' It, Young Vic / Royal Court – Young Vic, Maria; The Government Inspector – Theatre Royal Stratford East; The Invisible Hand – Tricycle; It Is Easy to Be Dead – Trafalgar Studios 2
Society Special Award
Kenneth Branagh

== Productions with multiple wins and nominations ==
=== Multiple wins ===
The following productions received multiple awards:

- 9: Harry Potter and the Cursed Child
- 2: Dreamgirls, Groundhog Day, The Red Shoes, Yerma

Harry Potter and the Cursed Child broke the record for winning the most awards by a single production, overtaking Matilda (2012) and The Curious Incident of the Dog in the Night-Time (2013) both winning seven.

=== Multiple nominations ===
The following 18 productions, including one opera and two dances, received multiple nominations:

- 11: Harry Potter and the Cursed Child
- 8: Groundhog Day
- 7: The Glass Menagerie
- 6: Jesus Christ Superstar
- 5: Dreamgirls, Travesties
- 3: The Girls, Half a Sixpence, School of Rock, Yerma
- 2: Cinderella, Funny Girl, Giselle, Hedda Gabler, Lulu, Our Ladies of Perpetual Succour, The Red Shoes, Show Boat, Sunset Boulevard

Harry Potter and the Cursed Child tied for most nominations by a single production with Hairspray at the 2008 ceremony.

== Guest performers ==
- Gary Barlow, Tim Firth and the cast of The Girls performing 'Yorkshire' (featuring an appearance from the original Calendar Girls)
- Amber Riley from Dreamgirls performing 'And I Am Telling You I'm Not Going'
- Tim Minchin and the cast of Groundhog Day performing 'Hope'
- Tyrone Huntley and the cast of Jesus Christ Superstar performing 'Heaven On Their Minds'
- David Fynn and the child cast of School of Rock performing 'Stick It To The Man'
- Sam Archer and Ashley Shaw performing a dance section from The Red Shoes
- Audra McDonald and choir of the Arts Education School performing 'Somewhere Over The Rainbow' during the In Memoriam section

== See also ==
- 71st Tony Awards
