= Jenny Gayner =

Jenny Gayner is an English actress, dancer and singer, who has played lead roles in a number of West End and touring theatre productions, including Chicago, The Rocky Horror Show, Spamalot, Singin' in the Rain, Legally Blonde and Relatively Speaking as well as performing in her own one-woman cabaret show, and starring in and producing horror film, The Addicted. She appeared with the cast of Chicago at the 2012 Summer Olympic countdown in London.

She played the lead role in the television film, The Trial, the story of Gillian Taylforth's libel case against The Sun newspaper, co-starring John Sessions.

In 2017, she appeared in musical comedy, The Girls written by Gary Barlow and Tim Firth, based on Calendar Girls. In 2018, she played Ben's mother in the Birmingham Stage Company national tour and West End run of Gangsta Granny, adapted from David Walliams' book.

In 2019, she toured the country in Annie The Musical, playing the role of Lily St Regis, which finished in November that year.

In 2021 she reprised her role of Lina Lamont in a tour of Singin' in the Rain, and announced she would be appearing with Brian Conley in Cinderella at the Southend Cliffs Pavilion in December.
