= Claire Machin =

British actress

- Born: Stoke-on-Trent
- Education: Sylvia Young Theatre School
- Occupation: Actress
- Years active: 1988–present

Claire Machin is a British actress, best known for her work in musical theatre.

== Career ==
At the age of 16, Machin trained at Sylvia Young Theatre School, taking part in an adult drama course. Through the 1990s and early 2000s she appeared in the ensemble of several major West End shows including roles in Les Misérables, Oliver! and My Fair Lady. She took part in workshops for the stage adaptation of Mary Poppins and in 2004 was part of the original cast playing the role of Miss Lark, for which she appears on the Original London Cast Recording.

In 2009, Machin played Mamie Eisenhower in the UK professional premiere of First Lady Suite by Michael John LaChiusa, with the Whatsonstage.com review describing her performance as "particularly memorable".

In 2013, she played the role of Mabel in the Chichester Festival Theatre production of The Pajama Game. The production then transferred to the West End at the Shaftesbury Theatre from May to September 2014. In 2014, she originated the role of Gladys in the West End production of Memphis, for which she was nominated for the Whatsonstage.com Awards for Best Supporting Actress in a Musical.

In 2016, Machin played the role of Alice Beane in Titanic at the Charing Cross Theatre. She received great acclaim for this role, with reviews describing her as a "standout" and "firm audience favourite".

In 2017, Machin played the role of Cora in the West End production of The Girls, a role which she had previously played when the production premiered at the Grand Theatre, Leeds and The Lowry, Salford. For this role she was nominated for a Laurence Olivier Award for Best Actress in a Musical alongside fellow cast members Joanna Riding, Claire Moore, Sophie-Louise Dann, Debbie Chazen and Michelle Dotrice.

In 2019, she played a number of roles in the UK premiere of the Michel Legrand Broadway musical Amour at the off-West End Charing Cross Theatre, followed by the role of Mrs Brill in the major West End revival of Mary Poppins which she previously understudied in the original West End production and re-united Machin with her ‘The Girls’ co-star Claire Moore. The production was halted mid-run on 16 March 2020 due to COVID-19.

== Musical stage creditsW ==
Year	Production	Role	Theatre
1988	Blood Brothers	Linda	Studio One
1995	My Fair Lady	Mrs Higgins Maid	Manchester Opera House
1995	Les Misérables	Swing / Understudy Eponine	Palace Theatre, West End
1996	Oliver!	Charlotte	London Palladium, West End
1999	Les Misérables	Ensemble / Understudy Mme. Thénardier	Palace Theatre, West End
2003	My Fair Lady	Clara Eynsford Hill / Servant	Theatre Royal, Drury Lane, West End
2004–2008	Mary Poppins	Miss Lark / Understudy Miss Andrews, Mrs Brill & Mrs Corry	Bristol Hippodrome / Prince Edward Theatre, West End
2008	High School Musical on Stage!	Ms Darbus	UK Tour
2009	First Lady Suite	Mamie Eisenhower	Union Theatre, London
2011	Salad Days	Tim's Mother / Asphynxia	Riverside Studios, London
2010–2012	Oliver!	Widow Corney	Theatre Royal, Drury Lane, West End / UK Tour
2012	Betty Blue Eyes	Mrs. Metcalf / Understudy Mother	Novello Theatre, West End
2013	The Pajama Game	Mabel	Chichester Festival Theatre / Shaftesbury Theatre, West End
2014	Memphis	Gladys	Shaftesbury Theatre, West End
2015/2016	The Girls	Cora	Grand Theatre, Leeds / The Lowry, Salford
2016	Titanic	Alice Beane	Charing Cross Theatre, West End
2016	Made in Dagenham	Barbara Castle	Queen's Theatre, Hornchurch
2017	The Girls	Cora	Phoenix Theatre, West End
2019	Amour	Whore/Claire	Charing Cross Theatre, London
2019	Mary Poppins	Mrs Brill	Prince Edward Theatre, West End
2023-2026	Les Misérables	Madame Thénardier	Sondheim Theatre, West End
2026-2027	Wicked	Madame Morrible	Apollo Victoria Theatre West End
