= Sophie-Louise Dann =

British actress

- Born: 1969 (age 56–57); Hastings, Sussex, England
- Education: Arts Educational Schools, London
- Occupation: Actress
- Spouse: Nicholas Colicos
- Relatives: John Colicos (father–in–law)

Sophie-Louise Dann (born 1969) is an English actress, best known for her work in musical theatre.

== Career ==
Dann trained at Arts Educational Schools, London. She appeared in minor roles in the films My Summer with Des (1998) and The Phantom of the Opera (2004).

In 2010, Dann played the role of Diana Divane in the new musical Lend Me a Tenor at the Theatre Royal, Plymouth. The production subsequently transferred to the West End in June 2011 in which Dann reprised her role. She received great acclaim for her performance, with Michael Billington writing "Sophie-Louise Dann seizes her moment and gives wonderfully over-the-top potted parodies of Tosca, Violetta and Carmen, while hugging the walls and clawing the furniture in the manner of an old-style soprano". She was nominated for the Laurence Olivier Award for Best Performance in a Supporting Role in a Musical.

In April 2013 She played Dot and Marie in Sunday in the Park with George by Stephen Sondheim at Théatre du Chatelet, Paris, broadcast by Mezzo TV

In 2014, she played Barbara Castle in the world premiere production of Made in Dagenham. In 2015, she originated the role of Paula in Bend It Like Beckham the Musical at the Phoenix Theatre, London, replacing Ronni Ancona during the rehearsal process.

In 2017, Dann played the role of Celia in the West End production of the musical The Girls. For this role she was nominated for a Laurence Olivier Award for Best Actress in a Musical alongside fellow cast members Joanna Riding, Claire Moore, Claire Machin, Debbie Chazen and Michelle Dotrice. On 20 December 2017, the launch of Robert J. Sherman's A Spoonful of Sherman UK/Ireland tour was announced. Sophie-Louise Dann was a featured performer in the show alongside Mark Read, Glen Facey and Jenna Innes and Ben Stock. She played Madame Thenardier in the UK tour of Les Misérables. She is currently playing Madame Morrible in the musical Wicked.

== Personal life ==
Dann was born in 1969. She is married to Nicholas Colicos, also an actor and son of John Colicos.
