= Janie Dee =

British actress

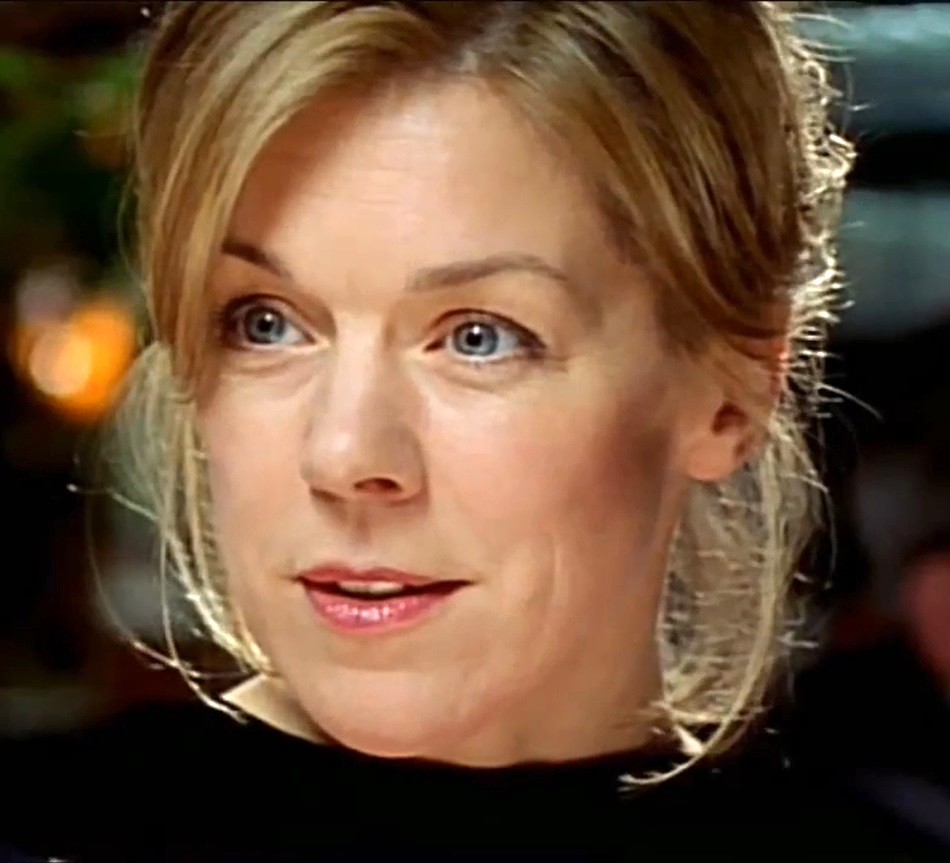
- Dee in Murder Room 2004
- Born: 20 June 1962 (age 64); Old Windsor, Berkshire, England
- Occupation: Actress
- Years active: 1986–present

Janie Dee (born 20 June 1962) is an English actress. She won the Olivier Award for Best Actress, Evening Standard Award and Critics' Circle Theatre Award for Best Actress in a Play, and in New York the Obie and Theatre World Award for Best Newcomer, for her performance as Jacie Triplethree in Alan Ayckbourn's Comic Potential.

She also won the Olivier Award for Best Supporting Performance in a Musical for her performance as Carrie Pipperidge in Nicholas Hytner's acclaimed production of Rodgers & Hammerstein's Carousel at the National Theatre.

In 2013, Dee won the TMA Theatre Award UK for Best Performance in a Musical for her performance as Dolly Levi in Hello Dolly at Curve, Leicester.

On television, Dee appeared in the ITV series London's Burning (1995) and You & Me (2023), and the Paramount+ series The Burning Girls (2023).

== Early life and education ==
Janie Dee was born in Old Windsor, Berkshire. She is the daughter of John Lewis and Ruth Lewis (née Miller) and the eldest of four sisters. She trained at the Arts Educational School in Chiswick, London. On leaving ArtsEd, Dee began her career as a dancer, subsequently moving to Rome, Italy where she taught dance, took singing lessons, and learned to speak Italian.

== Theatre career ==
=== 1986–2000 ===
Dee's first West End production was Gillian Lynne's 1986 revival of Cabaret in which she played Gertie and understudied the role of Sally Bowles. This led to an invitation from Wayne Sleep, who played the Emcee in that production, to join his UK tour as The Singer. Subsequently, the choreographer Bill Deamer invited her to the Salisbury Playhouse to perform in A Chorus of Disapproval and as Jack in Jack and the Beanstalk at Christmas 1987.

This led to leading roles in musical theatre, including Sarah Brown in Guys and Dolls, Ellie May Chipley in the award-winning Royal Shakespeare Company and Opera North production of Show Boat at the London Palladium, Bombalurina in Andrew Lloyd Webber's Cats, Duke Ellington's Sophisticated Ladies, Claudine in Cole Porter's Can-Can, and Ado Annie in the national tour of Oklahoma!.

Dee's portrayal of Carrie Pipperidge in the 1993 Royal National Theatre's production of Carousel earned her an Olivier Award for Best Performance in a Supporting Role in a Musical. The role gained her an invitation from Sir Richard Eyre to play her first major straight role of Julie in Johnny on a Spot at the National Theatre. She subsequently went on to play Helen of Troy in The Women of Troy.

Dee has had an important working relationship with the playwright and director Alan Ayckbourn. This began with Paul Todd's fringe production of Between The Lines for which Ayckbourn wrote song lyrics and was followed by Dreams From A Summerhouse at the Stephen Joseph Theatre in Scarborough. She returned to work with Ayckbourn in 1996 in Neil Simon's They're Playing Our Song after which Ayckbourn wrote Comic Potential 'with Janie in mind'. Her performance as Jacie Triplethree at Scarborough, subsequently in the West End and then at the Manhattan Theatre Club in New York, won her the aforementioned Best Actress Awards in London and New York, as well as considerable critical acclaim. In New York Magazine, John Simon wrote "Miss Dee's creation is a spectacular achievement. I am not sure that I have ever seen its equal, but I am certain I have never seen, nor ever will see, it's superior."

=== 2001–2010 ===
Dee is known for her versatility as a performer. She was invited by opera director David Pountney, to play Lidotchka in his production of Shostakovich's Paradise Moscow for Opera North. She followed this playing Masha in Brian Friel's translation of Chekhov's Three Sisters and Edyth Herbert, opposite Tim Flavin in the George Gershwin musical My One and Only, both at the Chichester Festival Theatre. My One and Only subsequently transferred to the West End and Dee was nominated for an Olivier Award for Best Actress in a Musical.

As a result, in 2003, Sir Peter Hall asked Dee to star in his season at the Theatre Royal, Bath, playing Gilda in Noël Coward's Design for Living and Emma in Harold Pinter's Betrayal, opposite Aden Gillett and Hugo Speer. Betrayal subsequently transferred to the Duchess Theatre in the West End. Hall then invited her to play Beatrice in his production of Much Ado About Nothing.

In 2005 Pinter invited Dee to play Kate in Old Times at the Gate Theatre, Dublin and to participate in a celebration of his work, including a reading of his play Celebration, with Jeremy Irons, Derek Jacobi, Sinéad Cusack, Penelope Wilton, Michael Gambon, Stephen Rea and Stephen Brennan. Producer, Michael Colgan, subsequently transferred the piece to London's Noël Coward Theatre, for 3 performances, with Charles Dance playing the Maitre D. Six months later Celebration was filmed for Channel 4, with Colin Firth playing the role of Russell, opposite Dee as Suki.

In 2006, Dee returned to musical theatre to play Mabel Normand in John Doyle's production of Jerry Herman's Mack and Mabel opposite David Soul at the Criterion Theatre. She followed this with the role of Lady Driver in Michael Frayn's Donkeys' Years at the Comedy Theatre. At the end of the run, Dee helped organise a reading for charity of William Nicholson's play Shadowlands which deals with the relationship between C. S. Lewis and the American writer Joy Gresham.

In 2007, Hall, Pinter, and Dee were reunited for the National tour of Old Times with Susannah Harker and Neil Pearson. Later that year, Dee was reunited with director Michael Barker-Caven and Charles Dance in the West End Production of Shadowlands. The production began at Wyndham's Theatre and subsequently transferred to the Novello Theatre.

In 2008 Dee returned to the Open Air Theatre, Regent's Park to play Olivia in Twelfth Night opposite her Carousel co-star, Clive Rowe. Ayckbourn then invited Dee back to Scarborough to play the title role of Susan in a revival of his play Woman in Mind for which she won critical acclaim and the production subsequently transferred to the Vaudeville Theatre in London.

In 2009 Dee returned to Theatre Royal Bath to play Orinthia in George Bernard Shaw's The Apple Cart, directed by Sir Peter Hall, and took over the role of Annie in Calendar Girls by Tim Firth in the West End.

In 2010, Dee played The Countess of Roussillion in All's Well That Ends Well at Shakespeare's Globe which was filmed for DVD release by Opus Arte. She also appeared as Anna Leonowens in Rodgers and Hammerstein's The King and I at the Curve, Leicester, and as Natalya in Jonathan Kent's production of A Month in the Country at Chichester.

=== 2011–2020 ===
In 2011 she played Belinda in the Old Vic revival of Michael Frayn's Noises Off which was nominated for an Olivier Award for Best Revival and subsequently transferred to the Novello Theatre. In 2012, Dee was offered the role of women's magazine editor, Miranda in NSFW, a new play by Lucy Kirkwood at the Royal Court Theatre for which she was nominated for an Olivier Award for Best Actress in a Supporting Role.

At Christmas 2012 Dee played Dolly Levi in Paul Kerryson's revival of Hello Dolly! at the Curve, Leicester for which she won the TMA Theatre Award UK for Best Performance in a Musical.

In 2013 she appeared in the Stephen Sondheim revue, Putting It Together for four performances in Guildford, alongside David Bedella, Daniel Crossley, Damian Humbly and Caroline Sheen which subsequently transferred for a three-week run at the St James Theatre, London in January 2014.

From March until June 2014, Dee co-starred in the London revival of Noël Coward's Blithe Spirit at the Gielgud Theatre, opposite Dame Angela Lansbury, who reprised her 2009 Tony Award-winning Broadway performance as Madame Arcati. The London cast included Charles Edwards, Jemima Rooper, Serena Evans, Simon Jones and Patsy Ferran.

From September until December 2014, Dee played Titania/Hippolyta in Dominic Dromgoole's production of A Midsummer Night's Dream on a tour of Asia & Russia by Shakespeare's Globe. The production opened at the Rose Theatre, Kingston and then toured to Aylesbury Waterside Theatre before travelling to China, Taiwan, Russia, Singapore & Hong Kong. The cast included Aden Gillett as Oberon/Theseus and Trevor Fox as Bottom.

In January 2015 Dee starred as Desiree Armfeldt in a Gala Concert performance of Sondheim's A Little Night Music at London's Palace Theatre to mark the 40th anniversary of the original London production. The concert also starred Anne Reid, David Birrell, Joanna Riding, Jamie Parker, Anna O'Byrne, Fra Fee and Laura Pitt-Pulford. It was directed by Alastair Knights and the producer and musical director was Alex Parker. Later the same year she played Helene Hanff in a revival of 84, Charing Cross Road at Salisbury Playhouse, co-starring Clive Francis as Frank Doel and directed by James Roose-Evans. In April/May she starred in a revival of Eugene O'Neill's Ah, Wilderness! at the Young Vic. Whilst appearing in the O'Neill play, Dee also performed a special one-off show, Dream Queen in the Sam Wanamaker Playhouse at Shakespeare's Globe, as part of the London Festival of Cabaret. It drew on her experiences on the Shakespeare's Globe tour of Asia and Russia with inspritations from Elizabeth I and Shakespeare. She was joined by special guests, Juliet Stevenson and Kit Hesketh-Harvey. In the summer she played Irina Arkadina in Torben Betts' version of The Seagull, directed by Matthew Dunster at Regent's Park Open Air Theatre.

In 2016 she starred in the West End transfer of Tony-nominated Broadway comedy Hand to God at the Vaudeville Theatre in London, alongside Harry Melling, Neil Pearson, Jemima Rooper and Kevin Mains. The production was nominated for an Olivier Award in 2016 as Best New Comedy.

In April 2017 Dee completed a critically acclaimed run playing the title role in Linda by Penelope Skinner at Manhattan Theatre Club, New York City for which she was nominated for an Outer Critics Circle Award for Outstanding Actress in a Play. She also starred as Phyllis Rogers Stone in Follies at the National Theatre in London, opposite Imelda Staunton, Tracie Bennett and Philip Quast. The role earned her nominations for the Olivier Award for Best Actress in a Musical, the Evening Standard Award for Best Musical Performance, and the WhatOnStage Award for Best Actress in a Musical.

In 2018 Dee starred in Monogamy, a dark comedy by Torben Betts. That year, she also appeared in Moonlight, directed by Lyndsey Turner and Night School, directed by Ed Stambollouian as part of the Jamie Lloyd Company's Pinter at the Pinter season.

The following year Janie starred in the UK premiere of Christopher Durang's Tony Award-winning play Vanya and Sonia and Masha and Spike at Theatre Royal Bath, directed by Walter Bobbie which subsequently transferred to the Charing Cross Theatre in London. She played Fosca in Stephen Sondheim's musical Passion at the Cantiere Internazionale d'Arte di Montepulciano, Italy directed by Keith Warner and returned to London to star in Off-Broadway play The Niceties by Eleanor Burgess at the Finborough Theatre opposite Moronkẹ Akinola. This was followed by a revival of Sandy Wilson's The Boy Friend at the Menier Chocolate Factory. In May 2019, she reprised her role of Carrie Pipperidge in at concert staging of Carousel at Cadogan Hall opposite Joanna Riding and Hadley Fraser.

=== 2021–present ===
In spring 2022, Dee starred opposite Griff Rhys Jones in An Hour And a Half Late at Theatre Royal Bath and on a UK tour. In May, Dee, along with a host of West End stars, paid tribute to the late Stephen Sondheim in Stephen Sondheim's Old Friends A Celebration. The production was staged by Matthew Bourne and Maria Friedman, with choreography by Stephen Mear, and produced by Cameron Mackintosh at the Sondheim Theatre. Further Sondheim tributes took place at Cadogan Hall, conceived and conducted by Alex Parker with his Luminaire Orchestra, at the Garrick Club, and the Victoria & Albert Museum, where Dee performed a cabaret as part of The Art of Making Art: Staging Sondheim.

From September to October 2024, Dee starred in Janie Dee's Beautiful World of Cabaret. The show featured a range of music from different artists and composer, performed by Dee. The performance mixed cabaret and spoken word, exploring the idea of being more environmentally friendly.

== Film and television career ==
Dee has appeared in numerous TV dramas, including Love Hurts, The Bill, as Remy in 8 episodes of London's Burning, Heartbeat, House of Cards, Midsomer Murders, A Tribute to Harold Pinter, the South Bank Show with Sir Peter Hall and In Love With Shakespeare for Sky TV.

In 2003, Dee played Emma Lavenham opposite Martin Shaw's Adam Dalgliesh in two P.D. James adaptations for the BBC; Death in Holy Orders and The Murder Room.

In 2008 she played Zac Efron's mother, Mrs Samuels in Me and Orson Welles. In 2013, Dee filmed Dare To Be Wild, written and directed by Vivienne Decourcy, in Dublin for Oasis Films and The Trouble With Dot And Harry. She starred opposite Neil Morrissey, directed by Sundance Festival Grand Prize-winner, Gary Walkow.

In January 2016, Dee appeared as Cara in comedy series Crashing written by and starring Phoebe Waller-Bridge. It was produced by Big Talk Productions for Channel 4.

In 2019, she appeared in the film Official Secrets with Keira Knightly and Matt Smith and the Channel Four adaptation of Lucy Kirkwood's Chimerica with Sophie Okonedo.

Dee played Hannah in Jamie Davis’ 2023 London-set three-part drama You & Me for ITV and ITVX, with Harry Lawtey, Jessica Barden and Sophia Brown. That year, she co-starred in The Burning Girls, produced by Buccaneer Media for Paramount+. The show was a 6-part adaptation of the novel by CJ Tudor, with Samantha Morton and Ruby Stokes.

== Radio ==
Dee has recorded a number of musicals, concerts and dramas for radio, including Carousel and Finian's Rainbow for BBC Radio 2, and she has played Ian Fleming's Miss Moneypenny in radio dramatisations of the James Bond classics On Her Majesty's Secret Service, From Russia With Love, Dr No and Thunderball, as well as a role in Michael Frayn's Skios, all directed by Martin Jarvis.

In 2013 she was invited by composer Guy Barker to be the narrator in his new orchestral work That Obscure Hurt which was premiered at the Aldeburgh Festival 2013, as part of the Benjamin Britten centenary celebrations and was broadcast live on BBC Radio 3.

She has also appeared as a guest on the quiz show Quote... Unquote for BBC Radio 4.

== Recordings ==
- Cabaret (1986 London Revival Cast, First Night Records OCRCD6010)
- Can Can (1988 London Revival Cast, Virgin CDV 2570)
- Salad Days (1994 Studio Cast, EMI Classics CDC 5 55200 2)
- The Shakespeare Revue (1998 Original London Cast, TER Records)
- Fred Astaire: His Daughter's Tribute (2001 London Cast Recording, First Night Records CASTCD81)
- Act One: Songs From The Musicals Of Alexander S. Bermange (2008 Dress Circle Records)
- Janie Dee at the BBC (2017 Auburn Jam Music)
- Follies (2018 National Theatre Cast Recording, Warner Classics 093624900955)

== Personal life ==
Janie Dee is a member of the Board of Trustees of the Royal Theatrical Fund and supports a number of charities including Stop the War Coalition, St Mungos, Medecins Sans Frontieres and Amnesty International.

In March 2003, Dee devised and produced the London Concert For Peace, a charity concert celebrating the joy of life which was performed at the Theatre Royal, Drury Lane with a cast including Dame Judi Dench, Sir Ian McKellen and David Tennant. Proceeds from the concert were donated to Amnesty International, CARE, Oxfam and the Red Cross.

In June 2014, Dee organised a Noël Coward charity cabaret, entitled I Went to a Marvellous Party at London's historic Cafe de Paris, as a celebration of and farewell to Angela Lansbury, marking the end of the run of Blithe Spirit in London. The Blithe Spirit company performed songs by Noël Coward, a charity auction was hosted by Christopher Biggins and there were special guest appearances by Imelda Staunton and Barry Humphries. Proceeds from the event were donated to Asylum Link Merseyside, Combined Theatrical Charities, Masterclass, Mousetrap, the Noël Coward Foundation and the Royal Academy of Music.

== The London Climate Change Festival ==
In 2020, Dee organised the London Climate Change Festival to inspire, inform and bring hope around climate change. It brought together people from science, the arts, business and activism to discuss what can be done with regard to the climate crisis. The London Climate Change Festival was scheduled to commence on Monday 23 March 2020. Due to COVID-19 Pandemic it took place online.

However, Dee produced a TV programme of performances and interviews at the London Coliseum, titled Song for Nature in 2021 for Sky Arts, including many of the artists and activists who were to take part in the Festival. It can still be seen ‘on demand’ on Sky Arts.

The London Climate Change Festival is now a ‘not-for-profit’ company set up by Dee and co-director Steven Levy.

In 2024, Janie took the Beautiful World Cabaret to the Edinburgh Fringe Festival where it received rave reviews, returning to London and playing to sold out audiences at the Jermyn Street Theatre, the Playground Theatre and Tabard Theatre. In September 2024 ‘'Old Friends Meet New Friends'‘ was created and produced by Dee in the Delfont Room at the Prince of Wales Theatre, to inspire young writers and performers to engage with nature and write and perform with this theme in mind.

In May 2025 Crazy Coqs will host a series of twelve Beautiful World Cabarets co-produced by Dee with world-class performers including Dame Felicity Lott, Wayne Sleep OBE, Rob Brydon (gala only), Laura Pitt-Pulford, Ian Shaw (singer), Carly Mercedes Dyer, Barlow & Smith, Josefina Ortiz Lewis, Sister Mary, Em Hoggett, and Dee herself.

== Theatre work ==
=== Plays ===
Year	Title	Role	Venue
1993	Romeo and Juliet	Lady Capulet	Open Air Theatre, Regent's Park
1994	Johnny on a Spot	Julie Glynn	Royal National Theatre
1995	Women of Troy	Helen of Troy	Royal National Theatre
1998	Comic Potential	Jacie Triplethree	Stephen Joseph Theatre / Lyric Theatre
1999	House / Garden	Joanna Mace	Stephen Joseph Theatre
2000	Comic Potential	Jacie Triplethree	Manhattan Theatre Club
2001	Three Sisters	Masha	Chichester Festival
2003	Design For Living	Gilda	Theatre Royal, Bath / Tour
2003	Betrayal	Emma	Duchess Theatre / Tour
2005	Much Ado About Nothing	Beatrice	Theatre Royal, Bath
2005	Old Times	Kate	Gate Theatre, Dublin
2005	Celebration	Suki	Gate Theatre, Dublin / Albery Theatre
2006	Donkey's Years	Lady Driver	Comedy Theatre
2007	Old Times	Kate	National Tour
2007	Shadowlands	Joy Gresham	Wyndhams Theatre / National Tour
2008	Twelfth Night	Olivia	Open Air Theatre, Regent's Park
2009	Woman in Mind	Susan	Stephen Joseph Theatre / Vaudeville Theatre
2009	The Apple Cart	Orinthia	Theatre Royal, Bath
2009	Calendar Girls	Annie	Noël Coward Theatre
2010	The Little Hut	Susan	National Tour
2010	A Month in the Country	Natalia	Chichester Festival
2011	All's Well That Ends Well	Countess of Rousillon	Shakespeare's Globe
2011	Private Lives	Amanda	Nottingham Playhouse
2011	Noises Off	Belinda	Old Vic / Novello Theatre
2012	NSFW	Miranda	The Royal Court
2014	Blithe Spirit	Ruth	Gielgud Theatre
2014	A Midsummer Night's Dream	Titania / Hippolyta	Shakespeare's Globe on Tour / Asia & Russia
2015	84 Charing Cross Road	Helene Hanff	Salisbury Playhouse
2015	Ah, Wilderness!	Essie Miller	Young Vic
2015	The Seagull	Irina Arkadina	Open Air Theatre, Regent's Park
2016	Hand To God	Margery	Vaudeville Theatre
2017	Linda	Linda	Manhattan Theatre Club
2018	Monogamy	Caroline	Aylesbury Waterside Theatre
2019	Vanya and Sonia and Masha and Spike	Masha	Theatre Royal Bath
2019	The Niceties	Janine	Finborough Theatre
2022	An Hour and A Half Late	Laura	Theatre Royal Bath / UK Tour
2022	The Grass Is Greener	Hilary	Theatre Royal Windsor
2023	The Motive and the Cue	Eileen Herlie (Gertrude)	National Theatre
2024	Laughing Boy	Sara Ryan	Jermyn Street Theatre
2025	A Role To Die For	Deborah	Barn Theatre Cirencester
2025	Fallen Angels	Julia	Menier Chocolate Factory

=== Musical theatre ===
Year	Title	Role	Venue	Notes
1986	Cabaret	Gussy, Helga, u/s Sally Bowles	Strand Theatre	
1988	Can-Can	Claudine	Strand Theatre	
1988	Cats	Bombalurina	New London Theatre	
1989	Show Boat	Ellie May Chipley	London Palladium / National Tour	
1992	Sophisticated Ladies	Company	Gielgud Theatre / National Tour	
1992	Between The Lines	Jenny	Etcetera Theatre, London	
1992	Dreams From A Summerhouse	Amanda	Stephen Joseph Theatre, Scarborough	
1993	A Connecticut Yankee	Sandy	Open Air Theatre, Regent's Park	
1993	Carousel	Carrie Pipperidge	Royal National Theatre, London	
1994	The Shakepare Revue	Company	RSC (The Pit) / Vaudeville Theatre	
1996	The Sound of Music	Maria von Trapp	Crucible, Sheffield	
1997	They're Playing Our Song	Sonia	Stephen Joseph Theatre	
1998	Enter The Guardsman	The Actress	Donmar Warehouse, London	
1998	Love Songs For Shopkeepers	Michelle	Stephen Joseph Theatre	
1999	South Pacific	Nellie Forbush	Crucible, Sheffield	
2001	Paradise Moscow	Lydochka	Opera North, Leeds	
2001	My One And Only	Edythe	Chichester Festival / Piccadilly Theatre	
2002	Divas at the Donmar	One Woman Show	Donmar Warehouse, London	
2003	Anyone Can Whistle	Fay Apple	Bridewell Theatre	
2006	Mack And Mabel	Mabel Normand	Criterion Theatre / Tour	
2010	The King And I	Anna Leonowens	Curve, Leicester	
2012	Hello Dolly!	Dolly Levi	Curve, Leicester	
2013	Putting It Together	Woman One	G-Live, Guildford / St James Theatre	
2015	A Little Night Music	Desiree Armfeldt	Palace Theatre	
2017	Follies	Phyllis Rogers Stone	National Theatre	
2019	Passion	Fosca	Cantiere Internazionale d'Arte	
2019	Carousel	Carrie Pipperidge	Cadogan Hall	
2019	The Boy Friend	Madame Dubonnet	Menier Chocolate Factory	
2020	A Little Night Music	Desiree Armfeldt	Buxton Opera House	
2022	Stephen Sondheim's Old Friends	Company	Gielgud Theatre	

=== Cabaret ===
Year	Title	Ref.
2015	Dee-licious, Lightful and Lovely	
2018	Cabaret at Curve	
2024	Janie Dee's Beautiful World Cabaret	

== Filmography ==
=== Film ===
Year	Title	Role	Notes
2007	Love Me Still	Tina	
2008	Me and Orson Welles	Mrs Samuels	
2015	The Bathroom	Valerie	Short film
2015	Dare to Be Wild	Marigold	
2016	As One	Maggie	Short film
2016	The Driving Seat	Jane	Short film
2019	Official Secrets	Jan Clements	

=== Television ===
Year	Title	Role	Notes
1993	Love Hurts	Megan Hood	Episode: "If the Cap Fits"
1993	The Bill	Sandra Stevenson	Episode: "Sticks and Stones"
1994	The Boot Street Band	Clarissa Trump	Episode: "The School Secretary"
1995	London's Burning	Remi	9 episodes
1996	Look and Read	Singer	10 episodes
1998	Little White Lies	Helen	Television film
1999	Out of the Cold (The Virtuoso)	Consul's Secretary	
2001	Heartbeat	Sylvia Smith	Episode: "Sylvia's Mother"
2002	Midsomer Murders	Caroline Harrington	Episode: "A Worm in the Bud"
2003	Death in Holy Orders	Emma Lavenham	2 episodes
2004	The Murder Room	Emma Lavenham	2 episodes
2013	The Trouble With Dot and Harry	Diane	
2016	Crashing	Cara	Episode #1.6
2019	Chimerica	Joanna Geary	Episode: " The Brace Position"
2023	You & Me	Hannah	2 episodes
2023	The Burning Girls	Clara Rushton	6 episodes

== Audio work ==
=== Radio ===
Year	Title	Role	Station	Notes
2003	Under The Net		BBC Radio 4	Dir. Maria Aitken
2004	Forever Mine	Angela	BBC Radio 4	Dir. Martin Jarvis
2008	Dr No	Miss Moneypenny	BBC Radio 4	Dir. Martin Jarvis
2009	Man of the Moment	Trudie Parks	BBC Radio 4	Dir. Martin Jarvis
2009	Words & Music: The Double	Narrator	BBC Radio 3	Prod. Peter Meanwell
2012	From Russia With Love	Miss Moneypenny	BBC Radio 4	Dir. Martin Jarvis
2013	Skios	Georgie	BBC Radio 4	Dir. Martin Jarvis
2013	On Her Majesty's Secret Service	Miss Moneypenny	BBC Radio 4	Dir. Martin Jarvis
2013	That Obscure Hurt	Narrator	BBC Radio 3	Composer Guy Barker

=== Podcast ===
Year	Title	Role	Notes
2016	Doctor Who: Doom Coalition	Risolva	Episode: "The Doomsday Chronometer"

== Awards and nominations ==
Year	Award	Category	Work	Result	Ref.
1993	Laurence Olivier Awards	Best Performance in a Supporting Role in a Musical	Carousel	Won	
1999	Evening Standard Theatre Award	Best Actress	Comic Potential	Won	
1999	Critics' Circle Theatre Award	Best Actress	Comic Potential	Won	
2000	Laurence Olivier Award	Best Actress	Comic Potential	Won	
2001	Drama Desk Award	Outstanding Actress in a Play	Comic Potential	Nominated	
2001	Lucile Lortel Award	Outstanding Actress	Comic Potential	Nominated	
2001	Obie Award	Performance	Comic Potential	Won	
2001	Theatre World Award		Comic Potential	Honouree	
2003	Laurence Olivier Award	Best Actress in a Musical	My One and Only	Nominated	
2004	Whatsonstage Award	Best Actress in A Play	Betrayal	Nominated	
2013	Laurence Olivier Award	Best Actress in a Supporting Role	NSFW	Nominated	
2013	UK Theatre Award	Best Performance in a Musical	Hello, Dolly!	Won	
2017	Outer Critics Circle Awards	Outstanding Actress in a Play	Linda	Nominated	
2017	Evening Standard Theatre Award	Best Musical Performance	Follies	Nominated	
2018	Laurence Olivier Award	Best Actress in a Musical	Follies	Nominated	
2018	WhatsOnStage Award	Best Actress in a Musical	Follies	Nominated	
