= Calendar Girls =

2003 British comedy film by Nigel Cole

- Theatrical release poster
- Directed by: Nigel Cole
- Written by: Tim Firth; Juliette Towhidi
- Produced by: Suzanne Mackie; Nick Barton
- Starring: Helen Mirren; Julie Walters; Linda Bassett; Annette Crosbie; Celia Imrie; Penelope Wilton
- Cinematography: Ashley Rowe
- Edited by: Michael Parker
- Music by: Patrick Doyle
- Production company: Harbour Pictures
- Distributed by: Buena Vista International
- Release date: 2 September 2003
- Running time: 108 minutes
- Countries: United Kingdom; United States
- Language: English
- Budget: $10 million
- Box office: $93.4 million

Calendar Girls is a 2003 comedy film directed by Nigel Cole. Produced by Harbour Pictures, it features a screenplay by Tim Firth and Juliette Towhidi, based on a true story of a group of middle-aged Yorkshire women who produced a nude calendar to raise money for Leukaemia Research (subsequently Blood Cancer UK) under the auspices of the Women's Institutes in April 1999 after the husband of one of their members dies from cancer. The film stars an ensemble cast headed by Helen Mirren and Julie Walters, with Linda Bassett, Annette Crosbie, Celia Imrie, Penelope Wilton, Geraldine James, Harriet Thorpe and Philip Glenister playing key supporting roles.

Calendar Girls premiered at the Locarno Film Festival and was later shown at Filmfest Hamburg, the Dinard Festival of British Cinema in France, the Warsaw Film Festival, the Tokyo International Film Festival and the UK Film Festival in Hong Kong. It garnered generally positive reactions by film critics, who compared it with another British comedy film The Full Monty (1997). At a budget of $10 million it also became a major commercial success, eventually grossing $93.4 million worldwide following its theatrical release in the U.S. In addition, the picture was awarded the British Comedy Award for Best Comedy Film, and received ALFS Award, Empire Award and Satellite Award nominations for Mirren and Walters, and a Golden Globe Award nomination for Mirren.

== Plot ==
Friends Annie Clarke and Chris Harper live in Knapely, Yorkshire, where they attend the local Women's Institute (WI) group. After Annie's husband, John, is diagnosed with terminal leukaemia, the two regularly visit him at the hospital. Chris complains about the uncomfortable couch in the waiting room. After noticing a nude calendar in a local mechanic's shop, she comes up with an idea to raise funds to buy a new sofa. Chris proposes producing a calendar featuring other female members of the WI discreetly posing nude while engaged in traditional WI activities, such as baking, knitting and playing the piano.

Chris's proposal initially is met with scepticism, especially from Marie, Knapely's WI chairwoman, but eventually Chris convinces nine other women to participate in the project alongside her and Annie. They enlist Lawrence, a hospital worker and amateur photographer, to help with the project. The women are initially shy but grow in their support for one another and overcome their insecurities. When Marie refuses to permit the calendar, Chris and Annie plead their case to the national congress of the WI in London. They are told the final decision rests with Marie, who grudgingly agrees to the calendar's sale.

The initial printing of 500 calendars proves to be successful, selling out and gaining media attention both nationally and internationally. The publicity surrounding the calendar eventually takes a toll on Chris's personal life involving her husband and son. Despite this, the women are invited, with an all expenses paid trip, to appear on The Tonight Show with Jay Leno in Los Angeles, United States. Initially, Annie convinces Chris not to go to spend time with her troubled teen. However, a scandalous story surrounding her and her husband in News of the World spurs her to go, anyway. Annie is disappointed in Chris. During a commercial photoshoot in America, tension boils over, and Chris and Annie angrily clash. Annie accuses Chris of ignoring her family in favour of being a celebrity while Chris believes Annie revels in her Mother Teresa-like status of catering to the ill and fan mail.

After returning to Knapely, the women find out they raised more than half a million pounds, and with the proceeds build a special leukaemia wing at their local hospital. Annie and Chris reconcile.

== Cast ==
- Helen Mirren as Chris Harper, the driving force behind the idea of stripping off for the local Women's Institute calendar.
- Julie Walters as Annie Clarke, Chris's best friend whose husband John's death from leukaemia serves as the basis for her friend's idea to purchase a sofa for hospital visitors in remembrance of him.
- Linda Bassett as Cora, a shop owner and divorced single mother. She is the official pianist of the Knapely WI.
- Annette Crosbie as Jessie, a retired teacher.
- Celia Imrie as Celia, a major's wife.
- Penelope Wilton as Ruth Reynoldson, a carpet dealer's housewife. Wilton initially rejected the offer to join the project, as she refused to be filmed semi-naked.
- Geraldine James as Marie, chairwoman of the Knapely WI group.
- Philip Glenister as Lawrence Sertain, John Clarke's nurse and photographer of the calendar, based on photographer Terry Logan.
- Ciarán Hinds as Rod Harper, Chris's husband, a florist.
- John Alderton as John Clarke, Annie's husband, who dies from leukaemia.
- George Costigan as Eddie Reynoldson, Ruth's husband. He generally shows little affection for Ruth and ultimately bashes her participation in the calendar. Ruth later leaves him when he has an affair with a woman whom he introduced himself to as a widower.
- John-Paul Macleod as Jem Harper, Chris and Rod's son.

The film's fellow calendar girls include Georgie Glen, Angela Curran, Rosalind March, Lesley Staples and Janet Howd as Kathy, May, Truday, Julia and Jenny, respectively. Calendar Girls also cast Graham Crowden as Jessie's husband, Richard; Belinda Everett as Cora's daughter, Maya; Marc Pickering as Jem Harper's friend, Gaz; and Harriet Thorpe as WI president Brenda Mooney. Gillian Wright appears as Eddie Reynoldson's lover, while John Sharian plays an American commercial director named Danny. In addition, actors and actresses Richard Braine, Ted Robbins, Alison Pargeter, Angus Barnett, John Sparkes, Elizabeth Bennett, Christa Ackroyd, Matt Malloy, Patton Oswalt and John Fortune appear in short roles. American television host Jay Leno appears as himself in the film during the ladies' visit to California; they also encounter the American heavy metal band Anthrax while relaxing by the pool.

== Production ==
=== Inspiration ===
The fundraising phenomenon of the Calendar Girls was inspired by the death of Angela Baker's husband John Richard Baker, an Assistant National Park Officer for the Yorkshire Dales National Park Authority, who died from non-Hodgkin's lymphoma, a form of blood cancer at the age of 54 in 1998. During his illness, Baker's friends began to raise money, with the aim of raising money for leukaemia research. Nothing could have prepared them for the way their original calendar took off. As at 2015, they have raised more than £3 million for Leukaemia & Lymphoma Research (now Blood Cancer UK), the UK's leading blood cancer charity.

The photos for the 2000 Alternative WI Calendar, as it was named, were taken by Terry Logan, a former professional photographer who was married to one of the models. It was released on 12 April 1999 and became a runaway success, selling out in the first week. 10,000 additional copies were printed, all of which were sold within three weeks. Nine months after its launch, the calendar had sold 88,000 copies. It was then adapted for a US version covering June 2000 – December 2001. The ladies were invited to appear with Jay Leno and Rosie O'Donnell on their respective talk shows. That year, the calendar sold 202,000 copies, with its proceeds being used to fund lymphoma and leukaemia research in new laboratories at the University of Leeds.

Since 2000, the Calendar Girls have produced calendars for 2004, 2005 and 2007, and a recipe calendar for 2008 with their favourite Yorkshire recipes on the back of each month. In 2010, they launched a calendar with a new set of full colour images and the aim of raising £2 million for Leukaemia & Lymphoma Research. In addition, they have released a range of merchandise in aid of the charity throughout the years.

=== Development ===
Six of the eleven women who were pictured in the original calendar sold the rights to their stories: Angela Baker, Tricia Stewart, Beryl Bamforth, Lynda Logan, Christine Clancy and Ros Fawcett. Screenwriter Juliette Towhidi first came across the story when she was shown an article in The Guardian, and she straight away took the idea to producer Suzanne Mackie. The two of them had been discussing ideas for a female-driven film for a while, and this struck them as the perfect project. They travelled up to Yorkshire together to meet the women, and were able to secure life story rights in the face of fierce competition, including from Hollywood. Towhidi then worked on multiple drafts of the screenplay, getting to know the women and developing the script over several years. In this time the film's working title switched from "Calendar Girls" to "Jam and Jerusalem" and back again. A first director was attached, but when he dropped out, Nigel Cole, known for his screen debut Saving Grace starring Brenda Blethyn, was brought on board, quickly followed by screenwriter Tim Firth, who took over writing duties from Towhidi and worked on rewrites of the script up until production.

Cole approached Julie Walters and Helen Mirren to play the lead roles in the film. Both actresses had been aware of the WI calendar backstory. Based on Baker, Walters was Cole's first choice to play the "more quiet and sensitive" role of Annie. Known for her comedic roles, Walters initially thought Cole had accidentally offered her the wrong part, and although pleased to have been cast against stereotype, she considered the role "a difficult path to trap" while striking a balance between Annie's grief and humorous moments. As a result, she was heavily involved in the modification of several scenes. Mirren was initially hesitant to sign on to the project because she considered it "too English" and disliked the idea of a "poor woman's Full Monty." Upon learning that Walters and other colleagues had signed on, however, she rethought her original decision and accepted the offer. Modelled after Stewart, Mirren has described Chris as a "dash in"—character who shared similarities with Stewart but was actually not based on her real persona. Anne Reid was also offered a major role in Calendar Girls, but choose to do Roger Michell's The Mother (2003) instead. With Calendar Girls being rare for a film to focus on middle-aged women, while not just portraying them as mothers or aunts, Cole experienced difficulties with casting the male roles: "several actors disliked the idea of being subsidiary to women."

=== Filming ===
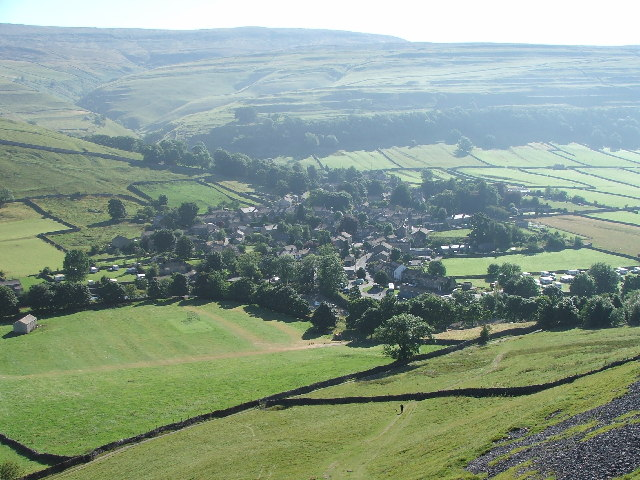
Kettlewell represented the fictional village of Knapely.

Filming took place in the summer of 2002. Whereas the actual Calendar Girls were members of the Rylstone Women's Institute, much of the film was shot in and around the village of Kettlewell in North Yorkshire, some ten miles away, which stood in for the fictional village of Knapely. Additional locations include Buckden, Burnsall, Conistone, Ilkley, Settle, Linton, Malham, and Skipton in North Yorkshire, Westminster and Ealing in London, and the beach in Santa Monica, USA. The penultimate shot of lead characters Chris and Annie walking down a street was filmed in Turville in Buckinghamshire. Interiors were filmed in the Shepperton Studios in Surrey.

The pictures in the film-version calendar were taken by professional stills photographer Jaap Buitendijk. Filming of the nude scenes took a week. According to Cole, the actors were struck by group spirit when they met their real-life counterparts from the Women's Institute and experienced the supportive atmosphere that had got them all through the embarrassment of taking their clothes off to make a calendar. That same spirit started to show on set, with the cast becoming determined to be nude, even when it was not requested for filming, including face shots. It was suggested that when Phillip Glennister's character says to Celia Imrie's character "You look beautiful, Celia", he was aiming it at Celia Imrie herself as support. While Cole and his team placed vegetables strategically for shooting, bits kept showing through and they had to reshoot several scenes. However, a young man from digital remastering had to spend four weeks removing all the private parts in post-production. The actors were very supportive of one another, with a bottle of champagne waiting whenever anyone finished their nude scene.

=== Music ===
Hollywood Records was announced as the distributor of the soundtrack album for Calendar Girls, which featured sixteen songs, including "You Upset Me Baby" performed by B.B. King, "Sloop John B" by the Beach Boys, "The Way You Do the Things You Do" by The Temptations, and "Comin' Home Baby" by Roland Kirk and Quincy Jones. It was released on 9 December 2003 in the United Kingdom.

No.	Title	Length
1.	"I Find Your Love" (Patrick Doyle featuring Beth Nielsen Chapman)	2:28
2.	"Jerusalem" (Patrick Doyle featuring Knapley Women's Club)	2:09
3.	"The Funeral" (Patrick Doyle)	1:02
4.	"Fantastic Tits" (Patrick Doyle)	2:15
5.	"March" (Patrick Doyle)	1:18
6.	"Bra's Off" (Patrick Doyle)	1:38
7.	"Sponsorship" (Patrick Doyle)	1:28
8.	"The Press" (Patrick Doyle)	1:34
9.	"Letters" (Patrick Doyle)	1:16
10.	"One More Hour" (Patrick Doyle)	2:33
11.	"Jerusalem" (Patrick Doyle)	1:20
12.	"The Way You Do the Things You Do" (The Temptations)	2:41
13.	"You Upset Me, Baby" (B.B. King)	3:01
14.	"Comin' Home Baby" (Roland Kirk & Quincy Jones)	2:48
15.	"Ride Your Pony" (The Meters)	3:18
16.	"Find Another Way" (Mornin' Norman)	3:17

== Reception ==
The review aggregator website Rotten Tomatoes reported that 73% of critics gave the film a positive rating, based on 124 reviews, with an average score of 6.5/10. Its consensus states "A charming, but clichéd comedy reminiscent of The Full Monty." On Metacritic, the film has a weighted average score of 60 out of 100, based on reviews from 30 critics, indicating "mixed or average reviews". Audiences surveyed by CinemaScore gave the film a grade "A−" on scale of A to F.

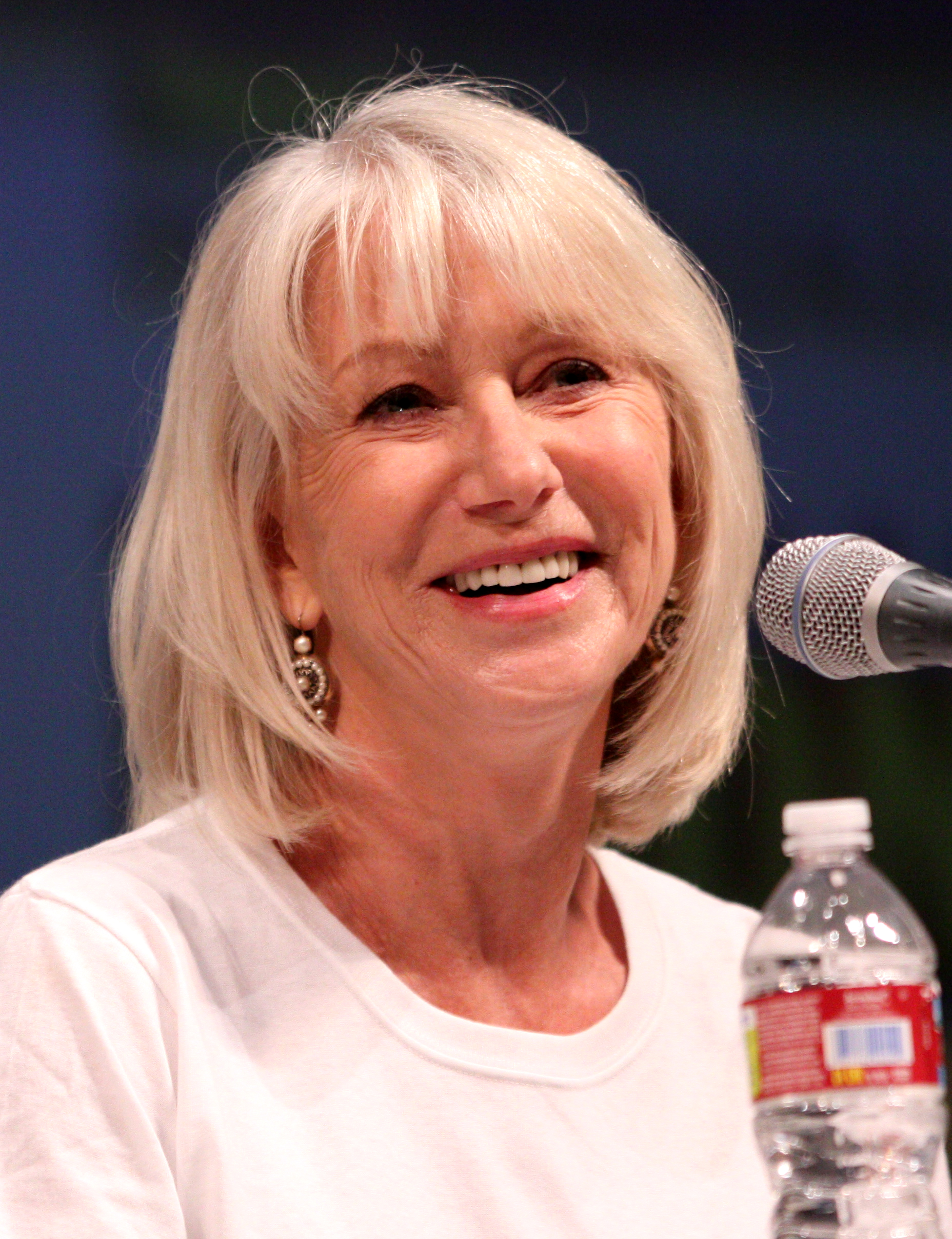
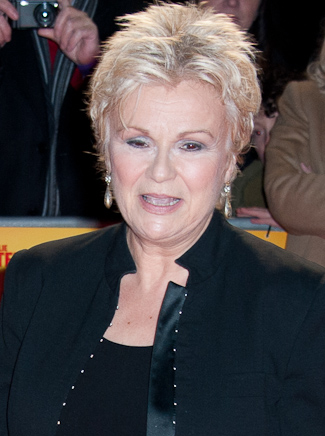
Helen Mirren and Julie Walters both received favourable reviews from critics for their performances.

Ruthe Stein, writing for The San Francisco Chronicle, said it is "A charming movie [that] should appeal to fans of The Full Monty and Waking Ned Devine – and not just because they also featured nudity that made you smile instead of smirk. The films share a wonderfully British wry humor. They're not laugh-out-loud funny, but there's quite a bit to amuse you when thinking about the scenes later." Roger Ebert of the Chicago Sun-Times said, "It's the kind of sweet, good-humored comedy that used to star Margaret Rutherford, although Helen Mirren and Julie Walters, its daring top-liners, would have curled Dame Margaret's eyebrows [...] That the movie works, and it does, is mostly because of the charm of Mirren and Walters, who show their characters having so much fun that it becomes infectious."

In his review for The New York Times, Elvis Mitchell called "minty-cool" Helen Mirren and "deft" Julie Walters "a graceful pair of troupers" and "a sunny, amusing team." He described the film as "yet another professionally acted and staged wry-crisp comedy about British modesty [...] that gets its laughs, but seems increasingly out of date [...] When the biggest compliment you can pay a picture is that it is professional and not smug, there's a little something missing, like invention." Manohla Dargis of the Los Angeles Times said the film "is closer in texture and consistency to individually wrapped American cheese than good, tangy English Cheddar. But even humble plastic-wrapped cheese has its virtues and so does this film [...] Chief among those graces are Helen Mirren and Julie Walters, two well-matched and criminally underused actresses [...] Although they have little to do but grin and bare it, Mirren and Walters are delightful company."

In Entertainment Weekly, Lisa Schwarzbaum, who graded the film B+, compared Calendar Girls with other British comedy films such as Billy Elliot and Saving Grace. She commented that "[It] is the first export from the light-comedy-steamroller division of the British film industry that avoids, for the most part, the kind of queasy class condescension such hell-bent charmers have relied on since unemployed steel-mill workers shook their groove thangs in The Full Monty." Variety critic Derek Elley wrote that the film "delivers very likable, if sometimes dramatically wobbly, results". He found that "though the film is never dull, and playing by the cast is spirited, it's actually a surprisingly gentle movie [...] The humor has a typically British, offhanded flavor, and the essentially simple story plays more as a multi-character rondo on a single idea. For every laugh-out-loud moment, or eccentric touch, there are equal moments of reflection and pause [...] Despite an uncertain start in establishing a consistent comic tone, pic builds into an engaging, light character comedy, played somewhere between the Ealing tradition and contempo regional comedy."

In The Guardian, Peter Bradshaw rated the film three out of a possible five stars and added, "This genial comedy, directed by Nigel Cole, with an excellent, tightly constructed script by Tim Firth and Juliette Towhidi, accentuates the positive. There's lots of wit and pluck and not much heartbreak," and Mark Kermode of The Observer said, "When the film succeeds, as it does magnificently in the first two-thirds, one can only marvel at the miracle of a world in which such plotlines could literally land on a producer's doorstep with the morning papers. When it fails, it is the film's acknowledgment of its own big-screen inevitability that is to blame. The result is half a great British screen comedy, twice as much as one usually expects from the genre nowadays ... Ultimately, however, this remains an immensely likeable and often impressive romp."

=== Accolades ===
Award	Category	Recipient(s)	Result
ALFS Awards	Actress of the Year	Helen Mirren	Nominated
ALFS Awards	Actress of the Year	Julie Walters	Nominated
ALFS Awards	Supporting Actor of the Year	John Alderton	Nominated
British Comedy Awards	Best Comedy Film	Nigel Cole	Won
British Independent Film Awards	Best Screenplay	Tim Firth, Juliette Towhidi	Nominated
Empire Awards	Empire Award for Best British Film	Sally Hawkins	Nominated
Empire Awards	Empire Award for Best British Actress	Helen Mirren	Nominated
Empire Awards	Empire Award for Best British Actress	Julie Walters	Nominated
European Film Awards	Best Actress	Helen Mirren	Nominated
Golden Globe Awards	Best Actress – Motion Picture Comedy or Musical	Helen Mirren	Nominated
Satellite Awards	Best Actress – Motion Picture Musical or Comedy	Helen Mirren	Nominated
Satellite Awards	Best Supporting Actress – Motion Picture	Julie Walters	Nominated
Tokyo International Film Festival	Tokyo Grand Prix	Nigel Cole	Nominated

== Stage adaptations ==
Calendar Girls is a 2008 stage play based on the film that was part of the Chichester Theatre Festival. It subsequently transferred to the West End.

The Girls is a 2015 musical based on the story of the film, written by Tim Firth and Gary Barlow. It premiered in Leeds and then transferred to the West End, opening at the Phoenix Theatre in February 2017.
