= Cruise of the Gods =

2002 British television film

- Written by: Tim Firth; Michael Marshall Smith; Peter Baynham
- Directed by: Declan Lowney
- Starring: Rob Brydon; Steve Coogan; David Walliams; James Corden
- Country of origin: United Kingdom
- Original language: English

Production
- Running time: 90 mins
- Production company: Baby Cow Productions

Original release
- Network: BBC Two
- Release: 23 December 2002

Cruise of the Gods is a 2002 British made-for-television comedy-drama film produced by Baby Cow Productions for the BBC. It starred Rob Brydon, Steve Coogan, David Walliams and James Corden. It was broadcast in 2002 and has since been released on BBC DVD.

Written by Tim Firth, with additional material by Michael Marshall Smith and Peter Baynham, it told the story of a fan cruise held in honour of The Children of Castor, a fictitious 1980s post-apocalyptic sci-fi TV series, starring Andy Van Allen (Brydon) and Nick Lee (Coogan). Twenty years after the show's cancellation, Van Allen is the reluctant special guest on the fan cruise. For Van Allen, The Children of Castor was the height of his fame, whilst Lee went on to bigger and better things, currently Sherlock Holmes in Miami.

== Remake ==
Plans for a film based on the television show, titled The Great Beyond, were announced in 2010, with David Guion and Michael Handelman attached to the project to write and direct the film. These did not eventuate.
