= Roger and the Rottentrolls =

1996 British children's television programme

- Genre: Fantasy, comedy
- Created by: Gordon Firth; Tim Firth
- Starring: Nick Barber; Holly Grainger; John Thomson
- Narrated by: Martin Clunes
- Country of origin: United Kingdom
- Original language: English
- No. of series: 4
- No. of episodes: 36

Production
- Producer: Robert Howes
- Running time: 10 minutes (approx.)
- Production companies: The Children's Company in association with Meridian Broadcasting (1996–1997); Yorkshire Television (1998–2000)

Original release
- Network: ITV (CITV)
- Release: 13 September 1996 – 25 February 2000

Roger and the Rottentrolls (later shortened to The Rottentrolls) is a British children's comedy television series made for ITV by The Children's Company, which combined puppets with live action human actors. It was first broadcast on 13 September 1996, and ended on 25 February 2000.

Written by Tim Firth, it was based on characters created by Gordon Firth (always referred to as "his dad" in the credits) directed by Julian Kemp and executive produced by Robert Howes. The first series won the 1997 BAFTA for "Best Children's Entertainment Show", beating the Ant and Dec Show. Later series were nominated for awards from both BAFTA and the Royal Television Society.

== History ==
Roger and the Rottentrolls started life as a book and audio tape, written by Tim Firth and commissioned by EMI and W H Smith and produced by Robert Howes and The Children's Company, intended as a 'spooky story' for children part of a series, of over thirty titles.

Firth's father, Gordon, who had originally invented the characters, drew the designs for all the characters from which the puppets were made. The pilot for the television series was filmed in and around old lead mines in the Yorkshire Dales, by multi award-winning documentary director/cameraman Paul Beriff, as a gesture of support for the project.

The television series was filmed at Brimham Rocks near Harrogate, Yorkshire. There were two spin off series: a half hour special for the BBC named Combat Sheep (based around Commander Harris), and a series for pre school children (ITV) called Ripley and Scuff.

== Plot ==
The series followed the adventures of Roger Beckett (aged 10¾) in Troller's Ghyll ("where the rocks are all slightly mad") as King of the Rottentrolls. He was crowned King of the Rotten Trolls after crashing his bike in the valley. As well as ruling over the Rottentrolls, Roger teaches them about things like sport and politics, and, in return, learns a few lessons himself.

Later in the series Roger's little stepsister Kate (played by Holly Grainger) follows him to the valley and later takes Roger's place in some, but not in all episodes, as Princess. This is established as Roger becoming unable to visit the valley every night due to making his choices at school.

== Actors and Narrator ==
There were three humans on screen in the series:

- Narrator – voiced by Martin Clunes who told the story and, at times, interacted with the actors and the audience. He has been known to panic in crisis situations. He has some talent for JimJamYAHA, which he used to get Roger's attention.
- Roger Beckett – the "Roger" of the title, played by Nick Barber. He became King of the Rottentrolls when he accidentally crashed in the Valley and screamed "Roger was ere!" the name of the mythical leader of the Rottentroll. He regularly attempted to teach the Rottentrolls new things. In Series 3 and 4, his presence is reduced as High School takes up more of his time, so Kate handles day-to-day business herself. Roger of the characters trying to learn, shows the least talent for JimJamJAHA as he is only able to dislodge a tin can from three yards.
- Kate Beckett (also known as Princess Kate) – Roger's little stepsister, played by Holly Grainger. She follows Roger to the Valley and becomes Princess, taking over day-to-day running of the valley from the now overworked Roger (though in some rare situations she does pass the buck on to Roger as the higher authority). She has a natural talent for JimJamJAHA.

== The Rottentrolls ==
The Rottentrolls are a group of strange, knee-high creatures who have been waiting for the return of their king for centuries. A thousand years ago, their ancestors were accidentally brought by a snow cloud summoned by Merlin, who was attempting to turn the valley into a ski resort for King Arthur. They found the name 'Roger Wasere' carved into a rock, and interpreted it as the name of their king. When young Roger entered the valley and shouted 'Roger was 'ere!', the current Rottentrolls crown him their king. The Rottentrolls include:

- Yockenthwaite – A lovable and daft Rottentroll who is always getting things wrong, often called a berk by others. His catchphrase is "Yo-o!". He is credited throughout the series as "the stupidest of the Rottentrolls". His favourite song, which he sang in the Rottentroll of the Year competition, is "Ten Thousand in the Bed". It is often Yockenthwaite who sets the plot of the episodes in motion through his blundering, yet, in some instances, he also manages to rectify the situation, either through chance or his above average proficiency at map reading (Commander Harris Loses It). Yockenthwaite is a slow reader and not very good with numbers but he is excellent at map reading.
- Aysgarth – The oldest and wisest of the Rottentrolls, he likes to think of himself as a leader. Following The Rottentroll Revolution, he becomes official leader in King Roger's absence. He is an accomplished artist, proficient at drawing landscapes and scenic portraits, but he doesn't approve of the more obscure forms of "modern" art. Despite his age and maturity, he has proved to be gullible (as when being hoodwinked by Blacksyke's story of "The Almighty Underwater Chicken") and also competitive (as when taking part in art competitions and roulette gambling).
- Penyghent – Penyghent is an artistic and creative female Rottentroll, with an impressive talent for football. Generally considered "the cleverest of the Rottentrolls". In the episode Rottentroll of the Year, Penyghent is the organizer of the titular competition and is crowned champion for her efforts.
- Kettlewell – A bad cook who often has a sudden desire to 'deck' people - hence "I'll deck yer!". She has muscles the size of potatoes, and her special dish is the garlic pasty, much to the chagrin of the other Rottentrolls.
- Askrigg – A completely sports obsessed Rottentroll. He attempts every sport imaginable – without any teammates. According to The Rottentroll Files, Askrigg is revealed to have "no brain", leaving him clueless on words such as "athletic" and "tomorrow".
- Blacksyke – Aysgarth's older twin sister, The rottenest, scariest, and most mysterious Rottentroll, complete with her spiky umbrella and her cat. Her catchphrase is a pronounced "Cackle cackle cackle." Ironically, Blacksyke is a masterful practitioner of JimJamJAHA without knowing it; as she uttered the name of the practice in disgust, the bookshelf she was standing in front of collapsed on top of her. She is also responsible for instigating the Troller's Ghylle Crime Wave and for beginning the Movement of the Almighty Underwater Chicken.
- Trucklecrag – A failed wizard, prone to creating dustbins, toasters, and mackerel. On one occasion, during the Rottentroll of the Year competition, he tried a complex spell on Pennyghent that would lift her into the air, where, while floating on her back, she would gently spin anti clockwise like a dervish. In practice, the spell simply turned her into a pizza. In spite of these failures and setbacks, he is sometimes the one approached for help.
- The Nab Twins – A pair of teenage rottentrolls who speak in slang terms which are now slightly dated, such as 'radical', 'spurious', and 'wicked'. They are also the members of a rock band called 'Cattlegrid'.
- Little Strid – Kettlewell's daughter, the youngest Rottentroll.
- Sigsworthy Crags – A failed inventor, who is completely mad; The Rottentroll Files observes that Crags has a brain only in the sense that someone who broke a jug and puts it back together with Sellotape still has a jug. He often trails when speaking and starts making dog noises, the latter of which, he claims, helps to relieve stress. Used to be an estate agent prior to the death of his wife and loss of his children, the trauma of which sent him mad. Since then, his greatest ambition is to be the furthest travelled of all Rottentrolls, to which end he attempted to build an airship and later a rocket. Four attempts were made to build a rocket; all but the third (upon which Sigsworthy forgot to embark) were met with failure. On the fourth attempt, he crashed underground and awoke to the sound of drumming on his rocket; looking for the source of the noise, he realized that he was reunited with his sons.
- Ripley and Scuff – A pair of young Rottentrolls, sons of Sigsworthy Crags. They appear in Series 4, and in their own spin off series, Ripley and Scuff. They seemed to have inherited their father's mental instability, or at least his tendency to make dog noises. They also communicate through making drumming noises.
- Loupscar - Kettlewell's son and Strid's biological brother. He was only seen via flashback in the episode "The Stake Out" where Penyghent tells Princess Kate how she grew up with him. She also tells her that he had been eaten by the Barguest.

Their names are all taken from places in Yorkshire. Tim Firth said about how he named the Rottentrolls: "I put a compass in the OS map of the area, centred on Troller's Ghyll and drew a circle of about 5 cm radius. I then harvested the strangest-sounding villages and geographical features. These then seemed to suggest, bizarrely, the colours of various mad characters. Yockenthwaite would clearly be an idiot because it had a 'k' in it. Sigsworthy Crags would clearly be off his trolley, but older. Penyghent would be female... and so on. I wish every assembly of characters was that easy."

The voices of the Rottentrolls were provided, in the first series, by John Thomson, Phil Cornwell and Rebecca Front. In later series Ronni Ancona replaced Rebecca Front.

== Other creatures ==
- The Barguest is a menacing creature that lives in the valley and terrifies the Rottentrolls.
- Commander Harris is a sheep who used to be an army mascot – he always has a tale from his old army days to tell. He too lives in the valley. Commander Harris is an expert on the ancient art of JimJamYAHA, and is regularly involved in Roger's adventures.

== Episodes ==
There were four series of Roger and the Rottentrolls and 36 episodes.

=== Series 1 ===
1. Coronation Valley
2. The Rubbish Monster
3. Rottentroll of the Year
4. The Extraordrinary Dinner Telephone
5. King Yockenthwaite
6. The Giant Floating Sprout
7. The Great Rescue

=== Series 2 ===
1. Dirty Tricks*
2. The First Rottentroll Revolution*
3. The Civil War
4. The Great Television Franchise
5. The Miner's Strike
6. The Gambling Crisis
7. The Art Gallery
8. The Football Sponsorship Scandal
9. The Complimentary Cafetiere

=== Election Special ===
- * These two episodes were originally a single 15 min election special made between production of the first & second series. When Series 2 was being filmed; The episode was split into two, and to fill the runtime; Extra scenes were shot and added a subplot, involving Roger & The Narrator falling out. Both versions have been released commercially.

=== Documentary ===
The Rottentroll Files

- Available on the Combat without Contact DVD release or the Complete Series 1-4.

=== Series 3 ===
1. The New Princess
2. The Monsters of Rock Festival
3. Commander Harris Loses It
4. The Almighty Underwater Chicken
5. Twelve Angry Trolls
6. The Incredibly Frightening Sheet
7. The Rottentroll Olympics
8. The Appalling Voice Swap
9. The Mid-Air Disaster
10. The Time Capsule
11. The Trendy Trainers
12. The Stake Out
13. Trucklecrag's Aftershave

=== Series 4 ===
1. Commander Harris in Love
2. The Four Missing Eyes
3. The Cattle Grid World Tour
4. The Extremely Tempting Caravan
5. Full Metal Jimjam
6. Sigsworthy's Final Rocket
7. Yockenthwaite, the Amazing Puppet

== VHS and DVD releases ==
The first series of Roger and the Rottentrolls was released on VHS as 'Roger and the Rottentrolls: A Complete Set of Adventures' in 1998. The second series was released in two parts: 'Combat Without Contact' (which also featured the special episode 'The Rottentroll Files') and 'State of Emergency', both of which were released on both VHS and DVD.

All four series were released on DVD in March 2020 as part of the Kaleidoscope archive project. Note: On some of the episode menus there are errors. This DVD also includes 'The Rottentroll Files' documentary, 'Election Special' ('Dirty Tricks' and 'The First Rottentroll Revolution' combined) and an interview with Tim Firth as extras.
