= Lend Me a Tenor (musical) =

Lend Me A Tenor
- Music: Brad Carroll
- Lyrics: Peter Sham
- Book: Peter Sham
- Basis: 1986 play Lend Me a Tenor by Ken Ludwig
- Productions: 2010 Plymouth; 2011 West End

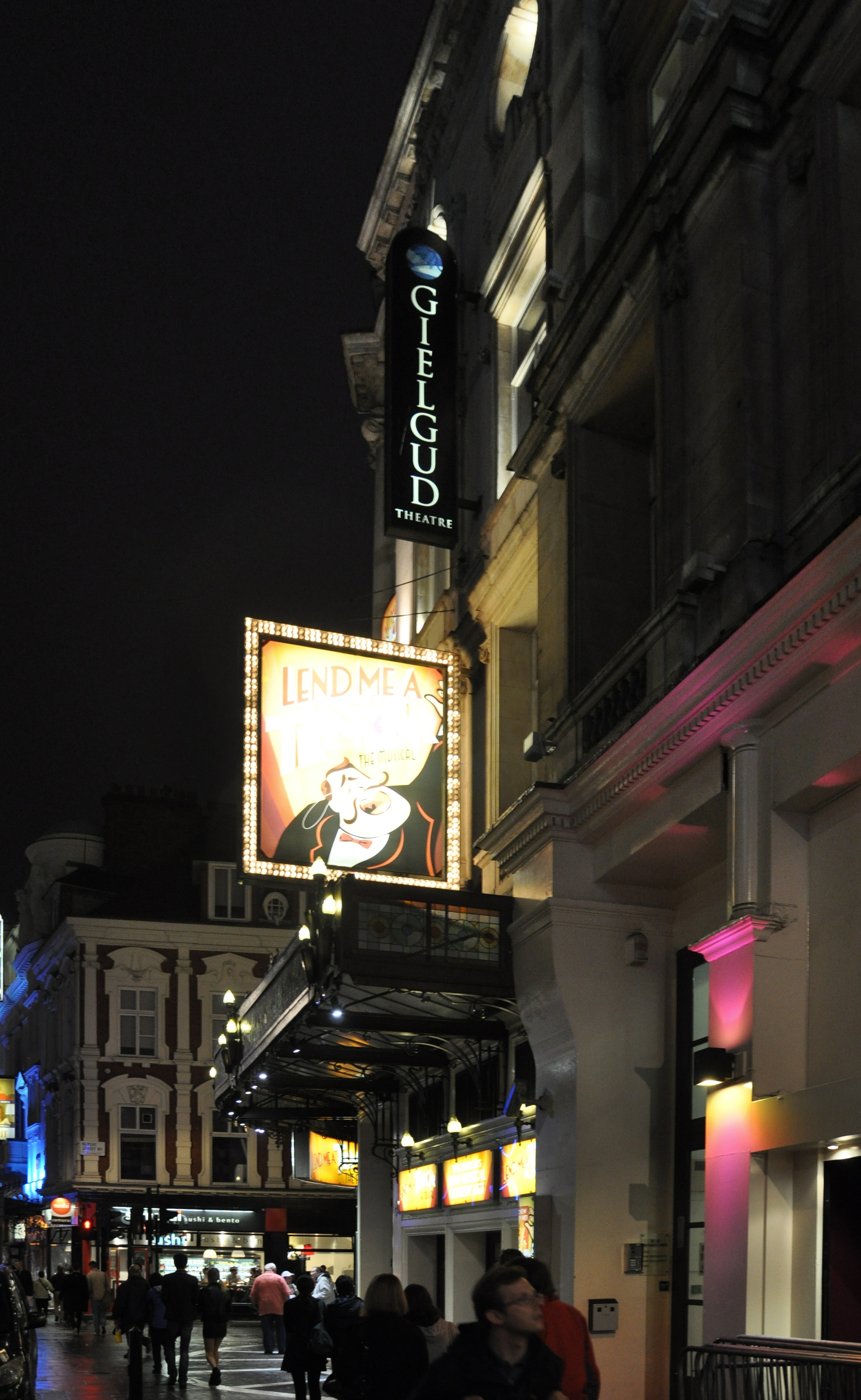
Gielgud Theatre showing the musical "Lend me a tenor", London, 2011

Lend Me A Tenor is a musical with book and Lyrics by Peter Sham and music by Brad Carroll. The musical is based on the 1986 play of the same name by Ken Ludwig. There are several notable changes from the play turning it into a full-on musical comedy. Changes include major plot revisions between Tito Merrelli (opera star) and Saunders (opera director), eliminating Frank the Bellhop (one of the lead roles in the play), adding the role of Bernie, the stage manager, expanding the role of Julia into a musical trio of Saunders' three ex-wives, upping the mistaken identity farce from two to the magic number of three and making every character more three-dimensional than the original play. Perhaps the most important change the musical made to the play is the substitution of the opera within the musical, from Otello to Pagliacci; this change removes questionable elements from Ludwig's play, raising the hilarity to three men running around as opera clowns (Canios) rather than dressed as Otellos. Mr. Ludwig has gone on to appropriate Sham & Carroll's substitution idea in a subsequent revision of his play.

== Productions ==
Lend Me A Tenor was presented in May 2006 as a staged reading as part of the Utah Shakespeare Festival's New American Playwright Project, in Cedar City, Utah, followed by rewrites and a production as part of USF's Summer 2007 repertory season, which received rave reviews.

The show had an out of town tryout at the Theatre Royal, Plymouth running from 24 September to 6 October 2010, directed by Ian Talbot and choreographed by Randy Skinner. The show began previews in London's West End at the Gielgud Theatre, the same venue where the original play premièred in 1986 on 2 June 2011 before officially opening on 15 June 2011. The show closed on 6 August 2011, with producers Martin Platt and David Elliott stating that "despite mostly wonderful notices from the press, great feedback from our audiences and nightly standing ovations, this has not translated into growing sales and we feel it is in everyone's best interests to close the production on August 6th."

== Musical numbers ==
Act I

- Overture — Orchestra
- "Verdi's Otello/I/1" — Ensemble
- "Where the Hell is Merelli?" — Saunders, Max & Ensemble
- "Fling" — Maggie & Max
- "Where the Hell is Merelli?" (Reprise) — The Opera Guild Ladies
- "How 'Bout Me?" — Max & Saunders
- "For the Love of Opera" — Ensemble
- "Facciamo L'Amor" — Tito & Maria
- "The Last Time" — Maria
- "Be You'self" — Tito & Max
- "Before You Know It" — Max
- "How 'Bout Me?" — Saunders & Max
- Act I Finale — Saunders, Max & Ensemble

Act II

- Entr'acte — Orchestra
- "Il Stupendo" — Ensemble
- "Lend Me a Tenor" — Maggie & Max
- "May I Have a Moment?" — Diana & Tito
- "Il Stupendo" (Reprise) — Maggie, Max, Diana & Saunders
- "Il Stupendo" (Reprise) — The Opera Guild Ladies, Tito & Ensemble
- "Knowing What I Know" — Max
- "The Last Time" (Reprise) — Maria
- Finale — Company

== Original London Cast ==
Character	Original West End actor
Henry Saunders	Matthew Kelly
Maria Merelli	Joanna Riding
Max Garber	Damian Humbley
Tito Merelli	Michael Matus
Diana Divane	Sophie-Louise Dann
Maggie Saunders	Cassidy Janson
Opera Guild Lady	Gay Soper

== Awards and nominations ==
=== Original London production ===
Year	Award	Category	Nominee	Result
2012	Laurence Olivier Award	Best Performance in a Supporting Role in a Musical	Sophie-Louise Dann	Nominated
