= Divas at the Donmar =

- Date of premiere: 10 August 1998
- Final show: 31 August 2002
- Location: Donmar Warehouse

Divas at the Donmar is a stage production that occurred for 5 seasons at the Donmar Warehouse, first premiering on 10 August 1998, with the last show ending on 31 August 2002. The show hosted different actors and actresses performing a variety of material from singing to acting.

== Productions ==
=== 1998 production ===
The first season of Divas at the Donmar starred Ann Hampton Callaway and Liz Callaway; Barbara Cook and Imelda Staunton and ran from 10 August until 5 September 1998.

=== 1999 production ===
The second season starred Patti LuPone, Audra McDonald and Sam Brown and ran from 9 August until 4 September 1999.

=== 2000 production ===
The third season starred Betty Buckley and Clive Rowe and ran from 21 August until 9 September 2000.

=== 2001 production ===
The fourth season starred Clive Rowe in his second appearance, Siân Phillips and Michael Ball and ran from 3–29 September 2001.

=== 2002 production ===
The last season starred Janie Dee, Ruby Turner, Philip Quast and Kristin Chenoweth and ran from 5–31 August 2002. Turner's production ran from 12–17 August, while Quast's production ran from the 19–24 August and Chenoweth ending the show on the 26–31 August.
