= Joanna Riding =

British actress and musical performer (born 1967)

- Born: Joanne Riding; 9 November 1967 (age 58); Preston, Lancashire, England, UK
- Occupation: Actress
- Years active: 1991–present
- Spouse(s): Peter O'Brien (m. 1990; div. 1994) Sebastien Maillot

Joanna Riding (born Joanne Riding; 9 November 1967) is an English actress. For her work in West End musicals, she has won two Laurence Olivier Awards, and has been nominated for three others.

== Early life ==
Riding was born in Preston, Lancashire, England, growing up on a farm, where her father ran a successful cheese-making business. She received theatre training at the Bristol Old Vic Theatre School from 1986 to 1989.

== Career ==
After leaving school, Riding worked at Chichester Festival Theatre for a season, playing Anne Page in The Merry Wives of Windsor and Dorothy in The Wizard of Oz. She met her former husband, actor Peter O'Brien, at Chichester. He proposed outside the theatre and they married on Christmas Eve 1990. Their separation was announced in December 1993. She was next cast as a replacement Sally in the West End production of Me and My Girl.

In 1993, Riding played the role of Julie Jordan in Nicholas Hytner's Royal National Theatre revival of Carousel and won the Olivier Award for Best Actress in a Musical for her performance. Also in 1993, she appeared as Sean Hughes' love interest 'Lizzie Workman' in the second series of Sean's Show. Her character was introduced via a parody of Grease's 'Summer Nights'.

In 1995 she played Anne Egerman in A Little Night Music opposite Judi Dench, followed by Sarah Brown in Richard Eyre's acclaimed revival of Guys and Dolls, both at the National Theatre. She created the role of Jane Smart in The Witches of Eastwick in 2000, at the Theatre Royal, Drury Lane and in 2002 played the role of Eliza Doolittle in Trevor Nunn's National Theatre revival of My Fair Lady, for which she won her second Olivier Award.

On 12 May 2002 she appeared in the Richard Rodgers' Tribute Gala 'Some Enchanted Evening' at the Theatre Royal, Drury Lane, which was broadcast on BBC Four and has since been released on DVD. At the concert she performed the song "An Old Man" from Two by Two.

Riding performed the role of Ruth in Blithe Spirit in 2004 on tour at the Milton Keynes Theatre and Theatre Royal, Bath, and at the Savoy Theatre in London. in 2004 she appeared in The Royal as Sheena, a woman suffering from post natal depression. In 2006 she played PC Rob Walker’s sister Ange in Heartbeat, when he married Dr Helen Trent in the episode ‘Keeping Secrets’.

From 1 December 2008 to 29 May 2010, Riding starred as Mrs. Wilkinson in the London production of Billy Elliot the Musical at the Victoria Palace Theatre. She took maternity leave from the show between 23 December 2008 and 24 August 2009 when the role was played by Kate Graham. Following this, she headlined a one-off concert on 24 October 2010 at Freedom Bar in Soho called Sondheim in Reverse, as part of the composer's 80th birthday celebrations.

In 2011, Riding starred in two musicals at the Gielgud Theatre in London's West End. From 5 March to 21 May she played Madame Emery in the Kneehigh Theatre Company's musical adaptation of The Umbrellas of Cherbourg. The production had its try-out at Leicester's Curve Theatre from 11 to 26 February. A month later, from 6 June to 6 August she played jealous Italian mistress Maria Merelli in the London production of Lend Me A Tenor.

In 2013 she appeared in the Sky1 TV comedy series Stella as Melissa. Riding also portrayed Valerie Hobson in Andrew Lloyd Webber's musical Stephen Ward, and was one of few elements of the production to be praised by every major critic.

In 2014, Riding appeared as Cinderella's Mother in Rob Marshall's film version of Stephen Sondheim's Into the Woods.

In September 2016 it was announced that Riding would take the leading role of Annie in The Girls musical written by Gary Barlow and Tim Firth to open at The Phoenix Theatre, London on 27 January 2017.

When the 2017 London revival of Sondheim's Follies returned to the Olivier Theatre on February 14, 2018, playing until May 11, Riding replaced Imelda Staunton as Sally. In May 2019, she reprised her role of Julie Jordan in at concert staging of Carousel at Cadogan Hall opposite Hadley Fraser and Janie Dee.

During the summer of 2021, Riding returned to Regent’s Park Open Air Theatre to play the role of Nettie Fowler in Timothy Sheader’s production of Rodger’s and Rodgers and Hammerstein’s Carousel. Riding’s performance was singled out by several critics with Marianka Swain for London Theatre noting that Riding’s performance was “the most grounded and emotional performance I’ve seen in the role.”

In July 2022, Riding played Rose in the Buxton Festival production of the Jule Styne and Stephen Sondheim musical Gypsy.

Between September 2023 and January 2024 Riding appeared in Cameron Mackintosh’s tribute to Stephen Sondheim Sondheim’s Old Friends at the Gielgud Theatre . The cast also featured Bernadette Peters, Lea Solonga and Bonnie Langford. Amongst other numbers, Riding’s rendition of Getting Married Today (song) received glowing reviews. In March 2025 Riding joined other members of the London Company of Sondheim’s Old Friends in a limited Broadway run of the show at the Samuel J. Friedman Theatre, marking her Broadway debut.

In August 2025 Joanna Riding returned to the West End to take the role of Madame Giry in the 40th Anniversary cast of Andrew Lloyd Webber’s The Phantom of the Opera at His Majesty's Theatre, London.

== Awards and nominations ==
=== Theatre ===
Year	Award	Category	Work	Result
1993	Laurence Olivier Award	Best Actress in a Musical	Carousel	Won
1997	Laurence Olivier Award	Best Actress in a Musical	Guys and Dolls	Nominated
2001	Laurence Olivier Award	Best Actress in a Musical	The Witches of Eastwick	Nominated
2003	Laurence Olivier Award	Best Actress in a Musical	My Fair Lady	Won
2017	Laurence Olivier Award	Best Actress in a Musical	The Girls	Nominated
