= The Flint Street Nativity =

- DVD cover
- Genre: Comedy
- Written by: Tim Firth
- Directed by: Marcus Mortimer
- Starring: Frank Skinner; Dervla Kirwan; Neil Morrissey; Jane Horrocks; John Thomson; Stephen Tompkinson; Ralf Little
- Theme music composer: Debbie Wiseman
- Country of origin: United Kingdom
- Original language: English

Production
- Producers: Dewi Griffiths; Peter Elias Jones; Paul Spencer
- Editor: Mike Hopkins
- Running time: 75 minutes
- Production companies: Antena Productions; Yorkshire Television

Original release
- Network: ITV
- Release: 22 December 1999

The Flint Street Nativity is a 1999 British television comedy film directed by Marcus Mortimer, written by Tim Firth, and starring Frank Skinner, Neil Morrissey, Jane Horrocks, John Thomson, Stephen Tompkinson, Mark Addy, Ralf Little, Julia Sawalha, Mina Anwar and Dervla Kirwan. The film is about primary school children putting on a nativity play. It was broadcast by ITV on 22 December 1999.

== Plot ==
The film is set in the fictitious inner city Flint Street Primary School, on the Welsh-Cheshire borders. It focuses on the seven- and eight-year-old pupils in that evening's sole performance of the school nativity play, from the pre-performance classroom preparations to the final stage performance, which culminates in calamity.

There are inevitable mishaps, misunderstandings, young egos, fears of failure and fallings out. The children's characters eventually evolve into mirror images of their parents when the actors all appear as their parents (the play's audience) at the post-show gathering.

== Cast ==
- Dervla Kirwan as Jaye Dackers / Angel Gabriel
- Josie Lawrence as Debbie Bennett / Mary
- Jane Horrocks as Zoe / Shepherd 2
- Hywel Simons as Errol Chiverton / Shepherd 1
- John Thomson as Christian Jerrums / Innkeeper
- Frank Skinner as Ian Rotherham / Herod
- Mina Anwar as Shamima / Angel
- Stephen Tompkinson as Tim Moyle / Narrator
- Julia Sawalha as Dawn / Wise Man 1 (Melchior)
- Neil Morrissey as Adrian Atherton / Wise Man 3 (Casper)
- Tony Marshall as Wise Man 2 (Balthazar)
- Mark Addy as Andrew / Ass
- Jason Hughes as Warren Pipe / Joseph
- Ralf Little as Clive Cattle / Star of Bethlehem
- Lynn Hunter as Mrs R. Humphries

== Production and release ==
The story is based on real events, collected over ten years from members of Tim Firth's family and friends who were teachers. Flint Street Primary School is modelled on Stockton Heath Primary School, where Firth attended and his mother taught.

The film was shot in Lansdowne Primary School in Canton, Cardiff. An oversize set was used to make the actors' characters more believable. The actresses wore swimsuits three sizes too small to flatten their adult body parts.

The film was broadcast by ITV on 22 December 1999. It was originally released on DVD on 31 October 2005 and re-released on 3 November 2008.

== Reception ==
In 2002, the film was voted in the top 15 Christmas TV moments on Channel 4.

Alfred Hickling of The Guardian thought the film "exposes what an ungodly snake pit of paediatric power-politics the staging of your average Nativity play can be... There are moments when you may wet yourself laughing."

== Theatre adaptation ==
Firth rewrote the play and added music for the stage production at the Liverpool Playhouse in 2006. It was repeated again in 2007.

== Award(s) ==
Year	Award	Category	Recipient(s)	Result
2000	BAFTA Cymru	Best Design (Y Cynllunio Gorau)	Hayden Pearce	Won

== See also ==
- List of Christmas films
- List of made-for-television and direct-to-video Christmas films
