= Neville's Island (play) =

1994 play by Tim Firth

Neville's Island is a comedy play for stage and screen by Tim Firth, first staged at Scarborough in 1992.

The action takes place in November on a small island in Derwentwater, with four British businessmen on a team-building weekend.

== Outline ==
Four managers from a mineral water company based in Salford go on a team-building exercise in the English Lake District and become stranded on a wooded island. All are quite different. Neville is the incompetent team leader, Angus a fussy perfectionist, Roy an unstable birdwatching Christian, while Gordon, a loner from a working-class background, has a talent for mocking the others. A mist rolls in, the only food they have is one cold sausage, and the men become desperate. They argue over the division of the sausage, then panic when they hear a rustle in the woods and begin to think of murder.

== Productions ==
First staged at Scarborough in June 1992, the play was subsequently produced at the Apollo Theatre in the West End in October 1994, with Jeremy Sams as director and the following cast:

- Michael Siberry as Roy
- Tony Slattery as Gordon
- Jonathan Coy as Neville
- Paul Raffield as Angus

The play was revived at Chichester in 2013, then staged at the Duke of York's Theatre in the West End in October 2014.

== Film ==
A television film was screened on 4 June 1998 on ITV, directed by Terry Johnson, with the following cast:

- Martin Clunes as Roy
- Timothy Spall as Gordon
- Jeff Rawle as Neville
- David Bamber as Angus

== Reception ==
The play was nominated for an Olivier Award for Best Comedy in 1995. Michael Billington, writing in The Guardian in 2014, claimed that it showed the influence of Alan Ayckbourn, reminding him of Way Upstream. He also suggested that it had "some of the facile pessimism of Lord of the Flies", but for him the men's "descent into savagery stretches credulity".
