= Calendar Girls (play) =

2008 play by Tim Firth

Calendar Girls is a stage play based on the 2003 film of the same name.

== Production history ==
The play was adapted by Tim Firth and directed by Hamish McColl.

After a successful try-out at the Chichester Festival Theatre in September 2008 and a lengthy national tour, a stage adaptation of the film started previewing on 4 April 2009 at the Noël Coward Theatre in the West End, opening on 20 April. The original cast included Lynda Bellingham, Patricia Hodge, Siân Phillips, Gaynor Faye, Brigit Forsyth, Julia Hills and Elaine C. Smith.

While the play was a financial success (it took in over £1.7 million in advance ticket sales), the critical reception was mixed.

The play closed at the Noël Coward Theatre in London on 9 January 2010 before embarking on a second national tour which began on 27 January 2010. The show had several different casts to keep it fresh and to also allow producers to bring well known actresses into the play who did not want to commit to long runs. The second national tour finished in December 2012.

Toronto's Mirvish Productions announced in February 2010 that a Canadian production of the play would open in Toronto in April 2011, with the North American premiere actually taking place at the Manitoba Theatre Centre in Winnipeg in March 2011. In Australia, the play was toured throughout Queensland, New South Wales, Victoria, South Australia, and Western Australia in 45 venues during 2014.

In September 2016, Tim Firth and Gary Barlow announced The Girls, a new musical based on both the play and the film, was to open at the Phoenix Theatre in January 2017.

== Cast and characters ==
Character	Original Touring and West End
Chris	Lynda Bellingham
Annie	Patricia Hodge
Jessie	Sian Phillips
Celia	Gaynor Faye
Marie	Brigit Forsyth
Ruth	Julia Hills
Cora	Elaine C. Smith
Lady Cravenshire/Brenda Hulse	Joan Blackham
Elaine	Abby Francis
Lawrence/Liam	Carl Prekopp
Rod	Gerard McDermott
John	Gary Lilburn

=== Notable Replacements ===
- Chris: Anita Dobson, Arabella Weir, Gemma Craven, Elaine C. Smith, Lesley Joseph
- Annie: Jill Baker, Janie Dee, Jan Harvey, Sue Holderness, Julia Hills, Trudie Goodwin
- Jessie: June Brown, Rosalind Knight, Judith Barker, Anne Charleston, Jean Boht, Gwen Taylor, Helen Fraser
- Celia: Jerry Hall, Kelly Brook, Gemma Atkinson, Charlie Dimmock, Jennifer Ellison, Brenda Gilhooly, Rula Lenska, Sue Holderness
- Marie: Richenda Carey, Helen Lederer, Elizabeth Bennett, Ruth Madoc
- Ruth: Sara Crowe, Debbie Chazen, Hannah Waterman, Lisa Riley, Kacey Ainsworth
- Cora: Jill Halfpenny, Julie Goodyear, Hannah Waterman, Letitia Dean, Denise Black, Michelle Collins, Bernie Nolan, Deena Payne, Jennifer Ellison
- Lady Cravenshire/Brenda Hulse: Delia Lindsay, Margaret John, Diana Moran
- Elaine: Gemma Atkinson, Jan Leeming, Mikyla Dodd, Danielle Lineker, Camilla Dallerup
- Lawrence/Liam: Jack Ryder, Carl Prekopp, Dean Gaffney, Bruno Langley, Kevin Sacre
- John: Will Knightley, Colin Tarrant, Joe McGann

== Amateur Productions ==
The amateur rights were released from 1 September 2012 for 18 months only. By August 2012, 520 applications had been received and 322 licences granted.

=== Bermuda ===
On April 11, 2013, The Bermuda Musical and Dramatic Society opened their amateur production of "Calendar Girls" at the Earl Cameron Theater in Hamilton, Bermuda. In addition to the stage play, the group also produced a calendar featuring the cast, producer and director in similar poses. Thanks to the sponsorship of local businesses, all the calendar proceeds were donated to Bermuda charities.

=== Geneva, Switzerland ===
The Geneva English Drama Society (GEDS) produced "Calendar Girls" from 18 to 22 June 2013 at the Théâtre Pitoëff in Geneva. A special charity performance attended by Angela Baker (Miss February in the original calendar) and sales of a calendar enabled a donation of CHF 6,000 to each of the Fondation Dr Henri Dubois-Ferrière Dinu Lipatti and the Fondation Artères, local charities targeting leukaemia and lymphoma.
