= Greatest Days =

Jukebox musical

- The Official Take That Musical
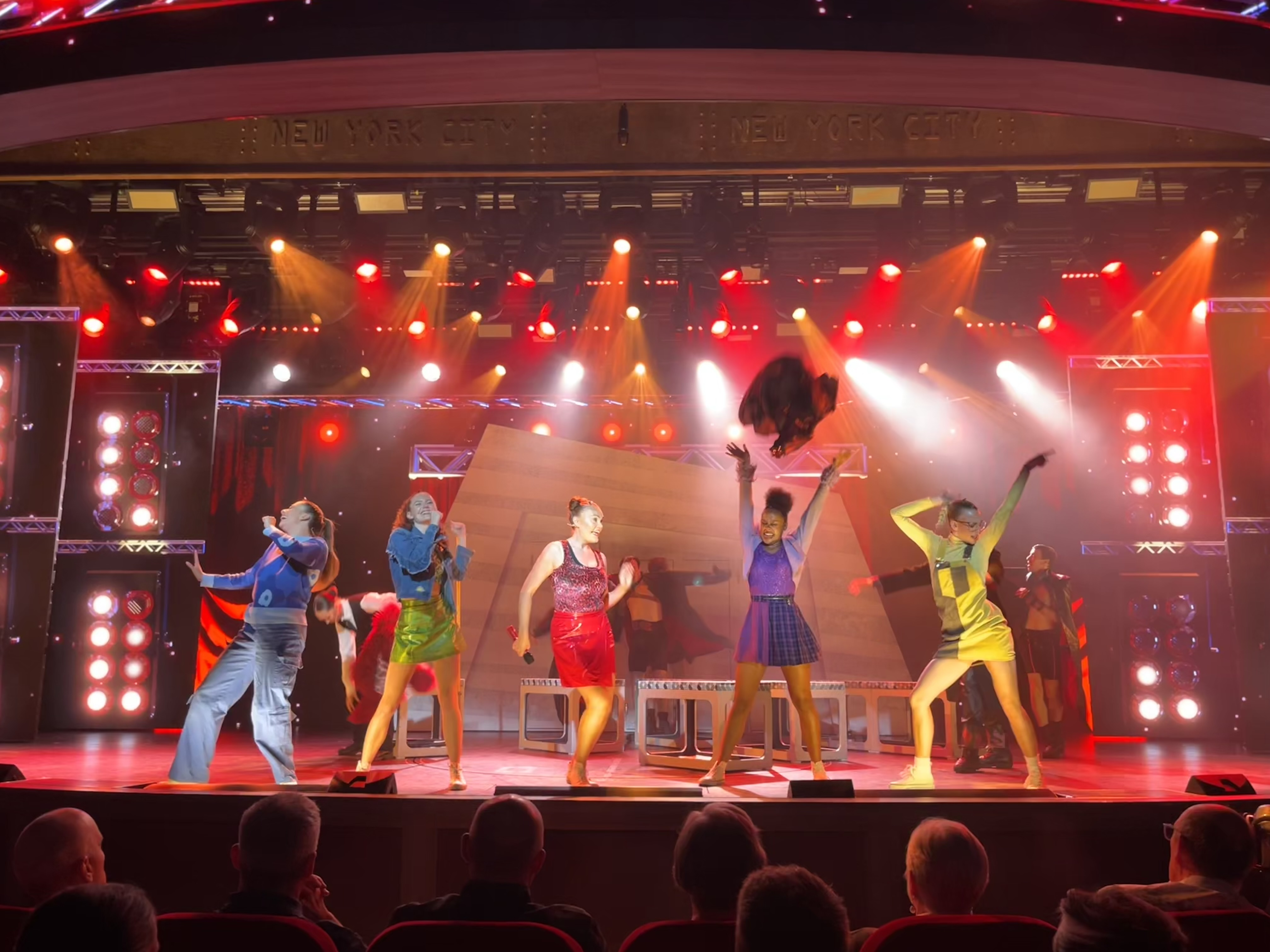
- Greatest Days Musical
- Music: Take That
- Lyrics: Take That
- Book: Tim Firth
- Basis: The music of Take That
- Premiere: 26 September 2017: Manchester Opera House
- Productions: 2017 UK tour 2018 West End; 2019 Germany; 2023 UK tour 2023 Switzerland; 2026Austria

Greatest Days is a jukebox musical with music and lyrics by Take That and a book by Tim Firth. It received its world premiere under its original title The Band at the Manchester Opera House, in September 2017, before embarking on a UK and Ireland tour and opened at the Theatre Royal Haymarket at London's West End in December 2018. The band was cast through the 2017 BBC reality television show Let It Shine.

The musical tells the story of five women who were best friends as teenagers and all big fans of The Band. 25 years later after losing contact the four of them reunite to fulfill their dream of seeing the band perform.

Greatest Days is the second jukebox musical based on the songs of Take That, after the 2008 musical Never Forget.

== Productions ==
=== UK and Ireland tour and West End (2017 - 2019) ===
The musical premiered as The Band at the Manchester Opera House on 26 September 2017 (previewing from 8 September) before touring the rest of the UK and Ireland until March 2019.

The musical made its West End premiere at the Theatre Royal Haymarket for a limited run from 1 December 2018 to 12 January 2019, including a charity gala opening night on 4 December 2018.

=== Germany (2019) ===
The musical made its German premiere at the Theater des Westens in Berlin for a limited run from 11 April 2019 to September 2019, followed by a run in Munich from 11 October 2019 to 3 November 2019.

=== P&O Cruises Arvia (2023 - 2026) ===
In August 2022 it was announced that a special adaptation of Greatest Days would be performed exclusively onboard new P&O Cruises Ship Arvia. The show had its premiere on Monday 9th of January 2023. It was directed by James Robert Moore, with choreography by Ian West, musical direction by Roxanna Shirley, arrangements by Steve Parry, set design by Steve Howell, costume by Carry On Costumes, sound design by Leigh Davies, video and lighting design by Ben Bull and associate direction by Grace Currie.

=== P&O Cruises Iona (2023 - 2026) ===
On Thursday the 8th of June 2023, Greatest Days premiered on Arvia’s sister ship Iona. The show has the same creative team as Arvia.

=== UK and Ireland tour (2023 - 2024) ===
In September 2022, it was announced that the musical would tour the UK and Ireland in 2023, renamed as Greatest Days. The tour premiered at the Churchill Theatre, Bromley from 5 May 2023 and will tour until 2024, coinciding with the release of the movie adaptation and the 30th anniversary of Take That's first ever no. 1 UK single Pray.

=== Switzerland (2023 - 2024) ===
In December 2023, Greatest Days premiered at Le Theatre, Emmen, Switzerland. The production runs from 14 December 2023 until 21 January 2024.

== Original casts and characters ==
Character	UK and Ireland Tour 2017–19	Germany 2019	2nd UK and Ireland Tour 2023–24	Switzerland 2023
The Band	AJ Bentley	Alex Charles	Kalifa Burton	Agustin Espinosa
The Band	Nick Carsberg	Sario Solomon	Jamie Corner	Nathan Tofts
The Band	Curtis T Johns	Prince Damien	Archie Durrant	Craig Webb
The Band	Yazdan Qafouri	Helge Mark Lodder	Regan Gascoigne	Curtis Holder
The Band	Sario Solomon	Taddeo Pellegrini	Alexanda O'Reilly	Daniel Jacks
Rachel	Rachel Lumberg	Silke Geertz	Kym Marsh	Isabelle Flachsmann
Heather	Emily Joyce	Laura Leyh	Rachel Marwood	Rahel Fischer
Claire	Alison Fitzjohn	Yvonne Köstler	Jamie-Rose Monk	Justyna Karpinski
Zoe	Jayne McKenna	Heike Kloss	Holly Ashton	Irene Straub
Young Rachel	Faye Christall	Maria Arnold	Emilie Cunliffe	Debora Luscher
Young Heather	Katy Clayton	Jara Buczynski	Kitty Harris	Nina Duss
Young Claire	Sarah Kate Howarth	Kristin Heil	Mari McGinlay	Sina Keller
Young Zoe	Lauren Jacobs	Laura Saleh	Hannah Brown	Ladina Rupp
Debbie	Rachelle Diedericks	Ruth Lauer	Mary Moore	Nadine Rudin
Jeff	Martin Miller	Tilman Madaus	Christopher D. Hunt	Stephan Burgi
Dave	Andy Williams	Daniel Rossmeisl	Alan Stocks	Stephan Burgi

== Film adaptation ==
A film adaptation titled Greatest Days featuring Jayde Adams, Aisling Bea, Alice Lowe and Amaka Okafor was written by Firth and directed by Coky Giedroyc with choreography by Drew McOnie. It was released in summer 2023.
