= Comic Potential =

Play by Alan Ayckbourn

- Original language: English
- Written by: Alan Ayckbourn
- Characters: Marmion; Prim Spring; Chandler Tate; Trudi Floote; Carla Pepperbloom; Adam Trainsmith; Jacie Triplethree; Lester Trainsmith
- Subject: Television, science fiction

Premiere
- Date: 4 June 1998
- Place: Stephen Joseph Theatre, Scarborough
- Official website

Comic Potential by Alan Ayckbourn is a romantic sci-fi comedy play. It is set in a TV studio in the foreseeable future, when low-cost androids (known as "actoids") have largely replaced actors.

== Background ==
The play was Ayckbourn's second exploration into science fiction, the first being Henceforward... This play originated from the idea that the ability to laugh and the ability to fall in love are both characteristics that differentiate humans from androids, as both are illogical from an objective viewpoint, thus raising the question as to whether either of the actions in an android would be considered a malfunction. The comedy also explores the Pygmalion syndrome and competing desires for autonomy and certainty.

== Plot summary ==
Idealistic young writer Adam Trainsmith meets Chandler Tate, a former director of classic comedies, the latter makes a living by directing a never-ending soap opera. The leading-role android makes a series of mistakes. Supporting role android JC-F31-333, laughs at his lapses.

Later, Adam is watching old slapstick comedy, prompting JC-F31-333 to laugh although her reaction sensing humour may be a personal production fault. Adam believes it an advantage, nicknames his favourite android Jacie and persuades Chandler that they should make a comedy for her.

Regional TV director Carla Pepperbloom is jealous of Adam's sympathy for talented Jacie and orders the android's memory wiped. Adam panics and decides to kidnap Jacie. While on the run, Adam and Jacie fall in love.

== Productions ==
Comic Potential is Ayckbourn's fifty-third full-length play. It was first performed at the Stephen Joseph Theatre in Scarborough, North Yorkshire in 1998 and received its West End premiere at the Lyric Theatre, Shaftesbury Avenue in October 1999. Chandler Tate was played by David Soul, and Jacie by Janie Dee, who had created the role in Scarborough. Janie received the 1999 Critics' Circle Theatre Award for Best Actress, a 1999 Evening Standard Award and a 2000 Olivier Award.

== Award nominations ==
- Outer Critics Circle Award for Outstanding Off-Broadway Play (nominated)
- Drama Desk Award for Outstanding Play (nominated)
- Olivier Award for Best Comedy (nominated)
