= Calendar Girls (musical) =

- The Musical
- Original West End promotional art
- Music: Gary Barlow
- Lyrics: Tim Firth; Gary Barlow
- Book: Tim Firth
- Basis: 2003 film Calendar Girls
- Premiere: 14 November 2015: Grand Theatre, Leeds
- Productions: 2015 Leeds; 2016 Salford; 2017 West End; 2018 UK Tour
- Awards: 2017 Best Regional Production WhatsOnStage Awards

Calendar Girls The Musical (previously titled The Girls) is a musical by Gary Barlow and Tim Firth, based on the 2003 film Calendar Girls, which is in turn based on a true story, and the original 2008 play adaptation by Firth.

== Synopsis ==
Annie's husband John dies from leukaemia at an early age. Her close friend, Chris, wants to purchase a comfortable sofa for the visitors' lounge in the hospital where John was treated. She hits upon the idea of printing a calendar featuring some of the members of the Knapely branch of the Women's Institute, discreetly posing nude while engaged in traditional WI activities, such as baking and knitting, in order to raise funds. Her proposal is initially met with great scepticism, but she eventually convinces ten women to participate in the project with her. They enlist one of the hospital workers, an amateur photographer named Lawrence, to help them with the calendar.

== Background ==
The musical is based on the 2003 film Calendar Girls. The film itself was produced on a budget of $10 million, earning over $96 million in global box office receipts. A stage play adaptation was launched in 2008 at the Chichester Festival Theatre, before embarking on a national tour and transferring to the West End's Noël Coward Theatre in 2009.

== Production history ==
=== World premiere: Leeds and Salford (2015–2016) ===
The musical originally made its world premiere under its original title The Girls at the Grand Theatre, Leeds running from 14 November to 12 December 2015, followed by a transfer to The Lowry, Salford from 13 to 30 January 2016. The production was directed by Roger Haines and Tim Firth.

=== West End (2017) ===
Following the Leeds and Salford tryouts, the production transferred to London's West End at the Phoenix Theatre, with an official opening night on 21 February 2017, with previews from 28 January 2017. The production was directed by Tim Firth, with sets and costume design by Rob Jones, lighting by Tim Lutkin, musical staging by Lizzi Gee, comedy staging by Jos Houben, sound design by Terry Jardine and Nick Lidster for Autograph Design, assistant direction by Jack Ryder and James Robert Moore and projection design by Alex Uragllo, The production closed on 15 July 2017.

=== UK and Ireland tours ===
==== Original UK and Ireland tour (2018-19) ====
In 2017 it was announced that the musical would embark a UK tour under a new title; Calendar Girls The Musical. The tour opened on 16 August 2018 with a return visit to the Grand Theatre, Leeds and toured for 15 months until 23 November 2019, ending at the Chichester Festival Theatre (the originating theatre of the original play adaptation).

===== UK tour (2023-24) =====
A new production, with revised score and book and produced by Bill Kenwright, is to begin a UK tour at the Theatre Royal, Windsor in August 2023. The cast includes Tayna Franks, Maureen Nolan, Lyn Paul, Amy Robbins, Paula Tappenden, Marti Webb and Honeysuckle Weeks.

== Musical numbers ==
Act 1

- "Yorkshire"
- "Mrs Conventional"
- "Scarborough"
- "Who Wants a Silent Night?"
- "Very, Slightly, Almost"
- "Spring Fete'
- "The Flowers of Yorkshire"
- "Time Passing"
- "Sunflower"

Act 2

- "Dare"
- "Protect Me Less"
- "Girls (Reprise)"
- "So I've had a Little Work Done"
- "What Age Expects"
- "Killimanjaro"
- "Crazy Paving"
- "Dare (Reprise)"
- "My Russian Friend and I"
- "For One Night Only"
- "Sunflower of Yorkshire"

The London Cast Recording was released on 9 March 2018.

== Cast and characters ==
Character	Leeds and Salford	West End	UK tour	UK tour
Character	2015	2017	2018	2023
Annie	Joanna Riding	Joanna Riding	Anna-Jane Casey; Sarah Jane Buckley	Tanya Franks; Laurie Brett
Chris	Claire Moore	Claire Moore	Rebecca Storm	Amy Robbins; Samantha Seager
Cora	Claire Machin	Claire Machin	Karen Dunbar; Lorraine Bruce; Sue Devaney	Honeysuckle Weeks
Celia	Vivien Parry	Sophie-Louise Dann	Denise Welch; Lisa Maxwell	Marti Webb; Helen Pearson
Jessie	Sarah Kestelman	Michele Dotrice	Ruth Madoc; Lesley Joseph	Lyn Paul
Ruth	Debbie Chazen	Debbie Chazen	Sara Crowe; Julia Hills	Maureen Nolan
Marie	Harriet Thorpe	Marian McLoughlin	Fern Britton; Judy Holt	Paula Tappenden; Liz Carney
John	James Gaddas	James Gaddas	Phil Corbitt	Colin R Campbell
Rod	Joe Caffrey	Joe Caffrey	Ian Mercer	
Dennis	Jeremy Clyde	Jeremy Clyde	Alan Stocks	
Doctor	John Davitt	John Davitt		
Brenda	Susan Fay	Soo Drouet		
Miss Wilson (coffee)	Karen West	Jenny Gayner	Ellie Leah	
Miss Wilson (tea)	Shirley Jameson	Shirley Jameson	Catherine Digges	
Lawrence	Steve Giles	Steve Giles		
Colin	Stephen Boswell	Maxwell Hutcheon	Sebastian Aberneri	
Lady Cravenshire	Judith Street	Judith Street	Pauline Daniels	
Tommo	Josh Benson	Josh Benson	Tyler Dobbs	
Danny	Ben Hunter	Ben Hunter	Danny Howker	
Jenny	Chloe May Jackson	Chloe May Jackson	Isabel Caswell	
Ensemble	David Breeds; Sarah Day	Frazer Hadfield; Jane Lambert; Rebecca Louis	James Leeman; Michelle Whitney	

Year	Award Ceremony	Category	Nominee	Result
2017	WhatsOnStage Awards	Best Regional Production		Won
2017	Laurence Olivier Award	Best New Musical		Nominated
2017	Laurence Olivier Award	Best Actress in a Musical	"The Girls" - Debbie Chazen, Sophie-Louise Dann, Michele Dotrice, Claire Machin, Claire Moore and Joanna Riding	Nominated
2017	Laurence Olivier Award	Best Actor in a Supporting Role in a Musical	Ben Hunter	Nominated
