= Ripley and Scuff =

UK television series

- Genre: Children's television Comedy
- Created by: Tim Firth; Gordon Firth
- Starring: Nigel Plaskitt; Andy Heath; Gillie Robic; Simon Buckley; Neil Sterenberg; Katherine Smee; Amanda Abbington
- Country of origin: United Kingdom
- Original language: English
- No. of series: 2

Production
- Running time: 20 minutes

Original release
- Network: ITV (CITV) (UK); BFBS (Germany)
- Release: 7 January 2002 – 28 February 2003

Ripley and Scuff is a children's programme that was produced for ITV's children's strand CITV, and originally aired from 7 January 2002 to 28 February 2003. The show is a spin off to the highly successful Roger and the Rottentrolls.

== Plot ==
The show focuses Ripley and Scuff along with their sister Strid and their pet barguest Bargie visiting schools across the United Kingdom and wreaking havoc.

At the end of the visit, Ripley's band Ripley's Rascals play the theme tune, with Ripley on the drums, Scuff on the guitar, Strid on the keyboard, and Bargie on the glockenspiel.

== Characters ==
- Ripley – the leader of the gang but isn't very clever. Ripley is also the son of Sigsworthy Crags from Roger & The Rottentrolls.
- Scuff – the least intelligent one and usually gets things wrong. Scuff is also the son of Sigsworthy Crags from Roger & The Rottentrolls.
- Strid – their sister who is the most clever and often calls Ripley and scuff "Silly Spoons!". Strid is also the daughter of Kettlewell from Roger & The Rottentrolls.
- Bargie – a baby barguest from Roger & The Rottentrolls.
- Grandad Gordon – a man who does art and craft with the kids of the school.
- The Story Princess – a princess that reads stories to the children (from Series 2). In the first series, the stories were read out by either Ripley, Scuff or Strid.

== Trivia ==
- When CITV promoted the first series, the 'Sneaky Peek' feature had the theme from its predecessor Roger & The Rottentrolls playing instead of the tune for Ripley & Scuff.
- Ripley, Scuff and Strid made an appearance in the CITV studio on the launch day of the first series, on 7 January 2002.
- The second series was frequently repeated on CITV between 2006 and 2010.
- Strid being the sister of Ripley & Scuff contradicts the events of the predecessor series: Roger & The Rottentrolls as Sigsworthy Crags had a wife (Ripley & Scuff's biological mother) who is a completely different character to Strid's biological mother, Kettlewell (who, as far as we know; never married Sigsworthy).
