= Debbie Chazen =

English actress (born 1971)

- Born: 1 September 1971 (age 55); Hammersmith, London, England
- Education: London Academy of Music and Dramatic Art
- Years active: 1997–present
- Partner: Michael Korel

Deborah Chazen (born 1 September 1971) is an English actress. She is best known for portraying Annie in the BBC comedy The Smoking Room, Big Claire in Mine All Mine, and various roles in the BBC sketch show Tittybangbang. Alongside these appearances, Chazen has had recurring roles on Trollied and Holby City.

== Early life ==
Chazen was born in Hammersmith, London. After graduating from Manchester University in 1992 with a degree in Russian Studies, she trained at LAMDA.

== Career ==
Chazen has appeared in the Mike Leigh film Topsy Turvy, and other films, such as A Christmas Carol, and the 2001 version of The Life and Adventures of Nicholas Nickleby.

On television, she has acted in Gimme Gimme Gimme, Mile High, EastEnders and Lucy Sullivan Is Getting Married.

Her theatre work includes Mother Clap's Molly House at the National Theatre, Dick Whittington and His Cat at the Barbican Theatre, and Anton Chekhov's The Cherry Orchard in Sheffield. In 2006, she played Maribel in a new play called Crooked at the Bush Theatre, for which she received acclaim. An article in the International Herald Tribune compared the quality of her performance to the likes of Judi Dench and Maggie Smith. Another role that she played to great acclaim was Tessa in The Girlfriend Experience, which she performed at the Royal Court Theatre and the Young Vic.

Chazen appeared in two episodes of Midsomer Murders, one episode of Doc Martin, and in the 2007 Doctor Who episode "Voyage of the Damned". In November and December 2008, she played Milton's sister Susan in Another Case of Milton Jones on BBC Radio 4. Chazen starred as Ruth in the stage play Calendar Girls from November 2009 to January 2010 at the Noël Coward in Leicester Square, during which time she was diagnosed with breast cancer and had to withdraw halfway through the run in order to start treatment. She made a full recovery, and returned to Calendar Girls in the same role for a national tour at the end of 2010.

Chazen had a running story line in Doctors in 2010 as Sissy Juggins, who, along with her brother Ivor Juggins, kidnapped Dr. Jimmi Clay, and was nominated for a British Soap Award. Chazen has also appeared in an episode of EastEnders as Minty's blind date, and two episodes of Coronation Street as Miriam. She toured Calendar Girls from August to December 2011. In 2013, she appeared in the Sky 1 comedy series Trollied. She played Ludmilla in the play The Duck House, The show transferred to London's Vaudeville Theatre after a five-week tour.

Chazen appeared on television as Ludmilla in Ambassadors. In 2014, she appeared in the Sherlock episode "The Sign of Three", and on 19 June 2014, it was announced that she would be joining the cast of Holby City. She subsequently appeared as Jessica in Agatha Raisin and the Walkers of Dembley.

In 2017, Chazen played Ruth in The Girls at the Phoenix Theatre in the West End.

== Filmography ==
=== Film ===
Year	Title	Role	Notes
1998	Tess of the D'Urbervilles	Marian	TV film
1999	Topsy-Turvy	Miss Kingsley	
1999	A Christmas Carol	Fred's Maid	TV film
2001	Barnie's Minor Annoyances	Jenny	Original title: Barnie et ses petites contrariétés
2001	The Life and Adventures of Nicholas Nickleby	Fanny Squeers	TV film
2001	Beginner's Luck	Charlotte	
2004	Tooth	Fat Fairy	
2004	Suzie Gold	Miriam Jacobs	
2005	Feeder	Pam	Short film
2009	I Am Ruthie Segal, Hear Me Roar		Short film
2010	Anton Chekhov's the Duel	Olga	
2013	Gnomeland	Suzanne	Short film
2018	Ploey: You Never Fly Alone	Cormorant/Swan	Voice role, English version
2018	Red Joan	Karen	
2021	Pops	Suzie Jacobs	Short film

=== Television ===
Year	Title	Role	Notes
1997	The Lakes	Delilah	Recurring role, 3 episodes
1998	An Unsuitable Job for a Woman	Joanna	Episode: "A Last Embrace"
1998	Killer Net	Sandra	TV mini-series
1998	The Ruth Rendell Mysteries	Jackie	Episode: "You Can't Be Too Careful"
1998	The Bill	Nuala Hill	Episode: "Team Play"
1999	Midsomer Murders	Anna Santarosa	Episode: "Strangler's Wood"
1999–2000	Lucy Sullivan Is Getting Married	Meredia	Series regular, 16 episodes
2000	Casualty	Danielle Adams	Episode: "Blood Brothers"
2001	Gimme Gimme Gimme	Art Teacher	Episode: "Decoy"
2002	The Estate Agents	Angie	Episode: "Night Out"
2002	Holby City	Bernice Webster	Episode: "Facing Facts"
2003	Grass	Jenny	Series 1, episode 7
2004	Mine All Mine	Big Claire	Series regular, 6 episodes
2004–2005	The Smoking Room	Annie	Series regular, 17 episodes
2005	EastEnders	Shivorne	Episode: "5 May 2005"
2005	The Bill	Kathy Jones	Episode: "Use of Protocol"
2005	Murder in Suburbia	Estelle Harcourt	Episode: "Dogs"
2005	Mile High	Terri	Series 2, episode 26
2005	Doctors	Meriel Croston	Episode: "Something to Hold Onto"
2005–2007	Tittybangbang	Various roles	Series regular, 8 episodes
2007	Doc Martin	Alison Lane	Episode: "The Apple Doesn't Fall"
2007	Doctor Who	Foon Van Hoff	Episode: "Voyage of the Damned"
2007	Comedy Showcase	Garvey	Episode: "The Eejits"
2008	Midsomer Murders	Gemma Platt	Episode: "Midsomer Life"
2008	Uncle Max	Bride	Episode: "Uncle Max Goes to a Wedding"
2009	Psychoville	Kelly Su Crabtree	Recurring role, 4 episodes
2009	We Are Klang	May	Recurring role, 4 episodes
2009	The Impressions Show with Culshaw and Stephenson	Daggy	Series 1, episode 6
2010	Doctors	Sissy Juggins	Recurring role, 12 episodes
2010–2011	Coronation Street	Miriam	Recurring role, 5 episodes
2011	White Van Man	Pauline	Episode: "The Morning After"
2013	Holby City	Colette Barnes	Episode: "Only Human"
2013	Great Night Out	Shop Assistant	Series 1, episode 6
2013	Trollied	Sarah	Recurring role, 3 episodes
2013	Ambassadors	Ludmilla	TV mini-series
2013	The Spa	Davina	Series regular, 8 episodes
2014	Sherlock	Vicky	Episode: "The Sign of Three"
2014	The Job Lot	Joy Coleman	Series 2, Episode 4
2014–2019	Holby City	Fleur Fanshawe	Recurring role, 13 episodes
2015	Asylum	Mercedes	Episode: "Public Relations"
2015	You, Me and the Apocalypse	Myrta	Episode: "T Minus..."
2016	Agatha Raisin	Jessica Tarnick	Episode: "The Walkers of Dembley"
2018–2020	The Last Kingdom	Sable	Recurring role, 6 episodes
2019	Dead Pixels	Cara	Recurring role, 3 episodes
2019	Sticks and Stones	Natalie	TV mini-series
2020	Urban Myths	Beatrice Molinsky	Episode: "When Joan Kissed Barbra"
2024	Sister Boniface Mysteries	Octavia Hemlock	Series 3, episode 2: "House of Misfit Dolls"
