= Tim Firth =

English dramatist, screenwriter and songwriter

- Born: 13 October 1964 (age 61); Frodsham, Cheshire, England
- Occupations: Dramatist, screenwriter, songwriter
- Notable work: Roger and the Rottentrolls

Tim Firth (born 13 October 1964) is an English dramatist, screenwriter and songwriter.

== Life and career ==
Firth was born in Frodsham, England. He spent much of his time at school writing songs and it was only a few weeks before going to King's College, Cambridge to read English that he attended an Arvon Foundation course in West Yorkshire. This was run by Willy Russell and whilst on it, Firth had to write dialogue. He wrote about the only thing he knew - two sixteen-year-olds trying to write a song. Another course participant optioned it for his production company and Firth decided to become a writer. While at Cambridge he joined the Footlights where his contemporaries included fellow King's student David Baddiel who later invited him to contribute music to The Mary Whitehouse Experience on BBC radio. His first plays at this time were all directed by Sam Mendes.

On leaving Cambridge, he wrote and composed music for the award winning Radio Four series And Now In Colour but was soon invited to meet Alan Ayckbourn in Scarborough and commissioned to write a play for the studio at the Stephen Joseph Theatre. His one-act play A Man of Letters was a success and led to the commissioning of a full-length play from Ayckbourn, Neville's Island, which later transferred to the West End, has been seen in translation all round the world and has been in almost continuous production since its premiere. It was revived in the West End in 2014 at the Duke of York's Theatre.

Along with his father, Gordon Firth, he created the TV series Roger and the Rottentrolls, running for four series' and winning a BAFTA. The spin off series Ripley and Scuff also won a BAFTA, and more recently the Radio Times voted the original series one of the 50 Greatest Children's TV Shows of All Time.

During two successive Christmas runs, the stage version of Firth's TV film The Flint Street Nativity at the Liverpool Playhouse became the most successful Christmas production in the theatre's history. His play Calendar Girls, adapted by Firth from his own film, found favour with audiences across Britain during its 2008/09 tour. In the process it broke the all-time British box-office record for a play and also continued to sell out during its months in the West End. A 2026 production premiering at the Stephen Joseph Theatre was nominated for Best Musical Production at the UK Theatre Awards. The musical has raised almost £1 million for Blood Cancer UK during its lifetime.

2013 marked the premiere of Firth's first solo musical, This Is My Family for which he wrote book, lyrics and music. Directed by Daniel Evans, it premiered at the Crucible Theatre on 19 June 2013, and then embarked on a UK national tour, starting at the Lyceum Theatre in Sheffield in October 2014. This Is My Family won the UK Theatre Award for Best New Musical and Sian Phillips won Best Supporting Actress.

The Girls, directed by Tim Firth, and co-written with Gary Barlow opened at the Phoenix Theatre, London in 2017, winning a WhatsOnStage Award and being nominated for three Olivier Awards. As Calendar Girls: The Musical, it embarked on a national tour in 2018.

In September 2017, Firth’s new musical The Band, featuring the music of Take That, was premiered at the Manchester Opera House, prior to a national tour. It had a West End season at the Theatre Royal Haymarket in 2018.

His second musical for which he wrote book, music and lyrics, Now Is Good, premiered at Chester Storyhouse in 2022 and was nominated for Best Musical in the 2022 UK Theatre Awards.

His play The Ladies Football Club, which Firth adapted from Ladies Football Club by Stefano Massini, premiered at the Sheffield Crucible in 2026.

In 2004, Firth released a solo album, Harmless Flirting, completing a tour of words and music with fellow playwright Willy Russell that won positive reviews at the Edinburgh Festival.

For television, his TV credits include Money For Nothing (which won a Writer’s Guild Award), Roger and the Rottentrolls (winner of a BAFTA Award), Cruise of the Gods, The Flint Street Nativity, All Quiet on the Preston Front (winning a Writer’s Guild Award, British Comedy Award, Royal Television Society Award and BAFTA nomination). Tim also produced a season of single comedy plays entitled Trapped, and wrote the Sky Arts single drama Timeless.

Tim’s film credits include Blackball (2002), Calendar Girls (2002, which won a British Comedy Award) and Kinky Boots (2004, Best International Film, Florida Film Festival), and The Wedding Video (2014).

In 2004, Firth became a Companion of The Liverpool Institute for Performing Arts.

In March 2010, Firth was awarded an honorary Doctor of Letters, honoris causa by the University of Chester.

== Theatre work ==
- The Ladies Football Club (2026) - Adaptation of Ladies Football Club by Stefano Massini
- Now Is Good (2022)
- A Different Stage (2022)
- Greatest Days (previously titled The Band) (2017)
- Calendar Girls (2015)
- This Is My Family (2013) - Awarded Best New Musical - UK Theatre Awards, (including Best Supporting Actress for Sian Philips)
- Neville's Island (revival) Chichester (2013)
- Our House (2003) - 2003 Olivier Award for Best New Musical (Hilton Award for Best Musical)
- Calendar Girls (2008) - What's On Stage Award for Best New Comedy
- Absolutely Frank / Sign of the Times (2009) - (developed from A Man Of Letters (1991)
- The Flint Street Nativity (2006)
- The Safari Party (2002)
- Neville’s Island (1992) - Nominated for Olivier Award for Best Comedy, 1995

== Selected filmography as writer (or co-writer) ==
- Greatest Days (2023)
- The Wedding Video (2012)
- Kinky Boots (2005)
- Calendar Girls (2003)
- Blackball (2003)

== Television films ==
- Trapped (also executive producer) - trip of comedy plays (2004)
- Cruise of the Gods - single comedy (2003)
- Border Cafe - TV series (2000)
- The Flint Street Nativity - TV comedy (1999)
- Neville's Island - TV comedy (1998)
- Once Upon a Time in the North (1994)
- All Quiet on the Preston Front (1994)
