= Phoenix Theatre, London =

West End theatre in London

Phoenix Theatre
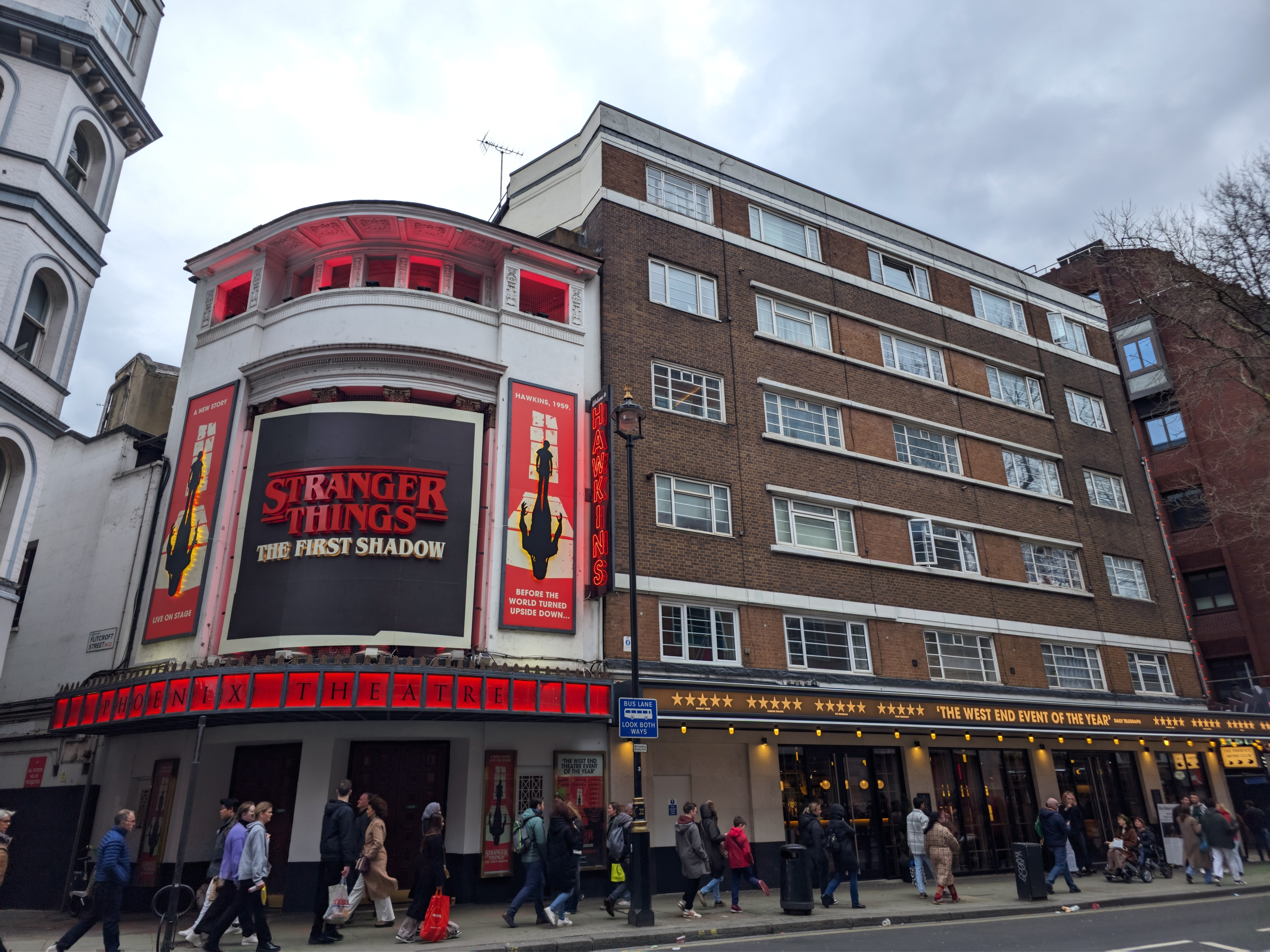
- Phoenix Theatre in 2024
- Interactive map of Phoenix Theatre
- Address: Charing Cross Road; London, WC2; United Kingdom
- Coordinates: 51°30′52″N 0°07′46″W
- Owner: ATG Entertainment
- Capacity: 1,012 on 3 levels
- Type: West End theatre
- Production: Stranger Things: The First Shadow
- Public transit: Tottenham Court Road

Construction
- Opened: 24 September 1930; 96 years ago
- Architects: Giles Gilbert Scott, Bertie Crewe and Cecil Masey

Website
- www.thephoenixtheatre.co.uk

The Phoenix Theatre is a West End theatre in the London Borough of Camden, located in Charing Cross Road (on the corner of Flitcroft Street). The entrances are on Phoenix Street and Charing Cross Road. The Phoenix Theatre was built on a site of a former factory which was later replaced by a music hall named the Alcazar.

== Description ==
Built for Sidney Bernstein, Baron Bernstein, the theatre was designed by Sir Giles Gilbert Scott, Bertie Crewe and Cecil Massey. It has a restrained neoclassical exterior, but an interior designed in an Italianate style by director and designer Theodore Komisarjevsky. Vladimir Polunin copied works by Tintoretto, Titian, Pinturicchio, and Giorgione. It has a fire curtain that depicts Jacopo del Sellaio's The Triumph of Love.

There are golden engravings in the auditorium, and red seats, carpets and curtains. This look is based on traditional Italian theatres. There are decorated ceilings and sculpted wooden doors throughout the building.

It opened on 24 September 1930 with the premiere of Private Lives by Noël Coward, who also appeared in the play, with Adrienne Allen, Gertrude Lawrence and Laurence Olivier. Coward returned to the theatre with Tonight at 8.30, a series of ten plays, in 1936 and Quadrille in 1952.

On 16 December 1969, the long association with Coward was celebrated with a midnight matinee in honour of his 70th birthday, and the foyer bar was renamed the Noel Coward Bar.

== Productions ==
The Phoenix has had a number of successful plays including Norman Ginsbury's Viceroy Sarah in 1935, and John Gielgud's Love for Love during the Second World War. Harlequinade and The Browning Version, two plays by Terence Rattigan, opened on 8 September 1948 at the theatre. In 1950, it staged Frederick Lonsdale's final play The Way Things Go.

In the mid-1950s, Paul Scofield and Peter Brook appeared at the theatre. In 1968, a musical version of Chaucer's The Canterbury Tales opened and ran for around two thousand performances. Night and Day, a 1978 play by Tom Stoppard, ran for two years.

The theatre hosted many musicals in the 1980s and 1990s, including The Biograph Girl with Sheila White, The Baker's Wife by Stephen Schwartz directed by Trevor Nunn, and Into the Woods by Stephen Sondheim, starring Julia McKenzie. There were also a number of plays by William Shakespeare. Its first pantomime was Snow White and the Seven Dwarfs starring Dana in 1983.

The production of Blood Brothers, the Willy Russell musical that transferred from the Noël Coward Theatre in November 1991, ended a 21-year run on 10 November 2012 after becoming the longest-running production at the theatre, following limited engagements of Goodnight Mister Tom and Midnight Tango. The theatre then played host to the original West End production of Broadway musical Once, which opened in April 2013 and closed on 21 March 2015.

Bend It Like Beckham the Musical, Guys and Dolls and The Last Tango played in 2016, with Dirty Dancing and Peppa Pig's Surprise comprising the 2016 Christmas season.

The Girls, a musical by Gary Barlow and Tim Firth based on the Calendar Girls film, played at the Phoenix Theatre with previews from 28 January 2017, and officially opened on 21 February 2017. The production closed on 15 July 2017.

Chicago opened at the Phoenix Theatre on 11 April 2018, starring Cuba Gooding Jr. as Billy Flynn, Sarah Soetaert as Roxie Hart, Josefina Gabrielle as Velma Kelly, and Ruthie Henshall as Mama Morton. A cast change saw Martin Kemp take over the role of Billy Flynn, with Alexandra Burke as Roxie Hart and Mazz Murray as Mama Morton. Denise Van Outen was due to take over as Velma Kelly, however a foot injury meant that Josefina Gabrielle returned to the role. The show closed on 5 January 2019.

In June 2018, it was announced that the hit Broadway musical Come from Away would transfer to the Phoenix, which it did in February 2019. The production closed on 7 January 2023. The production Idiots Assemble: Spitting Image The Musical would play at the Phoenix for a limited run from 24 May until 26 August 2023.

Previews of Stranger Things: The First Shadow, based on the hit Netflix show, began on 17 November 2023. It officially opened on 14 December, and is set to close on 27 December 2026. In October 2026, it was reported that previews of Quentin Tarantino's play The Popinjay Cavalier would begin on 23 February 2027, before its official debut at the Phoenix Theatre on 18 March.

The theatre is owned by the Ambassador Theatre Group. Since 1973 it has been a Grade II Listed Building.

== See also ==
- Phoenix Garden
