= Christmas Carol Goes Wrong =

2025 play

- Original language: English
- Written by: Henry Lewis; Jonathan Sayer; Henry Shields
- Based on: A Christmas Carol by: Charles Dickens; A Christmas Carol Goes Wrong (BBC TV special)
- Genre: Comedy

Premiere
- Date: 2 November 2025
- Place: The Lowry, Salford

Christmas Carol Goes Wrong is a comedy play by Henry Lewis, Jonathan Sayer, and Henry Shields of the Mischief Theatre company, based on their 2017 BBC television special.

== Premise ==
Similar to Mischief Theatre's Peter Pan Goes Wrong and The Play That Goes Wrong, the fictitious Cornley Polytechnic Drama Society attempts to stage an adaptation of Charles Dickens's A Christmas Carol which is repeatedly ruined by the amateurism and personal rivalries of the cast and crew.

== Production ==
The play, directed by Matt DiCarlo and premiered at The Lowry, Salford on 2 November 2025, before touring the UK until 1 March 2026. The tour included a Christmas season at the Apollo Theatre in London's West End from 6 December 2025 to 26 January 2026. Casting was announced on 12 July 2025, including members of the original Mischief Theatre company.

The tour resumed at the Churchill Theatre, Bromley on 27 October 2026, with a new cast until 7 March 2027, including another Christmas season at the Wyndham's Theatre in London's West End from 18 December 2026 to 23 January 2027. The original 2025-26 cast will return for the runs in Manchester and Portsmouth on the tour, before transferring the play to the for its North American premiere at the Ahmanson Theatre, Los Angeles from December 12, 2026 until January 10, 2027. The play will also be performed in Australia at Home of the Arts, Gold Coast from 1 to 12 December and Sydney Opera House from 17 to 29 December 2026.

== Cast and characters ==
Character	UK tour/West End	Los Angeles	UK tour/West End	Australia
Character	2025-26	2026-27		
Max Young Scrooge	Matt Cavendish	Matt Cavendish	Dave Hearn Jay Olpin	Anthony Craig
Chris Scrooge	Daniel Fraser	Daniel Fraser	Adam Elliot	Douglas Hansell
Sandra Belle	Sasha Frost	Sasha Frost	Ashley Tucker	Jess Rogers
Trevor Ghost of Christmas Future	Chris Leask	Chris Leask	Aein Nasseri	Jack Buchanan
Robert Ghost of Christmas Present	Henry Lewis	Henry Lewis	Matthew Howell	Joe Kosky
Dennis Bob Cratchit	Jonathan Sayer	Jonathan Sayer	James Akka	Zak Vasiliou
Annie Fred	Dumile Sibanda Nancy Zamit	Allie Dart	Dumile Sibanda	Melanie Bird
Jonathan Jacob Marley	Greg Tannahill	Greg Tannahill	Luke Pierre	Brodie Masini
