= Groan Ups =

Comedic play

- Original language: English
- Written by: Henry Lewis; Jonathan Sayer; Henry Shields
- Genre: Comedy

Premiere
- Date: 20 September 2019
- Place: Vaudeville Theatre

Groan Ups is a comedy play by Henry Lewis, Jonathan Sayer and Henry Shields of Mischief Theatre.

== Plot summary ==
The play revolves around the relationships between five school-friends are explored at three stages of their lives: in Year Two in 1994, Year Nine in 2001, and at a school reunion in the present day.

== Productions ==
The play opened on 20 September 2019 and ran until 1 December 2019 at the Vaudeville Theatre in London's West End, making it the third Mischief Theatre production running simultaneously alongside The Play That Goes Wrong and The Comedy About a Bank Robbery. The cast performed a scene from the play on the 2019 Royal Variety Performance.

The play was to begin a UK tour in August 2020, however due to the COVID-19 pandemic it was postponed and opened at the Theatre Royal, Bath on 12 August 2021.

== Cast and characters ==
Characters	London (2019)	UK tour (2021)
Chemise	Bryony Corrigan	Jamie Birkett
Paul	Dave Hearn	Killian Macardle
Spencer	Henry Lewis	Dharmesh Patel
Simon	Jonathan Sayer	Matt Cavendish
Archie	Henry Shields	Daniel Abbott
Katie	Charlie Russell	Lauren Samuels
Moon	Nancy Zamit	Yolanda Ovide
Understudies	Paul Brown	Paul Brown
Understudies	Krystal Dockery	
Understudies	George Haynes	
Understudies	Holly Sumpton	Holly Sumpton
