= Bryony Corrigan =

English actress

- Born: Bryony Rebecca Corrigan; 12 August 1992 (age 34); Cullercoats, England
- Education: London Academy of Music and Dramatic Art
- Years active: 2014–present
- Spouse: Peter Hannah (m. 2025)

Bryony Rebecca Corrigan (born 12 August 1992) is an English actress. She is known for her work in theatre, particularly with Mischief Theatre, and received a WhatsOnStage Award nomination. On television, she was part of the cast of The Goes Wrong Show (2019–2021).

== Early life ==
Corrigan was born in Cullercoats, North Tyneside. She attended Marden High School and St Thomas More RC Academy, as well as being a member of various local youth theatre and dance groups. She graduated from the London Academy of Music and Dramatic Art (LAMDA).

== Career ==
Corrigan joined Mischief Theatre, appearing in Lights! Camera! Improvise! at the 2014 Edinburgh Fringe Festival. In 2015, she made her television debut in episodes of the soap opera Holby City and Inspector George Gently and appeared in How I Learned to Drive at Southwark Playhouse. She did her first voice work for the video game Dark Souls III: Ashes of Ariandel. Through Mischief Theatre, Corrigan made her West End debut as Sandra in The Play That Goes Wrong at the Duchess Theatre. She reprised her role in Peter Pan Goes Wrong at the Apollo Theatre and had small roles in the television films Peter Pan Goes Wrong and A Christmas Carol Goes Wrong. In 2018, she starred in the Live Theatre Company productions of My Romantic History and A Clear Light.

In 2019, Corrigan returned to the Mischief Theatre franchise. She starred as Chemise and Spitzmaus in the plays Groan Ups and Magic Goes Wrong respectively. The former premiered at The Lowry, while both had runs at the Vaudeville Theatre in the West End. She began starring as Vanessa Wilcox-Wynn-Carroway in the BBC One comedy series The Goes Wrong Show and played Virtue Device in the Amazon Prime series Good Omens.

Corrigan portrayed the late Jo Cox MP in the 2022 ITV true crime miniseries The Walk-In. She voiced Amy in the BBC Radio 4 audio drama Our Friends in the North and appeared in Good Luck, Studio. The following year, she starred as Cynthia Billen in Notes from a Small Island at the Watermill Theatre and Katie Jenkins in I, Daniel Blake at the Theatre Royal Stratford East. For her performance in the latter, Corrigan was nominated for Best Supporting Performance at the 2023 UK Theatre Awards and Best Supporting Performer in a Play at the 2024 WhatsOnStage Awards. She also had voice roles in the video games Baldur's Gate III and Dragon Age: The Veilguard and appeared in the Amazon Prime series My Lady Jane.

In 2025, Corrigan played in the ITV true crime drama I Fought the Law. She reunited with Mischief Theatre for the West End run of The Comedy about Spies at the Adelphi Theatre.

== Personal life ==
In 2023, Corrigan became engaged to Scottish actor Peter Hannah. The couple married at Pitzhanger Manor in West London on 5 September 2025.

== Filmography ==
Year	Title	Role	Notes
2015	Holby City	Josie Simmons	Episode: "We Have the Technology"
2015	Inspector George Gently	Nurse	Episode: "Breathe in the Air"
2016	Peter Pan Goes Wrong	Crew Member	Television film
2017	A Christmas Carol Goes Wrong	Receptionist	Television film
2019	Good Omens	Virtue Device	2 episodes
2019–2021	The Goes Wrong Show	Vanessa Wilcock-Wynn-Carroway	Main role
2022	The Walk-In	Jo Cox	1 episode
2024	Dead Cells: Immortalis	Laure Esposito	Voice role, miniseries
2024	My Lady Jane	Esther	2 episodes
2025	I Fought the Law	WPC Elliot	
TBA	Anansi Boys	Shanelle	
TBA	Damaged Goods	Quinn	Film

=== Video games ===
Year	Title	Role	Notes
2016	Dark Souls III: Ashes of Ariandel	The Painter	
2023	Baldur's Gate III	Various	
2024	Dragon Age: The Veilguard	Rook	
2025	GreedFall 2: The Dying World	Vriden Gerr	
TBA	Star Citizen		

== Stage ==
Year	Title	Role	Notes
2014	Lights! Camera! Improvise		Edinburgh Fringe Festival
2015	How I Learned to Drive	Teenage Greek Chorus	Southwark Playhouse, London
2016	The Play That Goes Wrong	Sandra	Duchess Theatre, London
2017	Peter Pan Goes Wrong	Sandra	Apollo Theatre, London
2018	My Romantic History	Amy	Live Theatre Company, Newcastle upon Tyne
2018	Clear White Light	Alison	Live Theatre Company, Newcastle upon Tyne
2019	Magic Goes Wrong	Spitzmaus	The Lowry, Salford / Vaudeville Theatre, London
2019	Groan Ups	Chemise	Vaudeville Theatre, London
2022	Good Luck, Studio	Saoirse	Salisbury Playhouse
2023	Notes from a Small Island	Cynthia Billen	Watermill Theatre, Newbury
2023	I, Daniel Blake	Katie Jenkins	Theatre Royal Stratford East
2026	The Comedy about Spies	Elena Popova	Adelphi Theatre, London
2027	The Popinjay Cavalier	TBA	Phoenix Theatre, London

== Audio ==
Year	Title	Role	Notes
2022	Our Friends in the North	Amy	BBC Radio 4
2023	Call Jonathan Pie	Callers	BBC Radio 4

== Awards and nominations ==
Year	Award	Category	Work	Result	Ref.
2023	UK Theatre Awards	Best Supporting Performance	I, Daniel Blake	Nominated	
2024	WhatsOnStage Awards	Best Supporting Performer in a Play	I, Daniel Blake	Nominated	
