= Magic Goes Wrong =

British comedy play

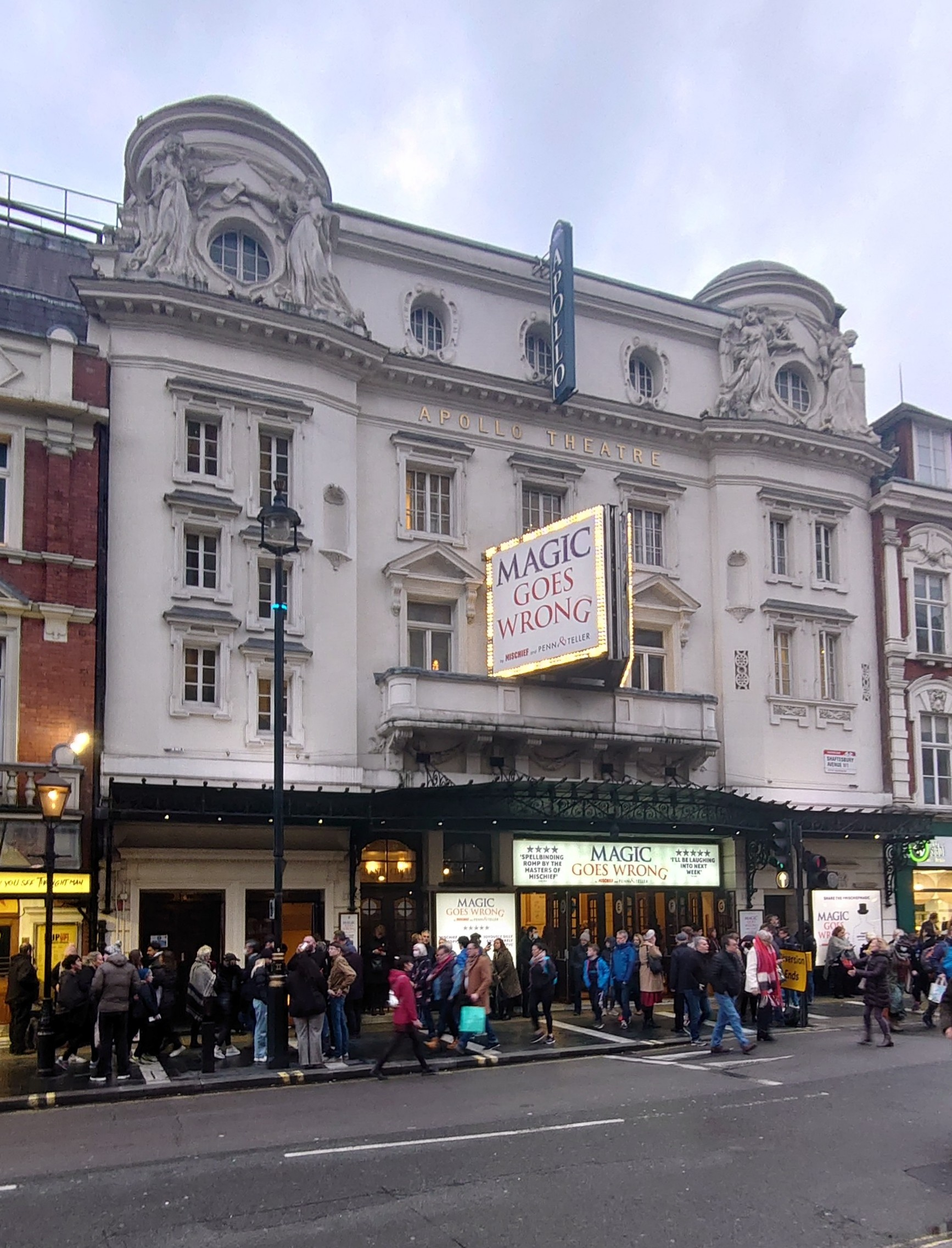
- Original language: English
- Written by: Henry Lewis, Jonathan Sayer; Henry Shields; Penn Jillette; Teller
- Genre: Comedy; Magic

Premiere
- Date: 6 August 2019
- Place: The Lowry, Salford
- Official website

Magic Goes Wrong is a comedy play by Henry Lewis, Jonathan Sayer, Henry Shields (of Mischief Theatre Company) and Penn & Teller. It follows the series of Mischief's Goes Wrong series of plays following The Play That Goes Wrong and Peter Pan Goes Wrong.

== Production history ==
The play opened in the Quays Theatre at The Lowry, Salford from 6 to 11 August 2019, prior to its opening in London's West End at the Vaudeville Theatre from 14 December 2019. It is notable for employing a far greater level of black comedy than previous instalments in the Goes Wrong series, including many on-stage gory demises for the guest characters. Although, slightly paradoxically, the ending is considerably more upbeat and sentimental than the group's other productions.

The play was the third Mischief production running simultaneously in the West End alongside the long-running productions of The Play That Goes Wrong and The Comedy About a Bank Robbery (until its closure in March 2020), and the fourth in London while Peter Pan Goes Wrong played the Christmas 2019 season at the Alexandra Palace.

In March 2020, the play stopped performances due to the COVID-19 pandemic. The play resumed its London run on 21 October 2021 at a new venue, the Apollo Theatre. A UK tour commenced at the Curve, Leicester from 20 July 2021.

A spin-off centered on the character of the Mind Mangler, titled Mind Mangler: Member of the Tragic Circle, opened in the West End at the Apollo Theatre on 14 March 2024.

== Cast and characters ==
Characters	London (2019)	UK tour (2021)	London (2021)
Spitzmaus	Bryony Corrigan	Jocelyn Prah	
Eugenia	Roxy Faridany	Valerie Cutko	Genevieve Nicole
The Blade	Dave Hearn	Kiefer Moriarty	Kazeem Tosin Amore
Mind Mangler	Henry Lewis	Rory Fairbairn	Henry Lewis
Mickey	Jonathan Sayer	Daniel Anthony	Sydney K Smith
Sophisticato	Henry Shields	Sam Hill	Shane David-Joseph
Bär	Nancy Zamit	Chloe Tannenbaum	
Madam Escapade			Jane Milligan
Peg			Louise Beresford
Martina			Nancy Zamit
Mel			Scott Hunter
Understudies	Natasha Culley	Ishbel Cumming	Steph De Whalley
Understudies	Lauren Ingram	Ricky Oakley	Christian James
Understudies	Laurence Pears	CJ Field	Tom Wainwright
Understudies	Sydney K Smith	Jay Olpin	
Understudies	Liv Spencer		

== Awards and nominations ==
Year	Award	Category	Nominee	Result
2020	Laurence Olivier Awards	Best Entertainment or Comedy Play		Nominated
2022	WhatsOnStage Awards	Best New Play		Shortlisted
2022	WhatsOnStage Awards	Best West End Show		Shortlisted
2022	WhatsOnStage Awards	Best Performer in a Male Identifying Role in a Play	Henry Lewis	Shortlisted
2022	WhatsOnStage Awards	Best Supporting Performer in a Male Identifying Role in a Play	Jonathan Sayer	Shortlisted
2022	WhatsOnStage Awards	Best Supporting Performer in a Female Identifying Role in a Play	Nancy Zamit	Shortlisted
