= Henry Lewis (playwright) =

British playwright and actor

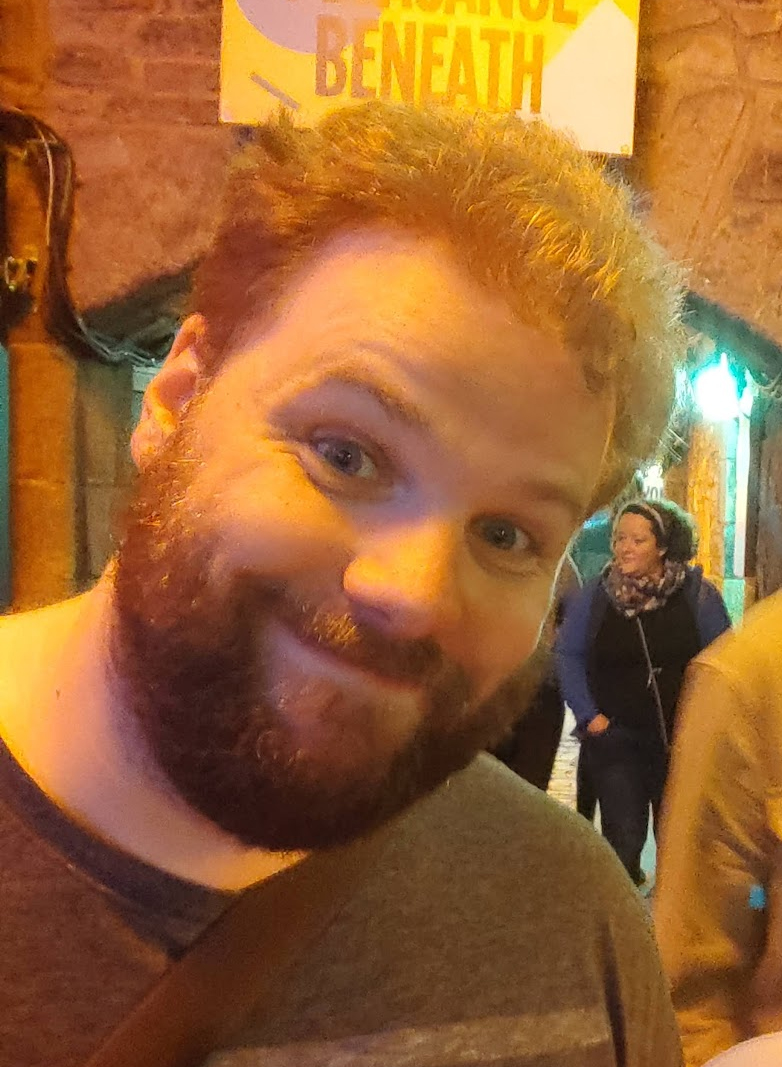
- Lewis in 2022
- Born: Henry William Lewis; 21 November 1988 (age 37); Slough, Berkshire, England
- Education: London Academy of Music and Dramatic Art
- Occupations: Actor; Writer; Director; Producer; Presenter
- Years active: 2008–present

Henry William Lewis (born 21 November 1988) is a British actor and playwright. He co-founded British comedy theatre company Mischief, and co-wrote and starred in The Play That Goes Wrong, Peter Pan Goes Wrong, The Comedy About a Bank Robbery, The Comedy About Spies, Groan Ups, Magic Goes Wrong, Mind Mangler, Christmas Carol Goes Wrong, and The Goes Wrong Show for the BBC1, and co-hosts Riddiculous, an ITV1 daytime quiz show. Lewis also stars as D.U.M.-E. in Marvel Studios' VisionQuest.

== Career ==
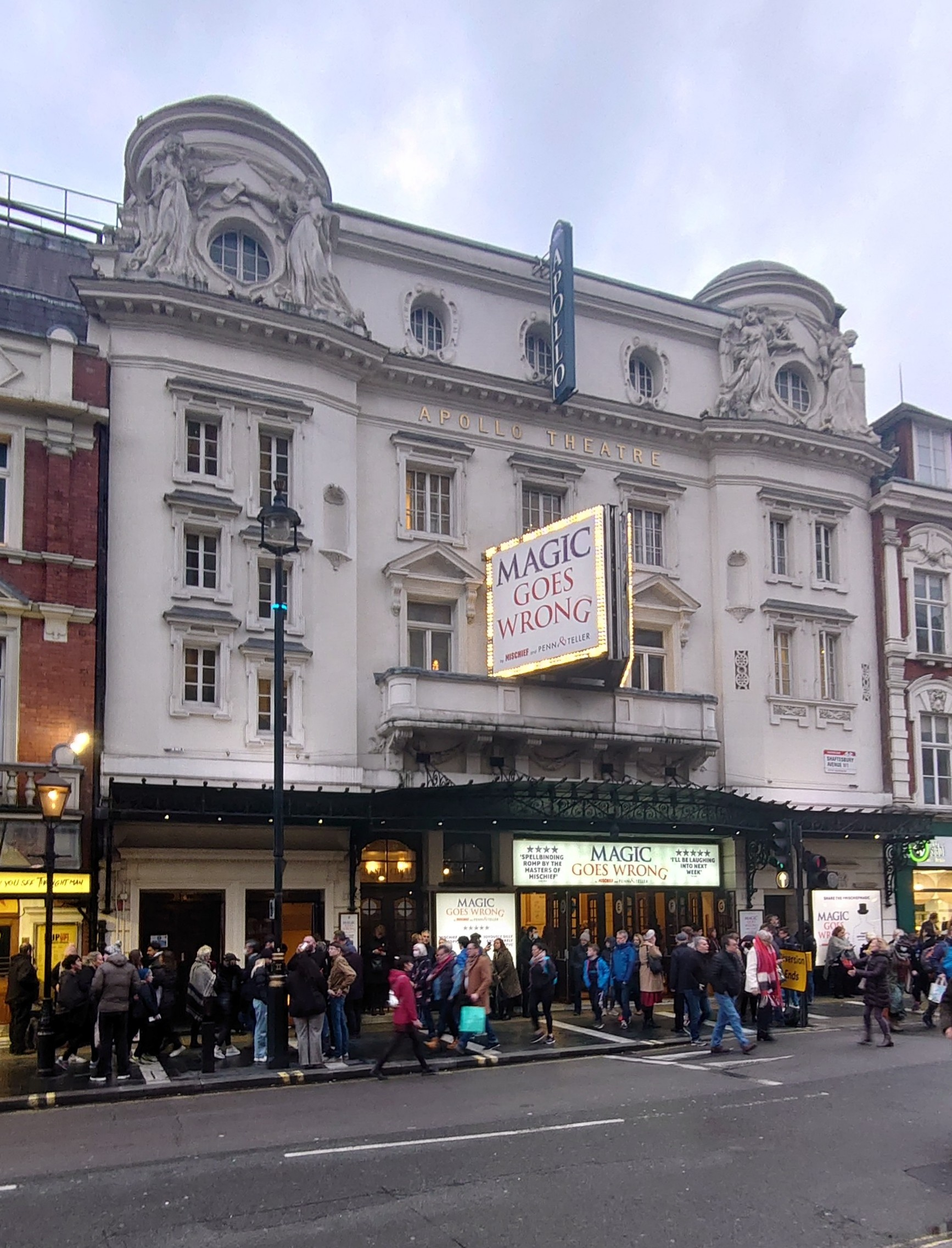
Magic Goes Wrong, Apollo Theatre, February 2022

In 2008, Lewis, Jonathan Sayer, and Henry Shields co-founded Mischief Theatre while they were studying a drama foundation course at the London Academy of Music and Dramatic Art.

In 2012, Lewis co-wrote with Sayer and Shields The Play That Goes Wrong, which premiered later that year at The Old Red Lion, Islington. Lewis played Robert Grove in both the original London cast and the original Broadway cast. In 2013, another Lewis, Sayer and Shields production, Peter Pan Goes Wrong, premiered at The Pleasance Theatre with Lewis amongst its original cast, playing Robert.

In 2016, Lewis', Sayer's, and Shields' play The Comedy About a Bank Robbery opened at the Criterion Theatre; Lewis was amongst its original cast, playing Robin Freeboys. In August 2019, Magic Goes Wrong, a play written by Lewis, Sayer, Shields, and Penn and Teller premiered at the Quays Theatre; Lewis played Mind Mangler and subsequently took him on tour. In September 2019, the next Lewis, Sayer, and Shields play, Groan Ups, premiered at Vaudeville Theatre, as part of a projected year-long residency at the theatre (later curtailed due to COVID-19 restrictions), with Lewis playing Spencer. In 2020, Lewis launched The Mystery Agency, an escape-room style puzzle game, on Kickstarter.

In 2016, a production of Peter Pan Goes Wrong was aired by BBC1, with Lewis playing Robert. The following year, they aired A Christmas Carol Goes Wrong, with Lewis playing Robert. BBC1 aired twelve episodes of The Goes Wrong Show between December 2019 and November 2021. In 2022, he started playing the Riddlemaster in Riddiculous, an ITV daytime game show hosted by Ranvir Singh.

== Television ==
Year	Title	Role	Notes	Ref.
2015	Royal Variety Performance	Robert Grove (The Play that Goes Wrong)	ITV1 (recorded at The Royal Albert Hall)	
2016	Keep it in the Family	Narrator	ITV1 (1 episode)	
2016	Peter Pan Goes Wrong	Robert Grove	BBC1 (Christmas Special, also writer)	
2017	The Tonight Show Starring Jimmy Fallon	Self	NBC (1 episode)	
2017	A Christmas Carol Goes Wrong	Robert Grove	BBC1 (Christmas Special, also writer)	
2018	We Are Most Amused & Amazed	Mind Mangler (Magic Goes Wrong)	ITV1 (Prince Charles' 70th Birthday Celebrations at The London Palladium)	
2019	Royal Variety Performance	Spencer (Groan Ups)	ITV1 (recorded at The London Palladium)	
2019–2021	The Goes Wrong Show	Robert Grove	BBC1 (2 series, 12 episodes, also writer)	
2020	Children in Need	Robert Grove	BBC1	
2021	The Heroic Quest of the Valiant Prince Ivandoe	Yucky Duck, The Golden Father, The Golden Grandfather, Axel the Giant	Cartoon Network (3 episodes)	
2022	Comic Relief	Mind Mangler	BBC1	
2022–present	Riddiculous	Self/Riddlemaster	ITV1 (4 Series, 95 episodes)	
2024	The Completely Made-Up Adventures of Dick Turpin	Baron Von Louth	Apple TV+ (Episode "The Unrobbable Coach")	
2024	Royal Variety Performance	Agent X (The Comedy About Spies)	ITV1 (recorded at The Royal Albert Hall)	
2026	VisionQuest	D.U.M.-E.	Marvel Studios for Disney+	
2027	Father Brown †	TBA	BBC Studios for BBC1	

== Theatre ==
Year	Title	Role	Notes	Ref.
2010	Showstopper! The Improvised Musical	Ensemble	Greenwich Theatre & Arts Depot	
2011	Beasts & Beauties	Ensemble & Understudy	Hampstead Theatre	
2012	Mercury Fur	Party Guest	Old Red Lion Theatre, Islington (also producer)	
2012	Mercury Fur	Party Guest	Trafalgar Studios	
2012	The Play That Goes Wrong	Robert Grove	Old Red Lion Theatre, Islington (also producer and co-writer with Jonathan Sayer and Henry Shields)	
2013	The Play That Goes Wrong	Robert Grove	Trafalgar Studios	
2014	Superior Donuts	-	Southwark Playhouse (as producer)	
2014	The Play That Goes Wrong	Robert Grove	1st UK & International Tour	
2014	The Play That Goes Wrong	Robert Grove	Duchess Theatre, West End	
2015	Peter Pan Goes Wrong	Robert Grove	Apollo Theatre, West End (also co-writer with Jonathan Sayer and Henry Shields)	
2016	The Comedy About a Bank Robbery	Robin Freeboys	Criterion Theatre, West End (also co-writer with Jonathan Sayer and Henry Shields)	
2017	The Play That Goes Wrong	Robert Grove	Lyceum Theater, Broadway	
2017	Mischief Movie Night	Ensemble & Oscar	Arts Theatre, West End (also co-creator)	
2018	Mischief Movie Night	Ensemble & Oscar	1st UK Tour	
2019	Groan Ups	Spencer	Vaudeville Theatre, West End (also co-writer with Jonathan Sayer and Henry Shields)	
2020	Magic Goes Wrong	Mind Mangler	Vaudeville Theatre, West End (also co-writer with Penn and Teller, Jonathan Sayer and Henry Shields)	
2020	Mischief Movie Night	Ensemble & Oscar	UK Tour (Open Air Theatres)	
2020	Mischief Movie Night-In	Ensemble & Oscar	Live Stream (50 episodes) broadcast from Immersive LDN & Riverside Studios	
2021	Magic Goes Wrong	Mind Mangler	Apollo Theatre, West End	
2022	Mind Mangler: Member of the Tragic Circle	Mind Mangler	Pleasance Edinburgh (also co-writer with Jonathan Sayer and Henry Shields)	
2022	Mischief Movie Night	Ensemble	Pleasance Edinburgh	
2022	Starship Improvise	Frank Brass	Pleasance Edinburgh	
2022	Good Luck, Studio	-	UK Tour (as director)	
2022-present	Austentatious	Ensemble	Arts Theatre, West End	
2022-present	Austentatious	Ensemble	Vaudeville Theatre, West End	
2022-present	Austentatious	Ensemble	UK Tours, Edinburgh Festival - Underbelly, McEwan Hall	
2023	Mind Mangler: Member of the Tragic Circle	Mind Mangler	Garrick Theatre & Prince of Wales Theatre, West End	
2023	Mind Mangler: Member of the Tragic Circle	Mind Mangler	1st UK Tour	
2023	Peter Pan Goes Wrong	Robert Grove	Ethel Barrymore Theater, Broadway	
2023	Peter Pan Goes Wrong	Robert Grove	Ahmanson Theater, Los Angeles	
2023	Mind Mangler: A Night of Tragic Illusion	Mind Mangler	New World Stages, Off Broadway, New York City	
2024	Mind Mangler: Member of the Tragic Circle	Mind Mangler	Apollo Theatre, West End	
2024	Mind Mangler: Member of the Tragic Circle	Mind Mangler	2nd UK Tour	
2024	Mischief Movie Night	Ensemble & Oscar	The Other Palace, West End (also producer)	
2024	Mischief Movie Night	Ensemble & Oscar	Live Stream (8 episodes) broadcast from Sadler's Wells	
2025	The Comedy About Spies	Douglas Woodbead	Noël Coward Theatre, West End (also co-writer with Henry Shields)	
2025	Uncle Glen's Menagerie	Improviser	Soho Theatre	
2025	Christmas Carol Goes Wrong	Robert Grove	1st UK Tour	
2025	Christmas Carol Goes Wrong	Robert Grove	Apollo Theatre, West End (also co-writer with Jonathan Sayer and Henry Shields)	
2026	Thespians	-	UK Tour (as executive producer)	
2026	Shoot from the Hip	Guest Improviser	Leicester Square Theatre	
2026	The Comedy About Spies	Douglas Woodbead	Adelphi Theatre, West End	

== Books & playtexts ==
Year	Title	Publisher
2013	The Play that Goes Wrong (One Act Edition)	Methuen
2013	Peter Pan Goes Wrong	Methuen
2013	The Nativity Goes Wrong	Methuen
2014	The Play that Goes Wrong (Two Act Edition)	Methuen
2016	The Comedy About A Bank Robbery	Methuen
2019	Groan Ups	Methuen
2020	The One Act Play that Goes Wrong	Methuen
2023	Mystery Agency: The Museum Heist	Sphere
2024	Mind Mangler: Member of the Tragic Circle	Methuen
2025	The Comedy About Spies	Methuen
2025	Mystery Agency: The Bookshop Murder	Sphere
2025	Christmas Carol Goes Wrong	Methuen
2026	66 Murders	Sphere

== Awards and nominations ==
Year	Award	Category	Work	Result	Ref
2012	Offie	Best Production	Mercury Fur	Nominated	
2014	WhatsOnStage Award	Best New Comedy	The Play That Goes Wrong	Won	
2015	Laurence Olivier Award	Best New Comedy	The Play That Goes Wrong	Won	
2016	Laurence Olivier Award	Best New Comedy	Peter Pan Goes Wrong	Nominated	
2016	Molière Award	Best Comedy	The Play That Goes Wrong	Won	
2017	Laurence Olivier Award	Best New Comedy	The Comedy About a Bank Robbery	Nominated	
2017	Drama League Award	Best Play	The Play That Goes Wrong	Nominated	
2017	Molière Award	Best Comedy	The Comedy About a Bank Robbery	Won	
2017	Broadway.com Audience Choice Award	Favorite New Play	The Play That Goes Wrong	Nominated	
2018	Laurence Olivier Award	Best New Comedy	Mischief Movie Night	Nominated	
2020	TV Choice Awards	Best New Comedy	The Goes Wrong Show	Nominated	
2020	Laurence Olivier Award	Best New Comedy	Magic Goes Wrong	Nominated	
2022	WhatsOnStage Award	Best New Play	Magic Goes Wrong	Nominated	
2022	WhatsOnStage Award	Best Performer in a Male Identifying Role in a Play	Magic Goes Wrong	Nominated	
2022	WhatsOnStage Award	Best West End Show	The Play That Goes Wrong	Nominated	
2022	TV Choice Awards	Best Comedy Performance	The Goes Wrong Show	Nominated	
2023	Outer Critics Circle Awards	Outstanding New Broadway Play	Peter Pan Goes Wrong	Nominated	
2023	Broadway.com Audience Choice Award	Favorite New Play	Peter Pan Goes Wrong	Won	
2023	Drama Desk Award	Unique Theatrical Experience	Peter Pan Goes Wrong	Won	
2023	Drama League Award	Outstanding Production of a Play	Peter Pan Goes Wrong	Nominated	
2024	Off Broadway Alliance Awards	Unique Theatrical Experience	Mind Mangler: A Night of Tragic Illusion	Nominated	
2025	West End Wilma Award	Best New West End Play	The Comedy About Spies	Won	
2025	West End Best Friend	Best New West End Play	The Comedy About Spies	Won	
2026	WhatsOnStage Award	Best New Play	The Comedy About Spies	Won	
2026	Laurence Olivier Award	Best New Comedy or Entertainment	The Comedy About Spies	Nominated	
