= The Comedy about Spies =

British comedy play

The Comedy About Spies
- Original language: English
- Written by: Henry Lewis; Henry Shields
- Genre: Comedy

Premiere
- Date: 14 April 2025
- Place: Noël Coward Theatre
- Directed by: Matt DiCarlo
- Official website

The Comedy About Spies is a play by Henry Lewis and Henry Shields of Mischief Theatre Company. The story follows competing spies from the CIA and KGB as they attempt to recover the plans for a top-secret British weapon. The original production opened in 2025 at the Noël Coward Theatre in London.

== Plot ==
=== Act 1 ===
After the existence of a new top-secret weapon, codenamed Project Midnight, is leaked to the Russians, MI6 prepare to have the plans transferred to a safehouse. However, a bomb explodes and the plans are stolen, with the agents unsuccessfully chasing the rogue agent across London.

KGB Agents Sergei Ivanov and Elena Popova are dispatched to retrieve the files at a handover in the Piccadilly hotel. They masquerade as a married English couple - Tim and Annabel Plank - with Elena becoming frustrated with Sergei's cheerful demeanour, complicated fake backstories, and his attempts to befriend her. CIA Agent Lance Buchanan is also instructed to go there and find the turncoat MI6 agent. His mother, the retired CIA Agent Janet Buchanan, also shows up unannounced to assist him. Also present at the hotel is the struggling actor Douglas Woodbead, who mistakenly believes the Buchanans are Hollywood producers for the new James Bond movies. Banker Rosemary Wilson checks into the hotel for a work conference, and is in turn surprised when her boyfriend, hapless baker Bernard Wright, shows up to join her.

The two pairs of spies attempt to identify the informant and the other spies through a series of manoeuvres. Bernard, meanwhile, prepares to propose to Rosemary, who in turn wants to break up with him and seems to be having an affair with her tennis instructor Marco. The hotel manager, Mr Tipton, attempts to help Bernard and placate the increasingly annoyed guests, as well as preparing for a secret shopper that is staying at their hotel. Sergei and Elena mistakenly believe Bernard is a CIA agent, and repeatedly break into his room impersonating hotel employees. Lance and Janet initially believe the same thing, before then believing Douglas is the informant. The confusion culminates in Sergei, Elena, and Lance bursting into the same room whilst Janet comforts a heartbroken Bernard. The three quickly identify each other as the real spies, and retreat back to their rooms. Lance and Janet, with their covers blown, decide to recruit a fearful Bernard.

=== Act 2 ===
Bernard attempts to learn the real location of the handover from Sergei and Elena, but they deduce that the Buchanans sent him. They in turn send him back with false information, which the Buchanans quickly realise as well. The two sets of spies repeatedly use Bernard as a go-between until he becomes frustrated and flees to find Rosemary.

Sergei and Elena head to the lobby to meet with their informant, whilst Lance and Janet search every spot that Bernard told them. Due to a mishap with the laundry, Douglas is wearing a green jacket that the KGB agents were told to spot, and they make plans to meet him on the roof to handoff the file. Bernard witnesses this and warns the Buchanans, although they do not believe him. At the meeting, Sergei and Elena realise the truth and flee, running into the CIA agents as they do so. The quartet fight through the hotel whilst Bernard poorly attempts to confront Douglas.

Bernard and Douglas run into Rosemary, who is heading to her meeting. She puts on a green jacket, revealing herself to be the informant, and Bernard confronts her. Lance and Janet intercede and try to kill Rosemary, who flees to the lobby. Bernard reaches her first by scaling the lift shaft, and Rosemary reveals she is an MI6 agent and Marco is actually her handler. The KGB and CIA agents all arrive in the lobby, and pursue Rosemary and Bernard.

The chase spills through the streets of London and eventually to the docks along the Thames, where Rosemary meets with Sergei and Elena. Bernard steals the case, but Rosemary convinces him to hand it back, upon which she gives it to the Russians. Lance and Janet arrive, where the former attempts to shoot Sergei, but Elena jumps in front. However, just as they seem to best the KGB duo, Janet reveals herself to be a double agent, who had been sabotaging Lance's career as a spy, and shoots him in the side. Sergei and the wounded Elena escape with the case on a submarine. Mr Tipton arrives, and is revealed to be Marco, who recorded Janet's confession. Rosemary admits to being a triple agent, who only pretended to steal the plans to force a CIA mole - Janet - to reveal themself. Marco then betrays Rosemary and is revealed to be working with Janet, who attempts to shoot Rosemary. However, Bernard had removed the bullets in her gun, allowing Rosemary to disarm and kill Marco. Lance shoots Janet to save them, and sadly walks away. Rosemary states she does love Bernard, but fears they cannot be together due to her work. She decides to resign so they can get married, but Bernard, having enjoyed himself, encourages her to do both. Rosemary then reveals the briefcase actually contains explosives set to go off at midnight.

In the submarine, Sergei and Elena decide to throw the plans for Project Midnight into the river so that neither side can use it. However, when they open the briefcase, they instead find Douglas Woodbead's belongings, as Rosemary accidentally switched their cases earlier. Douglas can then be heard finally arriving at the audition for James Bond before his briefcase explodes.

== Productions ==
=== London (2025) ===
The play premiered at the Noël Coward Theatre in London in 2025. The direction is by Matt DiCarlo. The cast included Henry Shields as Bernard Wright, Dave Hearn as Lance Buchanan, Henry Lewis as Douglas Woodbead, Charlie Russell as Elena Popov, Greg Tannahill as Albert Tipton, and Nancy Zamit as Janet Buchanan. Sets are designed by David Farley, and Costumes are designed by Deborah Andrews.

=== London (2026) ===
On 8 March 2026, it was announced that the play will be revived in the West End at the Adelphi Theatre in London in August 2026.

UK Tour (2027)

On 28 September 2026, it was announced that the play will embark on a UK Tour in 2027.

== Roles and principal casts ==
Character	West End	
Character	2025	2026
Lance Buchanan	Dave Hearn	Dave Hearn
Rosemary Wilson	Adele James	Adele James
Sergei Ivanov	Chris Leask	Chris Leask
Douglas Woodbead	Henry Lewis	Henry Lewis
Elena Popov	Charlie Russell	Bryony Corrigan
Bernard Wright	Henry Shields	Henry Shields
Albert Tipton	Greg Tannahill	Greg Tannahill
Janet Buchanan	Nancy Zamit	Nancy Zamit
Ensemble /Understudies	Adam Byron Allie Dart Ashley Tucker Macadie Amoroso Matt Cavendish Niall Ransom	

== Reception ==
The Comedy About Spies received generally positive reviews. It was nominated for the Olivier Awards 2026. Ryan Gilbey of The Guardian gave it four out of five stars, calling it "delightfully silly show" and stated that "I was crying helpless tears of laughter within the first five minutes." Clive Davis of The Times gave it four out of five stars, stating that though "the cascade of gags and puns does begin to flag slightly in the final quarter... this is just the kind of outrageously inventive humour that the world needs at the moment".
