= The Goes Wrong Show =

British comedy television series (2019–2021)

- Genre: Comedy
- Created by: Henry Lewis; Jonathan Sayer; Henry Shields
- Written by: Henry Lewis; Jonathan Sayer; Henry Shields
- Directed by: Martin Dennis
- Starring: Henry Shields; Henry Lewis; Jonathan Sayer; Dave Hearn; Charlie Russell; Bryony Corrigan; Nancy Zamit; Chris Leask; Greg Tannahill
- Country of origin: United Kingdom
- Original language: English
- No. of series: 2
- No. of episodes: 12

Production
- Executive producers: Hilary Strong, Kenton Allen, Kenny Wax, Saurabh Kakkar, Matthew Justice
- Producer: Jim Poyser
- Production location: dock10 studios
- Editor: Mark Lawrence
- Running time: 30 minutes
- Production companies: Mischief Screen; BigTalk Productions; Lionsgate UK

Original release
- Network: BBC One
- Release: 23 December 2019 – 1 November 2021

The Goes Wrong Show is a British comedy television series created by Henry Lewis, Jonathan Sayer and Henry Shields, and produced by Mischief Screen and Big Talk Productions, in association with Lionsgate UK, for the BBC. The programme stars the ensemble members of the Mischief Theatre company, who reprise their roles as the members of the fictitious theatre company, "Cornley Polytechnic Drama Society", as they conduct a series of "live" televised stage plays, which constantly go wrong due to mistakes, accidents and other issues that hamper the company's efforts. The concept was devised by Lewis, Sayer and Shields following two television Christmas specials for the BBC, with the series premiering on BBC One on 23 December 2019. In 2020, the group conducted a second series, but under strict guidelines due to the COVID-19 pandemic in the United Kingdom, which aired on 27 September 2021.

It was confirmed by the BBC on 26 March 2024 that the series would not be renewed.

== Premise ==
The plot for each episode of the programme focuses on the Cornley Polytechnic Drama Society having the opportunity to conduct a play on live television before a live studio audience. As with the stage performances conducted by Mischief Theatre as the fictional theatre company, all productions and events done by the Cornley group tend to go wrong due to issues with props and stage pieces, mistakes with lines, and problematic accidents; in some cases, the play goes wrong from the start due to a mistake setting it up.

== Cast ==
- Henry Shields as Chris Bean – the company's pedantic, long-suffering director, who struggles to keep the play running smoothly.
- Henry Lewis as Robert Grove – an actor who believes acting is all about presence and volume. He constantly feuds with Chris over the lead role of performances, often inflating the importance of bit parts or inventing superfluous characters. In "Summer Once Again", he served briefly as director.
- Jonathan Sayer as Dennis Tyde – an actor entrusted with small roles, including animals and inanimate objects, due to his inability to remember lines and his misinterpretation of stage directions and instructions.
- Dave Hearn as Max Bennett – an actor whose “aunt runs the BBC”. His acting talent varies from play to play, but he is generally not a very good actor, and tends to be a ham when making an entrance or performing a stunt.
- Charlie Russell as Sandra Wilkinson – an actress who tends to overact when performing and keenly seeks to appear attractive and impress her audience.
- Bryony Corrigan as Vanessa Wilcock-Wynn-Carroway – an actress who tends to suffer frequent accidents during performance and cannot cope with improvisation. Corrigan previously appeared in two earlier specials of the show; Peter Pan Goes Wrong as one of the stage team, and in A Christmas Carol Goes Wrong as a receptionist.
- Nancy Zamit as Annie Twilloil – a solid supporting member of the company, initially an assistant stage manager forced to perform against her will, who is often assigned to play old women or men.
- Chris Leask as Trevor Watson – the company's stage manager responsible for the scenery and props, who does his best to avoid being seen by the audience when fixing mistakes; although he is occasionally roped in as a supporting character when required.
- Greg Tannahill as Jonathan Harris – an actor who struggles to be noticed when performing, due to either being unable to open the doors on a set and thus sometimes getting trapped, or having his scenes messed up by mishaps and accidents.
- Ellie Morris as Lucy Grove – an actress who suffers from stage fright, anxiety and distress, mostly due to her uncle Robert's harsh training of her acting skills.

== Production ==
=== Background ===
In 2016, Mischief Theatre was offered the opportunity by the BBC to produce a televised adaptation of Peter Pan Goes Wrong, which aired in December 2016. The following year, the broadcaster invited the company back to produce a new special, titled A Christmas Carol Goes Wrong, in December 2017. Both specials proved a success with viewers, leading Mischief Theatre to be commissioned for a television series for BBC One. The company's directors, Shields and Sayer, opted to using the same writers and cast for the series, and devised the series as The Goes Wrong Show, focused on the fictional theatre company the cast performed as being involved in conducting different stage performances. The six episodes were each given different themes for their play, including a period romance and a spy thriller, and led to the production of six half-hour episodes. A second series was later commissioned, beginning with a Christmas special in 2020, followed by five episodes in 2021.

=== Development ===
The Goes Wrong Show was announced by the BBC on 22 February 2019. The show was commissioned by BBC's controller of comedy commissioning, Shane Allen, and Charlotte Moore, director of BBC content. Following the success of the first series, the BBC commissioned a second series, which premiered on 22 December 2020. The first half-hour episode was a re-telling of the Nativity story. In addition to the writers, the show also stars regular Mischief performers including Charlie Russell, Bryony Corrigan, Dave Hearn and Nancy Zamit. In one of the episodes, the cast are filmed upside down. The first series was recorded in the dock10 studios in Salford, Greater Manchester.

== Episodes ==
Series	Episodes	Originally released	
Series	Episodes	First released	Last released
1	6	23 December 2019	31 January 2020
S	1	22 December 2020	
2	5	27 September 2021	1 November 2021

=== Series 1 (2019–2020) ===
No. overall	No. in series	Title	Directed by	Original release date	U.K. viewers (millions)
1	1	"The Spirit of Christmas"	Martin Dennis	23 December 2019	<(3.71)
The Cornley Polytechnic Drama Society is invited to stage televised plays for the BBC. In their first offering, the group present a Christmas story, in which Santa Claus and his elves attempt to bring happiness to a sad little girl on Christmas Eve. Unfortunately, Robert, playing Santa, gets drunk during the performance, while Chris, playing as a magic snowman, gets his costume entangled with a malfunctioning stage prop.
2	2	"The Pilot (Not The Pilot)"	Martin Dennis	3 January 2020	<(4.00)
The Cornley actors present a World War II drama, in which the plot focuses on an Allied code-breaking team who happen to discover that there is a German spy amongst their members. Things go wrong from the start, as the play is poorly researched, Annie has to assume the role of a key actor who fails to show up, and Robert ends up getting more screen time as Hitler than was planned.
3	3	"A Trial to Watch"	Martin Dennis	10 January 2020	<(4.09)
The drama society present a legal drama, in which two opposing lawyers, a former husband and wife, tackle a case concerning an ex-cop accused of murder. Unfortunately, Dennis is cast in the starring role and struggles with his lines as a result. Worse, a design error leads to some set pieces being the wrong size, while several split-set pieces get mishmashed with each other by mistake.
4	4	"The Lodge"	Martin Dennis	17 January 2020	<(4.13)
The Cornley actors stage a 1960s horror piece, in which the plot focuses on a young family who become trapped in the house of a widower who seeks to bring his wife back from the dead via black magic. Unfortunately, Chris instructs the others to pad out their performances with a gratuitous amount of adjectives to ensure the play doesn't end too soon, but it's not easy when Dennis, playing a haunted trophy head, keeps delivering his lines at the wrong moment.
5	5	"Harper's Locket"	Martin Dennis	24 January 2020	<(4.00)
The drama society stage a period romance drama, in which Sandra takes the lead role of a young woman who wishes to marry a stable hand rather than a cruel aristocrat. But problems arise, as the set causes problems for Jonathan, Trevor knocks himself out fixing a leaky roof above the cast, Chris has some problematic gun-shot effects, and there's an accident with a cat and a piano.
6	6	"90 Degrees"	Martin Dennis	31 January 2020	<(3.96)
The Cornley actors perform a Deep South drama, with the plot focusing on the family of a dying iced tea mogul contending over their inheritance. However, the set builders misunderstood the play's title, leaving the cast to cope with performing their scenes on one set that's at 90 degrees on its side, and another that's upside down.

=== Christmas Special (2020) ===
No. overall	No. in series	Title	Directed by	Original release date	U.K. viewers (millions)
7	1	"The Nativity"	Martin Dennis	22 December 2020	<(4.10)
The drama society stage a Nativity play, but because it's being sponsored by a corporate finance company, they have to include some rather tasteless advertisements into their dialogue. To make things worse, the performance is constantly interrupted by repeated fire drills, several special effects malfunctions, and the specially designed set-pieces, which trip up everyone.

=== Series 2 (2021) ===
No. overall	No. in series	Title	Directed by	Original release date	U.K. viewers (millions)
8	1	"Summer Once Again"	Martin Dennis	27 September 2021	<(2.99)
Following the disastrous Nativity play, Robert takes over as the drama society's director, and stages an epic period drama set after World War I, regarding the return of a war hero to his family. Unfortunately, Robert's insistence they not make mistakes leads him to redoing the opening scene several times to undo them, which only makes things worse.
9	2	"The Most Lamentable... (Note: Short for "The Most Lamentable Tragedy of the Prince of England and His Long Lost Twin Brother, Prince Regent of France and the Problems Therein Experienced by All When they came to Know of One Another after a Battle")"	Martin Dennis	4 October 2021 (Note: This episode was first released online on 27 September 2021.)	<(3.06)
Chris resumes his duties as director, and leads the actors in performing a Renaissance drama concerning a prince who seeks to disinherit his long-lost twin brother by framing him for the murder of their father. Unfortunately, Robert tries to upstage the others after being given a non-speaking role, while Jonathan labours with a heavy suit of armour that causes its fair share of trouble.
10	3	"There Is No Escape"	Martin Dennis	11 October 2021	<(2.98)
The drama society present an American prison drama, concerning a prisoner who arranges a breakout with other convicts, all while seeking to prove his innocence in his wife's murder. Unfortunately, technical problems cause issues with some pre-recorded narration, Annie struggles with her body costume, and various set pieces malfunction when being lowered onto the stage.
11	4	"The Cornley Drama Festival Part 1"	Martin Dennis	25 October 2021	<(3.11)
To prevent another coup, Chris allows the various Cornley members to put on their own performances as part of a drama festival. Robert conducts an egotistical acting masterclass, Max performs a "kitchen sink" drama, and Vanessa presents an improvisational comedy show. To end the show, Chris stages a pretentious ballet about a caterpillar.
12	5	"The Cornley Drama Festival Part 2"	Martin Dennis	1 November 2021	<(3.16)
The Cornley drama festival continues. Sandra stages an audio play, but has issues with Trevor and his sound effects, while Dennis presents a short and uninteresting play of his own. When Annie stages a bawdy 1970s farce comedy with heavy censoring, things go horribly wrong, leaving Jonathan to perform an ensemble musical piece; but Jonathan finds out that doing a musical number that’s supposed to have an ensemble cast on one's own is very hard.

== Reception ==
The first series received generally positive reviews. Radio Times' Huw Fullerton said that "The Goes Wrong Show ... is actually the laugh-out-loud new project from the Mischief Theatre company". Tim Dowling from The Guardian praised the show's farce and the amount of behind-the-scenes effort that went into making it work. Ian D. Hall of Liverpool Sound and Vision named A Trial To Watch "one of the finest examples of farce to made it to television [sic] in years". Another positive review for the opening episode came from Michael Hogan's review in The Telegraph. He said "This old-fashioned, family-friendly comedy trod the line between seasonal cheer and black humour with aplomb. It was like Mrs. Brown's Boys but funny."

When reviewing the Christmas episode, Steve Bennett from Chortle said "while every mistake here is, of course, meticulously planned, they are pulled off with enough flair, commitment and occasional ingenuity to break all but the most cynical of viewers to laughter." The show received a five-star review from Suzi Feay of the Financial Times, who said, "This stuff has to be directed and performed with pinpoint accuracy if it’s to succeed. Fortunately, it’s perfectly, deliberately, terrible.” In a negative review, Lottie Young of the Evening Standard called the first episode "embarrassingly bad" and argued that "the formula of slapstick comedy is more fossilised than old-fashioned." Rupert Hawksley from i News said that "theatre does not always translate well to television" and noted the script as being "dreadful".

== Watch-along ==
On 3 April 2020, during the COVID-19 pandemic, Mischief Theatre began a watch-along of the episodes of the show on Twitter (with the hashtag #GoesWrongAlong), beginning with "90 Degrees". The watchalongs started at 7pm.

No.	Title	Release date
1	90 Degrees	3 April 2020
2	Harper's Locket	10 April 2020
3	The Pilot (Not The Pilot)	17 April 2020
4	The Spirit of Christmas	24 April 2020
5	The Lodge	1 May 2020
6	A Trial To Watch	8 May 2020
7	The Most Lamentable...	2 June 2022

== DVD release ==
The first series was released on DVD by Lionsgate Home Entertainment UK on 10 February 2020. DVDs of the two specials, Peter Pan Goes Wrong and A Christmas Carol Goes Wrong, were released on 29 March 2021 and series two was made available, all again through Lionsgate Home Entertainment, from 20 December 2021.
