= Jonathan Sayer =

English playwright and sketch comedian, part of Mischief Theatre

- Born: Jonathan David Burke; 8 September 1988 (age 38); Ashton-under-Lyne, England
- Education: London Academy of Music and Dramatic Art
- Occupation: Actor
- Years active: 2008–present

Jonathan Sayer (born Jonathan David Burke; 8 September 1988) is a British actor and playwright. He co-founded Mischief Theatre, responsible for The Play That Goes Wrong, Peter Pan Goes Wrong, The Comedy About a Bank Robbery, Groan Ups, Magic Goes Wrong and The Goes Wrong Show. Sayer also stars as U. in Marvel Studios' VisionQuest.

== Career ==
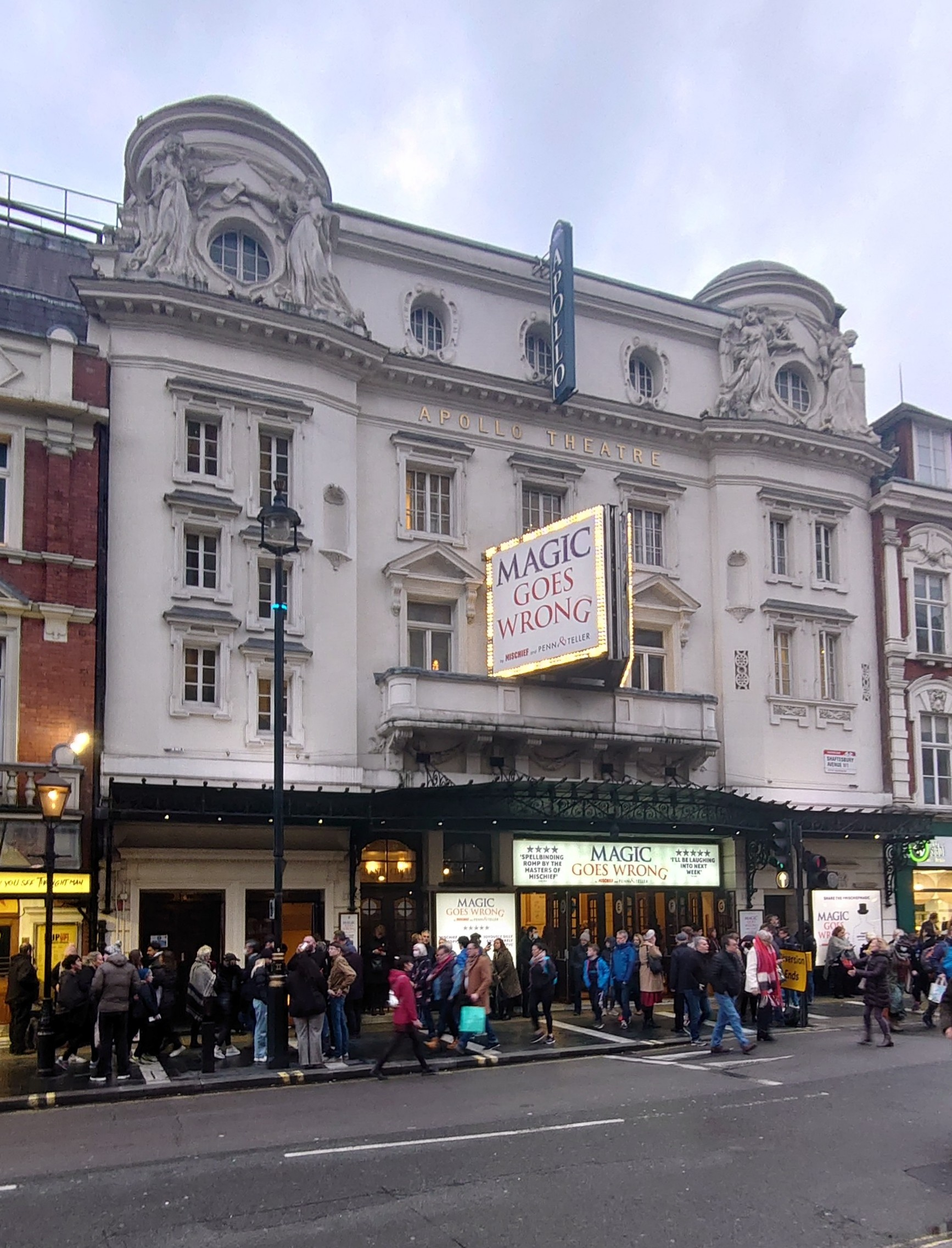
Magic Goes Wrong, Apollo Theatre, February 2022

In 2008, Sayer, Henry Lewis, and Henry Shields co-founded Mischief Theatre while they were studying a drama foundation course at the London Academy of Music and Dramatic Art.

In 2012, Sayer co-wrote with Lewis and Shields The Play That Goes Wrong, which premiered later that year at The Old Red Lion, Islington. Sayer played Dennis Tyde in both the original London cast and the original Broadway cast. In 2013, another Lewis, Sayer and Shields production, Peter Pan Goes Wrong, premiered at The Pleasance Theatre, with Sayer amongst its original cast, playing Dennis.

In 2016, Lewis's, Sayer's, and Shields's play The Comedy About a Bank Robbery opened at the Criterion Theatre; Sayer was amongst its original cast, and played Warren Slax. In August 2019, Magic Goes Wrong, a play written by Lewis, Sayer, Shields, and Penn and Teller, premiered at the Quays Theatre; Sayer played Mikey and subsequently took him on tour. In September 2019, the next Lewis, Sayer and Shields play, Groan Ups, premiered at Vaudeville Theatre, as part of a projected year-long residency at the theatre (later curtailed due to COVID-19 restrictions), with Sayer playing Simon.

In 2016, a production of Peter Pan Goes Wrong was aired by BBC1, with Sayer playing Dennis. The following year, they aired A Christmas Carol Goes Wrong, with Sayer playing Dennis. BBC1 aired twelve episodes of The Goes Wrong Show between December 2019 and November 2021.

== Awards and nominations ==
Year	Award	Category	Work	Result
2014	WhatsOnStage Award	Best New Comedy	The Play That Goes Wrong	Won
2015	Laurence Olivier Award	Best New Comedy	The Play That Goes Wrong	Won
2016	Laurence Olivier Award	Best New Comedy	Peter Pan Goes Wrong	Nominated
2017	Laurence Olivier Award	Best New Comedy	The Comedy About a Bank Robbery	Nominated
2017	Drama League Award	Best Play	The Play That Goes Wrong	Nominated
2020	Laurence Olivier Award	Best New Comedy	Magic Goes Wrong	Nominated
