= St Thomas More Roman Catholic Academy, North Shields =

Secondary school in Tyne and Wear, England

Coordinates: 55.018°N 1.477°W

St Thomas More Catholic High School

Location
- Lynn Road; North Shields, Tyne and Wear, NE29 8LF; England

Information
- Type: High School (English school)High School
- Religious affiliation: Roman Catholic
- Established: 1988
- Local authority: North Tyneside
- Department for Education URN: 137734 Tables
- Ofsted: Reports
- Chair of Governors: Michael Ronan
- Headteacher: David Watson
- Gender: Coeducational
- Age: 11 to 18
- Enrolment: c.1700
- Colours: Maroon and Gold
- Website: http://www.stmschool.org.uk

St Thomas More RC Academy is a coeducational Roman Catholic secondary school and sixth form located on Lynn Road (B1316) in North Shields, North Tyneside, England.

== History ==
The school, which was known as St Anselm's before 1988, is a specialist maths and computing school and has been a DFES Training School since September 2000.

The headteacher John Marshall left in 2007, and was replaced by Diane Donkin. In 2016, David Watson became the headteacher.

The school's name changed from St Thomas More High School to St Thomas More Academy in 2012, and to St Thomas More RC High School in 2021.

== Notable alumni ==
- Adam Campbell professional footballer
- Bryony Corrigan, actress
- Ross Murray., Olympic 400m runner
- Brad Inman professional footballer.

== Inspections ==
In 2023, Ofsted inspected the school and judged it Good.
