= Riddiculous =

British game show

- Genre: Game show
- Presented by: Ranvir Singh
- Starring: Henry Lewis
- Theme music composer: Paul Farrer
- Country of origin: United Kingdom
- Original language: English
- No. of series: 3
- No. of episodes: 70

Production
- Executive producers: Nathan Eastwood; Michelle Langer
- Production location: Dock10 studios
- Running time: 60 minutes (inc. adverts)
- Production company: East Media

Original release
- Network: ITV
- Release: 24 October 2022 – present

Riddiculous (stylised as R¿DD?CULOUS) is a British game show that has aired on ITV since 24 October 2022 and is hosted by Ranvir Singh with Henry Lewis starring as "The Riddlemaster". The show features contestants answering general knowledge questions before facing riddles from Henry Lewis.

== Gameplay ==
Three teams of two start by answering general knowledge questions, whereby they have to be the first to press their buzzer and state the answer. After three correct answers, they have to solve a riddle.

=== Round 1 ===
Questions are worth £50 (£25 since Series 2). If the riddle is answered correctly, it is worth £100. After four riddles, the lowest-scoring team is eliminated. If there is a tie for the lowest-scoring team, a further question is asked with a numerical answer. The team who is furthest away from the actual answer is eliminated.

=== Round 2 ===
Questions are worth £100 (£50 since Series 2) and riddles are worth £250 (£200 since Series 2). This time, the teams may pick among three visual multiple choice riddles from a description, such as animals, letters or numbers; however, only one of the pair can answer the riddle. They have 60 seconds to answer the riddle. If the riddle is answered incorrectly, the opposing pair may answer it for £125 (£100 since Series 2).

=== Round 3 ===
Questions are worth £150 (£100 since Series 2) and riddles are worth £500 and thrown-over riddles are worth £250 (£300 and £150 respectively since Series 2). After three riddles have been posed, the highest-scoring pair progresses to the Final.

=== Final ===
The winning team faces Henry's Riddle Run, where they have one minute to solve six rebus riddles to win their bank; should they do so, they may take on one further double-or-nothing rebus riddle, for which they have 20 seconds. However, if they fail to solve this riddle within the time limit, they lose all of their money and instead take home a Riddiculous themed teacup and saucer as a consolation prize.

== Background and release ==
Riddiculous was first announced in September 2021 for a 20-episode run with Ranvir Singh as host and Henry Lewis as the Riddlemaster. Filming of Series 1 took place in May 2022 and premiered in October 2022 in the 3pm slot replacing Tenable. In August 2023, Series 2 was filmed and eventually debuted on 1 January 2024 with a 25-episode run in the 3pm slot ordered to replace repeats of Lingo. Series 3 was announced in July 2024, along with plans to film another 25 episodes in September. These eventually debuted on 9 February 2026.

== Transmissions ==
Series	Start date	End date	Episodes
1	24 October 2022	18 November 2022	20
2	1 January 2024	2 February 2024	25
3	13 June 2025		25
3	9 February 2026	18 March 2026	25

== International versions ==
The format rights to the show are held by Sony Pictures Television.

Country	Title	Host	Riddlemaster	Network	Broadcast
United States	Riddiculous	TBA	TBA	GSN	TBA
