= The Comedy About a Bank Robbery =

2016 British comedy play

- West End production poster
- Original language: English
- Written by: Henry Lewis; Jonathan Sayer; Henry Shields
- Characters: Mitch Ruscitti; Mr. Robin Freeboys; Warren Slax; Ruth Monaghan; Sam Monaghan; Caprice Freeboys; Neil Cooper; Officer Randall Shuck; Everyone Else
- Genre: Comedy
- Setting: 1958, Minneapolis

Premiere
- Date: 21 April 2016
- Place: Criterion Theatre

The Comedy About a Bank Robbery is a comedy play written by Henry Lewis, Jonathan Sayer and Henry Shields of Mischief Theatre.

The play premiered at the Criterion Theatre in London's West End on 31 March 2016, with an official opening night on 21 April 2016, marking the third production by Mischief Theatre to open in the West End following The Play That Goes Wrong and Peter Pan Goes Wrong (with all three running simultaneously during the Christmas 2016 season).

== Production history ==
=== West End (2016-20) ===
On 3 December 2015, it was announced the play would begin previews at the West End's Criterion Theatre on 31 March 2016, with its official opening night on 21 April 2016. The play is directed by Mark Bell, with design by David Farley and costume design by Roberto Surace. The play received nomination for Best New Comedy at the 2017 Olivier Awards. The production was scheduled to close in May 2020, however due to the COVID-19 crisis it played its final performance on 15 March 2020.

=== UK tour (2018-19) ===
Following the West End production, the play began a UK tour from August 2018 at the Birmingham Repertory Theatre, touring until May 2019.

=== International productions ===
A Polish adaptation titled Komedia o napadzie na bank opened at Teatr Komedia in Warsaw on 7 May 2017. The adaptation was translated by Elżbieta Woźniak and directed by Tomasz Dutkiewicz. It was the first non-UK adaptation of the play.

A French adaptation of the play titled Le Gros Diamant du Prince Ludwig (translated as The Big Diamond of Prince Ludwig) opened at Theatre du Gymnase in Paris from 15 June to 31 August 2017. The adaptation was translated by Miren Pradier and Gwen Aduh (who also directed) and won the Molière Award for Best Comedy 2018. The play also opened at the Théâtre Le Palace in Paris from 19 July 2018.

A Russian adaptation of the play titled Комедия о том, как банк грабили (translated directly from the English title) opened at MDM Theatre in Moscow on 5 October 2019. The adaptation was translated by Alexandra Kozyreva. It is the first non-English production of the play to use the same set and staging as the West End production.

A Dutch adaptation of the play titled De Komedie Over een Bankoverval (translated directly from the English title) opened in September 2023. The company PretPakhuis presented by arrangement with Mischief Worldwide Ltd. the Mischief Production. The adaptation was translated by Jon van Eerd. This production concluded on March 3, 2024.

A Swiss Adaption of the play titled "Komöde mit Banküberfall" opened in March 2021 at the Hechtplatz Theatre in Zürich. It was also played in Germany Hamburg at the St.Pauli Theatre in 2021. In 2023 it was played once more at the Hechtplatz Theatre. The play was presented by the Shake Company, directed by Dominik Flaschka. In 2025, the first Austrian production with the same translation by Maria Harpner und Anatol Preissler premiered at the Volkstheater, Vienna. Performances are currently scheduled through April 2026.

A Hebrew adaptation of the play titled "הקומדיה על שוד הבנק" premiered in November 2023 and opened in April 2024 at the Cameri Theatre in Tel Aviv. The play was translated and adapted by Dori Parnas and directed by Amir I. Wolf, with set design by Neta Haker and costume design by Shira Wise. The cast for this production includes Alon Sandler in the role of Mitch, Yaniv Swisa as Cooper, Nadav Assulin as Officer Shak and Ohad Shachar in the role of Mr. Freeboys (Translated as Jo-Dad Kabaish).

The production closed on February 25, 2025. In its final performances, due to a vocal injury sustained by Alon, the role of Mitch was played by actor Tom Avni.

== Plot ==
=== Act I ===
The year is 1958. Convict Mitch Ruscitti, currently imprisoned at the British Columbia Penitentiary, hatches an escape plan with Neil Cooper, one of the guards, with the intent of traveling to Minneapolis to steal a diamond worth half a million dollars. Unfortunately, due to Cooper's big mouth, word gets out about the plan, and the whole prison wants to join the heist. Mitch and Cooper are able to escape, however, and they drive down to the Twin Cities to find the diamond.

Meanwhile, at the Minneapolis City Bank, manager Robin Freeboys oversees preparations to ensure the bank is secure enough to store the diamond in question, owned by Prince Ludwig of Hungary. This proves tough, as the bank is victim to more crimes than any other bank in the state (in fact, Mr. Freeboys' car and furniture are stolen by robbers who were mistaken as bank staff). Luckily, Ruth Monaghan, a teller at the bank (who always says "everyone in this town's a crook"), persuades bureau officer Randall Shuck to allow the bank to store the diamond, much to his superiors' anger.

Over the next few days, Caprice Freeboys, Mr. Freeboys' daughter and Mitch's ex, starts dating Sam Monaghan, Ruth's son and a pickpocket, in the hopes of sweet-talking some money out of him (the money she currently gets from her father and other three suitors will barely cover her rent). While at her apartment, however, Mitch and Cooper arrive with the tools needed to pull off the bank heist (including ventilation blueprints and an electric drill), along with the codes for the diamond case. The two crooks rope Sam and Caprice into joining them, mainly because the former can pose as Mr. Freeboys, and the latter as Prince Ludwig's attaché. Before they leave for the night, however, Mitch privately tells Caprice that he's not cutting Sam in, noting "as soon as we got the diamond, Sam's dead."

=== Act II ===
The next several days pass with the bank finishing preparations, Ruth and Randall dating, the heist team going over their plan, and Sam asking Ruth for relationship advice. On the night of the heist, things don't go according to plan (Cooper initially sedates Sam instead of Mr. Freeboys, for one), but the team is able to shut down the AC and access the air ducts. As they crawl past the back office, they're forced to knock out and bring along intern Warren Slax as he attempts to check the vents.

Eventually, Mitch and Cooper get separated from the rest of the team, and find themselves directly over the vault. Unfortunately, the vent below Cooper buckles, and Mitch, having no further use for Cooper, shoves him into the still-running fan below, killing him. Once Sam and Caprice arrive, Mitch convinces them that he tried to save Cooper, and they continue with the heist.

Once inside the vault, the team is able to access the casing containing the diamond, but Mr. Freeboys (who was planning on stealing the diamond himself to cause a stir in the newspapers) walks in on them, forcing Mitch to shoot him and Prince Ludwig (who was hoping to resolve the situation). With the diamond in hand, Mitch tells Caprice to shoot Sam, but she refuses out of love for Sam; Mitch responds by shooting Caprice, but Sam dives in front of her and takes the bullet in his shoulder. Before Mitch can kill either of them, however, Warren falls out of the vent and lands on Mitch, allowing Sam and Caprice to escape.

The two of them make it to Caprice's apartment, where she attempts to patch up Sam's shoulder. Before she can get started, though, Mitch catches up to them and attempts to shoot Caprice, but Randall shoots him first. At Ruth's persuasion, he misdirects the police, patches up Sam's wound, and gives him and Caprice his car to cross over into Ontario and lie low (it's a good thing Caprice knows someone there). Once they leave, Ruth takes the diamond from the dead Mitch, handcuffs Randall to Caprice's bed, and spills a trail of liquor onto the ground. She then warns Randall to be careful who he trusts, before holding up a lighter and giving one last remark: "It's like I always say; everyone in this town's a crook."

(This ending was changed about a month into the run of the show as it was seen as quite a dark ending to a funny show. Ruth takes the diamond from the dead Mitch and handcuffs Randall to Caprice's bed. She then warns Randall to be careful who he trusts, giving one last remark: "It's like I always say; everyone in this town's a crook." She leaves and does not set fire to the apartment.)

== Principal roles and original cast ==
Character	West End	UK tour
Character	2016	2018
Mitch Ruscitti	Henry Shields	Liam Jeavons
Mr. Robin Freeboys	Henry Lewis	Damian Lynch
Warren Slax	Jonathan Sayer	Jon Trenchard
Ruth Monaghan	Nancy Zamit	Ashley Tucker
Sam Monaghan	Dave Hearn	Seán Carey
Caprice Freeboys	Charlie Russell	Julia Frith
Neil Cooper	Greg Tannahill	David Coomber
Officer Randall Shuck	Jeremy Lloyd	Killian Macardle
Everyone Else	Chris Leask	George Hannigan

== Reviews ==
The show received five star reviews from many leading critics including The Telegraph, The Times, Radio Times, Sunday Telegraph and WhatsOnStage. Dominic Cavendish from The Telegraph said "Quite simply, this is the funniest show in the West End", "You keep thinking this is as good as it gets - then it gets better". The Times declared the production "Fast and fabulous comedy caper is a joyful night out."
