= Old Red Lion, Islington =

Pub theatre in Islington, north London

- ORL; Old Red; Old Red Lion Theatre
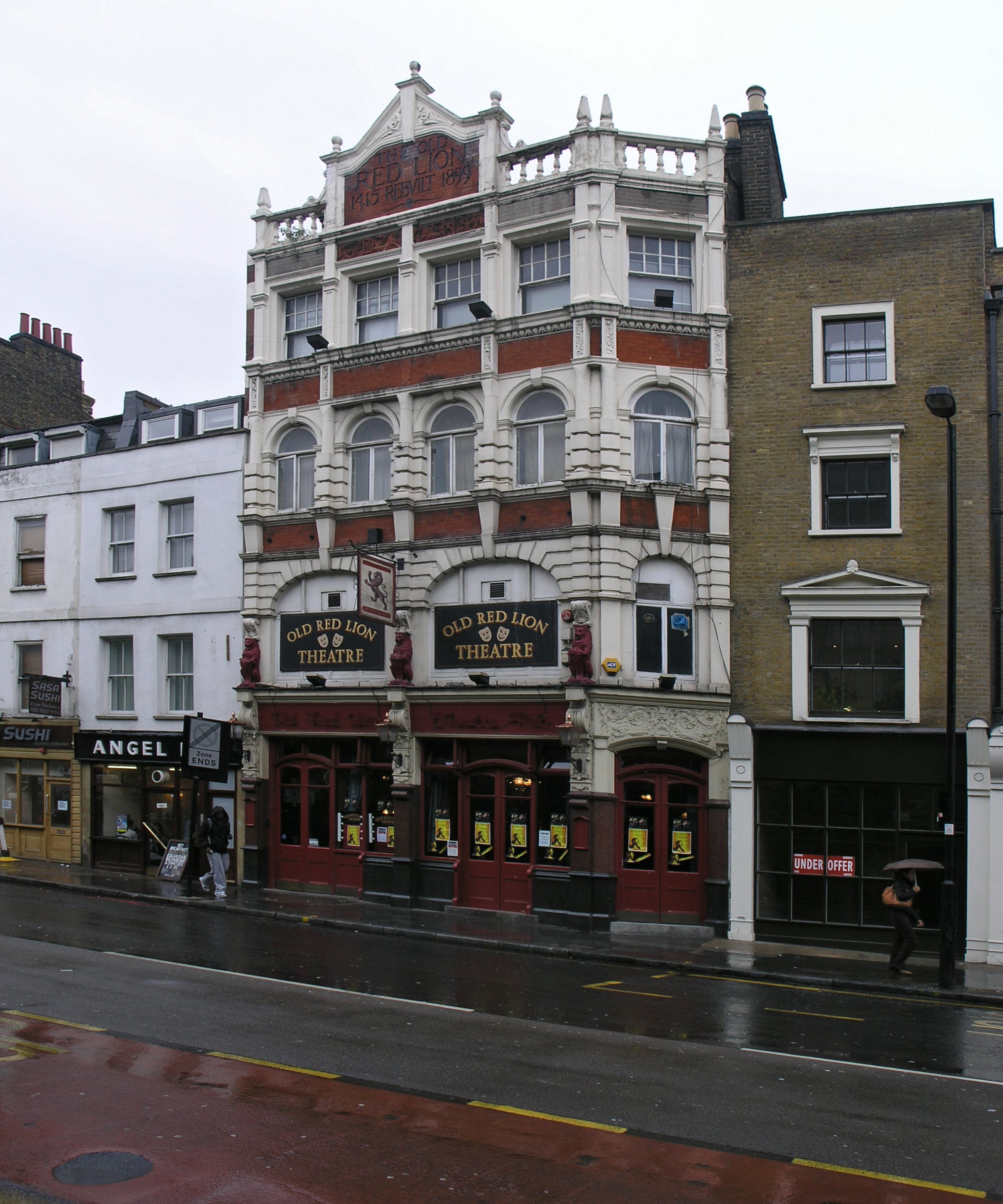
- The Old Red Lion Pub and Theatre, 2007
- Interactive map of Old Red Lion, Islington
- Address: St. John Street; London, EC1; England
- Coordinates: 51.5314°N 0.1062°W
- Capacity: 60
- Type: Fringe theatre
- Production: Country Life
- Public transit: Angel

Construction
- Opened: 1979; 47 years ago
- Years active: 32

Website
- oldredliontheatre.co.uk

The Old Red Lion (ORL), also known as the Old Red Lion Theatre (ORLT) and The Old Red, is a pub and fringe theatre, at Angel, in the London Borough of Islington.

The theatre was founded in 1979 as the Old Red Lion Theatre Club. The pub was Grade II listed in 1994 by Historic England.

== History ==
=== Previous buildings ===
The pub in itself is one of the oldest in London, having first been built in 1415 in what was then the rural village of Islington in open countryside and fields. A house called Goose Farm and some nearby cattle pens (for herds being driven to Smithfield Market) were the only structures to adjoin it, and St John Street (then called Chester Road) was a country lane.

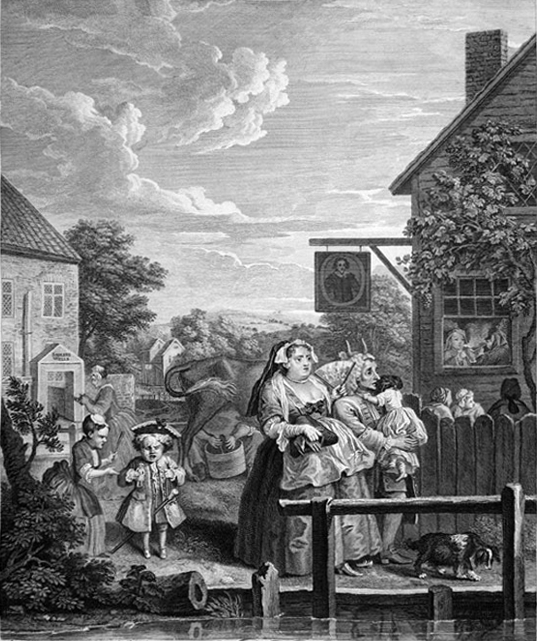
"Evening" by Hogarth, featuring the old pub building in the background

In the late 18th century Chester Road became notorious for highwaymen, with patrols being provided to protect those travelling along it at night. At this time descriptions state that the Old Red Lion was a small brick house with three trees in its forecourt, visited by William Hogarth (who portrayed it in the middle distance of his painting "Evening", with the foreground being Sadler's Wells), Samuel Johnson and Thomas Paine (who wrote The Rights of Man in the shade of the trees in its forecourt).

=== Reconstruction (1899) ===
The Old Red Lion was rebuilt in 1899, designed by Eedle and Myers for Charles Dickerson and John William North, adding two exits onto different streets. This gave the pub the nickname "the In and Out", since taxi passengers could avoid paying their fare by entering it through one door and disappearing through the other.

The architectural style is Free-Classical style, but includes Neo-Jacobean and Renaissance elements. The building is four storeys high, with residential accommodation in the floors above the pub. The parapet is balustraded with a name panel inscribed with lettering in Arts and Crafts style: "THE OLD RED LION 1415 REBVILT 1899".

The pub retains several identical pairs of original glazed doors with glazing, wrought iron wall lanterns on pillars, and much of its original interior.

=== Theatre (1979) ===
In 1979 the pub became a family-run pub theatre, run by the Devine family. A small studio theatre opened on the pub's first floor as the Old Red Lion Theatre Club. Under artistic director Charlie Hanson, it became a place for actors, directors, designers, writers, and technicians to experiment.

After the King's Cross fire in 1987, the theatre was threatened with closure due to the tightening of fire regulations. Artistic director Ken McClymont raised funds to install a fire escape, to keep the theatre from closing.

=== Heritage listing (1994) ===
The pub was Grade II listed in 1994 by Historic England.

== Description and people ==
The Old Red Lion's address is 418 St John Street.

Damien Devine was the landlord of the Old Red Lion for 21 years, as well as executive director of the theatre. As of 2025, the pub and theatre are under new management.

The literary department reads over 1,000 scripts each year, under an open submissions policy.

== Artistic directors ==
- Charlie Hanson (1979–1981)
- Jane Goldman (1981–82)
- Mike Gilmore (1982–74)
- Richard Hansom (1984–88)
- Ken McClymont (1988–2002)
- Melanie Tait (2002–2004)
- Helen Devine (2004–2010)
- Henry Filloux-Bennett (Artistic Director 2010–2011) (Co-Artistic Director) (2011–2012)
- Nicholas Thompson (Co-Artistic Director) (2011–2012) (Artistic Director 2012–2014)
- Stewart Pringle (Artistic Director) (2014–2016)
- Clive Judd (Artistic Director) (2016–2017)
- Katy Danbury (Artistic Director & Theatre Manager) (2017–2019)
- Alexander Knott (Artistic Director, Theatre Manager & Digital Producer) (2019–2021)
- Helen Devine (Programmer, 2021 (Note: During the COVID-19 pandemic, keeping it open as much as possible.) – May 2023)
- Jack Robertson (May 2023– present)

Jack Robertson, originally from Manchester, has a master's degree in playwriting, but has spent most of his career doing sketch comedy, with directing, producing, and acting as extra-curricular activities. His company, Medium Rare Productions, won "Best Comedy Play" at the Greater Manchester Fringe Festival in 2019.

== Awards ==
- 2006: Dan Crawford Pub Theatre Award
- 2006: Empty Space Peter Brook Award

== Notable past productions ==
Nina Raine, winner of the 2006 Most Promising Playwright Award, staged her first show, Rabbit, at the Old Red Lion Theatre in March to April 2006. Who is Eddie Linden, a play based upon Sebastian Barker's biography of poet and editor Eddie Linden, was staged in 1995.

Mischief Theatre's The Play That Goes Wrong, which has run in the West End since 2014 as well as touring internationally, received its premiere at the Old Red Lion in 2012.
