= Peter Pan Goes Wrong =

Play by Henry Lewis, Jonathan Sayer, and Henry Shields

- Original language: English
- Written by: Henry Lewis, Jonathan Sayer and Henry Shields
- Based on: Peter Pan by J. M. Barrie
- Genre: Comedy

Premiere
- Date: 10 December 2013
- Place: Pleasance Theatre, London
- Official website

Peter Pan Goes Wrong is a comedy play by Henry Lewis, Jonathan Sayer, and Henry Shields of the Mischief Theatre company, creators of The Play That Goes Wrong (2012).

== Premise ==
The fictitious Cornley Polytechnic Drama Society attempts to stage a production of the 1904 J. M. Barrie play Peter and Wendy, which is repeatedly ruined by the amateurism and personal rivalries of the cast and crew and the insistence that the director believes it is a serious play rather than a pantomime.

== Production history ==
=== London ===
The play made its premiere at the Pleasance Theatre in London in December 2013 before touring the UK in 2014. The production transferred to the West End in London at the Apollo Theatre for a Christmas season run in 2015, running from 4 December 2015 to 26 February 2016. It featured the original cast of The Play That Goes Wrong reprising their cast and crew characters from the original production, with the addition of Daisy Waterstone as Robert's niece Lucy.

It returned to the Apollo Theatre the following year for another Christmas season run from 21 October 2016 to 29 January 2017, making it the third show running in the West End from the Mischief Theatre Company after The Play That Goes Wrong and The Comedy About A Bank Robbery.

Great Ormond Street Hospital Children's Charity benefited from royalties of the play, in accordance to the terms of the Copyright, Designs and Patents Act 1988 which granted them a right to royalty in perpetuity from adaptations of the story of Peter Pan on stage, publication and film in the UK.

=== UK tour ===
It was announced in April 2019 that the show would embark on a UK Tour starting in October 2019 at The Everyman Theatre in Cheltenham before visiting Cardiff, Cambridge, Brighton, Salford and stopping in London at the Alexandra Palace for a Christmas run from 13 December 2019 till 5 January 2020.

=== North American premiere ===
It was announced in January 2022 that the show would have its North American premiere starting 8 September 2022 at The Citadel Theatre in Edmonton, Alberta with an all Canadian cast. The show ran from 26 February to 20 March 2022.

It was then announced in August 2022 the show would play at The Arts Club Theatre Company in Vancouver, British Columbia with the same cast. The show ran from 8 September - 16 October 2022.

=== Broadway ===
It was announced on 5 January 2023 that the show would transfer to Broadway at the Ethel Barrymore Theatre for a limited sixteen and a half weeks beginning 17 March 2023, with an opening night set for 19 April 2023, featuring the majority of the original cast. On 3 April 2023 it was announced that Neil Patrick Harris would be joining the cast for a limited engagement. On 8 June 2023, it was announced Ellie Kemper would join the cast for a limited engagement.

After the conclusion of its limited engagement, the production had its West Coast premiere in Los Angeles, California at the Ahmanson Theatre for another limited five weeks, once again featuring the majority of the original Mischief cast. Performances began 8 August 2023 with an opening night of 11 August and special guest Bradley Whitford as the Narrator until 20 August. On 30 August, Daniel Dae Kim took over as the Narrator until 10 September. On 25 August a one-week extension was announced with Neil Patrick Harris returning to the role of Francis until its official closing night of 17 September 2023.

== Television special ==
The play was adapted into a one-hour television special which was broadcast on 31 December 2016 on BBC One, guest-starring David Suchet as the narrator, and featuring the original cast, with the exception of Rob Falconer. It was filmed in front of a live audience at dock10 studios and featured additional footage of other BBC television sets being accidentally invaded.

== Roles and principal casts ==
=== Casts ===
Character	Off-West End	Pre-West End Tour	West End	BBC Broadcast	West End	UK Tour	Edmonton	Broadway	West End Revival	2nd UK Tour
Character	2013	2014	2015	2016	2016-17	2019	2022	2023		2023-24
Trevor Watson Stagehand	Rob Falconer	Chris Leask	Chris Leask	Chris Leask	Bailey Patrick	Ethan Moorhouse	Sebastian Kroon	Chris Leask	Chris Leask	Jake Burgum
Chris Bean Hook / Mr Darling	Henry Shields	Laurence Pears	Henry Shields	Henry Shields	Harry Kershaw	Connor Crawford	Andrew MacDonald-Smith	Henry Shields	Harry Kershaw	Jack Michael Stacey
Robert Grove Nana / Shadow / Pirate	Henry Lewis	Cornelius Booth	Henry Lewis	Henry Lewis	Oliver Senton	Oliver Senton	Chris Cochrane	Henry Lewis	Matthew Howell	Matthew Howell
Max Bennett Crocodile / Michael Darling	Dave Hearn	Matthew Cavendish	Dave Hearn	Dave Hearn	Matthew Cavendish	Tom Babbage	Oscar Derkx	Matthew Cavendish	Matthew Cavendish	Theo Toksvig-Stewart
Francis Beaumont Narrator	Harry Kershaw	Harry Kershaw	Tom Edden	—N/a	Laurence Pears	Patrick Warner	April Banigan	Harry Kershaw	Jean-Luke Worrell	Jean-Luke Worrell
Sandra Wilkinson Wendy Darling	Charlie Russell	Leonine Hill	Charlie Russell	Charlie Russell	Bryony Corrigan	Katy Daghorn	Alexandra Brynn	Charlie Russell	Charlie Russell	Ciara Morris
Dennis Tyde John Darling	Jonathan Sayer	James Marlowe	Jonathan Sayer	Jonathan Sayer	Sydney K Smith	Romayne Andrews	Alexander Ariate	Jonathan Sayer	Clark Devlin	Clark Devlin
Annie Twilloil Mrs Darling / Tinker Bell	Nancy Zamit	Naomi Sheldon	Nancy Zamit	Nancy Zamit	Adeline Waby	Phoebe Ellabani	Belinda Cornish	Nancy Zamit	Nancy Zamit	Jamie Birkett
Jill Jones	—N/a	—N/a	—N/a	—N/a	Katherine Carlton	—N/a	—N/a	Bianca Horn	—N/a	—N/a
Jonathan Harris Peter Pan	Greg Tannahill	Alex Bartram	Greg Tannahill	Greg Tannahill	Daniel Pitout	Ciaran Kellgren	Jamie Cavanagh	Greg Tannahill	Greg Tannahill	Gareth Tempest
Lucy Grove Tootles	Daisy Waterstone	Rosie Abraham	Ellie Morris	Ellie Morris	Susan Harrison	Georgia Bradley	Rochelle Laplante	Ellie Morris	Ellie Morris	Rosemarie Akwafo

==== Replacements ====
===== BBC Broadcast (2016) =====
- Narrator: David Suchet

===== West End (2016) =====
- Jonathan Harris/Peter Pan: Orville Peck (as Daniel Pitout)

===== Broadway (2023) =====
- Francis Beaumont/Narrator: Neil Patrick Harris, Ellie Kemper
- Dennis Tyde: Bartley Booz (Previews)

===== Los Angeles (2023) =====
- Francis Beaumont/Narrator: Bradley Whitford, Daniel Dae Kim, Neil Patrick Harris

=== Characters ===
- Trevor Watson, Peter Pan's head technician
- Chris Bean, Peter Pan's director and also plays Mr. Darling and Captain Hook
- Robert Grove, Peter Pan's assistant director and also plays Nana, the Shadow, and Gentleman Starkey
- Max Bennett, plays Michael Darling and the Crocodile
- Francis Beaumont, plays the Narrator and Cecco
- Sandra Wilkinson, plays Wendy Darling
- Dennis Tyde, plays John Darling and Smee
- Annie Twilloil, plays Liza, Mrs. Darling, Tinker Bell, and Curly
- Jill, a technician and EMT
- Jonathan Harris, plays Peter Pan
- Lucy Grove, plays Tootles and is Robert's niece

== Awards and nominations ==
=== Original London production ===
Year	Award ceremony	Category	Result
2016	Olivier Award	Best New Comedy	Nominated

=== BBC broadcast ===
Year	Award ceremony	Category	Nominee	Result
2017	Knight of Illumination Awards	SLX Award for Light Entertainment	Martin Kempton	Won

=== Original Broadway production ===
Year	Award ceremony	Category	Nominee	Result
2023	Outer Critics Circle Awards	Outstanding New Broadway Play		Nominated
2023	Outer Critics Circle Awards	Outstanding Scenic Design (Play or Musical)	Simon Scullion	Nominated
2023	Outer Critics Circle Awards	Outstanding Director of a Play	Adam Meggido	Nominated
2023	Drama Desk Awards	Unique Theatrical Experience		Won
2023	Drama Desk Awards	Outstanding Costume Design of a Play	Roberto Surace	Nominated
2023	Drama Desk Awards	Outstanding Direction of a Play	Adam Meggido	Nominated
2023	Drama League Award	Outstanding Production of a Play		Nominated
2023	Broadway.com Audience Choice Awards	Favorite New Play		Won
2023	Broadway.com Audience Choice Awards	Favorite Featured Actor in a Play	Matthew Cavendish	Nominated
2023	Broadway.com Audience Choice Awards	Favorite Featured Actress in a Play	Nancy Zamit	Nominated

== Reception ==
Peter Pan Goes Wrong received positive reviews, including WhatsOnStage.com rating it five out of five stars.

The original West End run was nominated for the 2016 Laurence Olivier Award for Best New Comedy but lost to Nell Gwynn.

== See also ==
- The Play That Goes Wrong
- The Comedy About a Bank Robbery
- Noises Off
