= Apollo Theatre =

West End theatre in London

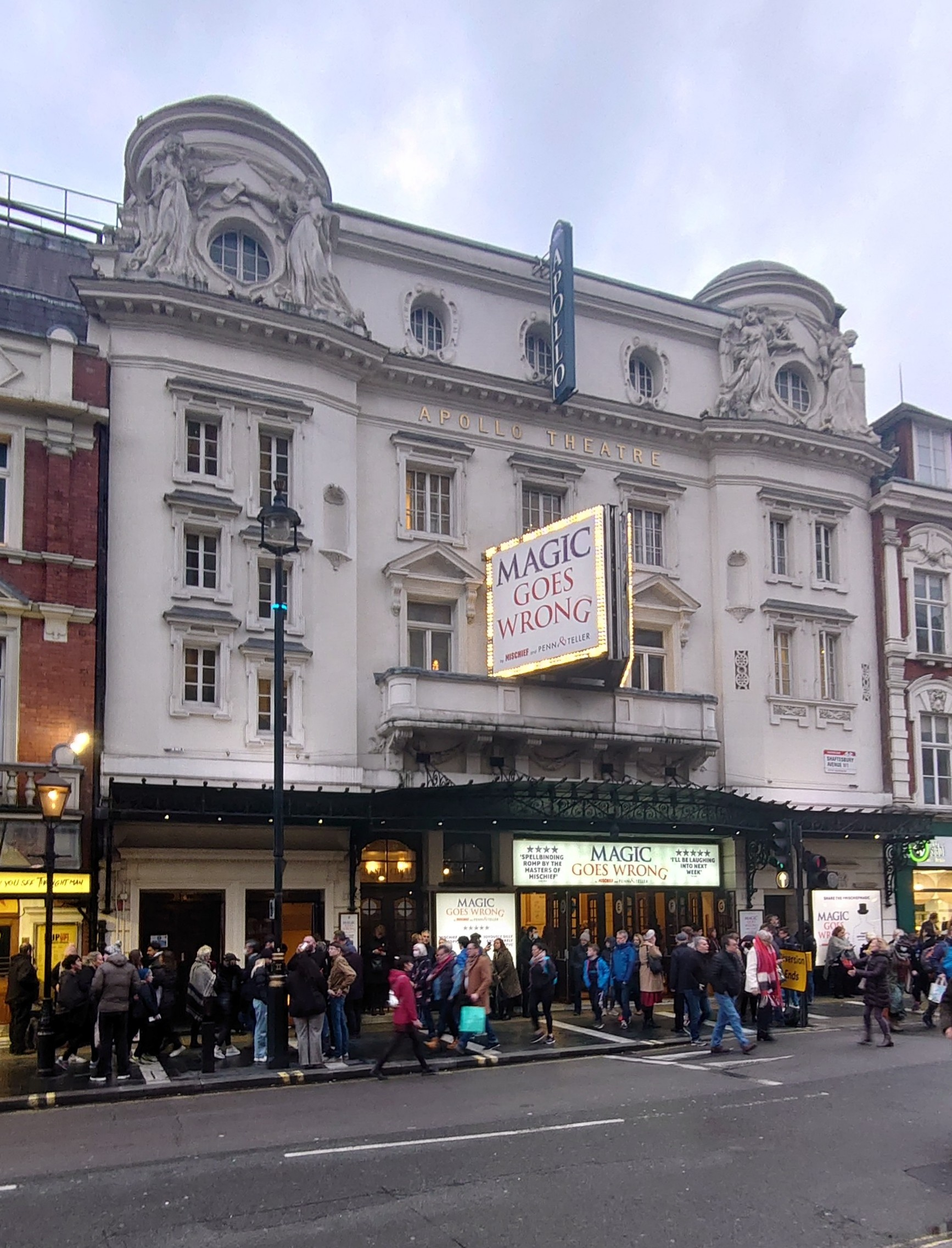
- The theatre showing Magic Goes Wrong in 2022
- Interactive map of Apollo Theatre
- Address: Shaftesbury Avenue; London, W1; United Kingdom
- Coordinates: 51.511472°N 0.133417°W
- Owner: Nimax Theatres
- Capacity: 658
- Type: West End theatre
- Designation: Grade II
- Production: Derren Brown: Only Human
- Public transit: Piccadilly Circus

Construction
- Opened: 21 February 1901; 125 years ago
- Architect: Lewin Sharp

Website
- nimaxtheatres.com/apollo-theatre/

The Apollo Theatre is a Grade II listed West End theatre in Shaftesbury Avenue in the City of Westminster, in central London. Designed by the architect Lewin Sharp for owner Henry Lowenfeld, it became the fourth legitimate theatre to be constructed on the street when it opened its doors on 21 February 1901, with the American musical comedy The Belle of Bohemia.

== History ==
=== Construction ===
Henry Lowenfeld had bought land on the newly created Shaftesbury Avenue at the turn of the 20th century—next door to the Lyric Theatre, which opened in 1888—and as a consequence the Apollo is one of the few theatres in London to be freehold.

The only complete theatre design of architect Lewin Sharp, the Apollo was specifically designed for musical theatre and named after the Greek god of the arts and leader of the muses. It was constructed by builder Walter Wallis of plain London brick in keeping with the neighbouring streets; the front piece is in the Renaissance style with a sculpted stone fascia by T. Simpson. The structure encloses a four-level auditorium, with three cantilevered balconies and a first-floor central loggia, decorated in the Louis XIV Style by Hubert van Hooydonk. In keeping with then European style, each level has its own foyer and promenade.

Owing to the death of Queen Victoria the previous month, it became the first London theatre to be completed in the Edwardian period. The capacity on the opening night, 21 February 1901, was 893, with a proscenium of 9.14 metres (30.0 ft) wide and 8.89 metres (29.2 ft) deep.

The capacity today is 757 seats, with the balcony on the 3rd tier considered the steepest in London.

=== Operations ===
Owing to a relatively unsuccessful opening, impresario Tom B. Davis took a lease on the building, and hence management of operations, from 1902. The theatre was renovated by Ernest Schaufelberg in 1932, with a private foyer and anteroom installed to the Royal Box. Prince Littler took control of the theatre in 1944.

Stoll Moss Group purchased the theatre in 1975, selling it to Andrew Lloyd Webber's Really Useful Group and Bridgepoint Capital in 2000. Nica Burns and Max Weitzenhoffer purchased the theatre and several others in 2005, creating Nimax Theatres, which still owns the theatre.

=== 2013 ceiling collapse ===
On 19 December 2013, at about 20:15 GMT, 10 square metres (110 sq ft) of the auditorium's ornate plasterwork ceiling collapsed around 40 minutes into a performance of The Curious Incident of the Dog in the Night-Time. It brought down a lighting rig and a section of balcony, thereby trapping two people and injuring around 88, including seven seriously. There were 720 people in the audience at the time. The incident was preceded by heavy rain.

The emergency services responded with 25 ambulance crews, an air ambulance rapid response team, eight fire engines with more than 50 firefighters, and the Metropolitan Police. Casualties were taken to the foyers of the adjacent Gielgud and Queen's theatres, where the emergency services could triage. The London Ambulance Service later stated that they had treated 76 injured people, with 58 taken to four London hospitals, some on commandeered buses. Guy's and St Thomas' NHS Foundation Trust said 34 adults and 5 children were subsequently treated in accident and emergency at St Thomas' Hospital.

The venue reopened on 26 March 2014, with an adaptation of Let the Right One In produced by the National Theatre of Scotland. The owners were able to reopen the theatre by sealing the fourth level and balcony with a temporary floor, which allowed investigators to continue their work in determining the cause of the collapse. That month Westminster City Council issued a notice to other historic theatres saying that the ceiling collapse appeared to have been caused by the gradual deterioration of Hessian wadding mixed into plaster of Paris to form the ties lashing timbers together, which had probably been in place since the theatre was built.

== Production history ==
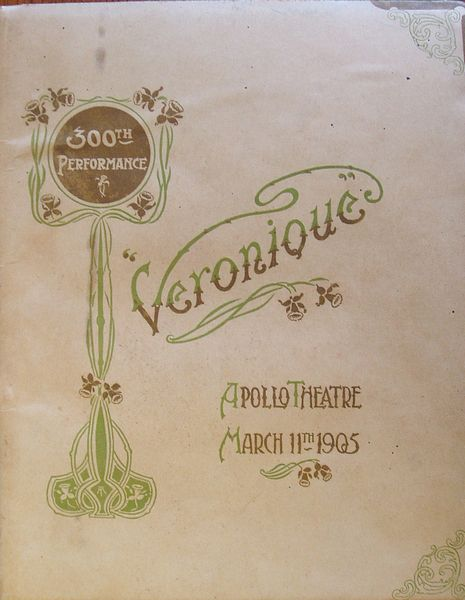
Souvenir of 300th performance of Véronique at the theatre in 1905

The opening caused a public uproar, with a selected audience for the first performance, on Thursday 21 February 1901, and the first public performance scheduled for 22 February. The Times refused to review the private opening, instead waiting until the first public production on the following day. The opening production was the American musical comedy The Belle of Bohemia, which survived for 72 performances—17 more than it had accomplished when produced on Broadway. The production was followed by John Martin-Harvey's season, including A Cigarette Maker's Romance and The Only Way, an adaptation of Charles Dickens' A Tale of Two Cities.

George Edwardes produced a series of successful Edwardian musical comedies, including Kitty Grey (1901), Three Little Maids and The Girl from Kays (1902). An English version of André Messager's light opera Véronique became a hit in 1904, starring with Ruth Vincent, who also starred in Edward German's Tom Jones in 1907 in which Cicely Courtneidge made her London debut. Between 1908 and 1912 the theatre hosted H. G. Pelissier's The Follies. After this it staged a variety of works, including seasons of plays by Charles Hawtrey in 1913, 1914 and 1924, and Harold Brighouse's Hobson's Choice in 1916. Inside the Lines by Earl Derr Biggers ran for 421 performances in 1917. Gilbert Dayle's What Would a Gentleman Do? played in 1918 and Tilly of Bloomsbury by Ian Hay was the success in 1919.

George Grossmith, Jr. and Edward Laurillard managed the theatre from 1920 to 1923, presenting a series of plays and revivals, including Such a Nice Young Man by H.F. Maltby (1920) and Trilby (1922), the latter based on the 1894 George du Maurier novel of the same name. They had produced The Only Girl here in 1916 and Tilly of Bloomsbury in 1919. The Fake was produced in 1924, starring Godfrey Tearle. 1927 saw Abie's Irish Rose and Whispering Wires, with Henry Daniel. The next year, Laurence Olivier starred in R. C. Sherriff's Journey's End. Seán O'Casey's The Silver Tassie and Ivor Novello's A Symphony in Two Flats both played in 1929. Diana Wynyard starred as Charlotte Brontë in Clemence Dane's Wild Decembers in 1932. Marion Lorne was the star of a number of plays by her husband Walter Hackett from 1934 to 1937. Ian Hay's Housemaster had the most successful run in this period with 662 performances from 1936. Raymond Massey starred in Robert Sherwood's Pulitzer Prize-winning Idiot's Delight in 1938. Patrick Hamilton's play Gaslight held the stage in 1939, and Terence Rattigan's Flare Path played in 1942.

Control of the theatre transferred to Prince Littler in 1944. John Clements and Kay Hammond starred that year in a revival of Noël Coward's Private Lives, and Margaret Rutherford starred in The Happiest Days of Your Life in 1948, followed by Sybil Thorndike and Lewis Casson in Treasure Hunt, directed by John Gielgud in 1949. After this, Seagulls Over Sorrento ran for over three years beginning in 1950. The theatre's longest run was the comedy Boeing-Boeing, starring Patrick Cargill and David Tomlinson, which opened in 1962 and transferred to the Duchess Theatre in 1965. In 1968 Gielgud starred in Alan Bennett's Forty Years On, and in 1970 he returned in David Storey's Home, with Ralph Richardson. He returned to the theatre in 1988, at the age of 83, in The Best of Friends by Hugh Whitemore.

A number of hit comedies transferred to or from the theatre in the 1970s and 1980s, and other important plays here during the period included Rattigan's Separate Tables, with John Mills in 1977, Romantic Comedy with Tom Conti and Pauline Collins in 1983, Lyle Kessler's Orphans in 1986 with Albert Finney, I'm Not Rappaport the same year, with Paul Scofield, and Dorothy Tutin, Eileen Atkins and Siân Phillips in Thursday's Ladies in 1987. Driving Miss Daisy played in 1988, starring Wendy Hiller, and 1989 saw Zoë Wanamaker in Mrs Klein, Vanessa Redgrave in A Madhouse in Goa, Thunderbirds FAB starring Andrew Dawson and Gavin Robertson, and Peter O'Toole in Jeffrey Bernard Is Unwell. Penelope Wilton starred in Rattigan's The Deep Blue Sea in 1993, and In Praise of Love played in 1995 with Peter Bowles. Mark Little starred in the Laurence Olivier Award-winning one-man show, Defending the Caveman in 1999.

=== Selected post-1999 productions ===
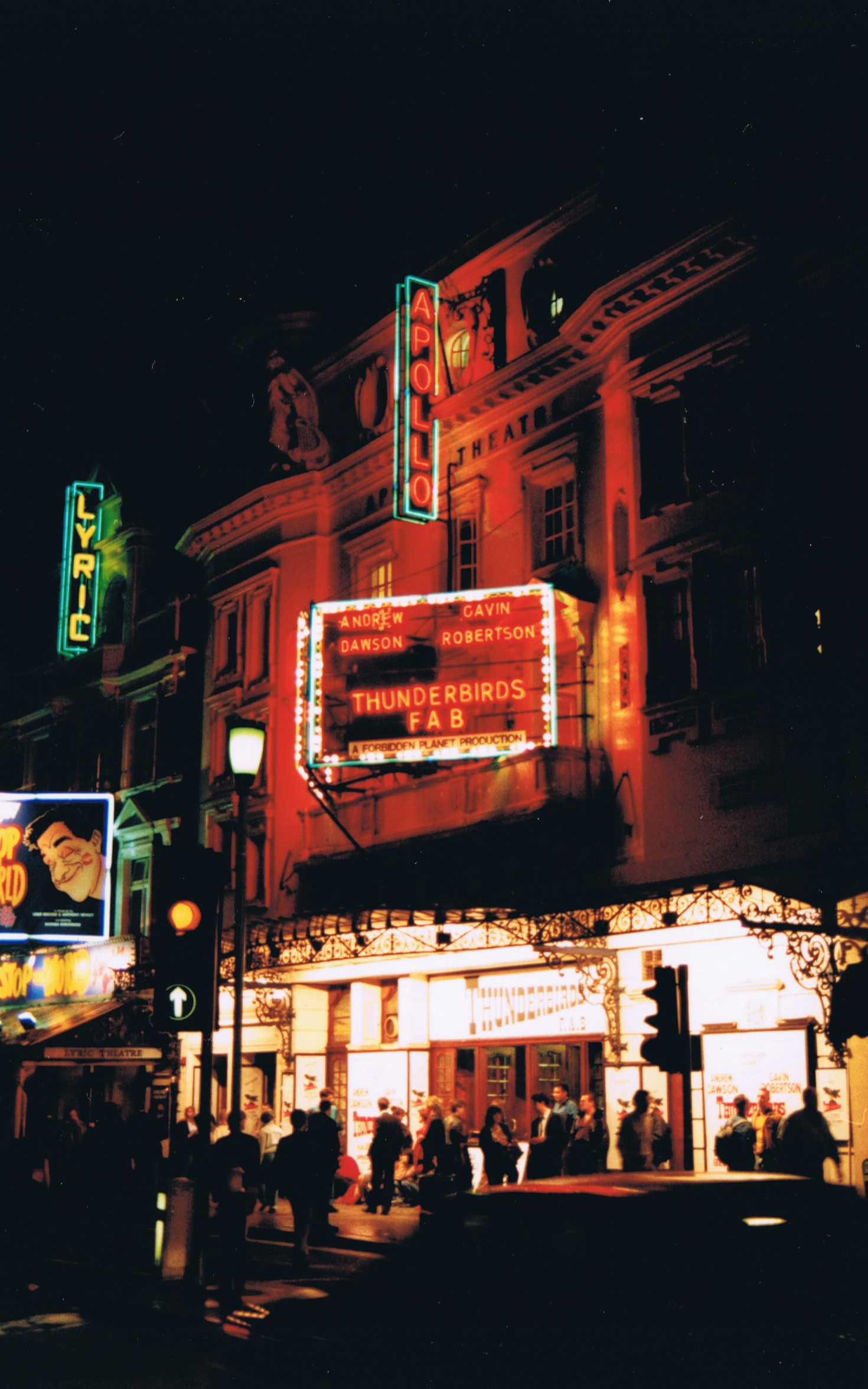
The facade in 1989, during a production of Thunderbirds FAB

- Side Man (2000) with Jason Priestley
- Fallen Angels (2000) with Felicity Kendal and Frances de la Tour
- The Odd Couple (2001)
- Noël Coward's Star Quality (2001) with Penelope Keith and Una Stubbs
- Arthur Miller's The Price (2003) with Warren Mitchell
- The Goat or Who is Sylvia? (2004) with Jonathan Pryce
- David Mamet's A Life in the Theatre (2005) with Patrick Stewart and Joshua Jackson
- Mary Stuart (2005) with Harriet Walter
- Edward Albee's Who's Afraid of Virginia Woolf? (2006) with Kathleen Turner
- Tennessee Williams' Summer and Smoke (2006) with Rosamund Pike
- The Glass Menagerie (2007) with Jessica Lange
- The Last Five Years (2007)
- Glengarry Glen Ross (2007) with Jonathan Pryce
- An Audience with the Mafia (2008)
- The Vortex (2008) with Felicity Kendal
- Divas (2008)
- Rain Man (2008) with Josh Hartnett and Adam Godley
- Three Days of Rain (2009) with James McAvoy and Nigel Harman
- Carrie's War (2009) with Prunella Scales
- Jerusalem (2010)
- All My Sons (2010) with David Suchet and Zoë Wanamaker
- The Country Girl (2010–2011) with Martin Shaw and Jenny Seagrove
- Blithe Spirit (2011) with Alison Steadman
- Yes Prime Minister (2011)
- Jerusalem (2011–2012)
- The Madness of George III (2012)
- Long Day's Journey Into Night (2012) with David Suchet
- Richard III and Twelfth Night (2012) with Mark Rylance and Stephen Fry
- The Curious Incident of the Dog in the Night-Time (2013–2014)
- Let the Right One In (2014)
- Urinetown (2014)
- My Night with Reg (2015)
- The Audience (2015) with Kristin Scott Thomas
- Dear Lupin (2015) with James Fox and Jack Fox
- Peter Pan Goes Wrong (2015–2016)
- Nell Gwynn (2016) with Gemma Arterton
- The Go-Between (2016) with Michael Crawford
- Travesties (2017) with Tom Hollander and Freddie Fox
- Cat on a Hot Tin Roof (2017) with Sienna Miller and Jack O'Connell
- Everybody's Talking About Jamie (2017–2021)
- Magic Goes Wrong (2021–2022)
- Jerusalem (2022)
- Cruise (2022) with Jack Holden
- The Upstart Crow (2022) with David Mitchell and Gemma Whelan
- Derren Brown – Showman (2022–2023)
- 2:22 A Ghost Story (2023)
- The Time Traveller's Wife (2023–2024) with David Hunter and Joanna Woodward
- Mind Mangler: Member of the Tragic Circle (2024)
- Fawlty Towers: The Play (2024–2025)
- Punch (2025)
- A Christmas Carol Goes Wrong (2025–2026)
- I'm Sorry, Prime Minister (2026) with Griff Rhys Jones and Clive Francis
- The Guy Who Didn’t Like Musicals (2026) by StarKid Productions
- The Truth (2026) with Stephen Mangan, Ardal O'Hanlon, Sarah Hadland and Janie Dee
