= Henry Shields =

English playwright and actor

Henry Shields (Playwright)
- Born: Henry James William Shields; 21 August 1988 (age 38); Hastings, East Sussex, England
- Education: London Academy of Music and Dramatic Art, Cranbrook School, Kent
- Occupation: Actor
- Years active: 2008–present

Henry James William Shields (born 21 August 1988) is an English playwright and actor. Shields grew up in Hastings and his family still lives there. He initially studied nursing at university but dropped out after a year and auditioned for drama school, gaining a place at LAMDA. It was while there that he met the collaborators with whom he would go on to form Mischief Theatre company. He is best known for starring in the plays The Play That Goes Wrong, Peter Pan Goes Wrong, and The Comedy About a Bank Robbery, which he also co-wrote along with Henry Lewis and Jonathan Sayer, as well as the TV adaptation The Goes Wrong Show. He has been nominated for three Olivier Awards for Best New Comedy, winning in 2015 for The Play That Goes Wrong.

== Awards and nominations ==
Year	Award	Category	Work	Result
2014	WhatsOnStage Award	Best New Comedy	The Play That Goes Wrong	Won
2015	Laurence Olivier Award	Best New Comedy	The Play That Goes Wrong	Won
2016	Laurence Olivier Award	Best New Comedy	Peter Pan Goes Wrong	Nominated
2017	Laurence Olivier Award	Best New Comedy	The Comedy About a Bank Robbery	Nominated
2017	Drama League Award	Best Play	The Play That Goes Wrong	Nominated
2020	Laurence Olivier Award	Best New Comedy	Magic Goes Wrong	Nominated
