= Mischief Theatre =

British theatre company

- Mischief cast in a promotional image for The Goes Wrong Show, 2020
- Formation: 2008; 18 years ago
- Type: Theatre group
- Location: London, England
- Artistic director: Henry Lewis
- Website: https://mischiefcomedy.com/

Mischief Theatre is a British theatre company that was founded in 2008 by a group of students from the London Academy of Music and Dramatic Art in West London, and directed by Henry Lewis, Jonathan Sayer, and Henry Shields. The group originally began by doing improvised comedy shows, but by 2012, they expanded into comedic theatrical performances that include choreographed routines, jokes, and stunts.

The company is primarily known for their comedic performances as the fictional theatre company, The Cornley Polytechnic Drama Society, enacting amateur performances that go wrong. Works by the company includes the award-winning 2012 stage play The Play That Goes Wrong and the BBC television series The Goes Wrong Show. Several of the stage performances by the company have been shown in the West End of London, and also in theaters throughout the United Kingdom and across North America and Europe.

== History ==
Mischief Theatre was formed in 2008 by Henry Lewis, Jonathan Sayer, and Henry Shields, while the three were studying in a drama foundation course at the London Academy of Music and Dramatic Art. The founders selected the company's members, a majority of which were attending the same course, including Dave Hearn, Nancy Zamit, Bryony Corrigan, and Niall Ransome. The company conducted its first performance, Let's See What Happens, at The Questors Studio Theatre in July 2008, which they later performed at The Edinburgh Festival the following month.

In 2012, Lewis, Sayer, and Shields devised the script for The Play That Goes Wrong, originally titled The Murder Before Christmas, a comedic play based on real-life accidents and problems that can occur in stage productions. With the play, the company branched into choreographed performances, including stage combat, stunts, and staged technical malfunctions. The play premiered in London later that year, went on multiple UK tours, and was featured at the 2015 Royal Variety Performance show. Lewis, Sayer, and Shields continued to devise new shows for Mischief Theatre, based on both improvisational comedy and scripted performances, including Lights! Camera! Improvise!, Late Night Impro Fight, and Mischief Movie Night.

The play Peter Pan Goes Wrong made its premiere at the Pleasance Theatre in London in December 2013 before touring the UK in 2014. The production transferred to the West End in London at the Apollo Theatre for a Christmas season run in 2015. In 2016, Mischief Theatre was approached by the BBC to conduct a televised Christmas special consisting of an adaptation of the stage play. The Peter Pan Goes Wrong adaptation proved a success, with the BBC later commissioning the company to develop a new Christmas special in 2017, A Christmas Carol Goes Wrong.

On 1 April 2020, Mischief Theatre began a weekly podcast titled "Mischief Makers", which focused on the members of the troupe. During the COVID-19 pandemic, Mischief Theatre put on improvisational comedy shows (Mischief Movie Night) in open-air venues from late August to early September. They briefly took the show to the Vaudeville Theatre in December before national lockdown procedures caused venues to close, forcing their planned schedule to be cut short. To compensate for this, the company conducted their show online, under the title Mischief Movie Night In.

== The Cornley Polytechnic Drama Society ==
The company is most well known for their series of "Goes Wrong" productions wherein they portray the fictional Cornley Polytechnic Drama Society, struggling to perform amateur shows as they slowly fall apart. In-universe, the troupe is composed of university students who spend their free time outside of classes producing shows, though in recent years their televised work has been supported by the BBC. For non-European audiences, they are presented as the Cornley University Drama Society.

The characters are maintained across all of the company's "Goes Wrong" productions (with the exception of Magic Goes Wrong), and their personalities are fleshed out over time. Members of Mischief therefore portray their Cornley characters while also portraying the characters of whatever play they are doing in-universe.

- Chris Bean (originated by Henry Shields) is Cornley's director and primary lead actor. At the helm of most of the troupe's often complicated productions, he is consistently exasperated by his fellow members and the mistakes that inevitably happen, though he is not above the occasional slip-up as well. He views his work as extremely serious and gets hot-headed when others regard it as silly and fun.
- Robert Grove (originated by Henry Lewis) is Cornley's wannabe lead actor, who is frequently at odds with Chris over leading roles. He is bold and brash, believing that the key to a good performance is to simply be louder than everyone else. For a short time, he took over as director but after many mishaps, Chris was reinstated.
- Dennis Tyde (originated by Jonathan Sayer) is a supporting player within the troupe, though his inability to remember his lines often means he is relegated to playing objects rather than people. The Play That Goes Wrong establishes his stage fright and embarrassment over mistakes, but in succeeding productions he has been characterized more by his extreme obliviousness instead. There have been a couple of instances where he'll recite a fellow actor's lines (and occasionally, the play script's stage directions) in perfect verbatim while still forgetting his own lines, an action that often times confuses those around him.
- Sandra Wilkinson (originated by Charlie Russell) is Cornley's lead actress. Like Chris, she is a comedic foil, often getting annoyed when her fellow actors make mistakes, but is not immune to them. She has a habit of sneaking seductive looks to the audience or camera, which can undermine her previous dialogue or her character in general. Her love life with a few of her fellow actors becomes a recurring plot point across productions.
- Jonathan Harris (originated by Greg Tannahill) is a supporting player within the company who often juggles several roles. He plays the lead in Peter Pan Goes Wrong, but in A Christmas Carol Goes Wrong and from then on, his bit roles are characterized by his inability to perform properly due to certain circumstances. He is involved in a few love triangles across the Goes Wrong productions.
- Max Bennett (originated by Dave Hearn) is another supporting player who often gets giddily distracted by the audience's reactions. He is usually cast in supporting roles, despite being one of the troupe's best actors. Along with Dennis, he is one of the kindest and most innocent members of the troupe, most evident in subplots revolving around his ability as an actor or his love life.
- Annie Twilloil (originated by Nancy Zamit) is initially introduced as Cornley's stage manager in The Play That Goes Wrong, but is eventually promoted to supporting actress in subsequent productions. Like Jonathan, she tends to juggle several roles in a single production, and often plays men as well.
- Trevor Watson (originated by Rob Falconer) is Cornley's technical director who later doubles as stage manager when Annie becomes an actress. Although he works behind the scenes, he always somehow makes his presence known; he also occasionally steps up when the troupe is in need of additional actors. He was portrayed by Rob Falconer in the original run of The Play That Goes Wrong, but he was popularised by Chris Leask in subsequent Goes Wrong productions.
- Vanessa Wilcock-Wynn-Carraway (originated by Bryony Corrigan) is the latest addition to the Cornley Polytechnic Drama Society as another female player, introduced in The Goes Wrong Show. Her work in the troupe is often characterized by being injured during productions as well as a paralyzing inability to improvise, which only makes things worse when mistakes require it of her. Prior to Vanessa's introduction, Bryony Corrigan was an understudy for The Play That Goes Wrong; she later played a stagehand in Peter Pan Goes Wrong and the BBC receptionist in A Christmas Carol Goes Wrong, though it is unknown if these are all separate characters.
- Lucy Grove (recurring; originated by Daisy Waterstone): Introduced in Peter Pan Goes Wrong, she is the niece of Robert Grove, and receives frequent criticism and coaching of her performances. Though originally portrayed by Daisy Waterstone, she has been popularised by Ellie Morris in subsequent Goes Wrong productions.

== Stage productions ==
=== The Play That Goes Wrong (2012) ===
The Play That Goes Wrong is a play by Henry Lewis, Jonathan Sayer, and Henry Shields. It premiered at the Old Red Lion Theatre in London in 2012, moved to Trafalgar Studios in 2013, toured the UK and internationally in 2014 and opened to the Duchess Theatre in the West End on 14 September 2014. In the play, The Cornley Polytechnic Drama Society attempt to put on a 1920s murder mystery, but the performance is beset with increasingly intricate disasters and the accident-prone cast are forced to struggle through every scene.

It won Best New Comedy at the 2015 Laurence Olivier Awards and Best New Comedy at the WhatsOnStage.com Awards in 2014

Its run in London's West End at the Duchess Theatre has been extended multiple times, and is still currently running.

The play transferred to Broadway at the Lyceum Theatre in April 2017 with the original West End company. It closed in January 2019 before moving to the Off-Broadway theatre New World Stages and reopening in February 2019, where it continues to run. The Broadway production was followed by two North American touring companies as well as productions at Chicago's Broadway Playhouse in 2022 and The Kennedy Center in Washington D.C. from July to August 2023.

The Play that Goes Wrong has been translated and licensed for productions in over 30 other countries, including China, Hungary, France, Singapore, Puerto Rico, Brazil, and Mexico. Notable productions in other languages include Théâtre Tristan Bernard's staging in Paris, France and Teatr Variété's from February 2024 in Kraków, Poland.

=== Peter Pan Goes Wrong ===
Peter Pan Goes Wrong is a comedy play by Henry Lewis, Jonathan Sayer, and Henry Shields in the 'Goes Wrong' series. It premiered at the Pleasance Theatre in London in December 2013 before touring the UK in 2014 and 2015, and in December 2015 it opened at London's Apollo Theatre. Following widespread critical acclaim, Peter Pan Goes Wrong returned to the Apollo Theatre for a limited run from October 2016 to January 2017.

Adapted from the original stage play Peter Pan by J.M. Barrie, the play features the inept and accident-prone Cornley Polytechnic Drama Society as they set out to present the classic tale of Peter Pan with comical and disastrous results.

The production was nominated for two 2013 Offies for Best Production and Best Ensemble.

Peter Pan Goes Wrong made its Broadway debut at the Barrymore Theater on 17 March 2023 (with an opening date scheduled for 19 April 2023), featuring a majority of the original company, and a number of US Mischief alumni.

=== The Comedy About a Bank Robbery (2016) ===
The Comedy About a Bank Robbery is a comedy play, written by Lewis, Sayer and Shields. The play opened at the West End's Criterion Theatre on 31 March 2016, with an official opening night on 21 April 2016. The production closed on 15 March 2020 due to the COVID-19 pandemic.

Original cast included: Henry Lewis, Henry Shields, Jonathan Sayer, Nancy Zamit, Dave Hearn, Charlie Russell, Greg Tannahill, Jeremy Lloyd and Chris Leask.

The play is directed by Mark Bell, with set design by David Farley and costume design by Roberto Surace.

=== Lights! Camera! Improvise! and Mischief Movie Night (2009) ===
Lights! Camera! Improvise! is an improvised comedy show devised and performed by Mischief Theatre. The show was first presented at The Edinburgh Festival in August 2009 and has since been performed across the UK and internationally as well as at The Duchess Theatre in the West End.

In the show, a film collector named Oscar invites the audience to suggest genres, locations and a title for a film which he then finds in his extensive DVD collection. A company of six or seven performers then improvise a long-form narrative based on these ideas under the direction of Oscar.

In 2013 the production won a Spirit of the Fringe Award at Edinburgh Fringe Festival.

In 2017 the show, renamed Mischief Movie Night, began a limited run at The Arts Theatre in London's West End.

In 2020 Mischief Theatre began live-streaming semi-regular performances of Mischief Movie Night In during the COVID-19 pandemic.

=== Groan Ups (2019) ===
Groan Ups was written by Henry Lewis, Jonathan Sayer and Henry Shields, and was the first production of the residency, running from 20 September until 1 December 2019, featuring the original Mischief company and directed by Kirsty Patrick Ward.

=== Magic Goes Wrong (2019) ===
Magic Goes Wrong is a collaboration between the company and Penn & Teller that combines the Goes Wrong formula with actual stage magic. The production began previews 14 December 2019, prior to officially opening on 8 January 2020. It had been extended to run until August 2020, but the COVID-19 pandemic shut it down in March. The production reopened on 21 October 2021 at The Apollo Theatre for a strictly limited Christmas run.

=== The Comedy About Spies (2025) ===
The Comedy About Spies, written by Henry Lewis and Henry Shields, ran from April to September 2025 at Noël Coward Theatre in London's West End.

=== Christmas Carol Goes Wrong (2025) ===
Christmas Carol Goes Wrong written by Lewis, Shields and Sayer is based on the 2017 BBC television special and due to open at The Lowry, Salford in November 2025 on a UK tour, including a season at the Apollo Theatre in London's West End from 6 December 2025 to 26 January 2026.

=== Thespians: Greece The Musical (But Not That One) (2026) ===
Mischief will present their first musical comedy Thespians premiering with book and lyrics by Jonathan Sayer and music and lyrics by Ed Zanders. It premiered at the Mercury Theatre, Colchester from 9 to 23 May 2026 before touring the UK.

=== Additional shows ===
Mischief Theatre returned to the Edinburgh Fringe Festival in August 2022. In addition to Mischief Movie Night, Mischief also presented Mind Mangler: Member of the Tragic Circle, in which the protagonist is based on a Magic Goes Wrong character, as well as Charlie Russell Aims to Please, a solo show written and starring original company member Charlie Russell.

Outside of the official Mischief productions, company members participated in Starship Improvise at the Festival, partnering up with members of fellow improv-comedy group Showstoppers, including People Just Do Nothing actress Ruth Bratt.

In 2022 Mischief presented Good Luck, Studio, a dark comedy play written by Henry Shields and directed by Henry Lewis, and starring several regular members of Mischief. The production toured from September to November visiting Colchester, Guildford and Salisbury.

Mischief opened a revised version of Mind Mangler off-Broadway at New World Stages on 19 November 2023. Starring were original company members Henry Lewis and Jonathan Sayer. Performances ended on 28 January 2024 in preparation for a seven-week West End run in March.

== Television productions ==
=== Peter Pan Goes Wrong (2016) ===
Peter Pan Goes Wrong was adapted for a one-hour television special which was broadcast on 31 December 2016 on BBC One. It features almost the entire West End cast and guest stars David Suchet as the narrator.

=== A Christmas Carol Goes Wrong (2017) ===
On 30 December 2017, A Christmas Carol Goes Wrong aired on BBC One, featuring both Dame Diana Rigg and Sir Derek Jacobi. Following the events of the previous year, the Cornley Polytechnic Drama Society have now been blacklisted by the BBC. Determined to get back on the air, they hijack a live broadcast of Charles Dickens' A Christmas Carol. The special was watched by a reported audience of 4.61 million.

=== The Goes Wrong Show (2019-21) ===
On 22 February 2019, it was announced the company would create a six-part BBC One series titled The Goes Wrong Show. Starring the original cast and creatives behind The Play That Goes Wrong, episodes are formatted as half-hour "live" televised stage plays. The series ran for two seasons and an additional Christmas special from December 2019 to November 2021.

Peter Pan Goes Wrong, A Christmas Carol Goes Wrong and The Goes Wrong Show were filmed at dock10 studios.

== Awards and nominations ==
The Play That Goes Wrong Nominations and Awards (UK and Broadway)
| Year | Award Ceremony | Category | Nominee | Result |
|---|---|---|---|---|
| 2014 | WhatsOnStage Awards | Best New Comedy | | Won |
| 2015 | BroadwayWorld UK Awards | Best New Play | | Won |
| 2015 | Olivier Awards | Best New Comedy | | Won |
| 2017 | Broadway.com Audience Choice Awards | Favourite New Play | | Won |
| 2017 | BroadwayWorld UK Awards | Best New Play | | Won |
| 2017 | Drama League Awards | Best Play | | Nominated |
| 2017 | Drama Desk Awards | Outstanding Scenic Design of a Play | Nigel Hook | Won |
| 2017 | Tony Awards | Best Scenic Design of a Play | Nigel Hook | Won |
| 2017 | Outer Critics Circle Awards | Outstanding Set Design | Nigel Hook | Nominated |
| 2019 | BroadwayWorld | Funniest Play of the Decade | | Won |
| 2019 | Lucille Lortel Awards | Outstanding Featured Actor in a Play | Matt Walker | Nominated |

Peter Pan Goes Wrong Nominations and Awards (UK and Broadway)
| Year | Award Ceremony | Category | Nominee | Result |
|---|---|---|---|---|
| 2013 | Offie | Best Production | | Nominated |
| 2013 | Offie | Best Ensemble | | Nominated |
| 2016 | Olivier Awards | Best New Comedy | | Nominated |
| 2023 | Drama Desk Awards | Best Direction of a Play | Adam Meggido | Nominated |
| 2023 | Drama Desk Awards | Best Costume Design of a Play | Roberto Surace | Nominated |
| 2023 | Drama Desk Awards | Unique Theatrical Experience | | Won |
| 2023 | Outer Critic Circle Awards | Outstanding New Broadway Play | | Nominated |
| 2023 | Outer Critic Circle Awards | Outstanding Scenic Design | Simon Scullion | Nominated |
| 2023 | Outer Critic Circle Awards | Outstanding Director of a Play | Adam Meggido | Nominated |
| 2023 | Drama League Awards | Outstanding Production of a Play | | Nominated |
| 2023 | Broadway.com Audience Choice Awards | Favorite New Play | | Won |
| 2023 | Broadway.com Audience Choice Awards | Favorite Featured Actor in a Play | Matthew Cavendish | Nominated |
| 2023 | Broadway.com Audience Choice Awards | Favorite Featured Actress in a Play | Nancy Zamit | Nominated |

The Comedy About A Bank Robbery Nominations and Awards
| Year | Award Ceremony | Category | Result |
|---|---|---|---|
| 2017 | Olivier Awards | Best New Comedy | Nominated |
| 2020 | Mousetrap Awards | Power of the Ensemble | Nominated |

Groan Ups Nominations and Awards
| Year | Award Ceremony | Category | Result |
|---|---|---|---|
| 2020 | Mousetrap Awards | Spectacular Set | Nominated |

Magic Goes Wrong Nominations and Awards
| Year | Award | Category | Nominee | Result |
|---|---|---|---|---|
| 2020 | Laurence Olivier Awards | Best Entertainment or Comedy Play | | Nominated |
| 2022 | WhatsOnStage Awards | Best New Play | | Shortlisted |
| 2022 | WhatsOnStage Awards | Best West End Show | | Shortlisted |
| 2022 | WhatsOnStage Awards | Best Performer in a Male Identifying Role in a Play | Henry Lewis | Shortlisted |
| 2022 | WhatsOnStage Awards | Best Supporting Performer in a Male Identifying Role in a Play | Jonathan Sayer | Shortlisted |
| 2022 | WhatsOnStage Awards | Best Supporting Performer in a Female Identifying Role in a Play | Nancy Zamit | Shortlisted |
