= The Play That Goes Wrong =

British comedy play

- Official artwork for the West End production transfer to the Duchess Theatre
- Original title: The Murder Before Christmas
- Original language: English
- Written by: Henry Lewis; Jonathan Sayer; Henry Shields
- Genre: Comedy

Premiere
- Date: 4 December 2012
- Place: Old Red Lion Theatre
- Official website

The Play That Goes Wrong is a play by Henry Lewis, Jonathan Sayer, and Henry Shields of Mischief Theatre Company. The story follows a performance of a murder mystery, produced by a university drama society, during which the ill-fated theatre company encounters numerous mishaps.

The original production has been running since 2012 in London, where it won Best New Comedy at the 2015 Laurence Olivier Awards. Since 2014, the play has undertaken five tours of the UK, and a Broadway production ran from 2017–2019 and then continued off-Broadway.

== Plot ==
The Cornley Polytechnic Drama Society, after being forced by a lack of personnel to stage scaled-down productions such as Two Sisters, The Lion and The Wardrobe, Cat, and James and the Peach, has received a substantial bequest and is putting on a performance of The Murder at Haversham Manor – a 1920s murder mystery play, similar to The Mousetrap, which has the right number of parts for its members. The cast is headed by Chris Bean, who plays Inspector Carter and serves as the show's director, set designer, costume designer, props maker, box office manager, press and PR person, voice and dialect coach, and fight choreographer.

Before the play starts the backstage staff makes last-minute adjustments to the set, including trying to mend a broken mantelpiece and find a dog that has run off.

During the performance, a plethora of disasters befalls the actors, including doors sticking or failing to stay closed, loose floorboards, set pieces falling, and platforms collapsing. Cast members fall down, are struck by set pieces, misplace and break props, forget lines, miss cues, break character, drink white spirit instead of Scotch whisky, mispronounce words, step on fingers, are hidden in a grandfather clock, and are manhandled off stage. One cast member is knocked unconscious, and her replacement (the group's technician reading the lines from a script) refuses to yield when the actress returns. An actor repeats an earlier line of dialogue, cuing the other actors to repeat the whole dialogue sequence, ever more frenetically, several times. During intermission, a few of the actors will interact directly with patrons in the lobby as Bean desperately tries to corral them back into the dressing room. In the climax, virtually the whole of the remaining set collapses.

== Productions ==
=== London (2012–present) ===
The play premiered at the Old Red Lion Theatre in London in 2012, and moved to Trafalgar Studios in 2013. The play then opened at the Duchess Theatre in the West End on 14 September 2014, where it remains as the longest-running play since the theatre opened in 1929. The direction is by Mark Bell. The cast included Henry Shields as Chris, Dave Hearn as Max, Rob Falconer as Trevor, Henry Lewis as Robert, Charlie Russell as Sandra, Jonathan Sayer as Dennis, Greg Tannahill as Jonathan, and Nancy Zamit as Annie. Sets are designed by Nigel Hook and built by Splinter Scenery. Costumes are designed by Roberto Surace.

On 9 September 2026, the twelfth anniversary of the West End opening, Mischief announced that the Duchess Theatre booking had been extended to 31 January 2028, taking the production into the company's own twentieth anniversary year.

=== UK tours (2014–present) ===
The play's first UK tour began in January 2014 (prior to transferring to the Duchess Theatre in the West End) at the Marlowe Theatre in Canterbury featuring the original cast, visiting 17 venues and ending in Darlington in July.

It began a UK tour from January 2017, starting at the Theatre Royal in Bath, ending at the Cambridge Arts Theatre in August.

A UK tour occurred in 2018, starting at Royal and Derngate, Northampton.

A UK tour commenced on 13 July 2021 at the Marlowe Theatre Canterbury, and concluded at the Waterside Theatre Aylesbury on 27 November 2021.

The UK tour began at the Theatre Royal in Bath in April 2022. The original West End cast returned to this touring production for two weeks in Manchester and Newcastle.

=== Broadway (2017–2019) ===
The play opened on Broadway on 2 April 2017, after previews that began on 9 March 2017, at the Lyceum Theatre. The production, also directed by Bell, featured the original London cast, and film director J. J. Abrams made his debut as a theatrical producer. The production closed on 6 January 2019, after 745 regular performances and 27 previews.

=== Australian tour (2017) ===
A touring production began in Australia at the Comedy Theatre in Melbourne from February 2017, before heading to Adelaide, Sydney, Canberra, the Queensland Performing Arts Centre (QPAC) in Brisbane, and His Majesty's Theatre in Perth.

=== US tour (2018) ===
The play toured North America, starting in September 2018 in Pittsburgh, Pennsylvania. The original tour cast included Brandon J. Ellis as Trevor, Evan Alexander Smith as Chris, Yaegel T. Welch as Jonathan, Peyton Crim as Robert, Scott Cote as Dennis, Jamie Ann Romero as Sandra, Ned Noyes as Max, and Angela Grovey as Annie.

Another US tour launched in the fall of 2019 and continued until the COVID-19 pandemic caused it to shut down ahead of schedule. Cast members included Chris Lanceley as Chris, Chris French as Jonathan, Michael Thatcher as Robert, Jacqueline Jarrold as Sandra, Todd Buonopone as Dennis, and Adam Petherbridge as Max. Bianca Horn initially played Annie before returning to the Off-Broadway company. She was replaced by Ashley D. Kelley. Jason Bowen also initially played Trevor before swapping places with Off-Broadway's Ryan Vincent Anderson.

The national tour went out again in 2023 with a stop at Washington, D.C.'s Kennedy Center.

=== Off-Broadway (2019 – present) ===
The Broadway production transferred off-Broadway to New World Stages on 11 February 2019. It is directed by Matt DiCarlo. On 12 March 2020, production was suspended due to the COVID-19 pandemic until it reopened on 15 October 2021. It continues running in 2026.

=== Chicago (2021–2022) ===
A production opened at Chicago's Broadway Playhouse in December 2021 and closed on 21 May 2022.

=== Australia (2025) ===
An Australian tour commenced in June 2025.

== Roles and principal casts ==
=== West End Cast ===
Character	2014–15	2015–16	2016–17	2017–18	2018–19	2019	2019–22	2022–23	2023–24	2024–25	2025–26	2026–
Chris	Henry Shields	Harry Kershaw	Hayden Wood	Jack Baldwin	Patrick Warner	Jake Curran	Ross Green	Mikhail Sen	Daniel Cech-Lucas	Daniel Fraser	Jack Hardwick	Matthew Spencer
Robert	Henry Lewis	Leonard Cook	Adam Byron	Leonard Cook	Edward Judge	Kazeem Tosin Amore	David Kirkbride	Tendai Humphrey Sitima	Rolan Bell	Owen Jenkins	Robert Jackson	Raphael Bushay
Dennis	Jonathan Sayer	Niall Ransome	Drew Dillon	Sydney K Smith	Edward Howells	Benjamin McMahon	Michael Keane	Jo Ben Ayed	Keith Ramsay	Daniel Anthony	Mitesh Soni	Alex Bird
Max	Dave Hearn	James Marlowe	Daniel Millar	George Haynes	Alastair Kirton	Bobby Hirston	Jack Michael Stacey	Scott Hunter	Ross Virgo	Jay Olpin	Tom Wainwright	Joshua Lendon
Sandra	Charlie Russell	Bryony Corrigan	April Hughes	Katy Daghorn	Meg Mortell	Elena Valentine	Ellie Morris	Anya de Villiers	Lucy Doyle	Hannah Sinclair Robinson	Charlotte Scott	Lucinda Turner
Jonathan	Greg Tannahill	Laurence Pears	Oliver Llewellyn-Jenkins	Fred Gray	Jason Callender	Steven Rostance	Elan James	Oliver Mott	Luke Dayhill	Joe Bolland	Jonty Peach	Luke Wilson
Annie	Nancy Zamit	Laura Kirman	Joanne Ferguson	Lindsey Scott	Katie Bernstein	Catherine Dryden	Ciara Morris	Ashh Blackwood	Iona Fraser	Billie Hamer	Izzy Edmunds-Clarke	Ruby Ablett
Trevor	Rob Falconer	Chris Leask	Fred Gray	Daniel Poyser	Graeme Rooney	Gabriel Paul	Blayar Benn	Tomisin Ajani	Gavin Dunn	Jordan Akkaya	Ronnie Yorke	Kieron Michael
Understudies / ASMs		Adam Byron, Matt Cavendish, April Hughes, Sarah Madigan	Adam Boakes, Katy Daghorn, George Haynes, Lindsey Scott	Tom Babbage, Jamie Birkett, Sean Carey, Beth Lilly	Natasha Culley, Matthew Howell, Helana Muir, James Watterson	David Kristopher Brown, Liam Horrigan, Matthew Howell, Louisa Sexton, Laura White	Rosemarie Akwafo, Euan Bennet, Colin Burnicle, Sally Cheng, Oliver Clayton	Roisin Fahey, Charlie Richards, Stuart Vincent, Emily Waters, Jack Whittle	Harry Bradley, Elliot Goodhill, Rosie Meek, Hisham Abdel Razek, Tommi Vicky	Alex Bird, Munashe Chirisa, Colm Gleeson, Dumile Sibanda, Alice Stokoe	Alex Blackie, Jake Burgum, Kitty Devlin, Louise Hoare, Ed Shamwana	Paige Round, Harry Al-Adwani, Tom Quinn, Will Bishop, Phoenix Edwards

=== Characters ===
- Chris Bean, who plays Inspector Carter
- Jonathan Harris, who plays Charles Haversham
- Robert Grove, who plays Thomas Colleymoore
- Dennis Tyde, who plays Perkins
- Sandra Wilkinson, who plays Florence Colleymoore
- Max Bennett, who plays both Cecil Haversham and Arthur the Gardener
- Trevor Watson, the lighting and sound operator
- Annie Twilloil, the stage manager

== Related TV specials ==
The play's creators later collaborated on two television specials, an adaptation of Peter Pan Goes Wrong and a sequel titled A Christmas Carol Goes Wrong, aired on BBC One in December 2016 and 2017.

A TV series, The Goes Wrong Show, followed in 2019. In December 2019, a full series of The Goes Wrong Show was broadcast featuring 6 episodes with the same cast as the other two TV specials. Each episode was said to have received an average of 2.2 million people watching it when broadcast.

Following the success of the first series, the BBC commissioned a second series which premiered its first episode on 27 September 2021.

The French adaptation of the play, Les Faux British, translated by Gwen Aduh and Miren Pradier, was filmed at Théâtre Montparnasse and broadcast on France 3 on 13 May 2024.

== Awards and nominations ==
=== Original London production ===
Year	Award ceremony	Category	Result
2014	WhatsOnStage Award	Best New Comedy	Won
2015	BroadwayWorld UK Award	Best New Play	Won
2015	Laurence Olivier Award	Best New Comedy	Won

=== Original Broadway production ===
Year	Award ceremony	Category	Nominee	Result
2017	Tony Award	Best Scenic Design of a Play	Nigel Hook	Won
2017	Drama Desk Award	Outstanding Scenic Design of a Play	Nigel Hook	Won
2017	Outer Critics Circle Award	Outstanding Set Design	Nigel Hook	Nominated
2017	Drama League Award	Best Play		Nominated

=== Off Broadway production ===
Year	Award ceremony	Category	Nominee	Result
2019	Lucille Lortel Awards	Outstanding Featured Actor in a Play	Matt Walker	Nominated

== Reception ==
The Play That Goes Wrong received positive reviews. Tim Walker of The Telegraph gave it four out of five stars, calling it "a great-looking, brilliantly performed piece" and stated that "I have seldom, if ever, heard louder or more sustained laughter in a theatre." Mark Shenton of the London Theatre gave it four out of five stars, stating that though the play would not appeal to everyone, "you cannot fail to admire the ceaseless energy of the cast", and shared that "the real surprise is just how well-sustained the joke is."

Sarah Hemming of the Financial Times gave the play four out of five stars, noting its shared lineage with plays such as Noises Off and stated that "It's not new then, but it is often very funny." Though she found areas in the play that needed improvement ("it would be funnier if it started more subtly, rather than at full tilt.... The company could also make more of offstage dynamics"), she considered the play to be "largely a joyous show."

== International ==
The Play That Goes Wrong has been translated and licensed for productions in over 30 other countries, namely Canada, China, Hungary, Poland, Spain, Greece, Israel, Scandinavia, France, Italy, Iceland, Brazil, Germany, Austria, Switzerland, Kosovo, Belgium, The Netherlands, Mexico, Argentina, Uruguay, Colombia, Chile, Turkey, New Zealand, Hong Kong, Singapore, Philippines, Puerto Rico, South Africa, Slovakia, Slovenia, South Korea, Taiwan, Portugal (UAU), Croatia, Russia, India (Natak na Natak nu Natak by Sharman Joshi Productions), (Play that goes wrong by Prathmesh Viveki), Cyprus, and the Czech Republic.
