= Mark Rylance on screen and stage =

English actor

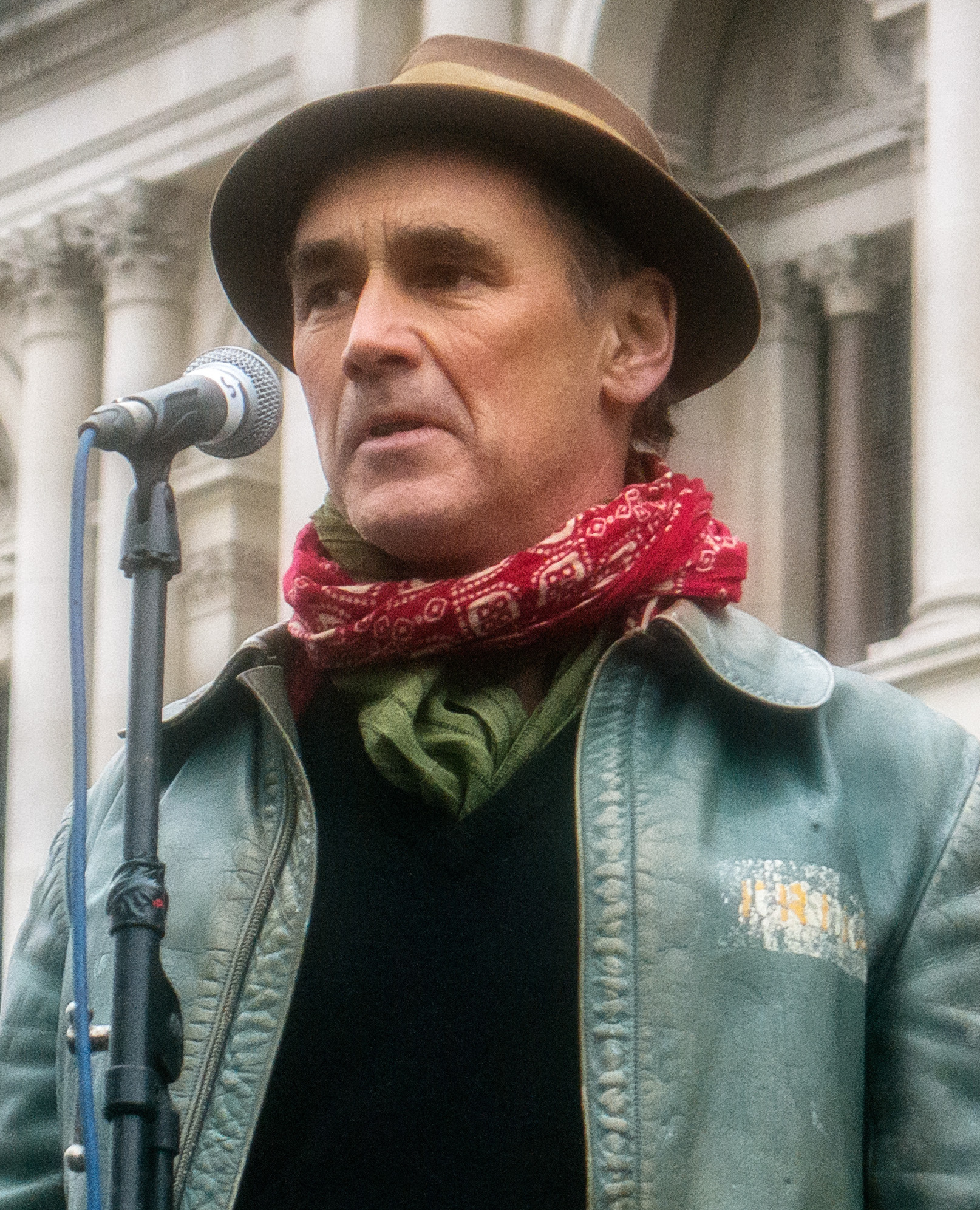
Mark Rylance in London 2015

Mark Rylance is an English actor, playwright and theatre director known for his work on stage and screen.

Rylance started his career with the Royal Shakespeare Company acting in numerous productions of William Shakespeare's work such as The Tempest (1982), A Midsummer Night's Dream (1986), Hamlet (1989), and Romeo and Juliet (1989). On the West End, he received two Laurence Olivier Awards for his roles in Much Ado About Nothing (1994), and Jerusalem (2010). On Broadway, he received three Tony Awards for his roles in Boeing-Boeing (2008), Jerusalem (2011), and Twelfth Night (2014). He was also Tony-nominated for Richard III (2014) and Farinelli and the King (2018).

He made his film debut in the musical Hearts of Fire (1987). He acted in costume dramas playing Thomas Boleyn in The Other Boleyn Girl (2008) and Henry Condell in Anonymous (2011). For his performance as Rudolf Abel in Steven Spielberg's historical drama Bridge of Spies (2015) he won the Academy Award for Best Supporting Actor. He further collaborated with Spielberg acting in The BFG (2016) and Ready Player One (2018). He also acted in Dunkirk (2017), The Trial of the Chicago 7 (2020), Don't Look Up (2021), The Outfit (2022), and Bones and All (2022).

== Performances and works ==
=== Film ===
Year	Title	Role	Director(s)	Notes	Ref.
1987	Hearts of Fire	Fizz	Richard Marquand		
1991	The Grass Arena	John Healy	Gillies MacKinnon		
1991	Prospero's Books	Ferdinand	Peter Greenaway		
1995	Institute Benjamenta	Jakob von Gunten	Brothers Quay		
1995	Angels & Insects	William Adamson	Philip Haas		
2001	Intimacy	Jay	Patrice Chéreau		
2008	The Other Boleyn Girl	Thomas Boleyn	Justin Chadwick		
2009	Nocturne	Frank	Nataasha Van Kampen	Short film	
2011	Anonymous	Henry Condell	Roland Emmerich		
2011	Blitz	Bruce Roberts	Elliott Lester		
2013	Days and Nights	Stephen	Christian Camargo		
2015	The Gunman	Terrance Cox	Pierre Morel		
2015	Bridge of Spies	Rudolf Abel	Steven Spielberg		
2016	The BFG	The BFG	Steven Spielberg	Voice and motion capture	
2017	Dunkirk	Mr Dawson	Christopher Nolan		
2018	Ready Player One	James Halliday / Anorak	Steven Spielberg		
2019	Waiting for the Barbarians	Magistrate	Ciro Guerra		
2019	The Flaneur	Narrator	Lyall Stephens	Short film	
2020	The Trial of the Chicago 7	William Kunstler	Aaron Sorkin		
2021	The Phantom of the Open	Maurice Flitcroft	Craig Roberts		
2021	Don't Look Up	Peter Isherwell	Adam McKay		
2022	The Outfit	Leonard	Graham Moore		
2022	Bones and All	Sully	Luca Guadagnino		
2022	Inland	Dunleavy	Fridtjof Ryder		
2026	Artificial	Geoffrey Hinton	Luca Guadagnino	Completed	
2027	The Nightingale	Julien Rossignol	Michael Morris	Post-production	
TBA	The Way of the Wind	Satan	Terrence Malick	Post-production	

=== Television ===
Year	Title	Role	Notes	Ref
1985	Wallenberg: A Hero's Story	Nikki Fodor	Television film	
1986–1996	Screen Two	Various roles	3 episodes	
1991	Incident in Judaea	Yeshua Ha Nozri (Jesus of Nazareth)	Television film	
1993	ScreenPlay	Conn	Episode: "Love Lies Bleeding/L'Inconnue de Belfast"	
1995	Biography	Himself / Hamlet	Episode: "The History of Hamlet"	
1997	Great Performances	King Henry V	Episode: "Henry V at Shakespeare's Globe"	
2001	Changing Stages	Himself		
2003	Leonardo	Leonardo da Vinci	3 episodes	
2003	Richard II	Richard II	Television film	
2005	The Government Inspector	David Kelly	Television film	
2014–2015	Bing	Flop (voice)	78 episodes	
2015	Wolf Hall	Thomas Cromwell	6 episodes	
2022	The Undeclared War	John Yeabsley	5 episodes	
2024	Wolf Hall: The Mirror and the Light	Thomas Cromwell	6 episodes	

=== Theatre ===
Year	Title	Role	Venue	Ref.
1981	Desperado Corner	Bazza	Citizens' Theatre	
1982	The Tempest	Ariel	Royal Shakespeare Company	
1983–84	Peter Pan	Peter Pan	Royal Shakespeare Company	
1985	Kiss of the Spiderwoman	Valentin	Bush Theatre	
1986	A Midsummer Night's Dream	Puck	Royal Opera House	
1989	Hamlet	Hamlet	Royal Shakespeare Company	
1989	Romeo and Juliet	Romeo	Royal Shakespeare Company	
1991	Hamlet	Hamlet	American Repertory Theater	
1991	The Seagull	Treplev	Pittsburgh Public Theater	
1993	Henry V	Henry V	Theatre for a New Audience	
1993	Much Ado About Nothing	Benedick	Queens Theatre	
1994	As You Like It	Touchstone	Theatre for a New Audience	
1994	True West	Lee/Austin	Donmar Warehouse	
1995	Macbeth	Macbeth	Greenwich Theatre	
2000	Life x 3	Henry	Royal National Theatre	
2003	Twelfth Night	Olivia	Chicago Shakespeare Theater	
2007	I am Shakespeare	Frank	UK tour	
2007	Boeing Boeing	Robert	Comedy Theatre	
2008	Boeing Boeing	Robert	Longacre Theatre	
2008	Peer Gynt	Peer Gynt	Guthrie Theater	
2009	Endgame	Hamm	Duchess Theatre	
2009	Jerusalem	Johnny Byron	Royal Court Theatre	
2010	Jerusalem	Johnny Byron	Apollo Theatre	
2010	La Bete	Valere	Comedy Theatre	
2010–11	La Bete	Valere	Music Box Theatre	
2011	Jerusalem	Johnny Byron	Music Box Theatre	
2011–12	Jerusalem	Johnny Byron	Apollo Theatre	
2012–13	Richard III and Twelfth Night	Richard III / Olivia	Apollo Theatre / Repertory	
2013	Nice Fish	Ron	Guthrie Theater	
2013–14	Richard III and Twelfth Night	Richard III / Olivia	Belasco Theatre / Repertory	
2015	Farinelli and the King	Philip V of Spain	Sam Wanamaker Playhouse	
2015	Farinelli and the King	Philip V of Spain	Duke of York's Theatre	
2016	Nice Fish	Ron	American Repertory Theater	
2016	Nice Fish	Ron	St. Ann's Warehouse	
2016–17	Nice Fish	Ron	Harold Pinter Theatre	
2017–18	Farinelli and the King	Philip V of Spain	Belasco Theatre	
2019	Shakespeare within the Abbey	Richard III	Royal Shakespeare Company	
2022	Jerusalem	Johnny Byron	Apollo Theatre	
2022	Dr Semmelweis	Ignaz Semmelweis	Bristol Old Vic	
2023	Dr Semmelweis	Ignaz Semmelweis	Harold Pinter Theatre	
2024	Juno and the Paycock	Captain Jack Boyle	Gielgud Theatre	
2026	Tartuffe (Remixed)	Pastor Blake	Marylebone Theatre	

==== Shakespeare's Globe ====
Along with Rylance's above stage performances, he has also appeared often at the Shakespeare's Globe in London.

Year	Title	Role	Notes
1996	The Two Gentlemen of Verona	Proteus	
1997	A Chaste Maid in Cheapside	Mr. Allwit	
1997	Henry V	Henry V	
1998	The Merchant of Venice	Bassanio	
1998	The Honest Whore	Hippolito	
1999	Antony and Cleopatra	Cleopatra	
2000	Hamlet	Hamlet	
2001	Cymbeline	Cloten	
2002	The Golden Ass	Lucius	
2002	Twelfth Night	Olivia	
2003	Richard II	Richard II	
2004	Measure for Measure	Duke Vincentio	
2005	The Tempest	Prospero; Stephano; Sebastian; Alonso	
2005	The Storm	Daemones; Labrax; The Weather	
2012	Richard III	Richard III	
2012	Twelfth Night	Olivia	
2018	Othello	Iago	
