= List of awards and nominations received by Mark Rylance =

Mark Rylance awards and nominations
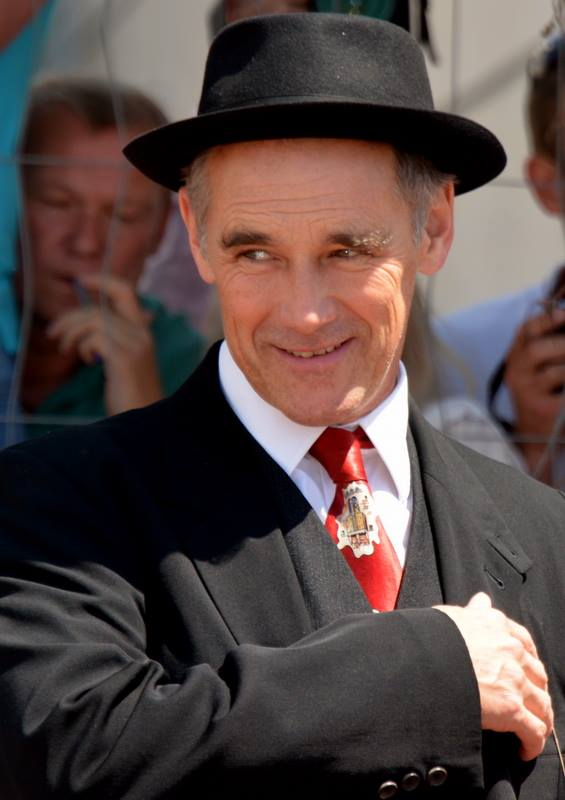
- Rylance at the 2016 Cannes Film Festival
Awards and nominations
Award	Wins	Nominations
Academy Awards	1	1
BAFTA Film Awards	1	1
BAFTA TV Awards	2	2
Golden Globe Awards	0	2
Laurence Olivier Awards	2	8
Primetime Emmy Awards	0	1
Screen Actors Guild Awards	1	3
Tony Awards	3	5

Totals (Note: Certain award groups do not simply award one winner. They acknowledge several different recipients, have runners-up, and have third place. Since this is a specific recognition and is different from losing an award, runner-up mentions are considered wins in this award tally. For simplification and to avoid errors, each award in this list has been presumed to have had a prior nomination.)
- Wins: 23
- Nominations: 48

The following is a list of awards and nominations received by the English actor, playwright and theatre director Mark Rylance.

Over his career Rylance gained acclaim for his roles on stage and screen and has received numerous accolades including an Academy Award, three BAFTA Awards, two Laurence Olivier Awards, three Tony Awards, and a Screen Actors Guild Awards.

On the West End, he received two Laurence Olivier Awards for his roles in Much Ado About Nothing (1994), and Jerusalem (2010). He was Olivier-nominated for his roles in Arden of Faversham (1983), Twelfth Night (2003), Boeing-Boeing (2008), La Bête (2011), and Farinelli and the King (2016). On Broadway, he received three Tony Awards, two for Best Actor in a Play Boeing-Boeing (2008), and Jerusalem (2011), and for Best Featured Actor in a Play for Twelfth Night (2014). He was Tony-nominated for Richard III (2014) and Farinelli and the King (2018).

On film he received the Academy Award for Best Supporting Actor and the BAFTA Award for Best Actor in a Supporting Role for his portrayal of Rudolf Abel in Steven Spielberg's historical drama Bridge of Spies (2015). He won the Screen Actors Guild Award for Outstanding Cast in a Motion Picture for The Trial of the Chicago 7 (2020). For his work on television portraying Thomas Cromwell in the BBC miniseries Wolf Hall (2015) he won the British Academy Television Award for Best Actor and was nominated for the Golden Globe Award and Screen Actors Guild Award.

== Major associations ==
=== Academy Awards ===
Year	Category	Nominated work	Result	Ref.
2015	Best Supporting Actor	Bridge of Spies	Won	

=== BAFTA Awards ===
Year	Category	Nominated work	Result	Ref.
British Academy Film Awards
2015	Best Actor in a Supporting Role	Bridge of Spies	Won	
British Academy Television Awards
2005	Best Actor	The Government Inspector	Won	
2015	Best Actor	Wolf Hall	Won	

=== Golden Globe Awards ===
Year	Category	Nominated work	Result	Ref.
2015	Best Supporting Actor – Motion Picture	Bridge of Spies	Nominated	
2015	Best Actor - Miniseries or Television Film	Wolf Hall	Nominated	

=== Emmy Awards ===
Year	Category	Nominated work	Result	Ref.
Primetime Emmy Awards
2015	Outstanding Lead Actor in a Limited Series or a Movie	Wolf Hall	Nominated	

=== Laurence Olivier Awards ===
Year	Category	Nominated work	Result	Ref.
1983	Best Actor in a Supporting Role	Arden of Faversham	Nominated	
1994	Best Actor	Much Ado About Nothing	Won	
2003	Best Actor	Twelfth Night	Nominated	
2008	Best Actor	Boeing-Boeing	Nominated	
2010	Best Actor	Jerusalem	Won	
2011	Best Actor	La Bête	Nominated	
2013	Best Actor	Twelfth Night	Nominated	
2016	Best Actor	Farinelli and the King	Nominated	

=== Screen Actors Guild Awards ===
Year	Category	Nominated work	Result	Ref.
2015	Outstanding Actor in a Supporting Role	Bridge of Spies	Nominated	
2015	Outstanding Actor in a Miniseries or TV Movie	Wolf Hall	Nominated	
2020	Outstanding Cast in a Motion Picture	The Trial of the Chicago 7	Won	
2021	Outstanding Cast in a Motion Picture	Don't Look Up	Nominated	

=== Tony Awards ===
Year	Category	Nominated work	Result	Ref.
2008	Best Leading Actor in a Play	Boeing-Boeing	Won	
2011	Best Leading Actor in a Play	Jerusalem	Won	
2014	Best Leading Actor in a Play	Richard III	Nominated	
2014	Best Featured Actor in a Play	Twelfth Night	Won	
2018	Best Leading Actor in a Play	Farinelli and the King	Nominated	

== Other awards and nominations ==
=== AACTA International Awards ===
Year	Nominated work	Category	Result	Ref(s)
2015	Bridge of Spies	Best International Supporting Actor in a Film – Cinema	Won	
2020	The Trial of the Chicago 7	Best International Supporting Actor in a Film – Cinema	Nominated	

=== BBC Radio Times Award ===
Year	Nominated work	Category	Result	Ref(s)
1991	The Grass Arena	Best Newcomer	Won	

=== Blank Check Awards ===
Year	Nominated work	Category	Result	Ref(s)
2022	The Outfit / Bones and All	Putters and Murmurs Award	Won	

=== Boston Society of Film Critics ===
Year	Nominated work	Category	Result	Ref(s)
2015	Bridge of Spies	Best Supporting Actor	Won	

=== Chicago Film Critics Association ===
Year	Nominated work	Category	Result	Ref(s)
2015	Bridge of Spies	Best Supporting Actor	Nominated	

=== Critics' Choice Awards ===
Year	Nominated work	Category	Result	Ref(s)
Critics' Choice Movie Awards
2015	Bridge of Spies	Best Supporting Actor	Nominated	
2020	The Trial of the Chicago 7	Best Acting Ensemble	Won	
Critics' Choice Television Awards
2015	Wolf Hall	Best Actor in a Movie/Miniseries	Nominated	

=== Critics' Circle Theatre Awards ===
Year	Nominated work	Category	Result	Ref(s)
2009	Jerusalem by Jez Butterworth	Best Actor	Won	

=== Florida Film Critics Circle ===
Year	Nominated work	Category	Result	Ref(s)
2015	Bridge of Spies	Best Supporting Actor	Nominated	

=== Houston Film Critics Society ===
Year	Nominated work	Category	Result	Ref(s)
2015	Bridge of Spies	Best Supporting Actor	Nominated	

=== Independent Spirit Awards ===
Year	Nominated work	Category	Result	Ref(s)
2023	Bones and All	Best Supporting Performance	Nominated	

=== Indiana Film Journalists Association ===
Year	Nominated work	Category	Result	Ref(s)
2015	Bridge of Spies	Best Supporting Actor	Nominated	

=== Kansas City Film Critics Circle ===
Year	Nominated work	Category	Result	Ref(s)
2015	Bridge of Spies	Best Supporting Actor	Nominated	

=== London Film Critics' Circle ===
Year	Nominated work	Category	Result	Ref(s)
2015	Bridge of Spies	Supporting Actor of the Year	Won	

=== National Society of Film Critics ===
Year	Nominated work	Category	Result	Ref(s)
2015	Bridge of Spies	Best Supporting Actor	Won	

=== New York Film Critics Circle ===
Year	Nominated work	Category	Result	Ref(s)
2015	Bridge of Spies	Best Supporting Actor	Won	

=== New York Film Critics Online ===
Year	Nominated work	Category	Result	Ref(s)
2015	Bridge of Spies	Best Supporting Actor	Won	

=== Olivier Critics Award ===
Year	Nominated work	Category	Result	Ref(s)
2002	Twelfth Night	—N/a	Won	

=== Online Film Critics Society ===
Year	Nominated work	Category	Result	Ref(s)
2015	Bridge of Spies	Best Supporting Actor	Nominated	

=== Satellite Awards ===
Year	Nominated work	Category	Result	Ref(s)
2015	Wolf Hall	Best Actor in a Miniseries or Motion Picture Made for TV	Won	

=== Toronto Film Critics Association ===
Year	Nominated work	Category	Result	Ref(s)
2015	Bridge of Spies	Best Supporting Actor	Won	

=== Vancouver Film Critics Circle ===
Year	Nominated work	Category	Result	Ref(s)
2015	Bridge of Spies	Best Supporting Actor	Won	

=== Washington D.C. Area Film Critics Association ===
Year	Nominated work	Category	Result	Ref(s)
2015	Bridge of Spies	Best Supporting Actor	Nominated	
