= Mark Rylance =

English actor, playwright and theatre director (born 1960)

Sir Mark Rylance
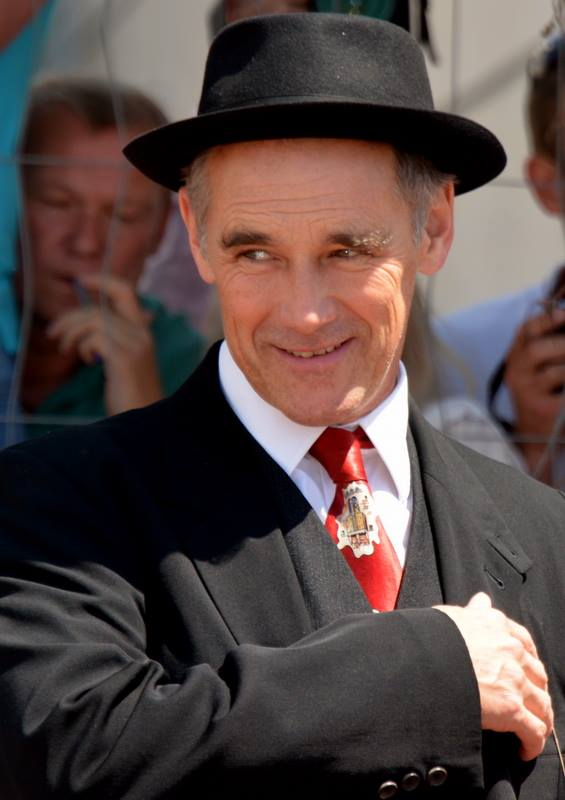
- Rylance promoting The BFG at the 2016 Cannes Film Festival
- Born: David Mark Rylance Waters; 18 January 1960 (age 66); Ashford, Kent, England
- Education: Royal Academy of Dramatic Art
- Occupations: Actor; playwright; theatre director
- Years active: 1980–present
- Works: Full list
- Spouse: Claire van Kampen (m. 1989; died 2025)
- Relatives: Susannah Waters (sister); Juliet Rylance (stepdaughter)
- Awards: Full list
- Rylance's voice recorded 2012, as part of an audio description of the Globe Theatre for VocalEyes

Sir David Mark Rylance Waters (Note: /raɪləns/) (born 18 January 1960) is an English actor, playwright and theatre director. Known for his work on stage and screen, he has received numerous awards including an Oscar, three BAFTAs, two Oliviers and three Tony Awards. In 2016 he was included in the Time 100 list of the world's most influential people. In 2017 he was made a knight by Queen Elizabeth II.

Between 1995 and 2005 Rylance was the first artistic director of Shakespeare's Globe in London. He appeared in the West End productions of Much Ado About Nothing in 1994 and Jerusalem in 2010, winning the Olivier Award for Best Actor for both. He has also appeared on Broadway, winning three Tony Awards: two for Best Actor for Boeing Boeing in 2008 and Jerusalem in 2011, and one for Best Featured Actor for Twelfth Night in 2014. He was Tony-nominated for his roles in Richard III in 2014 and Farinelli and the King in 2017.

On film, Rylance portrayed Rudolph Abel in Steven Spielberg's historical drama Bridge of Spies (2015), for which he won the Academy Award for Best Supporting Actor. Rylance subsequently collaborated with Spielberg, acting in The BFG (2016) and Ready Player One (2018). Rylance also appeared in The Other Boleyn Girl (2008), Dunkirk (2017), The Trial of the Chicago 7 (2020), Bones and All (2022), The Outfit (2022) and Artificial (2026).

On television, Rylance won the British Academy Television Award for Best Actor for his role as David Kelly in the 2005 Channel 4 drama The Government Inspector and for playing Thomas Cromwell in the 2015 BBC Two mini-series Wolf Hall; for the latter role, he received Emmy Award and Golden Globe Award nominations. He completed his portrayal of Cromwell in the 2024 sequel Wolf Hall: The Mirror and the Light.

Rylance is a patron of the London International Festival of Theatre; of the London-based charity Peace Direct, which supports peace-builders in areas of conflict; and of the Stop the War Coalition.

== Early life and education ==
Rylance was born as David Mark Waters on 18 January 1960 in Ashford, Kent, to David and Anne (née Skinner) Waters, both teachers. One of his grandmothers was Irish. Both of his grandfathers were British POWs of the Japanese in the Second World War. His maternal grandfather, Osmond Skinner, spent decades as a banker with the Hong Kong and Shanghai Bank. After being shot in the stomach during the Battle of Hong Kong, Skinner was recuperating when he witnessed the St. Stephen's College massacre.

Rylance's family moved to the US in 1969, where his parents taught English at the University School of Milwaukee. Rylance attended the school until his graduation in 1978, when he returned to England. He has a sister named Susannah, an opera singer and author, and a deceased brother, Jonathan, who was a sommelier at Chez Panisse.

When in Milwaukee, acting mentor Dale Gutzman cast Rylance in a variety of roles before he relocated to London to train at the Royal Academy of Dramatic Art (RADA) from 1978 to 1980. Due to his time in Wisconsin, Rylance had developed an American accent, claiming, "when I arrived in London at RADA, I was treated as the American". He took the stage name of Mark Rylance because his given name, Mark Waters, was already taken by someone else registered with Equity.

== Career ==
=== 1980–1999: Beginnings in the West End ===
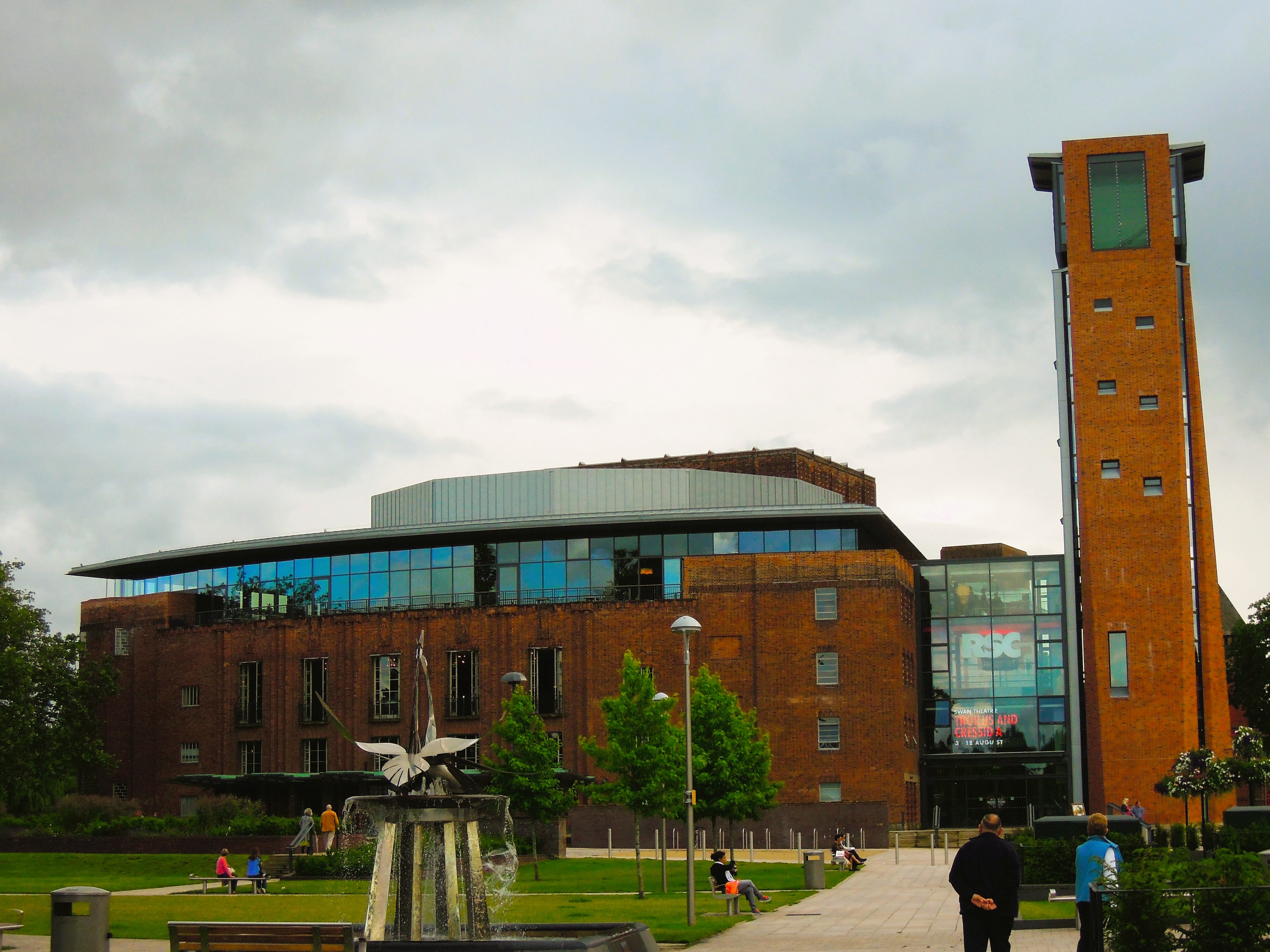
Rylance started his career acting in numerous productions with the Royal Shakespeare Company

In 1980 Rylance gained his professional acting debut in the Shaun Lawton play Desperado Corner at the Glasgow Citizens' Theatre, where he acted in a variety of plays as well as organising his own experimental theatre group.

In 1982 and 1983 he performed in numerous productions at the Royal Shakespeare Company (RSC) in Stratford-upon-Avon and London. During this time he acted in productions of The Taming of the Shrew, The Tempest and A Midsummer Night's Dream. He received his first Laurence Olivier Award nomination in the Best Supporting Actor in a Play category for his portrayal of Michael in Arden of Faversham at the 1983 Laurence Olivier Awards. In 1988 Rylance played Hamlet with the RSC in Ron Daniels' production that toured Ireland and Britain for a year. The play then ran in Stratford-upon-Avon. Hamlet toured the US for two years. In 1990 Rylance and Claire van Kampen (later his wife) founded "Phoebus' Cart", their own theatre company. The following year, the company staged The Tempest on the road.

In 1995 Rylance became the first artistic director of Shakespeare's Globe Theatre, a post he held until 2005. Rylance directed and acted in every season, in works by Shakespeare and others, including an all-male production of Twelfth Night, in which he played Olivia, and Richard III in the title role. Under his directorate, new plays were also performed at the Globe, the first being Augustine's Oak (referring to Augustine of Canterbury and Christianisation of Anglo-Saxon England) by Peter Oswald, the writer-in-residence, which was performed in 1999. A second play by Oswald followed in 2002: The Golden Ass or the Curious Man.

Rylance played the lead in Gillies MacKinnon's film The Grass Arena (1991), and won the Radio Times Award for Best Newcomer. In 1993 he starred in Matthew Warchus' production of Much Ado About Nothing at the Queen's Theatre, produced by Thelma Holt. His Benedick won him an Olivier Award for Best Actor.

=== 2000–2009: Broadway debut and acclaim ===
Rylance has acted in numerous plays of William Shakespeare

For his role as Jay in Intimacy (2001), directed by Patrice Chéreau, he received real, rather than simulated, fellatio. He took the leading role as British weapons expert David Kelly in Peter Kosminsky's The Government Inspector (2005), an award-winning Channel 4 production for which he won the British Academy Television Award for Best Actor in 2005. That same year, Oswald's third play written for the Globe was first performed: The Storm, an adaptation of Plautus's comedy Rudens (The Rope) – "argu[ably]" one of the sources of Shakespeare's The Tempest. Other historical first nights were organised by Rylance while director of the Globe including Twelfth Night performed in 2002 at Middle Temple, to commemorate its first performance there exactly 400 years before, and Measure for Measure at Hampton Court in summer 2004. In 2007 he received a Sam Wanamaker Award together with his wife Claire van Kampen, Director of Music, and Jenny Tiramani, Director of Costume Design, for the founding work during the opening ten years at Shakespeare's Globe.

In 2007 Rylance wrote (co-conceived by John Dove) and starred in The BIG Secret Live 'I am Shakespeare' Webcam Daytime Chatroom Show (A comedy of Shakespearean identity crisis), which toured England in 2007. On 8 September 2007 Derek Jacobi and Rylance unveiled a Declaration of Reasonable Doubt on the authorship of William Shakespeare's work, after the final matinée performance of The Big Secret Live "I am Shakespeare" Webcam Daytime Chat-Room Show in Chichester. The actual author of Shakespeare's plays is variously proposed to be Christopher Marlowe; Francis Bacon; Edward de Vere, 17th Earl of Oxford; or Mary Sidney (Mary Sidney Herbert, Countess of Pembroke). The declaration named 20 prominent doubters of the past, including Mark Twain, John Gielgud, Charlie Chaplin and actor Leslie Howard (later withdrawn from the list), and was made by the Shakespeare Authorship Coalition duly signed online by 300 people to begin new research. Jacobi and Rylance presented a copy of the document to William Leahy, head of English at Brunel University London.

In 2016 the writer Ben Elton delivered a riposte to this "batty" premise in the episode "If You Prick Us, Do We Not Bleed" of his television comedy Upstart Crow. The great but "self-regarding and pretentious" actor Wolf Hall (played by Ben Miller) joins Burbage's acting company to play Shylock. The character Wolf Hall confronts Shakespeare (played by David Mitchell) with the suggestion that he didn't write his own plays; it is a satirical portrait of Rylance and his opinion.

In 2007 Rylance performed in Boeing-Boeing in London. In 2008 he reprised the role on Broadway and won Drama Desk and Tony Awards for his performance. In 2009 Rylance won the Critics' Circle Theatre Award Best Actor, 2009 for his role of Johnny Byron in Jez Butterworth's play Jerusalem at the Royal Court Theatre in London.

=== 2010–2019: Career expansion ===
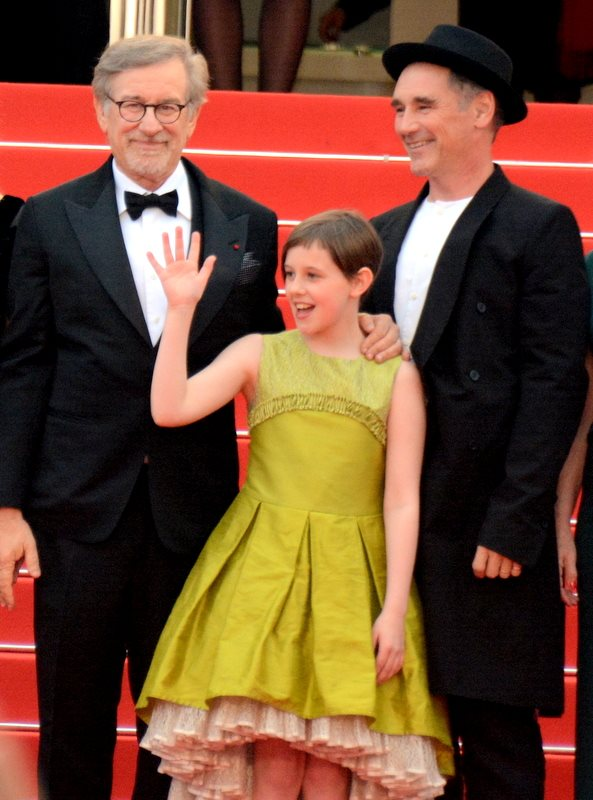
Rylance with Steven Spielberg and co-star Ruby Barnhill in 2016

In 2010 Rylance starred in a revival of David Hirson's verse play La Bête. The play ran first at London's Comedy Theatre before transferring to the Music Box Theatre on Broadway, on 23 September 2010. Also in 2010 he won another Olivier award for best actor in the role of Johnny Byron in Jerusalem at the Apollo Theatre in London. In 2011 he won his second Tony Award for playing the same role in the Broadway production. In 2013 Shakespeare's Globe brought two all-male productions to Broadway, starring Rylance as Olivia in Twelfth Night and in the title role in Richard III, for a limited run in repertory. He won his third Tony Award for his performance as Olivia and was nominated for his performance as Richard III, becoming the sixth person in Tony Award history to receive two acting nominations in the same season.

He played Thomas Cromwell in Wolf Hall (2015), BBC Two's adaptation of Hilary Mantel's historical novels Wolf Hall and Bring Up the Bodies. For his performance, he was nominated for numerous accolades including the Primetime Emmy Award for Outstanding Lead Actor in a Miniseries or a Movie, the Golden Globe Award for Best Actor – Miniseries or Television Film and the Screen Actors Guild Award for Outstanding Performance by a Male Actor in a Miniseries or Television Movie. Rylance was featured as the castaway on the BBC radio programme Desert Island Discs on 15 February 2015.

Rylance co-starred in the biographical drama Bridge of Spies, released in October 2015, directed by Steven Spielberg and starring Tom Hanks, Amy Ryan and Alan Alda. The film is about the 1960 U-2 Incident and the arrest and conviction of Soviet spy Rudolf Abel and the exchange of Abel for U-2 pilot Gary Powers. Rylance, who had previously turned down a role offered by Spielberg in the 1987 film Empire of the Sun, plays Abel and has received unanimous universal acclaim for his performance, with many critics claiming it as the best performance of 2015. The St. Louis Post-Dispatch quoted, "As the deeply principled Donovan, Hanks deftly balances earnestness and humour. And Rylance's spirited performance is almost certain to yield an Oscar nomination." David Edelstein from New York cited 'It's Rylance who keeps Bridge of Spies standing. He gives a teeny, witty, fabulously non-emotive performance, every line musical and slightly ironic – the irony being his forthright refusal to deceive in a world founded on lies." Rylance won the Academy Award, BAFTA Award and New York Film Critics Circle Award in the Best Supporting Actor categories, as well as receiving Golden Globe Award and Actor Award nominations, among other wins and nominations.

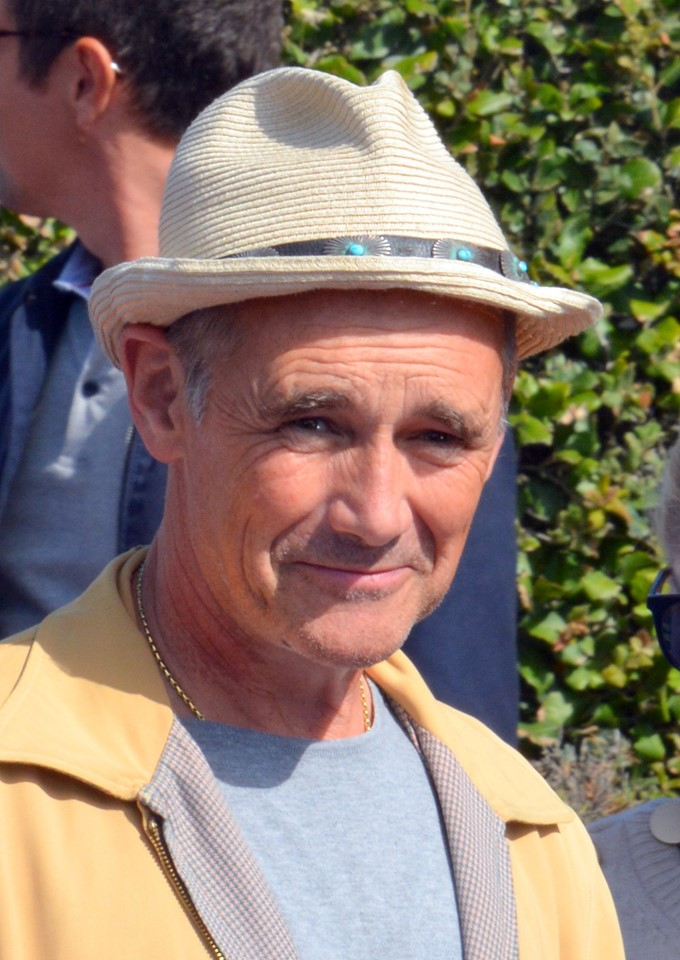
Rylance at the Deauville American Film Festival in 2019

Rylance co-wrote and starred in the comedy play Nice Fish, the first version of which premiered at the Guthrie Theater in Minneapolis in 2013, then underwent substantial revision. On 17 January 2016, the revised play received its premiere production at the American Repertory Theater in Cambridge, Massachusetts, which then transferred to St. Ann's Warehouse, New York. In November 2016, the production opened at the Harold Pinter Theatre in London's West End.

Rylance played the title role in Spielberg's The BFG, a film adaptation of the children's book by Roald Dahl. Filming took place in 2015 and the film was released in July 2016. Rylance had a major role in Christopher Nolan's 2017 action-thriller Dunkirk, based on the British military evacuation of the French city of Dunkirk in 1940 during the Second World War. The film co-starred Tom Hardy, Kenneth Branagh, Cillian Murphy and Harry Styles. In 2018 Rylance made his third collaboration with Spielberg acting playing James Halliday in the science-fiction epic film Ready Player One. That same year Rylance starred in Farinelli and the King on the Broadway stage earning a Tony Award for Best Actor in a Play, his fifth career Tony Award nomination. Later that year 2018, he appeared in Waiting for the Barbarians, alongside Johnny Depp and Robert Pattinson. In June 2019, he resigned from the Royal Shakespeare Company due to its sponsorship deal with BP. He last appeared on stage for the RSC in 1989.

=== 2020–present ===
On 8 September 2019 Rylance revealed to AlloCiné that he was cast to play Satan in the American filmmaker Terrence Malick's upcoming film The Last Planet (since renamed The Way of the Wind). In 2020 Rylance appeared in Aaron Sorkin's legal drama The Trial of the Chicago 7 which premiered on Netflix. He portrayed William Kunstler, defence counsel, co-founder of the Center for Constitutional Rights, board member of the American Civil Liberties Union and active member of the National Lawyers Guild. The film was nominated for six Academy Awards.

In the 2021 American political satire and science fiction film Don't Look Up, directed by Adam McKay, Rylance portrayed Peter Isherwell, a fictional eccentric billionaire CEO of tech company BASH and top supporter of President Janie Orlean. Delayed by the COVID-19 pandemic, Dr Semmelweis, a new play, based on the life of Ignaz Semmelweis, written by Stephen Brown and Rylance, completed an extended run at the Bristol Old Vic in January and February 2022. Rylance played the lead role of Dr Semmelweis throughout the run in Bristol. In 2022 Rylance appeared in The Outfit, an American crime drama thriller film directed by Graham Moore (his directorial debut), as an English tailor, or, as he prefers to be called, a "cutter", in Chicago whose main clients are a family of gangsters. In the same year, he appeared in the Luca Guadagnino-directed horror film Bones & All, which premiered at the 79th Venice International Film Festival on 2 September 2022, and Inland, a British drama directed by Fridtjof Ryder in his directorial debut. In 2023 Rylance once again took the lead role in Dr Semmelweis as it transferred to the Harold Pinter Theatre in London's West End. For BBC television he concluded his earlier portrayal of Cromwell by taking the leading role in Wolf Hall: The Mirror and the Light (2024), the drama series adaptation of the final novel in Hilary Mantel's Tudor trilogy. In 2024 he also starred opposite J. Smith-Cameron in the West End revival of Juno and the Paycock at the Gielgud Theatre. He serves as a patron for the Bristol-based dance theatre company Impermanence, located at The Mount Without. He also serves as a patron of The Actor's Lounge, a part-time acting school for adults with 24 locations across the United Kingdom.

== Personal life ==
=== Marriage and family ===
In 1989 Rylance married the composer and playwright Claire van Kampen, whom he met in 1987 while working on a production of The Wandering Jew at the National Theatre. They were married in Oxfordshire. Through this marriage, he became a stepfather to her two daughters from a previous marriage, actress Juliet Rylance and filmmaker Nataasha van Kampen. Nataasha died in July 2012 at the age of 28, following which Rylance withdrew from his planned participation in the 2012 Summer Olympics opening ceremony in London and was replaced by Kenneth Branagh. Claire van Kampen died from cancer in 2025.

Rylance's brother, Jonathan Waters, died in May 2022 following a collision with a vehicle while cycling.

=== Charity and activism ===
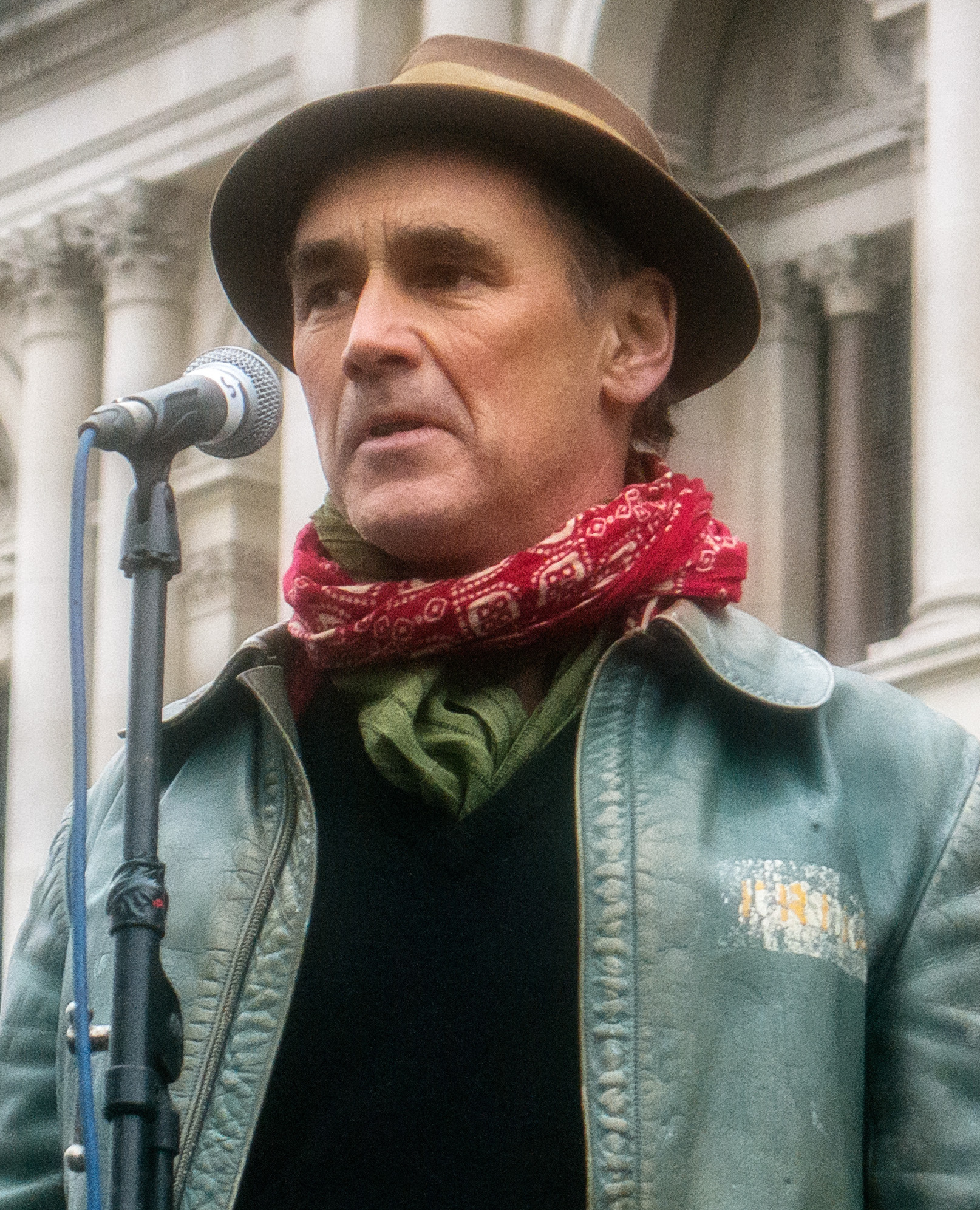
Rylance speaking at a rally of the Stop the War Coalition against the war in Syria in London in 2015

Rylance became a patron of LIFT (London International Festival of Theatre) in 2013. He said about the festival: "I feel LIFT has done more to influence the growth and adventure of English theatre than any other organisation we have." Rylance became patron of the London Bubble Speech Bubbles project in 2015. "I found a voice through making theatre and am proud to be the patron of Speech Bubbles, which helps hundreds of children to do the same."

Rylance has been a supporter of the indigenous rights organisation Survival International for many years. He is the creator and director of "We Are One", a fundraiser that took place at the Apollo Theatre in April 2010. The evening was a performance of tribal prose and poetry. Rylance is a patron of the London-based charity Peace Direct, which supports grassroots peacebuilders in areas of conflict, and of the Stop the War Coalition. He is a member of the Peace Pledge Union, a network of pacifists in the UK. He performed the life and words of Henri, a man living in war-torn eastern Congo, during a presentation in New York City in 2011. He is also patron of The Outside Edge Theatre Company. It works from the perspective of creating theatre and drama with people affected by substance abuse. It provides theatre interventions in drug and alcohol treatment and general community facilities throughout Britain, as well as producing professional public theatre productions that take place in theatres, studio theatres and art centres.

Rylance supports the Boycott, Divestment and Sanctions organisation against Israel. Rylance has long been an enthusiastic supporter of Conscience: Taxes for Peace not War, which works to change British tax law to allow conscientious objectors the right to redirect that portion of their taxes which would usually go to the military into non-violent methods of conflict resolution. In November 2019, along with other public figures, Rylance signed a letter supporting Labour Party leader Jeremy Corbyn describing him as "a beacon of hope in the struggle against emergent far-right nationalism, xenophobia and racism in much of the democratic world" and endorsed him in the 2019 UK general election. In December 2019, along with 42 other leading cultural figures, he signed a letter endorsing the Labour Party under Corbyn's leadership in the 2019 United Kingdom general election. The letter stated that "Labour's election manifesto under Jeremy Corbyn's leadership offers a transformative plan that prioritises the needs of people and the planet over private profit and the vested interests of a few."

In 2019 he cut ties with the Royal Shakespeare Company due to its sponsorship by BP stating, "I came to the incontrovertible conclusion that BP is neither sincere nor serious in addressing the climate crisis." He has supported making ecocide a crime at the International Criminal Court, saying, "I believe that ecocide law is very much needed and inevitably on its way. It will be an important step towards a deep connection with Nature. It will provide the moral impetus to change 'business as usual' and lead us towards a true humble love for our home, the Earth."

=== Interests ===
Rylance has expressed much interest in crop circles and bonded with King Charles III over them. He rejects criticism of his views:

But I've met Prince Charles a number of times now – because he's a great lover of Shakespeare – and I think he's a very conscious person and a good influence. ... Partly, in the end, I felt that because I have an interest in a number of subjects that people try to write off, like Shakespeare's authorship or crop circles – they say I'm insane or not mentally stable – that somehow, a knighthood makes it a little less easy to write me off.

Rylance has cited Art Carney and Robert Mitchum as favourite actors and the 1975 Akira Kurosawa film Dersu Uzala as his favourite film.

== Acting credits and accolades ==
At the 88th Academy Awards, Rylance won the Academy Award for Best Supporting Actor for his portrayal of Rudolf Abel in Bridge of Spies, in addition to winning BAFTA in the same category. He has received three Tony Awards (2008, 2011, 2014), making him one of only eight actors with two Lead Actor in a Play wins, while his nominations for Richard III and Twelfth Night in 2014 make him one of only six to be nominated in two acting categories in the same year.

In 2016 he was included in the Time 100 list of the world's most influential people. Rylance was created a Knight Bachelor in the 2017 New Year Honours for services to theatre.

== Bibliography ==
- Mark Rylance, Louis Jenkins. Nice Fish: a Play. Grove Press, 4 April 2017. ISBN 0-8021268-5-5.
- Mark Rylance. Play – A Recollection in Pictures and Words of the First Five Years of Play at Shakespeares's Globe Theatre. Photogr.: Sheila Burnett, Donald Cooper, Richard Kolina, John Tramper. Shakespeare's Globe Publ., London, UK. 2003. ISBN 0-9536480-4-4.
- The Wisdom of Shakespeare Series by Peter Dawkins (Foreword by Mark Rylance):
- The Wisdom of Shakespeare in As You Like It. I.C. Media Productions, 1998. Paperback. ISBN 0-9532890-1-X.
- The Wisdom of Shakespeare in The Merchant of Venice. I.C. Media Productions, 1998. Paperback. ISBN 0-9532890-0-1.
- The Wisdom of Shakespeare in Julius Caesar. I.C. Media Productions, 1999. Paperback. ISBN 0-9532890-2-8.
- The Wisdom of Shakespeare in The Tempest. I.C. Media Productions, 2000. Paperback. ISBN 0-9532890-3-6.
- The Wisdom of Shakespeare in Twelfth Night. I.C. Media Productions, 2002. Paperback. ISBN 0-9532890-4-4.
- Peter Dawkins. The Shakespeare Enigma (Foreword by Mark Rylance). Polair, UK. 2004. Illustrated paperback, 476pp. ISBN 0-9545389-4-3.
- John Abbott. Improvisation in Rehearsal (Foreword by Mark Rylance). Nick Hern Books, UK. 2009. Paperback, 256pp. ISBN 978-1-85459-523-2.
- Dave Patrick. The View Beyond: Sir Francis Bacon: Alchemy, Science, Mystery (The View Series) (Foreword by Mark Rylance, Ervin Lazslo, Rose Elliot). Deep Books, UK. 2011. Paperback, 288pp. ISBN 978-1-905398-22-5.

== See also ==
- List of Academy Award winners and nominees from Great Britain
- List of actors in Royal Shakespeare Company productions
- List of actors with Academy Award nominations
- List of British actors
- List of British playwrights since 1950
- List of Tony Award records
