= All You Need Is Death =

2023 Irish horror film by Paul Duane

- Film poster
- Directed by: Paul Duane
- Written by: Paul Duane
- Produced by: Paul Duane; Nick Franco (co-producer)
- Starring: Simone Collins; Charlie Maher
- Cinematography: Conor Rotherham
- Edited by: Eoin McDonagh
- Music by: Ian Lynch
- Distributed by: Blue Finch Films Releasing (UK); XYZ Films (U.S.)
- Release dates: 5 October 2023 (Beyond Fest); 11 April 2024 (U.S.); 19 April 2024 (Ireland and UK)
- Running time: 96 minutes
- Country: Ireland
- Languages: English; Old Irish
- Box office: USD$7,245 (UK)

All You Need Is Death is a 2023 Irish horror film, written and directed by Paul Duane in his dramatic feature debut. It concerns a pair of ethnomusicologists who unethically record a recital of an ancient song, thereby inciting the negative attentions of supernatural forces. It was made on a shoestring budget initially entirely funded by the director, and featured largely unknown actors with the exceptions of Olwen Fouéré and Gary Whelan.

All You Need Is Death was released in a series of film festivals beginning in October 2023, and had its general release in the United States, Ireland and the United Kingdom the following April before being made available on streaming services Shudder and Prime Video. The soundtrack, composed by Ian Lynch of Irish doom folk rock act Lankum, was met with acclaim. The film was generally well-received, with critics praising its premise and opening act, as well as Fouéré's performance, although some found the film less coherent as it progressed.

== Plot ==
Anna, a failed Irish folk singer, and her Eastern European boyfriend Aleks are travelling through rural Ireland to document obscure Irish folk songs and sell the recordings to collectors (unbeknownst to the singers). They become fascinated with a lead on an undocumented thousand-year-old folk song allegedly passed down from mother to daughter, and track down Rita Concannon, an elderly woman who can sing it. The song, in Old Irish, is about a king who is betrayed by the object of his romantic affections and then places a curse on her, her lover, and her descendants. Hearing and recording Rita's recital of the song causes the protagonists to become subject to sinister supernatural forces.

== Cast ==
- Anna – Simone Collins
- Aleks – Charlie Maher
- Agnes – Catherine Siggins
- Breezeblock Concannon – Nigel O'Neill
- Rita Concannon – Olwen Fouéré
- Ron Stowman – Barry McKiernan
- The Old Singer – Barry Gleeson
- The Wheelchair Man – David McDermott
- The Old King – Gary Whelan
- The Pub Singer – Sean Fitzgerald
- The Old Singer's Daughter – Róisín Barrett
- Aleksagnes/Emaciated Aleks – Benedict Stewardson
- The Middle-aged Man who Sings – Aidan Kavanagh
- Librarian – Katie Ryan
- The Cautious Man – Vinny Murphy
- The Prisoner – John Murry
- The Young Queen – Sarah Burns
- The Courtier – Sol Robinson
- The Chauffeur – Conor Stevens
- The High Priest – Aaron Nolan
- The Doctor – Wesley O'Duinn
- The Grand Vizier – Conor Courtney

== Production ==
Duane decided to make a low-budget horror film in June 2021 while in lockdown during the third wave of the COVID-19 pandemic in Ireland. He had previously worked in television and documentary film, notably directing the highly praised Barbaric Genius (2011) about writer and iconoclast John Healy, as well as several music-oriented documentaries. He decided to self-fund All You Need is Death after being frustrated at the lack of appreciation of original work shown by potential backers who asked which films his script was comparable to; one potential source of funding described the project as "weird and confusing", a quotation which Duane later had tattooed on his arm.

Although the production later attracted funding from Screen Ireland, many members of the production crew agreed to work for low fees or perform roles above their usual pay grade, and the film's post-production was completed on a deferred pay basis, Duane incurred significant debt in funding it. After its release, Duane expressed hope that if successful, the film would enable "other people taking chances and making weird fucked up movies, because the world needs more weird, fucked up movies". Duane has characterised the shoot, for which he requested "the grimmest, most dilapidated locations possible", as "pretty gruelling".

=== Music ===
My main guiding idea was to use traditional instruments in unusual ways to suggest something primal and chthonic. I often envisioned people living in pre-Christian Ireland getting a hold of these instruments somehow. I wondered about how they would make sense of them, how they would hold them, how they would use them and what sounds they would make to accompany their religious observances, their chants and their rituals.

— Composer Ian Lynch, interview with Hot Press, April 2024

Duane's impetus for writing the film came after watching a lot of folk horror such as Kill List, Haxan and The Wicker Man and wanting to centre folk music in the genre, telling one interviewer "I wanted to do something that I'd never seen anyone do before which was make a folk horror that accentuates the folk." The first person Duane sent his script to was musician Ian Lynch of Irish doom folk band Lankum. Although a stranger to the musician, Duane knew he possessed both a love for horror and a graduate literature degree in Irish folklore. Lynch agreed to write the soundtrack for the film (which was released in a limited edition vinyl), including the centrepiece Old Irish ballad, in his first foray of writing for the screen. The film's casting showcased members of contemporary Irish folk bands Lankum, The Mary Wallopers and The Deadlians.

== Release ==
All You Need Is Death premiered at Beyond Fest in Los Angeles on October 5, 2023. It had its Irish premiere at the Cork International Film Festival, where it was nominated for Best New Irish Feature Award, and also screened at the 56th Sitges Film Festival, FrightFest (as part of Glasgow Film Festival), Göteborg Film Festival, and Overlook Film Festival. Duane praised the film's distributors' choices of release locations, including New Orleans and Kansas City, cities with strong musical heritage.

The film had its theatrical release in the US by XYZ Films on 11 April 2024, and opened a week later in Irish and UK cinemas. Its 15-cinema week-long run in the UK, distributed by Blue Finch Films Releasing, grossed USD$7245. It was released on video-on-demand in the US in April, by August was streaming in Ireland on Prime Video, and on 7 September was made available on horror streaming service Shudder.

== Reception ==
On the review aggregator website Rotten Tomatoes, 88% of 24 critics' reviews are positive. Metacritic, which uses a weighted average, assigned the film a score of 67 out of 100, based on 6 critics, indicating "generally favorable" reviews. In a 2-star review for The Guardian, Peter Bradshaw praised the "interesting" and "subversive" allusions and ideas of the film's beginning and Fouéré's "striking" performance, but found the latter section of the film "simply too chaotic, strained and unfocused". For The Irish Times, Donald Clarke gave the film 4 stars, also noting a shift from the "lucid" and "linear" first half to a less ordered second half where not all the performances adapt to the looser tone. Although finding it "craggy and rough-edged", Clarke concluded that "the growing sense of being lost in a Celtic variation on Hieronymus Bosch is stirring in the most creatively disagreeable fashion" and heralded it as indicative of the future direction of Irish horror.

For The Daily Beast, Nick Shager hailed it as a masterpiece, singling out Fouéré's performance and Duane's "expert framing and equally adept sense of pace and mood" for praise. Paste's Andy Crump added to the praise of Fouéré: "[t]he power of Fouéré's performance echoes across the film to its gruesome, tragic ending." In Little White Lies, David Jenkins also found that the film "[d]idn't quite stick the landing" but praised it as "a grimly refreshing and confident toe-dip into the world of horror". Roger Luckhurst, in Sight and Sound, dissented from the criticism of the film's second half, asserting that "the horror festival circuit seems to have widely appreciated the film's wig-out finale". Luckhurst focused his praise on Lynch's soundtrack as the standout element of the film, eclipsing, for him, its budget-constrained visual effects.

The film has been featured in several "best of" lists of horror film. The British Film Institute selected it among its "10 great Irish horror films" in May 2025, with reviewer Anton Bitel remarking that "[t]here is a sophisticated reflexivity to the way that documentarian Duane's fictive oddity shows Irish folk culture being appropriated, exploited, repackaged and sold out – even in a film like this one – while still retaining something of its original dark magic and danger." It made horror website Bloody Disgusting's end of year list "Best of 2024: 10 Hidden Horror Gems You Might've Missed", in which Paul Lê concluded that the film is "so hauntingly told and grimly shot that it's almost begging you not to watch". The AV Club named it among the best horror films of the first half of 2024, with reviewer Matthew Jackson commenting that "[l]ike a great song, it's one of those movies that just worms its way into your head and lingers".
