= Alan Mehdizadeh =

English actor, agent (born 1982)

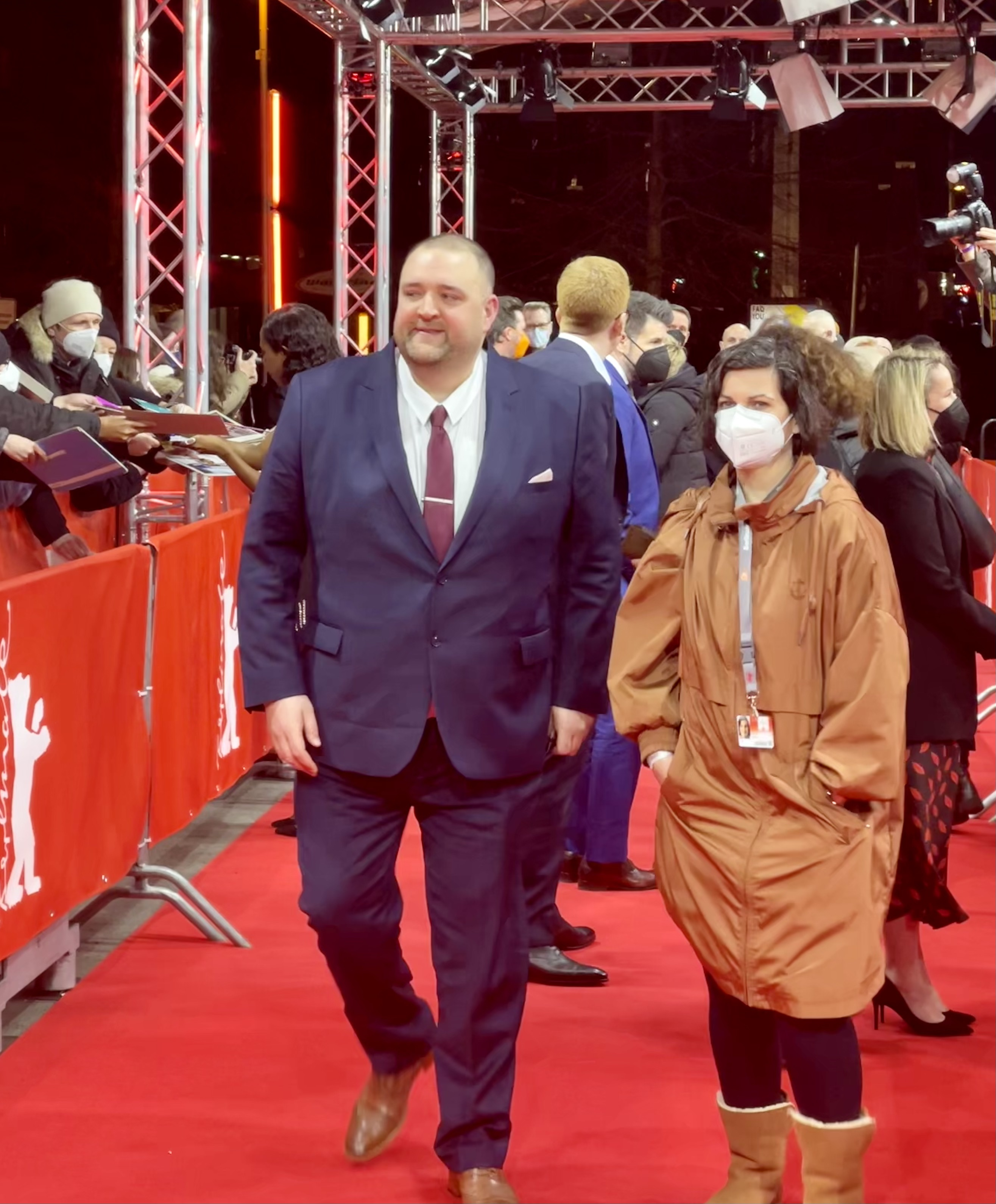
- Mehdizadeh at the 2022 Berlinale
- Born: 4 September 1982 (age 44); Hastings, England
- Occupations: Actor, agent
- Years active: 1990–present
- Children: 3

Alan Mehdizadeh (Persian: الان مهدیزاده; born 4 September 1982) is a British-Iranian actor, appearing on stage and screen. He notably played the role of Monk in Graham Moore's The Outfit, and the Harkonnen Weapon Master in Dune: Part Two opposite Austin Butler. He played the role of Don in the West End musical, Kinky Boots. He is also a talent agent, and runs London-based agency Avenue Agents.

== Early life ==
Alan Mehdizadeh was born in Hastings, East Sussex. His father is Iranian, and his mother is English. He is the eldest of 4 siblings.

His early career started at the Questors Theatre in Ealing, where he appeared in a youth production of 'Godspell', when he was 14. He then went on to perform at the Regent's Park Open Air Theatre in a production of 'Watership Down', where he played Cowslip. He also regularly appeared in popular BBC children's programme 'Grange Hill'.

== Education ==
Mehdizadeh graduated from the University of Wales, Aberystwyth in 2007 (where he read Drama).

Whilst studying, he also founded the long-running Curtain Call Musical Theatre Society. In 2016 the company celebrated its 10th birthday with a gala performance at which Mehdizadeh gave a speech, and sung.

Other educational institutions attended include Richmond Upon Thames College, and Drayton Manor High School. At high school he appeared in school shows with actors such as Adebayo Bolaji, Sian Clifford, and Anthony Welsh.

== Career ==
In 2012, he originated the roles of Dad and The MC in a stage adaptation of Oliver Jeffers' book The Incredible Book Eating Boy at the Belfast arts venue, The MAC.

Mehdizadeh played Big Davey in the West End musical Billy Elliot the Musical, (which he played for two years between May 2013 and May 2015). Mehdizadeh also appeared in the same role for both the worldwide live cinema release, and the subsequent DVD release of the show. Mehdizadeh further, played the role of Big Davey at the 10th anniversary gala performance in May 2015.

In 2016, Alan was appearing in the UK premiere production of Swap!, written and directed by TV star Ian Ogilvy. The play toured the UK. Alan played Harry "The Hammer" Henson alongside several TV personalities (including Kim Tiddy & Louisa Lytton).

As of 15 August 2016, Mehdizadeh joined the West End production of Kinky Boots in the role of Don. The hit musical recently won Best New Musical at the 2016 Olivier Awards, and continues to play at the Adelphi Theatre in London. Mehdizadeh left the production in June 2018.

In 2021 he appeared in the TV series Whitstable Pearl starring Kerry Godliman. His other recent TV credits include BBC series, The Outlaws (written and directed by Stephen Merchant), and The Power (for Amazon Prime).

Mehdizadeh played the role of Monk in the 2022 Graham Moore film The Outfit.

He is next due to appear in the much-anticipated blockbuster Dune: Part Two, season 2 of popular Star Wars spinoff Andor, upcoming Disney+ series Rivals, upcoming BBC comedy Undoing Martin Parker, and has recently voiced the role of Jilan on video game Diablo IV.

Mehdizadeh is also the founder, and artistic director of UK production company What Was That? Productions, with whom he has produced and appeared in many productions.
