= Princess Emmy =

2019 animated film by Piet De Rycker

- German theatrical release poster
- Directed by: Piet De Rycker
- Screenplay by: Sergio Casci
- Produced by: Hans Ulrich Stoef; Jörn Radel; Ken Anderson; Noel Swinnen; Thorsten Wegener
- Music by: Amaury Bernier
- Production companies: Studio 100 Film; Studio 100 Media; Talking Horse; Witbox; Red Kite Animation; Animation Fabrik
- Distributed by: Kaleidoscope Film Distribution (United Kingdom); Universum Film (Germany)
- Release dates: 28 March 2019 (Germany); 30 August 2019 (UK)
- Running time: 78 minutes
- Countries: Germany; United Kingdom; Belgium
- Languages: German; English
- Box office: $54,328

Princess Emmy (German: Prinzessin Emmy) is a 2019 German-British-Belgian animated fantasy film directed by Piet De Rycker from a screenplay by Sergio Casci. A co-production between Studio 100 Media, Talking Horse, Witbox, Red Kite Animation, and Animation Fabrik, the plot concerns Princess Emmy who possesses the magical power of talking to her pet horses.

== English voice cast ==
- Ruby Barnhill as Princess Emmy
- Bella Ramsey as Princess Gizana
- John Hannah as King Karl
- Franka Potente as Queen Karla
- Joel Fry as Caesar

== Production ==
Development for the film began in 2015, originally as a production between Studio 100 Film, the international film sales division of Studio 100 Media, and their in-house French animation unit Studio 100 Animation. British studio Red Kite Animation later replaced Studio 100 Animation in co-production role. Thorsten Wegener (Studio 100 Film), Ken Anderson (Red Kite Animation), and Hans Ulrich Stoef (Made 4 Entertainment) served as the film producers while Piet De Rycker served as the film's director. Patrick Elmendorff and Katell France were originally attached as a producers before their departure. German film production/distribution company Universum Film, who previously released Maya the Bee back in 2014, bought the rights to distribute the film in its home country.

=== Casting ===
An English voice cast of the film consists of Ruby Barnhill as Princess Emmy, Bella Ramsey as Gizanna, and Franka Potente as Queen Karla, a role that she would provide in the German-language version.

== Release and reception ==
Released in Germany on March 28, 2019, Princess Emmy was met with generally average to negative reviews from critics. The film was released in the UK on 30 August of the same year. Outside of Germany, the film grossed $54,328.
