= Red Kite Animation =

Scottish animation studio focused on digitally animated programming

- Industry: Computer animation Traditional animation
- Founded: 1997
- Founder: Ken Anderson; Rachel Bevan Baker
- Headquarters: Edinburgh, Scotland, U.K.,
- Products: Television animated series

Red Kite Animation is a British animation production company based in Edinburgh, Scotland. The studio was founded in 1997 by Ken Anderson and Rachel Bevan Baker. The company developed the television cartoons Dennis the Menace and Gnasher and Wendy, and more recently the feature films Princess Emmy.

== Filmography ==
=== Television series ===
==== 2000s ====
- IMP (2006)
- Dennis the Menace and Gnasher (2009–2013)

==== 2010s ====
- Marvo the Wonder Chicken (2010) (Co-produced with Jetix Europe)
- Ask Lara (2011-2012)
- Wendy (2013)

=== Feature films ===
- Princess Emmy (2019)
