= Paul Duane =

Irish writer and director

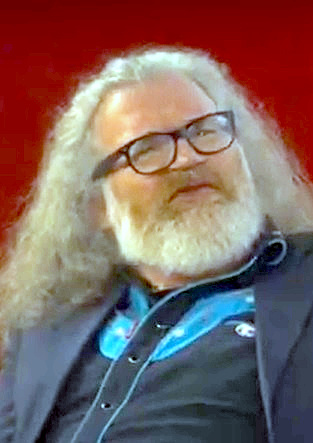
Paul Duane at diff 2024

Paul Duane is an Irish writer and director of television and film. His directing credits include Ballykissangel (1999), Casualty (2001), The Royal (2002), Small Potatoes (1999–2001), and Footballer's Wives (2003), Secret Diary of a Call Girl (2007–2011), Barbaric Genius (2011), Very Extremely Dangerous (2012), Natan (2013), Welcome to the Dark Ages (2019), and All You Need Is Death (2023).

== Career ==
Duane started his career directing episodes for television, credits include Ballykissangel (1999), Casualty (2001), The Royal (2002), Small Potatoes (1999-2001), and Footballer's Wives (2003).

He has also made several short films including LSD 73! (2003), based on an original script by the Irish novelist Patrick McCabe.

He co-created the ITV series Secret Diary of a Call Girl (2007–2011), based on the blog, Belle de Jour. The Irish production company Screenworks was established by Duane and Rob Cawley in 2008. Their first production, on the life of the London-Irish author John Healy, was Barbaric Genius (2011).

More recent films include Very Extremely Dangerous (2012), and Natan (2013), about the French producer Bernard Natan.

In December 2013 he was listed by Variety magazine as part of their yearly 10 Directors to Watch feature.

Welcome to the Dark Ages (2019), originally called What Time Is Death?, was described as "his long-gestated study of new activities by the men who used to be KLF". The documentary film charts Bill Drummond and Jimmy Cauty's Welcome to the Dark Ages 2017 festival in Liverpool, as well as their plan to build The People's Pyramid, a project to build a pyramid of hand-fired bricks, each containing the ashes of a dead person. The film featured at the 2019 Dublin International Film Festival.

Best Before Death (2019) is a documentary film about Drummond's 25 Paintings World Tour.

All You Need Is Death (2023), his first dramatic feature film, a folk-horror feature with soundtrack by Ian Lynch of Lankum, premiered October 2023 at Beyond Fest in Los Angeles.
