= IMP (TV series) =

- Genre: Comedy; Animation; Adventure
- Created by: Andy Fielding
- Voices of: Stephen Mangan; Julian Rhind-Tutt; Helen McAlpine; Gavin Mitchell
- Countries of origin: United Kingdom; Spain
- Original languages: English; Catalan; Spanish
- No. of seasons: 1
- No. of episodes: 65

Production
- Running time: 1 minute
- Production companies: Red Kite Animation; Screen 21

Original release
- Network: TVC (Spain); Channel 4 (UK)
- Release: 2006 – 2007

IMP is an animated television series created by Andy Fielding. The series was developed in black and white with a minimalist design, and was developed and produced by Red Kite Animation, with Screen 21 as co-producer. Distributed by BRB Internacional, it aired on TVC and consists of 65 episodes of 90 seconds each. IMP has been issued and aired worldwide including Cartoon Network, in which the series was part of Sunday Pants, Disney Channel Japan, and Antena 3 in Spain.

== Plot ==
The series takes place in the lair of "The Imp" (Stephen Mangan) and his surroundings. Though the Imp tries and declares himself to be the embodiment of pure evil, he is more childish and petty than truly diabolical, and though he tries to fill the world with sin and suffering, he is far too small and incompetent to make a good job of it.

Other characters in the show include Bob (Julian Rhind-Tutt), the rabbit-eared, highly competent, and rather sardonic caretaker of the lair; the moronic, twin monsters Philippe and Bertrand; a helpful Hand on wheels; Lumen, who, dressed in all white and determined to spread sweetness and light, is regarded by the IMP as his nemesis; the IMP's rival Cat-Thing, who continually seeks to destroy him (unsuccessfully); and the Big Boss (the devil himself, and actually once referred to as "Satan").

== Episodes ==
No.	Title	Original release date
1	"Frogs of War"	2006
The Imp lets loose a plague of frogs, with unpleasant results to himself.
2	"Who's Who"	TBA
The Imp shows Bob his place in an important reference work.
3	"Cuts"	TBA
The Big Boss explains shortages to the Imp.
4	"Teddy"	TBA
The Imp wonders why his Teddy has blown up at him.
5	"Girly"	TBA
The Imp is not pleased with Lumen's makeover of the lair.
6	"Phone"	TBA
The Imp has been making calls; the phone company demands that he pay.
7	"Rainy Day"	TBA
Bob suffers from a series of petty pranks.
8	"Personals"	TBA
The Imp has placed a personal ad in the paper; the effects are less than fortunate.
9	"Pets"	TBA
The Imp is asked to incubate a giant egg.
10	"Missiles"	TBA
The Imp is forced to give counseling to his minions.
11	"Security"	TBA
The Imp's new security directives entangle the Imp himself.
12	"Lasagna"	TBA
Bob serves the Imp EVIL Italian food.
13	"Spaniel"	TBA
The Imp unleashes a plague of less than Biblical proportions.
14	"Birthday"	TBA
The lair holds a party for Lumen.
15	"Journey"	TBA
The Imp and company set forth on a trip ... of EVIL.
16	"Piece of Cake"	TBA
The Imp bakes an EVIL confection.
17	"Silhouette"	TBA
The Imp poses in the moonlight.
18	"Sins"	TBA
The Imp tries to increase EVIL by devising some new sins.
19	"Bush"	TBA
The Imp is distracted by ambulatory shrubbery.
20	"Bison"	TBA
The Imp finds himself buffaloed.
21	"Tall"	TBA
The Imp rises to new heights.
22	"Evil Inventions"	TBA
The Imp summons his minions to display their devices of EVIL.
23	"Buzz"	TBA
Bob's experiment with mutation rates a solid Bee.
24	"Pirate"	TBA
The Imp's plans for piracy are sunk.
25	"Evil Pulpit"	TBA
The Imp is disturbed by Bob and Lumen's sunning themselves on his balcony.
26	"Lists"	TBA
The Imp makes much to-do about his list of not much to do.
27	"Trident"	TBA
The Imp's trident is stolen.
28	"Education"	TBA
The Imp plans to teach a course of EVIL.
29	"The Imp-Lement"	TBA
30	"Nature Trail"	TBA
The Imp demonstrates to Lumen that Nature is cruel.
31	"Lightning"	TBA
The fulmination that normally accompanies the Imp's cackling is missing.
32	"Eternal Flame"	TBA
Bob and Lumen show little respect for the Imp's conflagration of EVIL.
33	"Luxurious"	TBA
The Imp is convinced he has become wealthy.
34	"Brute Creation"	TBA
The Imp creates a monster, but Bob is less than impressed.
35	"Rock"	TBA
The Imp needs a hand in learning to master rock 'n' roll.
36	"Croquet"	2007
The Imp learns the malice of mallets.

== Awards ==
- MIPCOM JR Licensing Winner Challenge (Cannes, 2006)
- Best Short Film for Cars in Circle Talent Competition (UK, 2006)
- Pulcinella Awards Finalist - Cartoons on the Bay (Italy, 2006)
