= Ruby Barnhill =

British actress

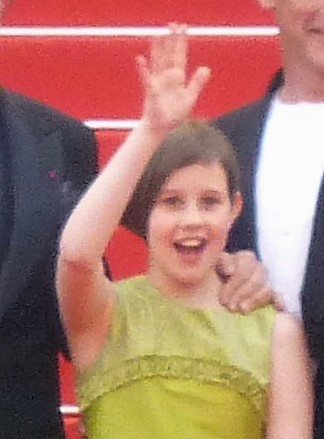
- Barnhill in 2016
- Born: 16 July 2004 (age 21); Knutsford, Cheshire, England
- Occupation: Actress
- Years active: 2015–2019, 2024–present

Ruby Barnhill (born 16 July 2004) is an English actress. She played the lead role of Sophie in Disney's live-action adaptation of The BFG, directed by Steven Spielberg, in 2016. She also subsequently provided the voice of Mary Smith in the English dub of 2017's Mary and the Witch's Flower, a film from Studio Ponoc directed by Hiromasa Yonebayashi.

== Early life and career ==
Barnhill was born on 16 July 2004 in Knutsford, Cheshire, England. She lives with her parents and younger sister in Cheshire, and she is a member of the local youth theatre.

In 2024, it was confirmed that Barnhill would voice Aurora in the English dub of Studio Ponoc's The Imaginary. Prior to this announcement, Barnhill's acting career seemed to be on hiatus as she had not been in anything since 2019's Princess Emmy, in which she voiced the title character. Back in 2016, Barnhill said in an interview that she was being careful not to let her instant fame go to her head. She admitted: "I'm not sure I want to do any more films. I like the idea of becoming a director – TV or maybe theatre – or a drama teacher."

== Filmography ==
=== Film ===
Year	Title	Role	Notes
2016	The BFG	Sophie	Nominated – London Film Critics Circle Award for Young British/Irish Performer of the Year; Nominated – Young Artist Award for Best Young Leading Actress; Nominated – Saturn Award for Best Performance by a Younger Actor
2018	Mary and the Witch's Flower	Mary Smith	Voice; English dub
2019	Princess Emmy	Princess Emmy	Voice
2024	The Imaginary	Aurora	Voice; English dub

=== Television ===
Year	Title	Role	Notes
2015–2017	4 O'Clock Club	Isobel	14 episodes
