= The BFG (2016 film) =

2016 film by Steven Spielberg

- Theatrical release poster
- Directed by: Steven Spielberg
- Screenplay by: Melissa Mathison
- Based on: The BFG by Roald Dahl
- Produced by: Steven Spielberg; Frank Marshall; Sam Mercer
- Starring: Mark Rylance; Ruby Barnhill; Penelope Wilton; Jemaine Clement; Rebecca Hall; Rafe Spall; Bill Hader
- Cinematography: Janusz Kamiński
- Edited by: Michael Kahn
- Music by: John Williams
- Production companies: Walt Disney Pictures; Amblin Entertainment; Reliance Entertainment; Walden Media; The Kennedy/Marshall Company; The Roald Dahl Story Company
- Distributed by: Walt Disney Studios Motion Pictures (Select territories); Entertainment One (United Kingdom); Reliance Entertainment (India)
- Release dates: May 14, 2016 (Cannes); July 1, 2016 (United States); July 22, 2016 (United Kingdom)
- Running time: 118 minutes
- Countries: United States; United Kingdom; India
- Language: English
- Budget: $140 million
- Box office: $199.6 million

The BFG (titled onscreen as Roald Dahl's The BFG) is a 2016 fantasy adventure film directed by Steven Spielberg, written by Melissa Mathison, and based on the 1982 novel. The film stars Mark Rylance, Ruby Barnhill, Penelope Wilton, Jemaine Clement, Rebecca Hall, Rafe Spall, and Bill Hader. In the film, a ten-year-old orphaned girl named Sophie befriends a benevolent giant and helps him to deal with some man-eating giants.

Kathleen Kennedy and Frank Marshall began development on a live-action adaptation of The BFG in the 1990s, and various screenwriters were hired to work on the screenplay in the subsequent years. DreamWorks acquired the screen rights to Dahl's book in September 2011, and Spielberg was announced as director in April 2014. Principal photography commenced in March 2015.

The BFG premiered at the Cannes Film Festival on May 14, 2016, and debuted in North America at the El Capitan Theatre on June 21, 2016. The film was released in the United States on July 1, 2016, the same year of Dahl's centennial. It received generally positive reviews from critics, but was a box office failure, grossing $199 million against its $140 million budget. It was the last film penned by Mathison before her death in 2015, and was dedicated to her.

== Plot ==
One night, Sophie, a smart and brave ten-year-old girl living in a London orphanage, catches sight of an elderly giant. The giant captures her and takes her to his residence in Giant Country. He tells Sophie that he took her so that she would never reveal the existence of giants to anyone. The giant creates a nightmare to prevent her from escaping, fearing she might be eaten by larger giants.

The next morning, Sophie is nearly discovered by Fleshlumpeater, the leader of the man-eating giants, but the elderly giant drives Fleshlumpeater away with a foul-tasting vegetable known as the snozzcumber. She persuades the elderly giant to take her to Dream Country.

Despite the elderly giant's careful moving around the sleeping giants, Bloodbottler wakes up and grabs BFG as the other giants wake up. After Bloodbottler suggests to Fleshlumpeater they should "frolic", they bully the friendly giant. A thunderstorm drives the Fleshlumpeater's group into their cave, but Fleshlumpeater finds Sophie's blanket.

In Dream Country, Sophie and the friendly giant catch good and bad dreams. The giant reveals that his only name – besides "Runt", the other giants' nickname for him – is "the Big Friendly Giant", which leads Sophie to call him "BFG". She accompanies him to London for his nightly work: using his dream trumpet to spread good dreams to sleeping children. They return to Giant Country just as the other giants have departed to go eat children worldwide. The BFG realizes that Sophie has lost her blanket, exposing her presence to the other giants, and leaves her outside her orphanage. Revealing that his last human companion liked to read, and even taught The BFG how to read, but sadly was discovered and eaten by the giants, he is unwilling to endanger Sophie and departs. Unafraid, Sophie jumps off her balcony hoping he will appear again to catch her, and he does.

They return to the BFG's workshop and the other giants barge in, hunting for Sophie. They destroy much of the BFG's work, but Sophie evades detection and the BFG drives them off with a hot iron. Sophie finds the home of the last human to live with the BFG, with a portrait of Queen Victoria among his belongings. This inspires her to devise a plan: to forge a nightmare for Elizabeth II, the Queen of the United Kingdom, about giants eating the children of England, the British Army fighting the giants, and Sophie appearing to her.

Sophie and the BFG go to Buckingham Palace and deliver the nightmare to the sleeping Queen. Upon waking, the Queen and her maid Mary and butler Mr Tibbs find Sophie on the windowsill. She introduces them to the BFG, explaining that the child-eating giants are real and must be stopped. At a large breakfast, the BFG shares his favourite drink, flatulence-inducing "frobscottle", and he and Sophie lead the Queen's soldiers to Giant Country.

The BFG plans to ambush the man-eating giants with a nightmare but has forgotten his dream trumpet. Sophie carries the nightmare herself into the midst of the giants and is confronted by Fleshlumpeater. She releases the nightmare, which consumes the giants with guilt, except the Fleshlumpeater (who intercepts and destroys his), and they are caught by military helicopters. Carried away to an isolated island, the giants are left with a large crate of snozzcumber seeds to plant.

Sophie gets adopted by Mary, comes to live in the Queen's palace, and awakens from a dream of the BFG, who returns to his life in Giant Country and writes the story of their adventure. She speaks to him whenever she feels lonely; at his home, the BFG hears her words and smiles.

== Cast ==
- Mark Rylance as the voice and motion-capture of Big Friendly Giant (BFG), an elderly, benevolent 24-foot giant. He is called "Runt" by the other giants.
- Ruby Barnhill as Sophie, an orphan who befriends The BFG. Dahl named her after his first grandchild, who was similarly caring and determined.
  - Lucia Ryan serves as Sophie's understudy in some scenes.
- Penelope Wilton as Queen Elizabeth II, the Queen of the United Kingdom.
- Jemaine Clement as the voice and motion-capture of Fleshlumpeater, a 54-foot giant who is the de facto leader of the man-eating giants who wears a cape and a skirt-like covering. He shows no regret for consuming children over the years.
- Rebecca Hall as Mary, Queen Elizabeth's maid and Sophie's adoptive mother.
- Rafe Spall as Mr. Tibbs, Queen Elizabeth's butler.
- Bill Hader as the voice and motion-capture of Bloodbottler, a disheveled 43-foot man-eating giant with cowlick hair and a skirt-like covering who is Fleshlumpeater's advisor and the most intelligent of the group.
- Michael Adamthwaite as:
  - The voice and motion-capture of Butcher Boy, a chubby, immature 40-foot man-eating giant who is the youngest of the group. He collects cars and wears clothes made of circus tents.
  - A Danish driver
- Daniel Bacon as:
  - The voice and motion-capture of Bonecruncher, a dark-skinned, bald-headed 40-foot man-eating giant wearing short pants-like clothing and a necklace of metal items. As the name suggests, he loves to crunch on the bones of his victims like candy. It's said he can be heard crunching bones for miles.
  - The second drunken lout that Sophie shouts at.
- Chris Gibbs as:
  - The voice and motion-capture of Gizzardgulper, a burly, bearded 39-foot man-eating giant who wears a helmet, a shoulder pad, and pants and is the shortest of the group.
  - A late night walker
- Adam Godley as:
  - The voice and motion-capture of Manhugger, a 60-foot slim man-eating giant who wears a vest and shorts. He seems to be the laziest of them all.
  - The first drunken lout that Sophie shouts at.
- Paul Moniz de Sa as:
  - The voice and motion-capture of Meatdripper, a well-groomed 40-foot man-eating giant with red Mohawk hair and red shorts. He also is the most serious about hunting in the group, clearly more determined than the rest to find Sophie.
  - The third drunken lout that Sophie shouts at.
- Jonathan Holmes as:
  - The voice and motion-capture of Childchewer, a balding 40-foot man-eating giant in a goatee and pontyail who is Meatdripper's best friend who wears a skirt-like covering. He obviously enjoys human child the most out of the giants.
  - A pub landlord
- Ólafur Darri Ólafsson as:
  - The voice and motion-capture of Maidmasher, a small-headed and fashionable 40-foot man-eating giant with short thinning hair, a vest, and high-rise pants.
  - Queen Elizabeth II's cook
- Marilyn Norry as Mrs. Clonkers, the head of the orphanage where Sophie was living.
- Callum Seagram Airlie as a Danish boy
- Haig Sutherland as the Danish Boy's father
- Shauna Hansen as the Danish Boy's mother
- Denise Jones as the wife of the Danish driver
- Anthony F. Ingram as a Buckingham Palace footman
- Gabrielle Rose as a female cook that works for Queen Elizabeth II
- Matt Frewer, Chris Shields, and Geoffrey Wade as The Queen's Generals.
- John Emmet Tracy, William Samples, Andy Thompson, and Ruby Barnhill's father Paul Barnhill as the assorted Buckingham Palace footmen
- Lucia Ryan as Orphan Girl #1
- Julia Torrance as Orphan Girl #2
- Cal Davis, Kyle Maloney, Michael Mcleod, David Orr, Zachary Read, David Glover, and Joshua Callagan as the pipers
- Todd Biffard as the piper drummer
- Randy Rafuse as a helicopter pilot

== Production ==
=== Development ===
Producers Frank Marshall and Kathleen Kennedy began development on a live-action adaptation of The BFG in 1991, and set the project up at Paramount Pictures. Husband and wife screenwriters Robin Swicord and Nicholas Kazan wrote a screenplay adaptation in 1998, with Robin Williams in negotiations for the title role. Williams attended a read-through, which according to Michael Siegel was "surprisingly disappointing". Williams' trademark improvisational style clashed with the BFG's unique language. Siegel elaborates, "He was sort of improvising on the jumbled language. And it was clunky. It was strangely not working. It was harder than it looks even for Robin. It didn't quite deliver." By 2001, the script had been rewritten by Gwyn Lurie, and was greeted with positive feedback from the Dahl estate. Terry Jones and Ed Solomon also attempted screenplay drafts. While the screenplay lingered in development hell, Paramount subsequently lost the film rights and they reverted to the Dahl estate.

In September 2011, DreamWorks acquired the film rights to the book; Kennedy and Marshall were announced to produce, with screenwriter Melissa Mathison adapting the story. Initially, John Madden was hired to direct; however, in April 2014, Steven Spielberg was announced as the director, with Madden now listed as executive producer with producer Michael Siegel. Kennedy had initially thought of Spielberg as director, but hesitated asking him until a more concrete screenplay was presentable. Spielberg stated, "The BFG has enchanted families and their children for more than three decades. We are honoured that the Roald Dahl estate has entrusted us with this classic story." Walden Media agreed to co-produce and co-finance the film with DreamWorks and Amblin Entertainment in March 2015. A month later, Walt Disney Studios—which was under prior agreement to distribute the film through its Touchstone Pictures banner—also joined the production as a co-producer and co-financier, and shifted the film from a Touchstone release to a Walt Disney Pictures production instead. Consequently, The BFG is the first Disney-branded film directed by Spielberg, though he has previously produced several films for the studio. Similarly, as a result of the restructuring of Amblin Partners, DreamWorks did not receive a marquee credit—placement of the studio's production logo on marketing materials and opening titles—and instead, DreamWorks' marquee credit shifted to Amblin. The film is the second adaptation of the novel following the 1989 direct-to-television animated film. It is also Disney's first feature-length adaptation of a Roald Dahl work since Henry Selick's James and the Giant Peach (1996).

=== Casting ===
Mark Rylance was cast as the BFG in October 2014. Spielberg had approached Rylance with the role during the filming of Bridge of Spies. Spielberg was quoted as saying that "Mark Rylance is a transformational actor. I am excited and thrilled that Mark will be making this journey with us to Giant Country. Everything about his career so far is about making the courageous choice and I'm honoured he has chosen The BFG as his next big screen performance." Rylance performed the character through motion capture, a process which he referred to as "liberating". In mid-November 2014, it was revealed that a ten-year-old student of Lower Peover School, Ruby Barnhill, had auditioned for the film. She had to learn six pages of dialogue in preparation for a possible role as the orphan Sophie. After a lengthy search, on December 16, Barnhill was cast in the role, about which she said, "I feel incredibly lucky and I'm so happy." Spielberg stated that they "have discovered a wonderful Sophie in Ruby Barnhill." Bill Hader was set to star in the film in an unspecified role on March 27, 2015. On April 13, 2015, the rest of the cast was announced, which included Penelope Wilton, Rebecca Hall, Jemaine Clement, Michael David Adamthwaite, Daniel Bacon, Chris Gibbs, Adam Godley, Jonathan Holmes, Paul Moniz de Sa, and Ólafur Ólafsson.

=== Filming ===
Principal photography on the film began on March 23, 2015, in Vancouver and concluded on June 12, 2015. Weta Digital worked on the film's visual effects. It was Mathison's last and sole posthumous film following her death on November 4, 2015.

== Music ==
John Williams composed and conducted the film's musical score, marking the twenty-seventh collaboration between Spielberg and Williams. Williams was announced as the film's composer in March 2015. During the process of writing the score, Williams compared the film to "a child's ballet where there are dances involved," elaborating, "The BFG tries to capture dreams with his net and does something that almost looks like a Ray Bolger or Fred Astaire dance; it is an amazingly musical and choreographic sequence which required the orchestra to do things that are more associated with musical films." Williams found similarities with the scoring of Home Alone, admitting that writing music for The BFG "was really an opportunity to compose and orchestrate a little children's fantasy for orchestra." The soundtrack was released by Walt Disney Records on July 1, 2016.

== Release ==
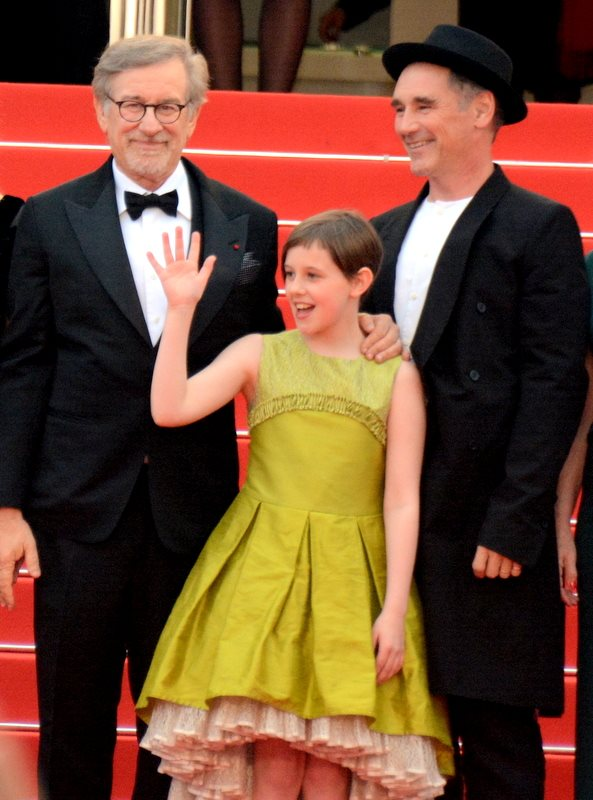
Spielberg, Barnhill and Rylance promoting the film at the 2016 Cannes Film Festival.

The BFG premiered on May 14, 2016, at the 2016 Cannes Film Festival, in an out of competition screening. Walt Disney Studios Motion Pictures distributed the film worldwide, except for territories in Europe, Africa and the Middle East, where the film's distribution rights were sold by Amblin's international partner, Mister Smith Entertainment, to independent distributors. Amblin Partners' financial partner, Reliance Entertainment, released the film in India on July 29, 2016. Huaxia Film Distribution released the film in China.

Disney released a teaser trailer on December 9, 2015. A second trailer was released on April 5, 2016. A third trailer was released on May 16, 2016. The film held its North American premiere at the El Capitan Theatre in Hollywood, California on June 21, 2016. It was released in the United States on July 1, 2016. Entertainment One distributed the film in the United Kingdom on July 22, 2016.

Walt Disney Studios Home Entertainment released The BFG on Blu-ray, DVD, and digital download on November 29, 2016. The film debuted in third of the home media sales chart for the week ending on December 2, 2016. Entertainment One and 20th Century Fox Home Entertainment released the UK edition on DVD in 2016.

== Reception ==
=== Box office ===
The BFG grossed $55.5 million in North America and $144.2 million in other territories for a worldwide total of $199.6 million, against a production budget of $140 million.

In the United States and Canada, The BFG opened alongside The Legend of Tarzan and The Purge: Election Year at 3,357 theaters, and was projected to gross $22–32 million in its opening weekend. The film was notably vying for drawing family audiences with the studio's own Finding Dory. It made $775,000 from its Thursday previews; however, the low figure was not surprising, given how family films tend to attract fewer audiences during late-night showings. This was followed by a $7 million opening day (including previews) and a disappointing $18.6 million opening weekend, which Deadline Hollywood called "an awful start for this film which is estimated to cost $140 million". Forbes noted that Steven Spielberg's films tend to have long runs, irrespective of their opening numbers. However, it also pointed out that the July 4th weekend proves to be a non-leggy release schedule and most films released during this time end up making only twice their holiday total over the course of their domestic theatrical run. The New York Times called the opening figures "a colossal misfire".

Due to the film's poor performance in North America, the film was considered a box office bomb. As a result of its low opening numbers in North America, the film needed greater financial success in its international markets, as pointed out by David Hollis, Disney's distribution chief, saying, "we're going to be reliant in a lot of ways on international [audiences]". Internationally—during its opening weekend—where the 4th of July weekend is not a holiday, the film opened to $3.9 million in its opening weekend from two markets, Australia and Russia. In Australia, it opened to $2 million placing third while in Russia it debuted second with $1.9 million, which tops the entire runs of Charlie and the Chocolate Factory and War Horse. In the United Kingdom, where the book is more well known, it opened to $6.9 million.

In China, the release was handled by Huaxia Film Distribution. While it benefitted from a robust marketing effort including Spielberg's presence in the country itself, it suffered from a three month long delay after its North American release. It had an estimated $13.8 million opening, debuting at second place behind Operation Mekong. Many Chinese online reviews criticized Spielberg for making the film "too juvenile" for adults.

The BFG is one of the lowest-grossing films of Spielberg's career, specifically in North America and, when accounting for inflation, one of the year's biggest flops, but The Hollywood Reporter noted that Disney would be able to withstand the losses due to the success of Captain America: Civil War and Finding Dory. The site also highlighted that the financial losses for Disney could be $90–100 million based on theatrical returns alone.

=== Critical response ===
On the review aggregator Rotten Tomatoes, the film has an approval rating of 74% based on 308 reviews and an average rating of 6.70/10. The site's critical consensus reads, "The BFG minimizes the darker elements of Roald Dahl's classic in favor of a resolutely good-natured, visually stunning, and largely successful family-friendly adventure." On another aggregator, Metacritic, the film has a score of 66 out of 100 based on 47 critics, indicating "generally favorable reviews". Audiences polled by CinemaScore gave the film an average grade of "A−" on an A+ to F scale.

Justin Chang of Los Angeles Times called Rylance's performance a "brilliant amalgam of performance-capture technology and peerless screen presence." Scott Mendelson of Forbes described the film as "a charming, intelligent, and witty little adventure movie with strong special effects work in the service of a most unassuming story." Mendelson also commended the film's smaller scope in story, as well as Rylance and Barnhill's interaction. Robbie Collin of The Daily Telegraph called the film "a significant technical accomplishment", adding that "the infinitesimally detailed motion-capture technology alone, which stretches Rylance’s human performance to gargantuan proportions, is river-straddling bounds beyond anything that’s come before it." Critic Matt Zoller Seitz highly appreciated Spielberg's direction of the film, giving the film three and a half out of four stars. Seitz remarks, "I can imagine some adults finding the movie dull; 'Nothing happens', they'll say. 'And it's too nice.' But I can imagine other adults loving the film for helping them remember what it's like to be young enough to hide from a movie monster because he's big and weird-looking and then laugh because he's kind of silly..."

Todd McCarthy of The Hollywood Reporter compared the film negatively to Spielberg's E.T. the Extra-Terrestrial, as a "conspicuously less captivating, magical and transporting experience than its classic forebear." Peter Debruge of Variety, however, compared the film favorably to E.T., writing, "this splendid Steven Spielberg-directed adaptation makes it possible for audiences of all ages to wrap their heads around one of the unlikeliest friendships in cinema history, resulting in the sort of instant family classic “human beans” once relied upon Disney to deliver." A. O. Scott of The New York Times praised the film's digital effects and visual style as "exquisite", though he felt that the film lacked the excitement found in Spielberg's previous fantasy films.

Richard Brody of The New Yorker stating that it "plays like a forced march of fun, a mandatory strain of magic and a prescribed dose of poetry, like a movie ready-made for screening in classrooms when a teacher is absent." Brody, however, observes that "Spielberg is the BFG who's menaced by bigger and more monstrous giants who aren't interested in edifying their audiences but merely in consuming them—consuming the consumer, so to speak." Richard Roeper of the Chicago Sun-Times called the film "technically impressive but listless and tedious... painfully cutesy, silly and gross rather than whimsical and funny." He thought that the film moved far too slowly and was missing a "sense of wonder and adventure", saying that he'd "rather see every one of Spielberg's previous films before having to sit through The BFG again".

=== Accolades ===
List of awards and nominations
Award	Date of ceremony	Category	Recipient(s)	Result	Ref(s)
Annie Awards	February 4, 2017	Outstanding Achievement, Animated Effects in a Live Action Production	Claude Schitter, Benjaman Folkman, Gary Boyle, David Caeiro and Luke Millar	Nominated	
British Academy Children's Awards	November 20, 2016	BAFTA Kids' Vote	The BFG	Nominated	
Evening Standard British Film Awards	December 8, 2016	Best Actor	Mark Rylance	Nominated	
Golden Tomato Awards	January 12, 2017	Best Kids/Family Movie 2016	The BFG	5th Place	
London Film Critics' Circle	January 22, 2017	Young British/Irish Performer of the Year	Ruby Barnhill	Nominated	
Satellite Awards	February 19, 2017	Best Original Score	John Williams	Nominated	
Satellite Awards	February 19, 2017	Best Visual Effects	The BFG	Nominated	
Saturn Awards	June 28, 2017	Best Fantasy Film	The BFG	Nominated	
Saturn Awards	June 28, 2017	Best Director	Steven Spielberg	Nominated	
Saturn Awards	June 28, 2017	Best Writing	Melissa Mathison	Nominated	
Saturn Awards	June 28, 2017	Best Actor	Mark Rylance	Nominated	
Saturn Awards	June 28, 2017	Best Performance by a Younger Actor	Ruby Barnhill	Nominated	
Saturn Awards	June 28, 2017	Best Music	John Williams	Nominated	
Saturn Awards	June 28, 2017	Best Editing	Michael Kahn	Won	
Saturn Awards	June 28, 2017	Best Production Design	Rick Carter and Robert Stromberg	Won	
Saturn Awards	June 28, 2017	Best Costume Design	Joanna Johnston	Nominated	
Saturn Awards	June 28, 2017	Best Special Effects	Joe Letteri and Joel Whist	Nominated	
Washington D.C. Area Film Critics Association	December 5, 2016	Best Motion Capture Performance	Mark Rylance	Won	
Women Film Critics Circle	December 19, 2016	Best Animated Female	The BFG	Nominated	
World Soundtrack Awards	October 20, 2016	Film Composer of the Year	John Williams (also for Star Wars: The Force Awakens)	Nominated	

== See also ==
- The BFG, the 1989 British animated feature
