= Shaun Lawton =

British actor

Sydney Shaun Lawton (1941 – 31 August 2025) in New Marske, North Riding of Yorkshire) was an English playwright, poet, actor and singer/songwriter. Lawton is probably best known for his Desperado Corner, which has been described as a "sprawling, four-act, mad, wonderful play... about working class boys from Redcar standing in pools of piss swearing". Lawton showed the play to Di Trevis, who directed its premier in the Glasgow Citizens Theatre in 1981.

Lawton later played film roles in Possession (1981), John Rabe (2009), and Anonymous (2011).
