= Jerusalem (play) =

Play by Jez Butterworth

- Cover art from the 2009 Royal Court Theatre book
- Original language: English
- Written by: Jez Butterworth

Premiere
- Date: 15 July 2009
- Place: Royal Court Theatre, London

Jerusalem (2009) is a play by Jez Butterworth; it opened in the Jerwood Theatre of the Royal Court Theatre in London. The production starred Mark Rylance as Johnny "Rooster" Byron and Mackenzie Crook as Ginger. After receiving rave reviews, its run was extended. In January 2010 it was transferred to the Apollo Theatre; it played on Broadway in the summer of 2011.

The play has achieved wide acclaim: it has been described as "the greatest British play of the [21st] century" and one of the "best plays of all time".

== Synopsis ==
On St George's Day, morning of the local county fair in Wiltshire, Johnny "Rooster" Byron, local 'waster' and modern-day Pied Piper, is a wanted man. The council officials want to serve him an eviction notice, his young son wants him to take him to the fair, Troy Whitworth wants to give him a serious kicking, and a motley crew of mates want his ample supply of drugs and alcohol.

== Characters ==
Jerusalem has a cast of around 14:

- Johnny "Rooster" Byron – an opinionated, eccentric, ex-daredevil and teller of fantastically improbable stories, he has a young son whom he rarely sees. He lives in a caravan in the local woods. He holds parties where he gets drunk and supplies drugs, some of them to under-age kids. He has a rare type of blood, and he makes money by selling his blood for transfusion.
- Ginger – underdog of the group, older than the others who hang around with Johnny, never having grown out of the lifestyle. He aspires to be a DJ, but is an unemployed plasterer.
- The Professor – vague and whimsical yet kind, the elderly professor spouts philosophical nothings and unwittingly takes LSD. He has a good relationship with Johnny.
- Davey – young teenage abattoir worker who is best friends with Lee, and visits Rooster regularly for free drugs and alcohol. He can't stand the idea of leaving Wiltshire.
- Troy Whitworth – local thug, the same age as Ginger. Troy's stepdaughter goes missing (after it is strongly implied he abuses her); he badly beats Johnny at the end of the play.
- Lee – young teenager, enters the play after having been hidden on the sofa asleep. He plans to emigrate to Australia the next day, despite having little money to take with him.
- Phaedra – Troy's stepdaughter is seen at the beginning of both Acts One and Two singing the hymn "Jerusalem" and dressed in fairy wings. She is said to have disappeared; at the end of Act Two it is revealed that she is hiding in Johnny's caravan.
- Pea and Tanya – two local girls who emerge from underneath Johnny's caravan, having fallen asleep drunk.
- Dawn – Johnny's ex-girlfriend and mother to son Marky. Although she disapproves of his life, she kisses him again but there is no reconciliation.
- Marky – Johnny's six-year-old son.
- Wesley – the local pub landlord, he is involved in the festivities for St George's Day and has been roped into doing Morris Dancing.
- Linda Fawcett and Luke Parsons – council officials
- Frank Whitworth – Brother of Troy Whitworth
- Danny Whitworth – Younger brother of Troy and Frank Whitworth

== Inspiration for the play ==
The BBC reported that the character of Johnny "Rooster" Byron was based on retired builder Micky Lay, who lived in a caravan in Pewsey, Wiltshire. Actor Mark Rylance met Lay and modelled his performance on Lay's mannerisms. He later gave Lay the Tony award he had received for his performance. Lay died of a heart attack in December 2013, while waiting for his local pub to open. Though the play does not specify a location of events, the community depicted is reportedly based on Pewsey, and the local festival is modelled on Pewsey's annual carnival fortnight.

The play makes frequent allusions to William Blake's lyrics to the song "Jerusalem", from which its title is derived.

== Productions ==
=== 2009 Royal Court ===
The premiere of the play was at the Royal Court Theatre in London in the downstairs Jerwood Theatre. The staging involved live chickens, a live tortoise and goldfish, and several real trees surrounding an onstage caravan.

It was directed by Ian Rickson and starred Mark Rylance as Johnny, Mackenzie Crook as Ginger, Alan David as the Professor, Tom Brooke as Lee, Danny Kirrane as Davey, Gerard Horan as Wesley and Barry Sloane as Troy Whitworth, Aimee-Ffion Edwards as Phaedra, Lucy Montgomery as Dawn, Dan Poole as Danny and Lennie Harvey as Marky.

It received very positive reviews all round:

There are several of the Royal Court's trademark "in your face" shock tactics and an exceptionally high swear word count even by the exacting standards of the address, this rich three-hour play is also tender, touching, and blessed with both a ribald humour and a haunting sense of the mystery of things. — The Daily Telegraph

Jerusalem is a bold, ebullient and often hilarious State-of-England or (almost) State-of-Olde-England play... [Johnny] is a shrewd, bold, defiant, charismatic, even mesmeric man born out of his time. Imagine King Arthur reincarnated as a troll and you have something of the quality he brings to the debased pastoral he grittily, comically and finally mournfully inhabits. — The Times

Rylance is magnificent in a hugely demanding role, and restores one's faith in the power of theatre to make a really beautiful noise and on a scale that is both epic and potentially popular. — The Independent

=== 2010 West End ===
Following a successful run at London's 380-seat Royal Court theatre, Jerusalem transferred to London's West End at the 796-seat Apollo Theatre for a limited 12-week season from 28 January 2010, closing on 24 April 2010. There it received its first negative review. Tim Walker in the Sunday Telegraph wrote of the character of Rooster: "With his chest out and his head back, lined up in a vertical line with his bottom, the actor does indeed resemble a rooster. The problem with the term 'local personality,' however, is that it is all too often a polite euphemism for a crushing bore, and three hours in Rooster's company does prove to be something of an endurance test." Rylance won the Laurence Olivier Award for Best Actor for his performance.

=== 2011 Broadway ===
Jerusalem opened on Broadway on 21 April 2011 at the Music Box Theatre, following previews from 2 April 2011. It was scheduled to play a limited season until 24 July 2011, and then got a four-week extension (to 21 August). Mark Rylance reprises the role of Rooster, with Mackenzie Crook and most of the original Royal Court cast also transferring. The full cast for the production was announced on 17 February 2011, with John Gallagher, Jr., Max Baker, Geraldine Hughes, Richard Short, Molly Ranson, and James Riordan joining the show. The play received a Tony Award nomination for Best Play, but lost to War Horse. Rylance won the Best Actor in a Play award for his performance.

=== 2011 return to West End ===
After its Broadway engagement, Jerusalem returned to the West End in London, playing at the Apollo from 8 October 2011 until 14 January 2012. Again, reviews were very positive, with The Daily Telegraph critic Charles Spencer giving it five stars (out of five), describing Mark Rylance as "an actor of indisputable greatness, giving the most thrilling performance it has ever been my privilege to witness."

=== 2014 San Francisco ===
In January 2014, Jerusalem had its west coast premiere at the San Francisco Playhouse in San Francisco, California. The first professional production of the play without the involvement of playwright Jez Butterworth, the play garnered positive reviews, with San Francisco Examiner critic Jean Schiffman lauding Brian Dykstra's "enthralling, complex portrayal" of Johnny "Rooster" Byron.

=== 2018 Toronto ===
In February 2018, Toronto's The Company Theatre (TCT) and Outside the March co-produced the Canadian premiere of Jerusalem at Crow's Theatre's Streetcar Crowsnest in association with Starvox Entertainment. The production starred Canadian actor Kim Coates, marking his return to the stage after almost 30 years. The production featured TCT's largest ensemble cast since their production of Festen (2008), which boasted a cast of 14:

- Kim Coates as Johnny "Rooster" Byron
- Philip Riccio as Ginger
- Nicholas Campbell as Professor
- Shakura Dickson as Phaedra
- Kieran Sequoia as Ms. Fawcett
- Michael Spencer-Davis as Mr. Parsons
- Christo Graham as Lee
- Peter Fernandes as Davey
- Brenna Coates as Tanya
- Daniel Kash as Wesley
- Diana Donnelly as Dawn
- Katelyn McCulloch as Pea
- Evan Kearns/Daniel Kohlsmith as Marky
- Jason Cadieux as Troy Whitworth

Jerusalem was nominated for six awards in the 2018 Dora Mavor Moore Award, and won in every category: Outstanding Production of a Play, Outstanding Performance by Male in a Principal Role - Play (Coates), Outstanding Performance by an Ensemble, Outstanding Direction (Cushman), Outstanding Scenic Design (Blais), and Outstanding Lighting Design (du Toit). The play was also awarded the John Caplan Audience Choice Award.

=== 2022 return to West End ===
Jerusalem returned to the Apollo in the West End in London, in a run from 16 April 2022 until 6 August 2022, with Mark Rylance, Mackenzie Crook, Gerard Horan, Barry Sloane and Alan David reprising their roles as Johnny "Rooster" Byron, Ginger, Wesley, Troy Whitworth and The Professor respectively.

=== Other productions ===
In 2014 an outdoor production created by Common Players with Northcott Theatre, reimagined as "New Jerusalem", toured around Devon and Somerset.

May 2017 at Hampton Hill Theatre, Hampton, United Kingdom. Steve Webb played Rooster. Directed by John Buckingham. Jez Butterworth sent a brief filmed message of support to the cast

In Summer 2018 a production of Jerusalem was staged at The Watermill Theatre, near Newbury, with Jasper Britton as Rooster.

In June 2019, United Players in Vancouver, Canada, mounted a production at the Jericho Arts Centre. Directed by Kathleen Duborg, with Adam Henderson as Rooster, the production received a very positive reception during its run.

In July 2019, Grec Festival 2019 in Barcelona, Spain, mounted production at the Teatre Grec. Directed by Julio Manrique and translation into Catalan by Cristina Genebat.

In February 2024, the Helsinki City Theatre, Helsinki, Finland, dramatized the play in Finnish, with Santeri Kinnunen playing Rooster.

In September 2025, the Wild Will Theatre Company staged an outdoor, immersive production of Jerusalem as part of its seasonal programme, performing the play in a woodland setting that echoed its rural themes. The company mounted another outdoor production of Jerusalem in 2026.

== Legacy ==
The play was listed in the book and iPad app Played in Britain: Modern Theatre in 100 Plays, where it was selected as being among one hundred of the "best and most influential plays" performed in Britain from 1945 - 2010.

In 2013, the play was voted 6th in English Touring Theatre's public poll to determine the "nation's favourite play", and was one of the most popular plays with voters in London and the South East England.

In 2014, the play was voted 9th in WhatsOnStage.com's public poll to determine "The top 100 plays of all time!"

In 2015, the play was included in Michael Billington's list of the "101 greatest plays" ever written in any western language. Billington later made a list for The Guardian of "the 25 best British plays since Jerusalem" (to celebrate the play being revived at the Watermill Theatre 2018) where he described Butterworth's play as "the hit that transformed British theatre."

In 2019, Dominic Cavendish wrote an article for The Telegraph titled "The greatest British play of the century: why Jez Butterworth's Jerusalem is a masterpiece".

In 2019, the play was named as one of "The 40 best plays of all time" by The Independent.

In 2019, writers for The Guardian ranked Jerusalem as the greatest theatrical work since 2000.

== Awards and nominations ==
=== Original Broadway production ===
Year	Award	Category	Nominee	Result	Ref
2011	Tony Awards	Best Play	Jez Butterworth	Nominated	
2011	Tony Awards	Best Actor in a Play	Mark Rylance	Won	
2011	Tony Awards	Best Featured Actor in a Play	Mackenzie Crook	Nominated	
2011	Tony Awards	Best Sound Design in a Play	Ian Dickinson	Nominated	
2011	Tony Awards	Best Lighting Design in a Play	Mimi Jordan Sherin	Nominated	
2011	Tony Awards	Best Scenic Design in a Play	Ultz	Nominated	
2011	Drama Desk Award	Outstanding Actor in a Play	Mark Rylance	Nominated	
2011	Drama League Award	Distinguished Production of a Play		Nominated	
2011	Outer Critics Circle Awards	Outstanding Actor in a Play	Mark Rylance	Nominated	
2011	New York Drama Critics' Circle Award	Best Foreign Play	Jez Butterworth	Won	

== See also ==
- The Ferryman (play)
