= Farinelli and the King =

2015 play by Claire van Kempen

- Written by: Claire van Kampen
- Original language: English
- Genre: Drama

Premiere
- Date premiered: 11 February 2015
- Place premiered: Sam Wanamaker Playhouse

Farinelli and the King is a 2015 play with music, written by Claire van Kampen. The play involves King Philip V of Spain, who is troubled with insomnia, and the castrato Farinelli who is played by two persons, an actor and a singer. It premiered in London in 2015.

== Productions ==
The play made its world premiere at the Sam Wanamaker Playhouse, London, on 11 February 2015, running until 7 March. The production transferred to the Duke of York's Theatre where it was co-produced by Sonia Friedman, again starring Mark Rylance. It played a limited run from 14 September 2015 until 5 December.

The play had its Broadway premiere, again starring Mark Rylance and directed by John Dove, at the Belasco Theatre. Previews started 5 December 2017 with an official opening on 17 December 2017. The limited run concluded on 25 March 2018. The play recouped its Broadway capitalization.

== Synopsis ==
King Philip V of Spain suffers from mental troubles which have made his counsellors deem him unfit to rule. As the play opens, he is seen fishing for his pet goldfish in a large brandy glass, then panicking when his Queen and second wife, the Italian Isabella Farnese, lights some candles, and extinguishing them with the water from the goldfish glass. Isabella travels to London, where she hears the famous castrato Farinelli sing and gets the idea that the inspiring and soothing power of his music could help her husband emerge from depression. She asks the impresario Rich, producer of The Beggar's Opera, to present this proposal to Farinelli; he treats her contemptuously as just another crazed fan of Farinelli until she leaves and he reads her note and realizes to his horror that she really is the Queen of Spain.

Farinelli comes to Spain and to the court, and King Philip makes him prove who he is by asking him harsh questions. Farinelli reveals that it was his brother Riccardo who castrated him when he was ten to preserve his wonderful soprano voice, and answers yes to Philip's blunt query as to whether he can have sex with a woman. (Men castrated solely for purposes of singing lost only their testicles, so this is true.) He then sings for Philip.

(The Singer, billed as such, is a countertenor dressed in a costume identical to the one the actor playing Farinelli wears, and who sings Farinelli's musical role. There are two reasons for this. One is casting: a good actor and a wonderful countertenor singer are rarely found in the same body. The second is dramatic: Farinelli-the-man looks at the super-celebrity Farinelli-the-singer as a distinct 'other' self.)

When Farinelli/The Singer has sung beautifully for the King, Philip's chief counsellor and his doctor come in with a complex budget report and a document of abdication; if Philip cannot understand the budget report, they will get him to abdicate. Philip pages hastily through the budget report and suddenly makes incisive and brilliant comments on its omissions and mistakes. The music therapy has worked, and the abdication is shelved.

Farinelli continues to sing for Philip and Isabella, and the King continues to rule viably, but is still whimsical. He decides to go and live in the middle of the forest so that he can hear the stars singing. Farinelli and Isabella go with him, and Farinelli gives a concert in the woods, to which all the local villagers and forest-dwelling commoners come uninvited. The theater audience stands in for these spectators, Philip addressing some audience members as specific local characters, and Farinelli sings for all.

Farinelli and Queen Isabella develop feelings for each other, and Farinelli/The Singer sings her a love aria which is heartfelt and emotional rather than just brilliant and impressive like his earlier arias. They realize that they must get Philip to leave the forest. He does, lamenting that he had almost got to be able to hear the singing of the stars. He continues to be able to rule, and is last seen dressing in ceremonial armour and mounting an effigy of a horse to pose for an official portrait. Meanwhile, Isabella gets an opera house built in Madrid despite courtiers’ comments that opera will never succeed in Spain.

Rich, who has appeared from time to time commenting on developments in the theatrical and political world, meets Isabella again, no longer at court because Philip is dead and her hostile stepson is King. Farinelli is then seen in retirement in Bologna. His friend and tailor begs him to sing his greatest aria, Handel's "Lascia ch'io pianga" (“Let me weep”), which is even more sincerely emotional than his outpouring to Isabella. As The Singer fills the theater with the beautiful sadness of the aria, Farinelli's friend quietly leaves him alone. At the end, The Singer touches Farinelli affectionately and withdraws.

== Cast ==
Note: All cast members reprised their roles for each production

- Mark Rylance as Philip V of Spain
- Sam Crane as Farinelli
  - Iestyn Davies as Farinelli's singing voice
- Melody Grove as Isabella Farnese
- Colin Hurley as Metastasio
- Simon Jones as John Rich
- Huss Garbiya as Doctor Jose Cervi
- Edward Peel as De la Cuadra
- Matthew Darcy as Jethro

== Awards and nominations ==
=== Original West End production ===
Year	Award Ceremony	Category	Nominee	Result
2016	Laurence Olivier Awards	Best New Play		Nominated
2016	Laurence Olivier Awards	Best Actor	Mark Rylance	Nominated
2016	Laurence Olivier Awards	Best Actress in a Supporting Role	Melody Grove	Nominated
2016	Laurence Olivier Awards	Best Set Design	Jonathan Fensom	Nominated
2016	Laurence Olivier Awards	Best Costume Design	Jonathan Fensom	Nominated
2016	Laurence Olivier Awards	Outstanding Achievement in Music	Iestyn Davies, the Musicians and the Singers for performing and Claire van Kampen for arranging	Nominated
2016	WhatsOnStage Awards	Best New Play		Nominated
2016	WhatsOnStage Awards	Best Actor in a Play	Mark Rylance	Nominated

=== Original Broadway production ===
Year	Award Ceremony	Category	Nominee	Result
2018	Outer Critics Circle Award	Outstanding New Broadway Play		Nominated
2018	Outer Critics Circle Award	Outstanding Lighting Design	Paul Russell	Nominated
2018	Outer Critics Circle Award	Outstanding Orchestrations	Claire van Kampen	Nominated
2018	Drama Desk Award	Costume Design for a Play	Jonathan Fensom	Won
2018	Drama Desk Award	Outstanding Lighting Design for a Play	Paul Russell	Nominated
2018	Drama Desk Award	Outstanding Wig and Hair Design	Campbell Young Associates	Nominated
2018	Tony Award	Best Play		Nominated
2018	Tony Award	Best Performance by an Actor in a Leading Role in a Play	Mark Rylance	Nominated
2018	Tony Award	Best Scenic Design in a Play	Jonathan Fensom	Nominated
2018	Tony Award	Best Costume Design in a Play	Jonathan Fensom	Nominated
2018	Tony Award	Best Lighting Design in a Play	Paul Russell	Nominated
