= The Outfit (2022 film) =

Film by Graham Moore

- Theatrical release poster
- Directed by: Graham Moore
- Written by: Graham Moore; Johnathan McClain
- Produced by: Scoop Wasserstein; Amy Jackson; Ben Browning
- Starring: Mark Rylance; Zoey Deutch; Johnny Flynn; Dylan O'Brien; Nikki Amuka-Bird; Simon Russell Beale; Alan Mehdizadeh
- Cinematography: Dick Pope
- Edited by: William Goldenberg
- Music by: Alexandre Desplat
- Production company: FilmNation Entertainment
- Distributed by: Focus Features (United States); Universal Pictures (International)
- Release dates: February 14, 2022 (Berlinale); March 18, 2022 (United States)
- Running time: 106 minutes
- Country: United States
- Language: English
- Budget: $5 million
- Box office: $4 million

The Outfit is a 2022 American psychological thriller crime drama film directed by Graham Moore in his directorial debut from a screenplay by Moore and Johnathan McClain. The film stars Mark Rylance, who leads an ensemble cast including Zoey Deutch, Johnny Flynn, Dylan O'Brien, Nikki Amuka-Bird, and Simon Russell Beale. Rylance plays an English cutter who runs a tailor shop in Chicago, whose customers include a group of vicious gangsters.

The film premiered at the 72nd Berlin International Film Festival on February 14, 2022, and was released in the United States on March 18, 2022, by Focus Features, to positive reviews from critics.

== Plot ==
In 1956 Chicago, Leonard Burling is an English bespoke "cutter", with a shop in a neighborhood controlled by Irish Mob boss Roy Boyle. Roy's son and second-in-command, Richie, and his chief enforcer, Francis, use Leonard's shop as a stash house for dirty money and messages; Leonard tolerates this arrangement as the Boyles and their men are his best customers. Leonard also shares a complicated relationship with shop receptionist Mable, who is also Richie's girlfriend.

One night, Francis shows up at the shop with Richie, who's been shot in the abdomen after a confrontation with the rival LaFontaine family. Leonard is forced at gunpoint to treat Richie's wounds and hide a briefcase containing a copy of an FBI recording with detailed information on the crew's operations, which was provided by "The Outfit", a nationwide syndicate founded by Al Capone. Francis gets in touch with Roy and departs, leaving Leonard and Richie alone. Richie believes that there is a rat in their organization, as the LaFontaines seem to know their every move, and believes that the recording will reveal the rat's identity. Leonard suggests to Richie that Francis is the rat.

When Francis returns, Leonard intercepts him, claiming that Richie is light-headed and delusional from blood loss. Richie threatens Francis, who kills him. He and Leonard hide Richie's body just as Roy arrives with his bodyguard Monk. The two men lie and tell Roy that Richie left the store on his own; Francis volunteers to go find him. Roy notices Richie's coat in the store's backroom and threatens Leonard. Francis then returns with Mable in tow, claiming that he found Richie's blood in her apartment and suggesting that she is the rat. When Roy orders his men to torture her for information, Leonard distracts him by revealing the reason why he came to Chicago: his wife and daughter were killed in a fire at his former shop and home on Savile Row.

Leonard's phone rings and he answers it; he lies that the caller was Richie, who is waiting for Roy. Roy and Monk depart, but Francis stays. Leonard convinces Francis to betray Roy by using Mable, who really is the rat and has been selling information to LaFontaine and the FBI; Roy's death at LaFontaine's hands will allow Francis to take over Roy's business. At Leonard's urging, Mable calls LaFontaine (in French) to give out Roy's location and offer to sell the recording. Francis hides at the back of the store when Lafontaine (who turns out to be a woman—Violet) arrives, intending to kill her, but Leonard silently warns Violet and her bodyguards shoot Francis twice instead, after Leonard distracts him. Violet pays Mable and leaves with the tape.

It is revealed that the night's events played out due to Leonard's manipulation. Leonard has been deceiving the Boyles by planting fake messages from The Outfit, knowing Mable had placed an FBI tape recorder in his store. The tape Violet took was a dummy; the real one is still in the store and has been recording the night's conversations, capturing enough information to convict any remaining Boyles as well as LaFontaine. Leonard gives Mable the real tape to send to the FBI and urges her to use LaFontaine's money to live her dreams.

Intending to start over again, Leonard douses the store with flammable liquid and lights it with a match, but is interrupted when Francis gets up and tries to kill him. Leonard tells Francis that he used to be a gang enforcer like him, but left when he was ordered to commit a heinous crime. Fleeing from his gang, he reinvented himself and started a family, until his old gang found them and burned down his shop, killing his wife and daughter. Leonard fatally stabs Francis in the neck with his prized fabric shears. Wearing a new suit that he has been assembling over the last two days, he quietly leaves the store as it burns.

== Cast ==
- Mark Rylance as Leonard Burling
- Johnny Flynn as Francis
- Zoey Deutch as Mable Shaun
- Dylan O'Brien as Richie Boyle
- Simon Russell Beale as Roy Boyle
- Nikki Amuka-Bird as Violet LaFontaine
- Alan Mehdizadeh as Monk

== Production ==
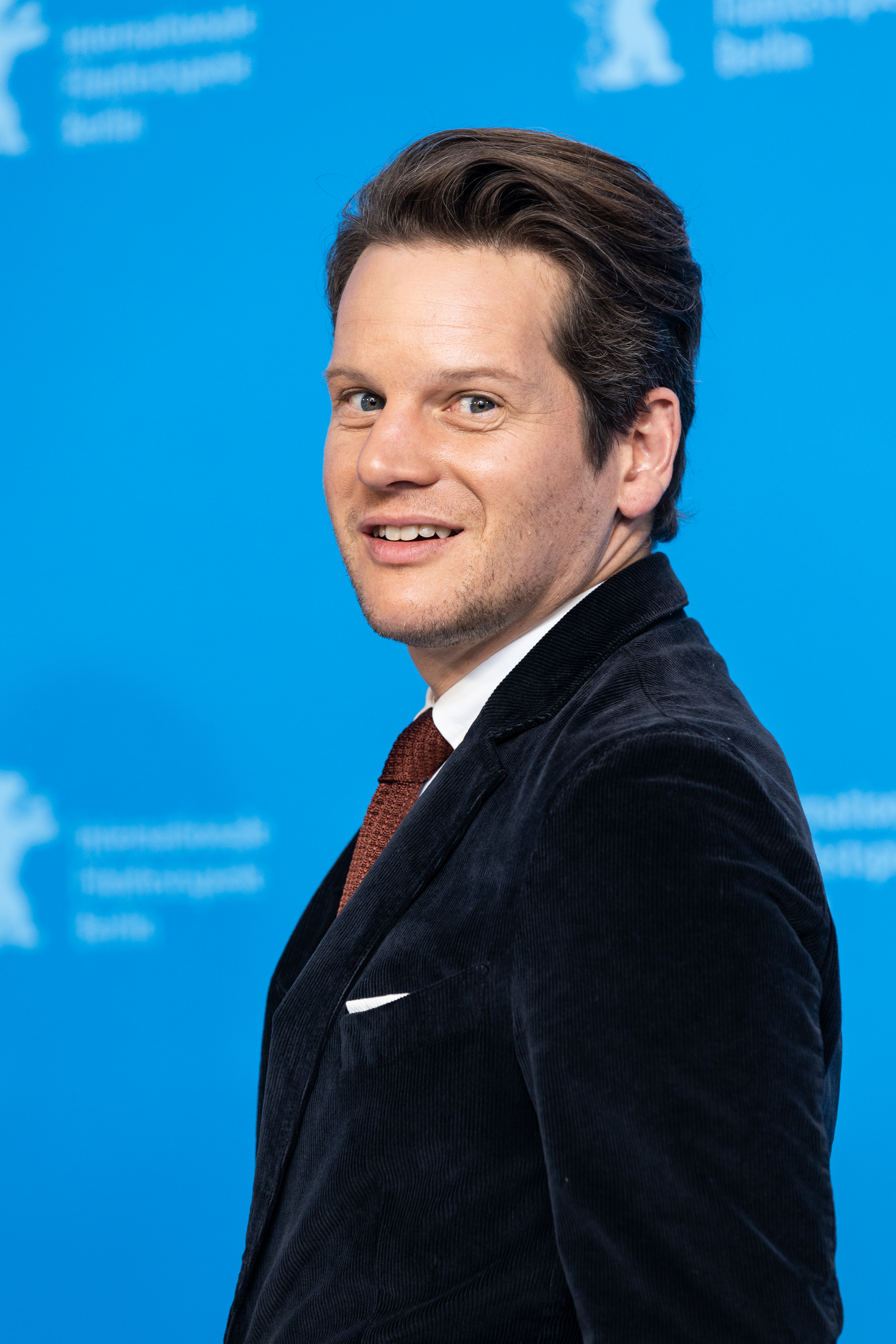
Director Graham Moore at the film's premiere in Berlin

The Outfit is the directorial debut of Graham Moore. It was written by Moore and Johnathan McClain, and produced by FilmNation Entertainment. The film was announced in January 2021. In February, Focus Features pre-bought the distribution rights, and Mark Rylance, Zoey Deutch, Dylan O'Brien, and Johnny Flynn joined the cast. In April, Simon Russell Beale and Nikki Amuka-Bird were added to the cast. Principal photography began on March 5, 2021 at Troubadour Wembley Park Theatre near London, England, with cinematographer Dick Pope. Filming wrapped in early April. During post-production, editing was completed by William Goldenberg and the musical score was composed by Alexandre Desplat.

== Release ==
The film premiered at the 2022 Berlin International Film Festival on February 14, 2022. It was theatrically released in the United States on March 18, 2022, after being postponed from its original February 25 date. It was released on streaming on April 8, 2022 by Peacock, and on Blu-ray and DVD on May 3, 2022 by Universal Pictures Home Entertainment.

== Reception ==
=== Box office ===
In the United States and Canada, The Outfit was released alongside Jujutsu Kaisen 0, Umma, and X, and was projected to gross $750,000–2.5 million from 1,324 theaters in its opening weekend. It earned $1.5 million in its opening weekend, finishing eighth. Men made up 56% of the audience during its opening, with those above the age of 35 comprising 60% of ticket sales and those above 45 comprising 40%. The audiences' ethnic breakdown was 60% were Caucasian, 15% Hispanic and Latino Americans, 10% African American, and 15% Asian or other. The film dropped out of the box office top ten in its second weekend, finishing twelfth with $568,180.

=== Critical response ===
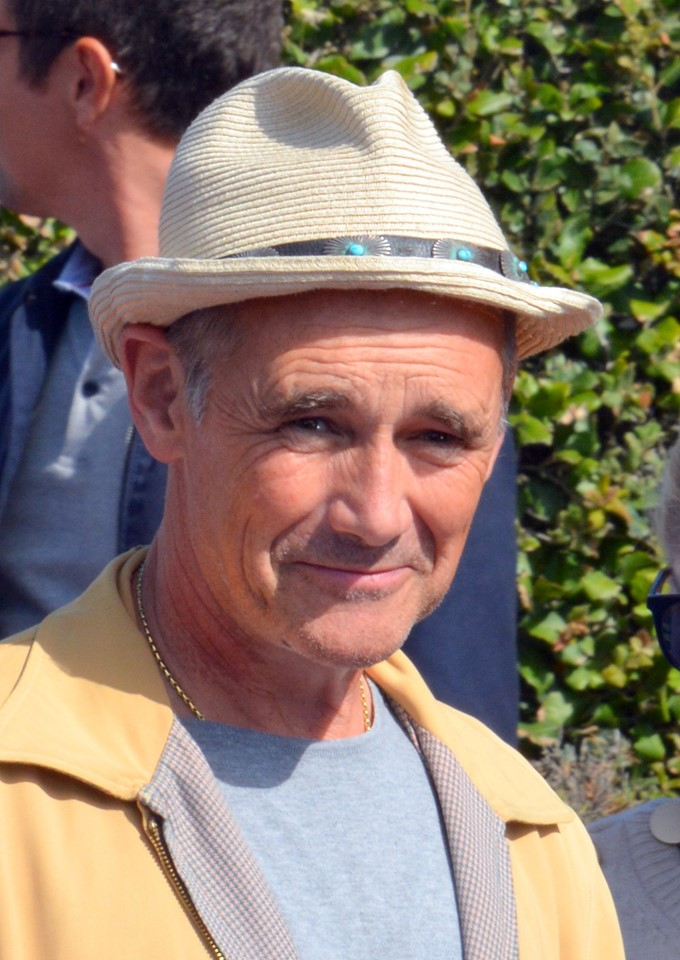
Mark Rylance received praise for his performance.

On the review aggregator website Rotten Tomatoes, 86% of 173 critics' reviews are positive, with an average rating of 7.4/10. The website's consensus reads: "The Outfit isn't flashy, but a solid story and Mark Rylance's tightly tailored performance make this a comfortable fit for fans of old-school thrillers." Metacritic, which uses a weighted average, assigned the film a score of 69 out of 100, based on 39 critics, indicating "generally favorable" reviews. Audiences polled by PostTrak gave the film a 74% positive score, with 55% saying they would definitely recommend it.

The performances of the cast, especially Rylance's, were well received. Critics gave positive notes to the costume and production design, cinematography, score, and Moore's screenplay. Deadline Hollywood's Pete Hammond said Moore had "crafted a literate and thrilling gangster picture that brings a fresh touch to a well-worn genre".
