= John Healy (author) =

Writer and tournament chess player

John Healy (born 1943) is a writer and former tournament chess player.

== Early life and personal life ==
He was born in London in 1943 to Irish immigrant parents in London's Kentish Town. Leaving school at the age of 14, he spent his formative years in the army, where he had a successful boxing career. Dishonourably discharged for drunkenness, resisting the guard and going absent without leave, Healy began a downward spiral that brought him into the subculture of London's homeless street drinkers. He spent fifteen years as a homeless alcoholic and was convicted of many petty crimes during this time.

== Chess ==
While serving his last prison sentence in Pentonville prison, Healy learned the game of chess from his cellmate Harry Collins, a burglar otherwise known as The Brighton Fox. Finding that he had a special aptitude for the game, he decided to give up drinking and with the help of his former Probation Officer, Clive Soley (now Clive Soley, Baron Soley), he made his first moves back into normal life. He has remained sober since.

His chess career continued for ten years and despite the ravages of his years spent on the streets he became a highly rated player, capable of playing four games simultaneously whilst wearing a blindfold and several games simultaneously with sight of the boards.

In 2010, his book "Coffeehouse Chess Tactics" was published by the well-known chess publishing house New in Chess, and was shortlisted for the Guardian Chess Book of the Year.

== The Grass Arena ==
Having given up his ambition of becoming a Grandmaster, Healy retired from tournament chess and began to write his life story, which was published in 1988 by Faber and Faber. The Grass Arena was instantly recognised as a classic of the memoir genre, and won many awards including the J. R. Ackerley Award for Literary Autobiography. This was the first book in the history of the prize to win the award outright.

== Film ==
In 1990 Healy's autobiography was adapted into a film of the same name that won many major international awards, including the inaugural Michael Powell Award for Best British Feature at the Edinburgh Film Festival.

A documentary about Healy's life and work, titled Barbaric Genius, directed by Paul Duane and produced by Screenworks Film and TV premiered at the Jameson Dublin International Film Festival in 2011. It was nominated for the 2012 Grierson Documentary Award.

== Dispute ==
Following a dispute with Faber and Faber in 1991, the book was taken out of print in the UK, and remained so until 2008 when it was republished as a Penguin Classic. It remained in print, however, in France, where it is published by Gallimard.

The Grass Arena was republished in 2008 with a new introduction by actor Daniel Day-Lewis.

== Bibliography ==
- The Grass Arena: An Autobiography by John Healy Published by Faber & Faber (1988) ISBN 978-0-571-15170-7
- Streets Above Us by John Healy Published by Macmillan (1990) ISBN 978-0-333-52349-0
- Coffeehouse Chess Tactics by John Healy Published by New In Chess (2010) ISBN 978-9-056-91328-1
- The Metal Mountain by John Healy Published by Etruscan Books (2019) ISBN 978-1-901538-89-2
