= Graham Moore (filmmaker) =

American filmmaker and author (born 1981)

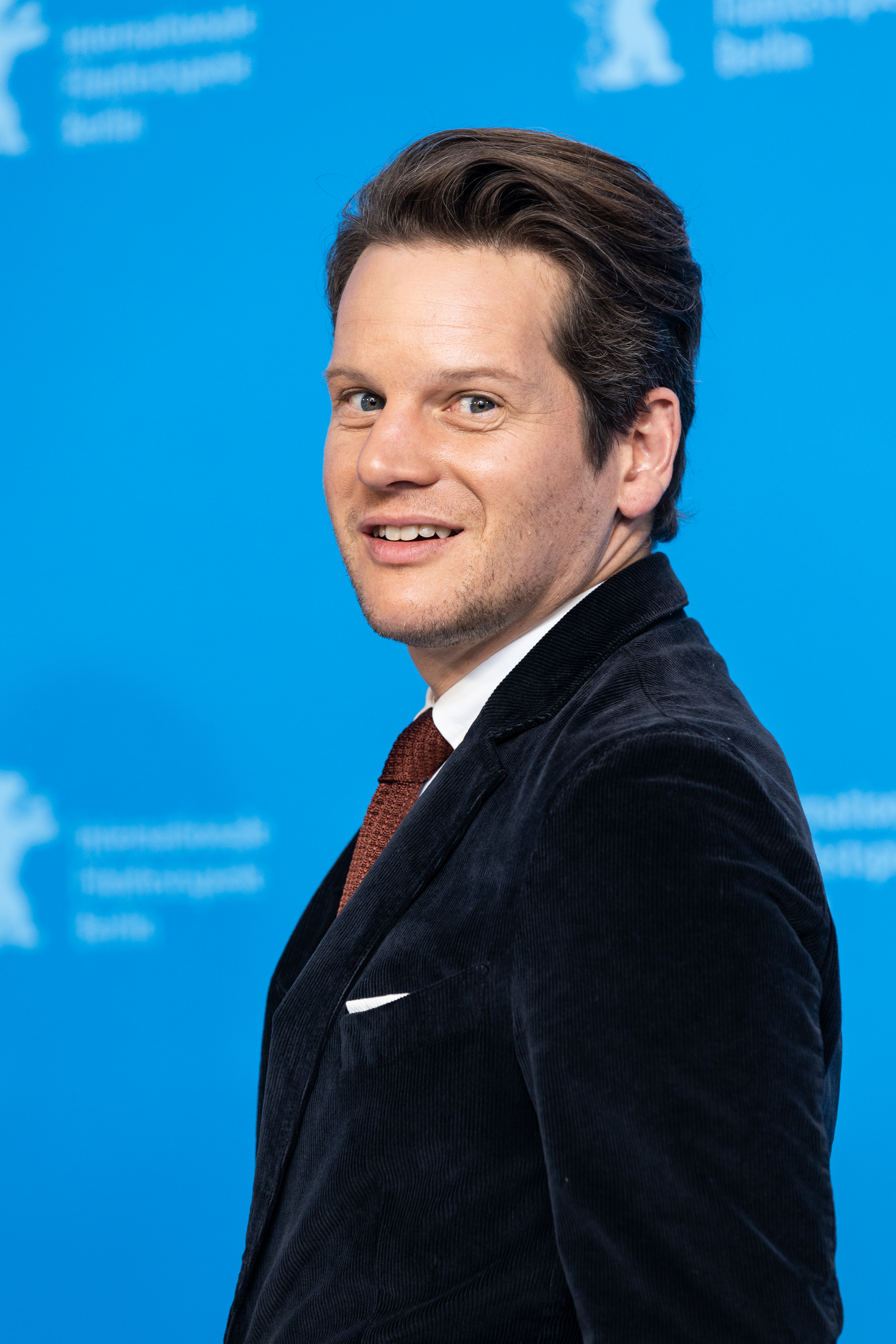
- Moore in 2022
- Born: October 18, 1981 (age 45); Chicago, Illinois, U.S.
- Education: Columbia University
- Occupations: Filmmaker, author
- Website: mrgrahammoore.com

Graham Moore (born October 18, 1981) is an American filmmaker and author. He wrote the screenplay for the historical film The Imitation Game (2014), which topped the 2011 Black List and won the Academy Award for Best Adapted Screenplay. He made his directorial debut with thriller film The Outfit (2022) which he also co-wrote. In addition, Moore created the limited series The Altruists for Netflix in 2026.

== Early life and family ==
Moore was born in Chicago, Illinois and raised on the city's north side. He is "the son of two lawyers who divorced and then married two other lawyers"; Moore's father, Gary Moore, is an insurance defense attorney and his mother, Susan Sher (née Steiner), works for the University of Chicago. His mother was formerly the City of Chicago's chief lawyer and First Lady Michelle Obama's chief of staff.

Moore's parents divorced when he was young. Moore's stepfather is Cook County Circuit Court Judge Neil Cohen. Raised Jewish, Moore graduated from the University of Chicago Laboratory Schools in 1999 and received a Bachelor of Arts degree in religious history in 2003 from Columbia University.

During his Academy Award acceptance speech in February 2015, Moore stated:

When I was 16 years old, I tried to kill myself because I felt weird and I felt different, and I felt like I did not belong. And now I'm standing here, and so I would like this moment to be for this kid out there who feels like she's weird or she's different or she doesn't fit in anywhere: Yes, you do. I promise you do. Stay weird, stay different.

Moore lives in Los Angeles, California. He married in 2019 and together they have a child.

== Career ==
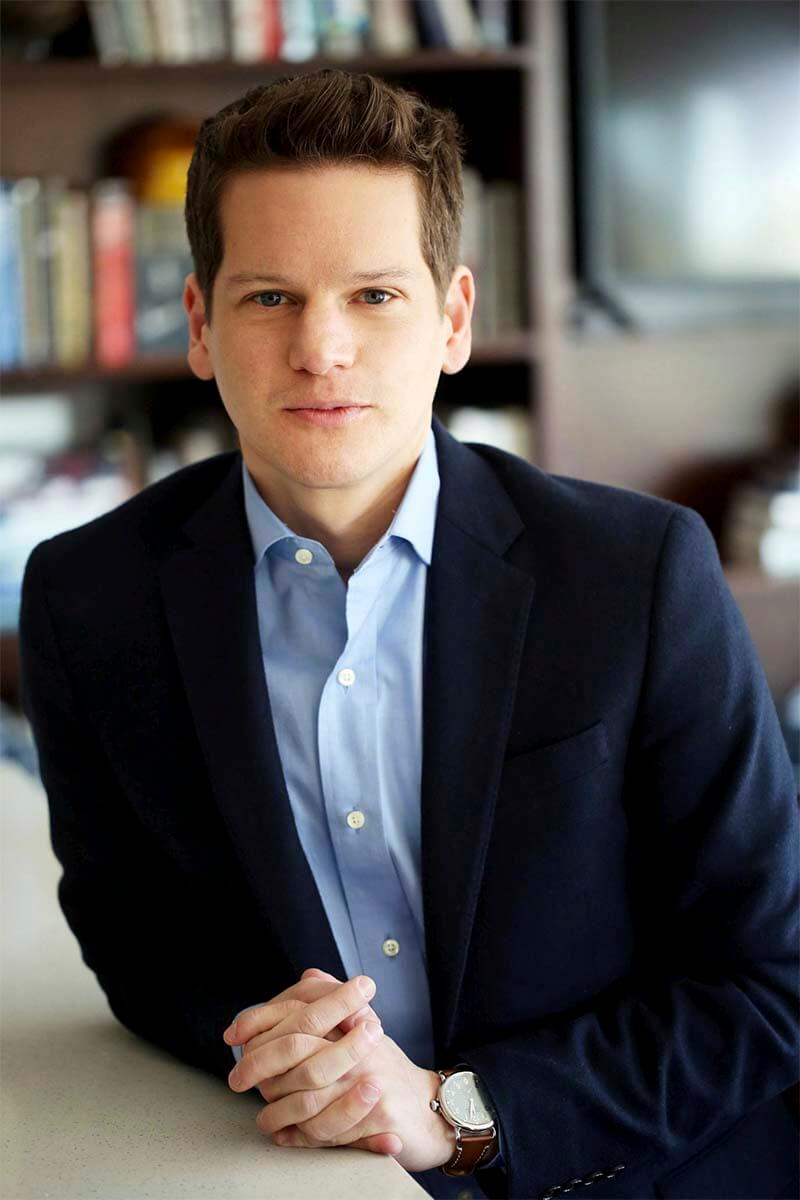
Moore in 2016

Moore began his writing career working with childhood friend Ben Epstein, who was attending Tisch School of the Arts in New York City. One of his earliest Hollywood jobs was on the writing staff of the short-lived television series 10 Things I Hate About You.

Moore's first book, The Sherlockian, was on the New York Times bestseller list for three weeks.

His adapted screenplay for the 2014 film The Imitation Game, based on the biography Alan Turing: The Enigma by Andrew Hodges, topped the 2011 Black List of the best unproduced scripts in Hollywood. The script earned Moore numerous nominations, including the 2014 Golden Globe Award for Best Screenplay, and ultimately won the 2014 Academy Award for Best Adapted Screenplay at the 87th Academy Awards (awarded February 2015).

Moore's second book, The Last Days of Night, was published by Random House on August 16, 2016. Set in 1888 New York City, the novel focuses on the heated rivalry between Thomas Edison and George Westinghouse during the advent of electricity and is told through the eyes of Westinghouse's attorney, Paul Cravath. Moore has adapted the screenplay for The Last Days of Night to be directed by Oscar-nominated director of The Imitation Game Morten Tyldum. Moore will write, direct, and produce the sci-fi thriller Naked Is the Best Disguise for Studio 8.

His third book, The Holdout, follows Maya Seale, who finds herself the prime suspect when one of her fellow trial jurors is found dead, ten years after they took part in a controversial verdict.

Moore's first film as director, The Outfit, premiered at the 72nd Berlin International Film Festival on February 14, 2022. It received positive reviews.

As of 2023, his book The Holdout, was being considered for an adaptation.

== Bibliography ==
- The Sherlockian (2010), published by Twelve
- The Last Days of Night (August 16, 2016), published by Penguin Random House
- The Holdout (February 18, 2020), published by Random House
- The Wealth of Shadows (May 21, 2024), published by Random House.

== Filmography ==
Short film

Year	Title	Director	Writer	Producer	Ref.
2005	Pirates vs. Ninjas	No	Yes	Yes	
2008	The Waiting Room	Yes	Yes	Yes	

Feature film

Year	Title	Director	Writer	Executive Producer	Ref.
2014	The Imitation Game	No	Yes	Yes	
2022	The Outfit	Yes	Yes	No	

Television series

Year	Title	Director	Writer	Creator	Executive Producer	Notes	Ref.
2010	10 Things I Hate About You	No	Yes	No	No	Episode: "Meat is Murder"	
2026	The Altruists	Yes	Yes	Yes	Yes		

== Awards and nominations ==
Year	Award	Category	Nominated work	Result	Ref.
2011	Anthony Awards	Best First Novel	The Sherlockian	Won	
2014	British Independent Film Awards	Best Screenplay	The Imitation Game	Nominated	
2014	Washington D.C. Area Film Critics Association Awards	Best Adapted Screenplay	The Imitation Game	Nominated	
2014	San Francisco Film Critics Circle Award	Best Adapted Screenplay	The Imitation Game	Nominated	
2014	Chicago Film Critics Association	Best Adapted Screenplay	The Imitation Game	Nominated	
2015	Golden Globe Award	Best Screenplay	The Imitation Game	Nominated	
2015	Critics' Choice Movie Awards	Best Adapted Screenplay	The Imitation Game	Nominated	
2015	AACTA International Awards	Best Screenplay	The Imitation Game	Nominated	
2015	USC Scripter Award	Best Adapted Screenplay	The Imitation Game	Won	
2015	British Academy Film Awards	Best Adapted Screenplay	The Imitation Game	Nominated	
2015	Writers Guild of America Awards	Best Adapted Screenplay	The Imitation Game	Won	
2015	Satellite Awards	Best Adapted Screenplay	The Imitation Game	Won	
2015	Academy Awards	Best Adapted Screenplay	The Imitation Game	Won	
2015	PEN Center USA	Best Screenplay	The Imitation Game	Won	
2016	The Washington Post	Notable fiction in 2016	The Last Days of Night	Nominated	
2017	American Library Association	Year's best in genre fiction for adult readers	The Last Days of Night	Nominated	
