= 2020 Laurence Olivier Awards =

Award ceremony

- Date: 25 October 2020
- Location: London Palladium
- Hosted by: Jason Manford
- Most wins: & Juliet / Dear Evan Hansen / Emilia (3)
- Most nominations: & Juliet (9)

Television/radio coverage
- Network: ITV (television); Magic (radio)

The 2020 Laurence Olivier Awards was held on 25 October 2020 at the London Palladium and hosted by Jason Manford, who presented all of the awards except Special Recognition.

The Oliviers were originally scheduled to be held on 5 April 2020 at the Royal Albert Hall with Manford as host, but was cancelled on 17 March due to the COVID-19 pandemic in the United Kingdom.

== Event calendar ==
- 12 January: Jason Manford announced as host
- 14 February: Jo Hawes, Thelma Holt, Stephen Jameson, Sarah Preece and Peter Roberts are announced as the recipients of the Special Recognition Award
- 3 March: Nominations announced
- 6 March: Don Black is announced as a recipient of the Special Award
- 17 March: Award ceremony cancelled
- ~~5 April: Award ceremony originally scheduled~~
- 28 September: Award ceremony rescheduled
- 21 October: Ian McKellen is announced as a recipient of the Special Award
- 25 October: Award ceremony aired

== Eligibility ==
Any new production that opened between 20 February 2019 and 18 February 2020 in a theatre represented in membership of Society of London Theatre is eligible for consideration, provided it ran for the minimum amount of performances required for that category. The below are all productions eligible for the main theatre categories.

- & Juliet – Shaftesbury Theatre
- A Very Expensive Poison – Old Vic
- Admissions – Trafalgar Studios 1
- All My Sons – Old Vic
- Amélie – Other Palace
- Anna – National Theatre Dorfman
- The Antipodes – National Theatre Dorfman
- Appropriate – Donmar Warehouse
- As You Like It – Barbican Theatre
- Be More Chill – Other Palace
- Betrayal – Harold Pinter Theatre
- Big – Dominion Theatre
- Bitter Wheat – Garrick Theatre
- Blank – Donmar Warehouse
- Blood Wedding – Young Vic
- Botticelli in the Fire – Hampstead Theatre
- Captain Corelli's Mandolin – Harold Pinter Theatre
- Curtains – Wyndham's Theatre
- Cyrano de Bergerac – Playhouse Theatre
- A Day in the Death of Joe Egg – Trafalgar Studios 1
- Dear Evan Hansen – Noël Coward Theatre
- Death of a Salesman – Young Vic and Piccadilly Theatre
- Death of England – National Theatre Dorfman
- The Doctor – Almeida Theatre
- Downstate – National Theatre Dorfman
- The Duchess of Malfi – Almeida Theatre
- Education, Education, Education – Trafalgar Studios 1
- Emilia – Vaudeville Theatre
- The End of History – Jerwood Downstairs, Royal Court
- Endgame and Rough for Theatre II – Old Vic
- Equus – Trafalgar Studios 1
- Europe – Donmar Warehouse
- Evita – Regent's Park Open Air Theatre
- Fairview – Young Vic
- Faith, Hope and Charity – National Theatre Dorfman
- Falsettos – Other Palace
- Fame – Peacock Theatre
- Far Away – Donmar Warehouse
- Fiddler on the Roof – Playhouse Theatre
- Fleabag – Wyndham's Theatre
- The Girl on the Train – Duke of York's Theatre
- Goldilocks and the Three Bears – London Palladium
- Groan Ups – Vaudeville Theatre
- Hansard – National Theatre Lyttelton
- The Haystack – Hampstead Theatre
- The Henriad: Henry IV (parts 1) and 2) and Henry V – Globe
- The Hunt – Almeida Theatre
- The Illusionists – Shaftesbury Theatre
- Jesus Hopped the 'A' Train – Young Vic
- Joseph and the Amazing Technicolor Dreamcoat – London Palladium
- Jude – Hampstead Theatre
- A Kind of People – Jerwood Downstairs, Royal Court
- The King of Hell's Palace – Hampstead Theatre
- Kunene and the King – Ambassadors Theatre
- Leopoldstadt – Wyndham's Theatre
- Lungs – Old Vic
- Magic Goes Wrong – Vaudeville Theatre
- The Man in the White Suit – Wyndham's Theatre
- Mary Poppins – Prince Edward Theatre
- Master Harold and the Boys – National Theatre Lyttelton
- Measure for Measure – Barbican Theatre
- The Merry Wives of Windsor – Globe
- A Midsummer Night's Dream – Globe
- A Midsummer Night's Dream – Regent's Park Open Air Theatre
- My Brilliant Friend – National Theatre Olivier
- The Night of the Iguana – Noël Coward Theatre
- Noises Off – Garrick Theatre
- Nora: A Doll's House – Young Vic
- The Ocean at the End of the Lane – National Theatre Dorfman
- On Bear Ridge – Jerwood Downstairs, Royal Court
- On Your Feet – London Coliseum
- Peter Gynt – National Theatre Olivier
- The Phlebotomist – Hampstead Theatre
- Present Laughter – Old Vic
- Ravens: Spassky vs. Fischer – Hampstead Theatre
- Richard II – Sam Wanamaker Playhouse
- Richard III – Sam Wanamaker Playhouse
- Rosmersholm – Duke of York's Theatre
- Rutherford and Son – National Theatre Lyttelton
- The Secret Diary of Adrian Mole, Aged 13¾ – Ambassadors Theatre
- Small Island – National Theatre Olivier
- The Son – Duke of York's Theatre
- The Starry Messenger – Wyndham's Theatre
- Sweet Charity – Donmar Warehouse
- Swive (Elizabeth) – Sam Wanamaker Playhouse
- The Taming of the Shrew – Barbican Theatre
- The Taming of the Shrew – Sam Wanamaker Playhouse
- Tartuffe – National Theatre Lyttelton
- Teenage Dick – Donmar Warehouse
- This Is Going to Hurt – Garrick Theatre
- Three Sisters – Almeida Theatre
- Three Sisters – National Theatre Lyttelton
- Toast – Other Palace
- Top Girls – National Theatre Lyttelton
- Touching the Void – Duke of York's Theatre
- Translations – National Theatre Olivier
- Tree – Young Vic
- Uncle Vanya – Harold Pinter Theatre
- The Upstart Crow – Gielgud Theatre
- Vassa – Almeida Theatre
- The Visit – National Theatre Olivier
- Waitress – Adelphi Theatre
- The Wedding Singer – Troubadour Wembley Park Theatre
- The Welkin – National Theatre Lyttelton
- White Christmas – Dominion Theatre
- White Pearl – Jerwood Downstairs, Royal Court

== Winners and nominees ==
The nominations were announced on 3 March 2020 in 26 categories. The winners were announced during the ceremony.

Best New Play	Best New Musical
Leopoldstadt by Tom Stoppard – Wyndham's Theatre; A Very Expensive Poison by Lucy Prebble (based on original text by Luke Harding) – Old Vic; The Doctor by Robert Icke (based on original text by Arthur Schnitzler) – Almeida Theatre; The Ocean at the End of the Lane by Joel Horwood (based on original text by Neil Gaiman) – National Theatre Dorfman	Dear Evan Hansen – Noël Coward Theatre; & Juliet – Shaftesbury Theatre; Amélie – Other Palace; Waitress – Adelphi Theatre
Best Revival	Best Musical Revival
Cyrano de Bergerac – Playhouse Theatre; Death of a Salesman – Young Vic and Piccadilly Theatre; Present Laughter – Old Vic; Rosmersholm – Duke of York's Theatre	Fiddler on the Roof – Playhouse Theatre; Evita – Regent's Park Open Air Theatre; Joseph and the Amazing Technicolor Dreamcoat – London Palladium; Mary Poppins – Prince Edward Theatre
Best Entertainment or Comedy Play	Best Family Show
Emilia by Morgan Lloyd Malcolm – Vaudeville Theatre; Fleabag by Phoebe Waller-Bridge – Wyndham's Theatre; Magic Goes Wrong by Henry Lewis, Penn Jillette, Jonathan Sayer, Henry Shields and Teller – Vaudeville Theatre; The Upstart Crow by Ben Elton – Gielgud Theatre	The Worst Witch – Vaudeville Theatre; Mr Gum and the Dancing Bear – National Theatre Dorfman; Oi Frog and Friends – Lyric Theatre; To the Moon and Back – Barbican Theatre
Best Actor	Best Actress
Andrew Scott as Garry Essendine in Present Laughter – Old Vic; Toby Jones as Vanya Petrovich Voynitsky in Uncle Vanya – Harold Pinter Theatre; James McAvoy as Cyrano de Bergerac in Cyrano de Bergerac – Playhouse Theatre; Wendell Pierce as Willy Loman in Death of a Salesman – Young Vic and Piccadilly Theatre	Sharon D. Clarke as Linda Loman in Death of a Salesman – Young Vic and Piccadilly Theatre; Hayley Atwell as Rebecca West in Rosmersholm – Duke of York's Theatre; Juliet Stevenson as Ruth Wolff in The Doctor – Almeida Theatre; Phoebe Waller-Bridge as Fleabag in Fleabag – Wyndham's Theatre
Best Actor in a Musical	Best Actress in a Musical
Sam Tutty as Evan Hansen in Dear Evan Hansen – Noël Coward Theatre; Andy Nyman as Tevye in Fiddler on the Roof – Playhouse Theatre; Charlie Stemp as Bert in Mary Poppins – Prince Edward Theatre; Jac Yarrow as Joseph in Joseph and the Amazing Technicolor Dreamcoat – London Palladium	Miriam-Teak Lee as Juliet Capulet in & Juliet – Shaftesbury Theatre; Audrey Brisson as Amélie in Amélie – Other Palace; Judy Kuhn as Golde in Fiddler on the Roof – Playhouse Theatre; Zizi Strallen as Mary Poppins in Mary Poppins – Prince Edward Theatre
Best Actor in a Supporting Role	Best Actress in a Supporting Role
Adrian Scarborough as Hermann Merz in Leopoldstadt – Wyndham's Theatre; Arinzé Kene as Biff Loman in Death of a Salesman – Young Vic and Piccadilly Theatre; Colin Morgan as Chris Keller in All My Sons – Old Vic; Reece Shearsmith as The President and Jon in A Very Expensive Poison – Old Vic	Indira Varma as Liz Essendine in Present Laughter – Old Vic; Michele Austin as Leila Ragueneau in Cyrano de Bergerac – Playhouse Theatre; Sophie Thompson as Monica Reed in Present Laughter – Old Vic; Josie Walker as Old Mrs Hempstock in The Ocean at the End of the Lane – National Theatre Dorfman
Best Actor in a Supporting Role in a Musical	Best Actress in a Supporting Role in a Musical
David Bedella as Lance in & Juliet – Shaftesbury Theatre; Stewart Clarke as Perchik in Fiddler on the Roof – Playhouse Theatre; Jack Loxton as Jared Kleinman in Dear Evan Hansen – Noël Coward Theatre; Rupert Young as Larry Murphy in Dear Evan Hansen – Noël Coward Theatre	Cassidy Janson as Anne Hathaway in & Juliet – Shaftesbury Theatre; Lucy Anderson as Zoe Murphy in Dear Evan Hansen – Noël Coward Theatre; Petula Clark as Bird Woman in Mary Poppins – Prince Edward Theatre; Lauren Ward as Cynthia Murphy in Dear Evan Hansen – Noël Coward Theatre
Best Director	Best Theatre Choreographer
Miranda Cromwell and Marianne Elliott for Death of a Salesman – Young Vic and Piccadilly Theatre; Jamie Lloyd for Cyrano de Bergerac – Playhouse Theatre; Trevor Nunn for Fiddler on the Roof – Playhouse Theatre; Ian Rickson for Uncle Vanya – Harold Pinter Theatre	Matthew Bourne and Stephen Mear for Mary Poppins – Prince Edward Theatre; Fabian Aloise for Evita – Regent's Park Open Air Theatre; Matt Cole (based on original choreography by Jerome Robbins) for Fiddler on the Roof – Playhouse Theatre; Jennifer Weber for & Juliet – Shaftesbury Theatre
Best Set Design	Best Costume Design
Bob Crowley for Mary Poppins – Prince Edward Theatre; Soutra Gilmour for & Juliet – Shaftesbury Theatre; Rae Smith for Rosmersholm – Duke of York's Theatre; Rae Smith for Uncle Vanya – Harold Pinter Theatre	Joanna Scotcher for Emilia – Vaudeville Theatre; Hugh Durrant for Goldilocks and the Three Bears – London Palladium; Jonathan Lipman for Fiddler on the Roof – Playhouse Theatre; Paloma Young for & Juliet – Shaftesbury Theatre
Best Lighting Design	Best Sound Design
Paule Constable for The Ocean at the End of the Lane – National Theatre Dorfman; Neil Austin for Rosmersholm – Duke of York's Theatre; Howard Hudson for & Juliet – Shaftesbury Theatre; Bruno Poet for Uncle Vanya – Harold Pinter Theatre	Emma Laxton for Emilia – Vaudeville Theatre; Gregory Clarke for Rosmersholm – Duke of York's Theatre; Ben Ringham and Max Ringham for Anna – National Theatre Dorfman; Ben Ringham and Max Ringham for Cyrano de Bergerac – Playhouse Theatre
Best Original Score or New Orchestrations
Alex Lacamoire for orchestrating and Benj Pasek and Justin Paul for scoring and lyricising Dear Evan Hansen – Noël Coward Theatre; Sara Bareilles for scoring and lyricising Waitress – Adelphi Theatre; Jason Carr for orchestrating Fiddler on the Roof – Playhouse Theatre; Dominic Fallacaro and Bill Sherman for orchestrating & Juliet – Shaftesbury Theatre; Barnaby Race for music supervising and arranging Amélie – Other Palace
Best New Dance Production	Outstanding Achievement in Dance
Ingoma by Mthuthuzeli November, Ballet Black – Linbury Theatre, Royal Opera House; La Fiesta by Israel Galván – Sadler's Wells; Mám by Michael Keegan-Dolan, Teaċ Daṁsa – Sadler's Wells; Vessel by Damien Jalet and Kohei Nawa – Sadler's Wells	Sara Baras for choreographing and performing Ballet Flamenco Sombras – Sadler's Wells; Anne Teresa De Keersmaeker for performing Mitten wir im Leben sind/Bach6Cellosuiten – Sadler's Wells; Gisèle Vienne for choreographing Crowd, Dance Umbrella – Sadler's Wells
Best New Opera Production	Outstanding Achievement in Opera
Billy Budd – Royal Opera House; Berenice – Linbury Theatre, Royal Opera House; Hansel and Gretel – Regent's Park Open Air Theatre; Noye's Fludde – Theatre Royal Stratford East	The Children's Ensemble for performing Noye's Fludde – Theatre Royal Stratford East; Martyn Brabbins and James Henshaw for conducting The Mask of Orpheus, English National Opera – London Coliseum; The Jette Parker Young Artists for performing Berenice, Death in Venice and Phaedra – Royal Opera House
Outstanding Achievement in an Affiliate Theatre
Baby Reindeer – Bush Theatre; Blues in the Night – Kiln Theatre; Our Lady of Kibeho – Theatre Royal Stratford East; Seven Methods of Killing Kylie Jenner – Jerwood Upstairs, Royal Court; Warheads – Park Theatre
Special Award	Special Recognition Award
Don Black; Ian McKellen	Jo Hawes; Thelma Holt; Stephen Jameson and Sarah Preece; Peter Roberts

== Productions with multiple wins and nominations ==
=== Multiple wins ===
The following 7 productions received multiple awards:

- 3: & Juliet, Dear Evan Hansen, Emilia
- 2: Death of a Salesman, Leopoldstadt, Mary Poppins, Present Laughter

=== Multiple nominations ===
The following 19 productions and 2 operas received multiple nominations:

- 9: & Juliet
- 8: Fiddler on the Roof
- 7: Dear Evan Hansen
- 6: Mary Poppins
- 5: Cyrano de Bergerac, Death of a Salesman, Rosmersholm
- 4: Present Laughter, Uncle Vanya
- 3: Amélie, Emilia
- 2: A Very Expensive Poison, Berenice, The Doctor, Evita, Fleabag, Joseph and the Amazing Technicolor Dreamcoat, Leopoldstadt, Noye's Fludde, The Ocean at the End of the Lane, Waitress

== See also ==
- 74th Tony Awards - equivalent awards for Broadway theatre productions
