= Keziah Joseph =

British actress (born 1992)

- Born: 12 August 1992 (age 34); Hammersmith, London
- Education: Academy of Live and Recorded Arts; Royal Central School of Speech and Drama
- Occupations: Actress; playwright

Keziah Joseph (/kɛˈzaɪə/, born 12 August 1992 in Hammersmith, London) is a British actress who trained at The Royal Central School of Speech and Drama. She won the BBC Carleton Hobbs Bursary in 2016.

== Education ==
Joseph attended a foundation course in acting at the Academy of Live and Recorded Arts in 2012/13 before enrolling at the Royal Central School of Speech and Drama in 2013. She graduated with a Bachelor of Arts in Acting with specialism in Collaborative and Devised Theatre in 2016.

== Career ==
=== Acting ===
Joseph made her professional theatre debut in Sandi Toksvig's Silver Lining in 2017 and has gone on to work prolifically in theatre across the UK. She played Bibi - a fictional NHS nurse - and Betsy - a real African American enslaved woman experimented on by J Marion Sims in the 1800s, in the award-winning play Family Tree by Mojisola Adebayo, directed by Matthew Xia (2021 and reprised in 2023). In 2021 she also played Tia in the award-winning Wayward Productions/Complicité play Language of Kindness adapted from the novel of the same name by Christie Watson. She played Lucy Pevensie in Sally Cookson's The Lion the Witch and the Wardrobe (2019) at The Bridge Theatre alongside Wil Johnson as Aslan and Laura Elphinstone as the White Witch. She played Polly in the Olivier-nominated Mr Gum and the Dancing Bear (2019) at the National Theatre alongside Steve Furst and Gary Wilmot, adapted from the best selling children's books of the same title by Andy Stanton.

=== Voice acting ===
Joseph is a member of BBC Radio Drama Company and has appeared in many radio plays broadcast on Radio 4 and Radio 3. She played Fran in Audible's original audio play Crush Hour alongside Ellie Goulding and Rory Kinnear (2022). She currently plays Sheila in BBC Radio 4 Drama series Faith, Hope and Glory, written by Roy Williams.

=== Playwriting ===
Joseph began writing plays in 2021 and her first short play, Vanitina won an open call to be published in German magazine, DRAMA MAGAZIN. It was printed and sold in Berlin in 2022.

== Accolades ==
In 2016 she received the BBC Carleton Hobbs Bursary Award, and was a Spotlight Prize nominee.

Joseph would star in the play Language of Kindness, and it received the 2022 Offie for IDEA production (IDEA standing for Innovative, Devised, Experiential and Atypical).

== Credits ==
=== Stage ===
Year	Title	Role(s)	Venue(s)/Production	Notes and refs
2017	Silver Lining, by Sandi Toksvig	Hope Daley	Rose Theatre Kingston and UK tour	
2017	Kanye the First, by Sam Steiner	Eve / Kim	HighTide Festival	
2017-2018	The Jungle Book, adapted by Jessica Swale	Mowgli	Royal and Derngate and UK tour	
2018	As You Like It	Celia	Regent's Park Open Air Theatre	
2018-2019	Dick Whittington	Tom Cat	Lyric Hammersmith	
2018-2019	The Paper Man	Performer	Norfolk & Norwich Festival and La Strada Festival in Graz, Austria (2018); Tobacco Factory Theatre, Bristol and Soho Theatre, London (2019)	Also a co-creator of the show.
2019	Sweeney Todd	Johanna Barker	Everyman Theatre, Liverpool	
2019	Mr Gum and the Dancing Bear - the Musical!	Polly	Dorfman Theatre	
2019	The Lion, the Witch, and the Wardrobe	Lucy	Bridge Theatre	
2021	The Language of Kindness, adapted by Sasha Milavic Davies	Ensemble	Shoreditch Town Hall	
2021-2023	Family Tree, by Mojisola Adebayo	Bibi / Betsy	Greenwich+Docklands International Festival (2021), Young Vic (2022) and UK tour (2023)	
2023-24	The Wind in the Willows	Ratty	Shakespeare North	
2024	The Women of Llanrumney	Cerys	Sherman Theatre	

=== Audio and radio plays ===
Year	Title	Role(s)	Station/Network	Notes and refs
2016	The Archers	Dorothy	BBC Radio 4	3 episodes
2016	The Confidential Agent; Adapted by Nick Perry	Elsie Griffiths	BBC Radio 4	
2016	The Watership Down	Cowslip (episode 1); Nelthilta (episode 2)	BBC Radio 4	
2016	Wild Things; By Charlotte Jones	Cassie	BBC Radio 4	
2016	Northanger Abbey; Adapted by Hattie Naylor	Harriet	BBC Radio 4	Episodes 9 and 10
2017	The Thickness; By Daniel Lawrence Taylor	Lyeasha	BBC Radio 4	
2017	Agnes Grey; Adapted by Rachel Joyce and Tracy Neale	Rosalie	BBC Radio 4	
2017	Assata Shakur - The FBI's Most Wanted Woman; By debbie tucker green	Student 2 (episode 2); Prisoner 3 (episode 4)	BBC Radio 4	
2017	Doctor Who: The Tenth Doctor Adventures	Lorna	Big Finish Productions	Volume 2, Episode 3 ("Cold Vengeance")
2017	The Mother; By Florian Zeller, translated by Christopher Hampton	The girl	BBC Radio 4	
2021	Don Juan; Adapted by Robin Brooks	Gulbeyaz	BBC Radio 3	
2022	Crush Hour	Fran	Audible Original	
2022-present	Faith, Hope and Glory; By Roy Williams	Sheila	BBC Radio 4	Recurring role from Series 3
2023	Doctor Who: The Fourth Doctor Adventures	Freya Brett	Big Finish Productions	Series 12, Episode 2 ("Antillia the Lost")

=== Short film ===
Joseph starred as Uche in the 2016 short film Hush, written by Candice Onyeama.

=== Television ===
Year	Title	Role	Network/Channel	Note
2021	Octonauts: Above & Beyond		CBeebies and Netflix	
2025	Testament	Disciple	Angel Studios	1 episode
