= Montepulciano (disambiguation) =

Montepulciano is a town in the province of Siena in southern Tuscany, Italy.

Montepulciano may also refer to:

- Montepulciano (grape), a red Italian wine grape variety
- Montepulciano d'Abruzzo, a red Italian wine made from the Montepulciano grape in the Abruzzo region
- Vino Nobile di Montepulciano, a red Italian wine produced in the town of Montepulciano, Italy

== See also ==
- Club Montepulciano, a former London nightclub
- Lago di Montepulciano, a lake in the Province of Siena, Tuscany, Italy
