= A Monster Calls (play) =

2018 play by Patrick Ness

- Written by: Patrick Ness (novel); Siobhan Dowd (original idea); Adam Peck (writer in the room) devised by the original company
- Based on: A Monster Calls
- Original language: English

Premiere
- Date premiered: 31 May 2018
- Place premiered: Bristol Old Vic

A Monster Calls is a play based on the low fantasy novel of the same name by Patrick Ness, from an original idea by Siobhan Dowd. The play was devised by the original company with Adam Peck as the writer in the room.

== Production history ==
The play opened at the Bristol Old Vic from 31 May to 16 July, before transferring to The Old Vic, London from 7 July to 25 August 2018. The production was directed by Sally Cookson, who is known for directing classic pieces using the devising process, following her productions of Jane Eyre, Peter Pan and La Strada.

The play began a tour of the UK from February 2020 opening at the Chichester Festival Theatre and was due to tour until June 2020 (followed by a run at the Eisenhower Theatre at The Kennedy Center, Washington, D.C. from July 21 to August 9, 2020), however due to the COVID-19 pandemic the remainder of the tour and Washington DC run was cancelled from March 2020.

An archive recording of a performance featuring the original Old Vic cast will be broadcast on YouTube from Friday 5 until Thursday 11 June 2020 as the first part of the Your Old Vic project, showcasing archive performances since Matthew Warchus' became artistic director in 2015.

== Cast and characters ==
Character	Bristol/London (2018)	UK tour (2020)
Conor/lead	Matthew Tennyson	Ammar Duffus
Monster/lead	Stuart Godwin	Keith Gilmore
Mum	Marianne Oldham	Maria Omakinwa
Grandma	Selina Cadell	Kaye Brown
Lily	Witney White	Cora Kirk
Harry/lead	John Leader	Greg Bernstein
Sully	Georgia Frost	Jade Hackett
Anton	Hammed Animashaun	Kel Matsena
Miss Godfrey	Nandi Bhebhe	Sarah Quist
Dad	Felix Hayes	Ewan Wardrop
Mr Marl	Matt Costain	Paul Sockett
Swings	Jonathan Holby	Sam Wood; Raffaella Covino

== Reception ==
The play won the 2019 Olivier Award for Best Entertainment and Family.
