= La Strada (disambiguation) =

La Strada (The Road) is a 1954 Italian drama film.

La Strada may also refer to:

== Stage works based on the film ==
- La Strada (2017 stage adaptation), a play with music
- La Strada (musical), a musical by Lionel Bart

== In rock music ==
- La Strada (band), a rock band

- La strada (album), their album

== Organisations ==
- La Strada International Association, a non-governmental organisation network opposed to human trafficking
