= The Ocean at the End of the Lane (play) =

2019 play by Joel Horwood based on Neil Gaiman's novel

- Poster for the National Theatre production, illustrated by Nico Delort
- Original language: English
- Written by: Joel Horwood
- Based on: 2013 novel The Ocean at the End of the Lane by Neil Gaiman
- Genre: Fantasy; Drama

Premiere
- Date: 11 December 2019
- Place: Dorfman Theatre, National Theatre, London
- Directed by: Katy Rudd

The Ocean at the End of the Lane is a 2019 play based on the 2013 novel of the same name by Neil Gaiman and adapted for the stage by Joel Horwood.

== Production history ==
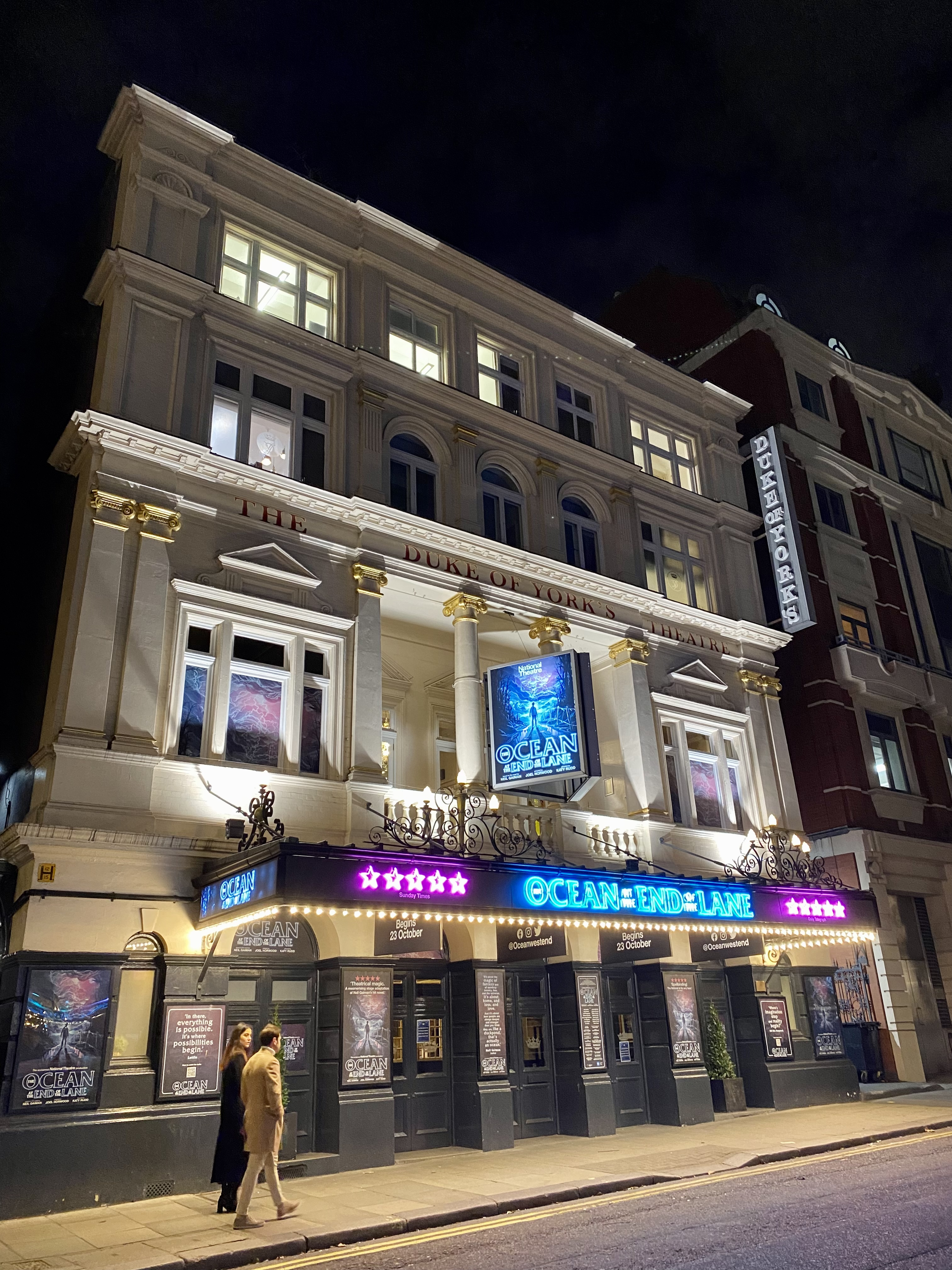
The Ocean at the End of the Lane at the Duke of York's Theatre in October 2021

=== World premiere: National Theatre, London (2019–2020) ===
The play made its world premiere in the Dorfman Theatre at the National Theatre, London with previews beginning on 3 December 2019 (opening night 11 December) running until 25 January 2020. The production is directed by Katy Rudd, set designed by Fly Davis, costume and puppet design by Samuel Wyer, movement direction by Steven Hoggett and composed by Jherek Bischoff

The production received 3 nominations at the 2020 Laurence Olivier Awards for Best New Play, Best Actress in a Supporting Role for Josie Walker and won the award for Best Lighting for Paule Constable.

=== West End (2021–2022) ===
Following the success at the National, the production was announced to transfer to the Duke of York's Theatre in London's West End in autumn 2020, but due to the COVID-19 pandemic the transfer was postponed until 23 October 2021 and ran until 14 May 2022. Casting was unveiled in September 2021.

=== UK and Ireland tour and West End revival (2022-2023) ===
The production toured the UK and Ireland beginning at The Lowry, Salford on 12 December 2022 until October 2023. Casting was unveiled in October 2022.

The production returned to London's West End at the Noël Coward Theatre for a limited run from 11 October to 25 November 2023 featuring the cast from the tour.

== Cast and characters ==
Character	National Theatre	West End	UK and Ireland Tour	West End Revival
Character	2019	2021	2022	2023
Boy	Samuel Blenkin	James Bamford	Keir Ogilvy	Keir Ogilvy
Boy (Alternate)	n/a	Tom Mackley	Daniel Cornish	Daniel Cornish
Lettie Hempstock	Marli Siu	Nia Towle	Millie Hikasa	Millie Hikasa
Ginnie Hempstock	Carlyss Peer	Siubhan Harrison	Kemi-Bo Jacobs	Kemi-Bo Jacobs
Old Mrs Hempstock	Josie Walker	Penny Layden	Finty Williams	Finty Williams
Sis / Ensemble	Jade Croot	Grace Hogg-Robinson	Laurie Ogden	Laurie Ogden
Ursula / Skarthach	Pippa Nixon	Laura Rogers	Charlie Brooks	Charlie Brooks
Dad	Justin Salinger	Nicolas Tennant	Trevor Fox	Trevor Fox
Lodger / Ensemble	Jeff D'Sangalang	Jeff D'Sangalang	Ronnie Lee	Ronnie Lee
Ensemble	Fred Davis; Owain Gwynn; Jess Williams	Ruby Ablett; Emma Bown; Charlie Cameron; Kieran Garland; Miranda Heath; Tom Mackley; Charleen Qwaye; Peter Twose	Emma-Jane Goodwin; Paolo Guidi; Lewis Howard; Aimee McGoldrick; Domonic Ramsden; Joe Rawlinson-Hunt; Risha Silvera; Jasmeen James	

== Reception ==
The play received five star reviews from The Telegraph, Sunday Times, WhatsOnStage, Gay Times and SFX Magazine.

== Awards and nominations ==
=== Original London production ===
Year	Award	Category	Nominee	Result
2020	Laurence Olivier Awards	Best New Play		Nominated
2020	Laurence Olivier Awards	Best Actress in a Supporting Role	Josie Walker	Nominated
2020	Laurence Olivier Awards	Best Lighting Design	Paule Constable	Won
