= Michael Fentiman =

English theatre director

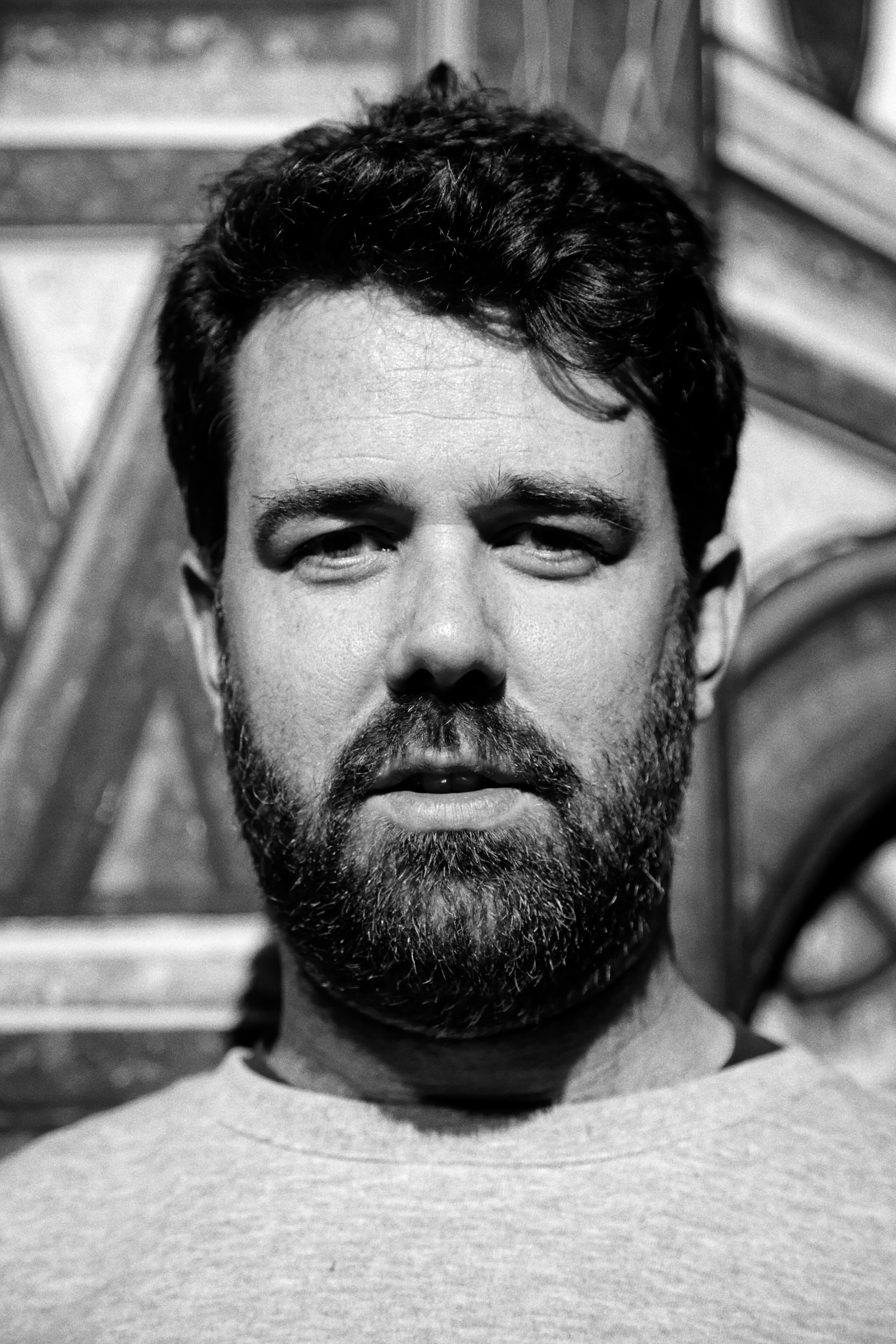
- Michael Fentiman in 2018
- Born: Michael Fentiman; 1 June 1982 (age 44); Harlow, Essex, England
- Education: Mountview Academy of Theatre Arts; Bretton Hall
- Occupation: Theatre director
- Agent: Curtis Brown

Michael Fentiman (born 1 June 1982 at Harlow, Essex, England) is a British theatre director.

Fentiman attended Bretton Hall for three years, where he trained to be an actor, followed by a postgraduate course at Mountview Academy for one year, to be a director.

His directing credits to date (2019) include Titus Andronicus for the RSC, The Importance of being Earnest at the Vaudeville Theatre, Raising Martha and Joe Orton's Loot at the Park Theatre, London, The Last Days of Anne Boleyn (writer and director) for Historic Royal Palaces at the Tower of London, and Amélie the Musical (UK national tour from April 2019)

== Production reviews ==
In 2012, Fentiman with Rupert Goold co-directed The Lion, the Witch and the Wardrobe for a Threesixty 'tented production' in Kensington Gardens, London. It received a Guardian three star review.

Fentiman directed a 2013 production of Titus Andronicus for the RSC at the Swan Theatre, Stratford-upon-Avon. A review by Michael Billington considered Fentiman's production "strong on momentary effects, [but] not exactly a model of intellectual coherence". Charles Spencer in The Daily Telegraph saw this production as "a notable RSC debut" by Fentiman, "with just the right mixture of dark wit and in-your-face violence".

Raising Martha, a farce by David Spicer, was directed by Fentiman in 2017. Lyn Gardner reviewed the production for The Guardian, stating it was "never quite as riotously funny as it should be in a production by Michael Fentiman" and "ends up down a dramatic cul-de-sac" A review by David Fargnoli in The Stage thought the play an "amusing, absurdist black comedy that lacks a cutting edge" More positive reviews were written for the Evening Standard which thought Fentiman's "brisk" production "achieves moments of tension", and by Ann Treneman for The Times, who believed the production was "wild and wacky, outrageously funny, with jokes from the very silly to the subtle and sophisticated"

Fentiman directed Orton's Loot in 2017. His review in The Independent mentioned that the production "reinstates some of the lines that had been censored by the Lord Chamberlain", and was a "stylish and entertaining revival". Dominic Cavendish in The Daily Telegraph believed that "Fentiman has not only found the right venue..., he has got the right cast". Clare Brennan in The Guardian said that "if ever there was a cast to deliver Orton this is it – under Michael Fentiman's direction". Neil Norman in the Sunday Express called Michael Fentiman's production "a masterclass in physical comedy and timing". Michael Billington in The Guardian gave Loot a five-star rating, commenting on the way Fentiman referenced the "shock tactics" in Orton's work.

Fentiman's 2018 The Importance of being Earnest was reviewed less favourably by Billington, who wrote: "Michael Fentiman's coarse production robs Wilde of his decorum, swapping subtleties and satire for screaming and sex" and "never allows the words to do their work". A contrary viewpoint was taken by Alun Hood for WhatsOnStage who believed the production "[throws] fresh ideas at [the play]" and "will likely infuriate as many people as it delights" Henry Hitchins in the Evening Standard mentions Fentiman's "at times racy interpretation [that] suggests the anarchy seething beneath Wilde's polished witticisms". Paul Taylor in The Independent said "Does anybody need Wilde's masterpiece to be ‘decoded’ in this heavy-handed, pseudo-radical way?" Holly Williams in Time Out believed "Fentiman's approach rubbles the structure of an exquisitely formed play." Natasha Tripney in The Stage thought "Fentiman's pantomimic production does it [the play] a disservice".

In October 2022, Fentiman directed Audrey Brisson in Reading Rep Theatre's production of Jekyll & Hyde, Gary McNair's adaptation of Robert Louis Stevenson's novella for solo performance. He directed Forbes Masson in the role of Gabriel John Utterson when the play was staged at the Royal Lyceum Theatre, Edinburgh, in January 2024.

== Awards and nominations ==
Year	Award	Category	Work	Result	Ref.
2021	Grammy Awards	Best Musical Theater Album	Amélie	Nominated	
