= Trenaman =

Trenaman is a surname. Notable people with the surname include:

- Martin Trenaman (born 1961), English actor, comedy writer and performer
- Rachel Trenaman (born 2001), Australian cricketer

== See also ==
- Ann Treneman (born 1956), American journalist
