= The Lion, the Witch, and the Wardrobe (2017 play) =

2017 stage adaptation of the novel

- West End promotional artwork
- Music: Benji Bower; Barnaby Race
- Lyrics: Barnaby Race
- Book: Devised by the original company Adam Peck (writer in the room and Dramaturg)
- Basis: The Lion, the Witch, and the Wardrobe by C. S. Lewis
- Premiere: 29 November 2017: West Yorkshire Playhouse, Leeds
- Productions: 2017 Leeds; 2019 London; 2021 UK tour 2022 West End; 2023 Birmingham; 2024 Leeds

The Lion, The Witch, and The Wardrobe is a stage adaptation of the book of the same name by C. S. Lewis, the first installment of The Chronicles of Narnia. The play was devised by the original company with Adam Peck as the writer in the room.

== Synopsis ==
The play follows the four Pevensie children, Peter, Susan, Edmund, and Lucy, who evacuate wartime London to stay in the countryside, where they find a wardrobe leading to the fantasy world of Narnia. The siblings learn that their arrival was prophesied and they must rally its inhabitants under Aslan to defeat the forces of Jadis, the White Witch.

== Production history ==
=== World premiere: Leeds (2017) ===
The production premiered at the Quarry Theatre of the Leeds Playhouse (then the West Yorkshire Playhouse) in Leeds running from 29 November 2017 to 27 January 2018. Produced by Elliott Harper Productions, the play was directed by Sally Cookson and designed by Rae Smith. Other creatives include movement director Dan Canham, puppetry director Craig Leo, aerial director Gwen Hales, and fight directors Rachel Bown-Williams and Ruth Cooper-Brown. The production featured Michael Jean-Marain, Patricia Allison, John Leader, and Cora Kirk as the Pevensies; Aslan is played by Iain Johnstone and the White Witch by Carla Mendonça. Aslan was portrayed by both a human actor and a large canopy-like puppet head that would be carried above by ensemble members.

=== London (2019) ===
The show made its London debut from 9 November 2019 to 2 February 2020 at the Bridge Theatre. It is largely the same production that had premiered two years prior, with a majority of the creative team, including Cookson, reuniting in the rehearsal room. The cast featured Femi Akinfolarin, Shalisa James-Davis, John Leader, and Keziah Joseph as the Pevensie children; Wil Johnson as Aslan, and Laura Elphinstone as the White Witch.

=== UK and Ireland tour (2021) ===
A new major production of the show was announced in 2020. Directed by Michael Fentiman, the production is noted for employing the actor-muso approach, where the cast doubles as the orchestra. Though not a musical, the production adds a few songs and has a multi-disciplined cast of actors, singers, musicians, dancers, and puppeteers. Benji Bower's original score was expanded upon in development, with Fentiman bringing on Barnaby Race (with whom he had worked on Amélie) to the creative team. Other creatives include set and costume designer Tom Paris, choreographer Shanelle "Tali" Fergus, and illusion & magic consultant Chris Fisher.

The puppet designs for Aslan and Schrödinger are by Max Humphries. Puppet direction is by Toby Olié, who said that the Aslan puppet design is "made of terra cotta– like a piece of ancient pottery as if he was there before anyone else". Unlike its predecessor, the large puppet consists of an almost full body (minus its hind legs) that moves semi-realistically and requires 3 people to operate alongside its human counterpart: one inside the body, one for the tail, and one for the head. The production embarked on its tour beginning at Curve in Leicester and starred Samantha Womack as the White Witch; Ammar Duffus, Robyn Sinclair, Shaka Kalokoh, and Karise Yansen as the Pevensies; and Chris Jared as Aslan.

=== West End (2022) ===
After a successful UK tour, the show later transferred to the West End in 2022, beginning a limited run at the Gillian Lynne Theatre in London on 28 July, running into early 2023. A majority of the cast reprised their roles from the UK tour, including Womack, Duffus, Sinclair, Kalokoh, and Jared as the White Witch, the Pevensies, and Aslan respectively.

=== Birmingham (2023) ===
The production played at the Birmingham Repertory Theatre from 14 November 2023 to 28 January 2024. Casting was announced on 20 September.

=== Leeds and UK tour (2024-25) ===
The production returned to the Leeds Playhouse from 18 November 2024 to 25 January 2025 before embarking on another UK and Ireland tour.

== Principal Casts ==
Character	Leeds	London	UK tour	West End	Birmingham	Leeds / UK tour
Character	2017	2019	2021	2022	2023	2024
Peter Pevensie	Michael Jean-Marain	Femi Akinfolarin	Ammar Duffus	Ammar Duffus	Daniel Apea	Jesse Dunbar
Susan Pevensie	Patricia Allison	Shalisha James-Davis	Robyn Sinclair	Robyn Sinclair	Liyah Summers	Joanna Adaran
Edmund Pevensie	John Leader	John Leader	Shaka Kalokoh	Shaka Kalokoh	Jerome Scott	Bummi Osadolor
Lucy Pevensie	Cora Kirk	Keziah Joseph	Karise Yansen	Delainey Hayles	Kudzai Mangombe	Kudzai Mangombe
Aslan	Iain Johnstone	Wil Johnson	Chris Jared	Chris Jared	Oliver Hoare	Stanton Wright
The White Witch/Mrs. Macready	Carla Mendonça	Laura Elphinstone	Samantha Womack	Samantha Womack	Cath Whitefield	Katy Stephens
Mr. Tumnus	Peter Caulfield	Stuart Neal	Jez Unwin	Jez Unwin	Jez Unwin	Alfie Richards
Mr. Beaver	Alan Francis	Dean Nolan	Sam Buttery	Julian Hoult	Samuel Morgan-Grahame	Ed Thorpe
Mrs. Beaver	Lucy Tuck	Beverly Rudd	Christina Tedders	Christina Tedders	Ruby Ablett	Anya de Villiers
Professor Digory Kirke	Peter Caulfield	Wil Johnson	Johnson Willis	Johnson Willis	David Birrell	Kraig Thornber
Maugrim	Ira Mandela Siobhan	Omari Bernard	Michael Ahomka-Lindsay	Emmanuel Ogunjinmi	Shane Antony-Whitely	Shane Antony-Whitely

== Critical reception ==
The Leeds production received positive reviews. For WhatsOnStage, Matt Trueman wrote that "Cookson's staging...is strange, unsettling and scary, yet wondrous and magical all the same,...[instilling] a rich theatricality."

The Bridge production also received favorable reviews. For Time Out, Andrzej Lukowski wrote: "Cookson and designer Rae Smith delight in the novel's eccentricities rather than fight them: their Narnia is a DIY-inflected nirvana where a very funny sight gag about talking animals communicating via cans on strings can sit next to Elphinstone being genuinely terrifying, swelling to enormous height as cackling fiends gather around her."

The UK tour and West End production received generally positive reviews. According to Arifa Akbar of The Guardian, "Fentiman’s touring production fits this enormous West End stage like a glove. Tom Paris’s design is a wonder, with a giant clock face as a backdrop to mark the disparity between real-world time and Narnia’s parallel universe...Womack's White Witch is all hard edges and glaring looks yet resists becoming a pantomime villain." Humphries' puppet designs and Olié's direction received praise; for East Midlands Theatre, Phil Lowe wrote, "The puppetry aspects are a revelation and the all roaring, all majestic vision of the giant Aslan puppet and Chris Jared’s human personification are magnificent. The much smaller puppet for Schrödinger the cat belonging to Professor Kirk (Johnson Willis) is universally loved with [the] audience." Other reviews were more mixed, with Evening Standard in particular expressing disappointment over its pacing, the Aslan puppet, and one-dimensional performances.
