= 50 First Dates (musical) =

2025 musical

- The Musical
- Production artwork
- Music: David Rossmer; Steve Rosen
- Lyrics: David Rossmer; Steve Rosen
- Book: David Rossmer; Steve Rosen
- Basis: 50 First Dates by George Wing
- Premiere: 14 September 2025: The Other Palace, London
- Productions: 2025 London

50 First Dates: The Musical is a stage musical with music, book and lyrics by David Rossmer and Steve Rosen, based on the 2004 film of the same name with screenplay by George Wing.

== Production history ==
=== Original Off-West End production (2025) ===
On 12 March 2025, it was announced that the musical would have its world premiere Off West End at The Other Palace in London. The play would be directed and choreographed by Casey Nicholaw with a cast including Georgina Castle as Lucy and Josh St. Clair as Henry. Full casting was announced on 30 June 2025.

The Off-West End production ran from 14 September until 16 November 2025 and received mixed-to-positive reviews, with reviewers praising the performances of Castle and St. Clair, but criticizing the lack of emotional depth in the songs and story.

== Cast and characters ==
Character	Off-West End
Character	2025
Lucy Whitmore	Georgina Castle
Henry	Josh St. Clair
Sharon	Georgia Arron
Miles	Aizaac Aruna
Miriam	Zoë Ann Bown
Fran	Emily Olive Boyd
Ensemble	Greg Stylianou Burns
Swing	Cole Dunn
Swing	Samuelle Durojaiye
Swing	Paul Kemble
Marlin Whitmore	John Marquez
Delilah	Natasha O’Brien
Ukulele Sue	Aiesha Naomi Pease
Sid	David Pendlebury
Cora	Martha Pothen
Marco	Ricky Rojas
Sandy	Chad Saint Louis
Swing	Samantha Thomas
Doug Whitmore	Charlie Toland
