= Mr Gum and the Dancing Bear - the Musical! =

Mr Gum and the Dancing Bear
- The Musical!
- Music: Jim Fortune
- Lyrics: Andy Stanton
- Book: Andy Stanton
- Basis: Mr Gum and the Dancing Bear by Andy Stanton
- Premiere: 31 July 2019: National Theatre, London
- Productions: 2019 London

Mr Gum and the Dancing Bear - the Musical! is a children's musical with book and lyrics by Andy Stanton and music by Jim Fortune, based on Stanton's children's book of the same name (as part of the Mr Gum series).

== Production ==
=== National Theatre world premiere (2019) ===
The musical premiered in the Dorfman Theatre at the National Theatre, London, beginning previews from 25 July with a press night on 31 July, running until 31 August 2019. The production was directed by Amy Hodge with set and costume designs by Georgia Lowe, musical direction by Tarek Merchant, lighting design by Lee Curran, choreography by Fleur Darkin, sound design by Carolyn Downing and puppetry by Jimmy Grimes. The musical is recommended for ages 7+ and runs for 2 hours (including an interval).

The production received a nomination for Best Family Show at the 2020 Laurence Olivier Awards.

== Cast and characters ==
Character	London (2019)
Mr Gum	Steve Furst
Billy / Captain Brazil	Helena Lymbert
Jonathan Ripples	Gary Wilmot
Alan Taylor / Friday O'Leary	Richard Cant
Polly	Keziah Joseph
Padlock / Old Granny / Dance Captain	Kate Malyon
Swing	Tom Giles

== Critical reception ==
The musical has received five star reviews from The Stage and The Times and four star reviews from Time Out, and The Sunday Times.

== Awards and nominations ==
Year	Award	Category	Result
2020	Laurence Olivier Awards	Best Family Show	Nominated
