= Steve Furst =

British comedian and actor (born 1967)

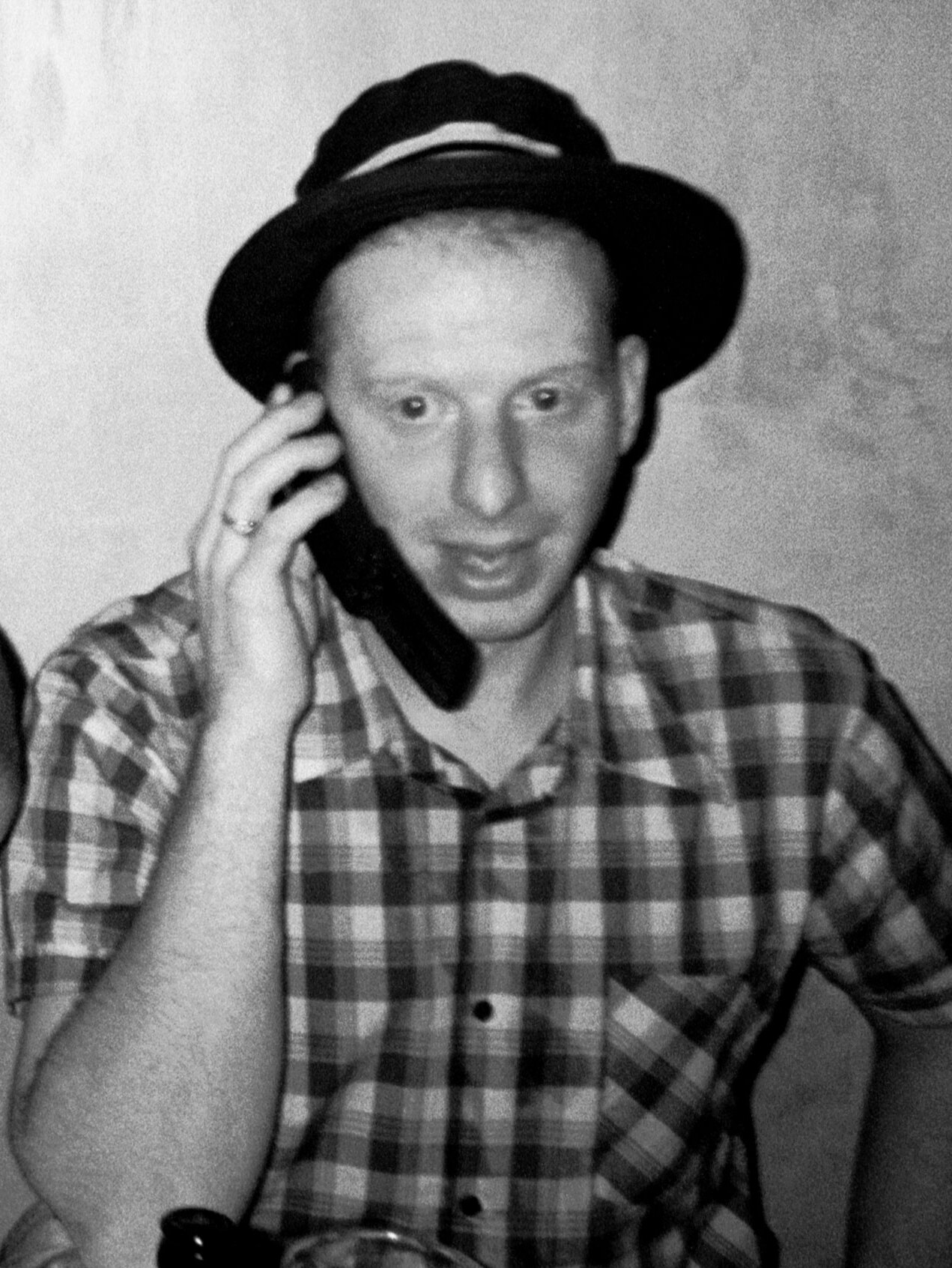
- Furst in 2000
- Born: Stephen Jonathan Furst; 3 September 1967 (age 59); Belfast, Northern Ireland
- Occupations: Comedian, actor, writer
- Years active: 1990–present

Steven Jonathan Furst (born 3 September 1967) is a Northern Irish comedian, actor and writer. He has appeared regularly on television, including the BBC comedy series Little Britain, does voice-over work, and appeared in the Orange mobile phone cinema adverts in the UK (with Brennan Brown), playing a spoof studio executive. Furst also performs as cabaret character Lenny Beige.

== Comedy career ==
Furst first worked in comedy writing for Chris Evans's Power Up show on BSB's Power Station music channel in 1990. He then set up Britain's first comedy magazine, The Heckler. In 1992, he worked as a stand-up comedian and promoter, founding comedy nights such as The Double Six Club, The Youth Club, and The Regency Rooms.

=== Lenny Beige ===
Furst also works under the name Lenny Beige, promoted comedy nights (started on the Regency Rooms) and fought the 1997 general election in Putney under that name, and had 2 series on BBC Choice with guests including Terry Wogan, Davina McCall, Claudia Winkleman, Chas & Dave, Tony Hadley and many more.

Furst often performed (as Lenny Beige) at the Regency Rooms in London's West End which ran for a total of 10 seasons. Guy Chambers was Lenny's musical director when he also became co-writer and producer of Robbie Williams who himself made many appearances at the club. Beige also regularly appeared at Club Montepulciano; the band Hooverphonic sing about this in their song of the same name ("Lenny Beige is performing spinning wheel/Club Montepulciano is what you need"). After the Regency Rooms was closed in 2000, Lenny was retired. In 2006 he returned to host a series of cabaret nights at The Pigalle Club in Picadilly. His tribute show to Anthony Newley was premiered at The Pigalle Club and received 5 star reviews.

In 2012, Lenny was asked to host a residency at Mayfair's Playboy Casino, which he did for over 12 months. Lenny Beige Sings Neil Diamond is Lenny's newest show, which first premiered at Cafe Zédel. He has now added another tribute show, Beige Waits For All a tribute to the legendary American singer songwriter Tom Waits.

== Other work ==
Since 2012, Furst has also held a role on the judging panel for the Norwich Film Festival. He has hosted a regular show on Soho Radio as himself, Lenny Beige and also The Mayor of Kentish Town. Furst has also worked alongside composer Guy Chambers writing lyrics for artists, most recently the Irish singer/songwrter Nathan Carter. With Chambers he also co-wrote songs for the movies A Christmas Number One and also for The Night Before Christmas in Wonderland.

He continues to write his own songs which he often performs live. In late 2025, it was announced that he would launch the Circle and Star Theatre in the space previously occupied by Pentameters Theatre at The Horseshoe pub in Hampstead.

Also in 2025, Furst appeared in a television advert for Heinz baked beans.

== Appearances ==
Furst made his professional television debut as a stand up in LWT's After Midnight. He has appeared on The Johnny Vaughan Tonight show on BBC Choice and BBC One, He was a regular weekly contributor on The Late Edition with Marcus Brigstocke and as the host on the British Hit Singles & Albums No.1 Music Quiz DVD. He has also appeared as Manitol in 3 series of CBBC sitcom called The Legend of Dick and Dom in which he starred alongside Dominic Wood, Richard McCourt and Chloe Bale. He is in 'Combat Kids', another CBBC show and The Dumping Ground. In 2018 he starred in the new CITV show Spy Kids as the villain Goldfist.

Furst has also appeared in the Catterick series with Vic Reeves and Bob Mortimer as an assistant Police Officer Sergeant Mingemungington. He has appeared in nearly 30 commercials in the cinema for Orange as the sidekick of the main male character played by Brennan Brown. He has also appeared in numerous other programmes; Bodies, Born and Bred, all three series of Little Britain, The Bill, Dick and Dom's Funny Business, Father Brown, Doc Martin, Friday Night Dinner and Tracey Breaks the News. He appears as DI Gary Cunningham in ITV's three part drama Manhunt.

He appeared occasionally as a contributor to The Wright Stuff on Five. In 2018 he took a starring role as Popsy Wilson Jr in the 20th Century Fox movie Walk Like a Panther.

== Theatre ==
In 2003, Furst appeared as Juror No.1 in 12 Angry Men at the Assembly Rooms at the Edinburgh Fringe.

In 2009/10, Furst starred alongside Michael Brandon in Oliver Cotton's play Wet Weather Cover at the King's Head Theatre before transferring to London's West End. He played Hymie in the 2011 production of Chicken Soup With Barley by Arnold Wesker at the Royal Court Theatre, directed by artistic director Dominic Cook.

On 27 March 2012, it was announced Furst would play the role of Mr Wormwood in Matilda the Musical, which had been playing the Cambridge Theatre in London's West End since October 2011. He replaced Paul Kaye beginning performances 17 April 2012.

Furst was scheduled to be part of the world premiere cast of Made in Dagenham from October 2014, at the Adelphi Theatre in the West End.

In 2019, he starred in the titular role of Mr Gum, in Mr Gum & The Dancing Bear at the National Theatre.

In the autumn of 2022, he appeared at the Royal Court Theatre in the production of Jews In Their Own Words. In 2023, he starred as Fagin in a Leeds Playhouse production of Oliver! In August 2024, he played Shylock in a West End concert of Something Rotten! at Theatre Royal, Drury Lane. Over Christmas 2024, he performed as Alfred P Doolittle in My Fair Lady at the Curve Theatre, Leicester.

== Personal life ==
On 14 October 2019, Furst was conferred an Honorary Fellowship of the University of Winchester.

== Publications ==
- Radio Comedy 1938–68: A Guide to 30 Years of Wonderful Wireless, Virgin Books, 1996
