= Simon Godwin =

American artistic director

Simon Godwin is artistic director of the Shakespeare Theatre Company in Washington, D.C. He was previously associate director of London's National Theatre, associate director of the Royal Court Theatre, and associate director at Bristol Old Vic.

== Early life and education ==
Godwin was educated at Anna Scher Theatre School, an independent stage school in Islington in north London. Whilst at school, he appeared in the 1991 BBC adaptation of Five Children and It.

He attended the St Catharine's College, Cambridge at the University of Cambridge, where he studied English. He had a cameo role in The Killings at Badgers Drift, the very first episode of Midsummer Murders, playing a student actor.

In 2005, he began a two-year post graduate program at the London International School of Performing Arts (LISPA), where he studied physical theatre and devising.

== Career ==
Simon began directing at Cambridge, and after graduating he began producing classical work including Romeo and Juliet for the Cambridge Arts Theatre and the Marlowe Society. Godwin was then assistant director to Dominic Dromgoole and Tim Supple. He then founded Stray Dogs Theatre Company producing Inkle and Yarico, as well as Eurydice at the BAC before it transferred to the Whitehall Theatre in the West End, which made it one of the youngest companies ever to have work staged in London's West End. This was followed by All's Well That Ends Well for a national tour.

In 2001 Simon became associate director at the Royal and Derngate Theatres in Northampton where he worked as the deputy to the artistic director, Rupert Goold and directed seven main stage shows, including The Seagull, Habeas Corpus, Relatively Speaking and with Salisbury Playhouse, and Quartermaine's Terms by Simon Gray.

In 2008 he joined Tom Morris, as the associate director of The Bristol Old Vic, where he directed The Little Mermaid, Krapp's Last Tape/A Kind of Alaska, Faith Healer and Far Away.

At the Tabard Theatre his production of The Country by Martin Crimp was well received, and in 2008 he became part of the Royal Court International Residency. At the Almeida Theatre in 2009 he directed All The Little Things We Crushed by Joel Horwood, followed by a critically acclaimed national tour of The Winter's Tale for Schtanhaus and Nuffield Theatre Southampton, in association with Headlong.

In 2009 Simon became associate director of the Royal Court. While there Simon directed seven world premieres, including Routes, If You Don't Let Us Dream, We Won't Let You Sleep, NSFW, The Witness, Goodbye to All That, The Acid Test, and Wanderlust, for which he was longlisted for Evening Standard Awards Best Newcomer in 2010.

Godwin subsequently joined Bristol Old Vic as associate director, directing productions of Far Away (Caryl Churchill) and Faith Healer (Brian Friel). The latter was subsequently remounted in 2012 as part of the Hong Kong Arts Festival.

In 2012 Simon was awarded the inaugural Evening Standard/Burberry Award for an Emerging Director.

In 2013 Simon made his debut at the National Theatre with Strange Interlude with Anne Marie Duff followed by Man and Superman with Ralph Fiennes. When Rufus Norris became the new artistic director of the National Theatre in 2015, he invited Simon to become part of his team of permanent Associates.

Simon has also enjoyed a long-standing relationship with the Royal Shakespeare Company. In 2014 he directed The Two Gentlemen of Verona followed in 2016 by an acclaimed Hamlet, which toured to The Kennedy Center in Washington D.C. His Timon of Athens, starring Kathryn Hunter as Timon opened at the Royal Shakespeare Company in December 2018.

His production of Antony and Cleopatra with Ralph Fiennes and Sophie Okonedo opened at the National Theatre, London in September 2018. In May 2019, Simon made his Tokyo debut, directing a Japanese cast in Hamlet for Theatre Cocoon.

In September 2018, Simon was appointed artistic director of the Shakespeare Theatre Company Washington D.C. effective 1 August 2019. He made his directorial debut with the company in February 2020 with a remounted production of Timon of Athens with Kathryn Hunter reprising her role.

In August 2019, he directed Hansard in the Lyttelton Theatre at the National Theatre. Hansard was the debut play by writer Simon Woods and was broadcast in October 2019 by National Theatre Live.

In August 2020, he directed Romeo and Juliet at the National Theatre, with Josh O'Connor and Jessie Buckley playing the title roles. The performance was adapted for filming in 2021—the National Theatre's first such venture.

In July 2022, his production for the National Theatre of 'Much Ado About Nothing' opened in the Lyttelton Theatre starring Katherine Parkinson and John Heffernan.

== Work ==
Godwin's directing career includes:

Year	Title	Production
2024	The Comedy of Errors	Shakespeare Theatre Company
2024	Macbeth	Shakespeare Theatre Company
2023	King Lear	Shakespeare Theatre Company
2022	Much Ado About Nothing	Shakespeare Theatre Company
2022	Much Ado About Nothing	Royal National Theatre
2020	Romeo and Juliet	Royal National Theatre
2020	Timon of Athens	Theatre for a New Audience Shakespeare Theatre Company
2019	Hansard	National Theatre
2019	Hamlet	Theatre Cocoon
2018	Timon of Athens	Royal Shakespeare Company
2018	Antony & Cleopatra	National Theatre
2017	Rules for Living	Royal & Derngate Theatre
2017	Twelfth Night	National Theatre
2016	Hamlet	Royal Shakespeare Company (2016) and The Kennedy Center (2018)
2016	The Cherry Orchard	Roundabout Theatre Company
2015	Richard II	Shakespeare's Globe
2015	The Beaux' Stratagem	National Theatre
2015	Man and Superman	National Theatre
2014	The Two Gentlemen of Verona	Royal Shakespeare Theatre
2013	If You Don't Let Us Dream, We Won't Let You Sleep	Royal Court Theatre
2013	The Little Mermaid	Bristol Old Vic
2013	Routes	Royal Court Theatre
2013	Strange Interlude	National Theatre
2012	NSFW	Royal Court Theatre
2012	The Witness	Royal Court Theatre
2012	A Kind of Alaska & Krapp's Last Tape by Harold Pinter & Samuel Beckett	Bristol Old Vic
2012	Goodbye To All That by Luke Norris	Royal Court Theatre
2011	The Acid Test by Anya Reiss	Royal Court Theatre
2011	Faith Healer by Brian Friel	Bristol Old Vic and Hong Kong Arts Festival (2012)
2010	Wanderlust by Nick Payne	Royal Court Theatre
2010	Far Away by Caryl Churchill	Bristol Old Vic
2009	The Winter's Tale by William Shakespeare	National Tour
2009	All The Little Things We Crushed by Joel Horwood	Almeida Theatre
2008	The Country by Martin Crimp	Tabard Theatre
2004	Relatively Speaking by Alan Ayckbourne	Royal & Derngate Theatre
2001	Romeo & Juliet by William Shakespeare	Cambridge Arts Theatre
1999	Eurydice by Jean Anouilh	Battersea Arts Centre and Whitehall Theatre
1998	Inkle and Yarico by George Coleman	Battersea Arts Centre
1991	Five Children and It by Marilyn Fox	
