= Amélie (musical) =

Musical based on the 2001 film Amélie

Amélie: The Musical
- UK promotional logo
- Music: Daniel Messé
- Lyrics: Daniel Messé; Nathan Tysen
- Book: Craig Lucas
- Basis: 2001 film Amélie
- Premiere: September 11, 2015: Berkeley Repertory Theatre
- Productions: 2015 Berkeley; 2016 Los Angeles; 2017 Broadway; 2019 UK tour 2021 West End

Amélie is a musical based on the 2001 romantic comedy film of the same name with music by Daniel Messé, lyrics by Messé and Nathan Tysen and a book by Craig Lucas. The musical premiered at Berkeley Repertory Theatre in September 2015. The musical began previews on Broadway on March 9, 2017 at the Walter Kerr Theatre, before opening April 3, 2017. It closed after 83 performances on May 21, 2017.

A substantially transformed production, with new orchestrations, an expanded repertoire of songs, and new staging in the actor/muso style, opened on the West End in December 2019, at the Other Palace. Critics praised its improvements on the Broadway version, with The Guardian describing it as "a triumph of adaptation" "high on imagination", while The Daily Telegraph lauded the "wonderful, wistful evening" it made. It was nominated for three awards at the 2020 Laurence Olivier Awards: Best New Musical, Best Original Score or New Orchestrations, and Best Actress in a Musical (for Audrey Brisson as Amélie).

== Productions ==
Daniel Messé (of Hem) wrote the lyrics with Nathan Tysen, Craig Lucas wrote the book, and Messé wrote the music in the adaptation of the movie for the stage.

=== Berkeley Repertory Theatre (2015) ===
Amélie had its premiere at Berkeley Repertory Theatre. The musical was directed by Pam MacKinnon and starred Samantha Barks in the titular role of Amélie, with scenic and costume design by David Zinn, lighting design by Jane Cox and Mark Barton and projections by Peter Nigrini.

=== Los Angeles (2016) ===
The musical opened at the Ahmanson Theatre in Los Angeles in a pre-Broadway engagement, running from December 4, 2016 to January 15, 2017 with Phillipa Soo taking over the role of Amélie. The cast for the Los Angeles and Broadway productions includes Adam Chanler-Berat, Manoel Felciano, and Tony Sheldon.

=== Broadway (2017) ===
The musical opened on Broadway at the Walter Kerr Theatre on March 9, 2017, in previews, officially on April 3. Direction is by Pam MacKinnon with musical staging and choreography by Sam Pinkleton. Puppet design is by Amanda Villalobos. The show closed on May 21, 2017, after 27 previews and 56 regular performances.

=== Japan (2018) ===
The musical opened at The Galaxy Theater in Tokyo, Japan for a limited engagement on May 18 to June 3, 2018. The musical then opened for a limited engagement at Morinomiya Piloti Hall, Osaka, on June 7 to June 10. Direction was by Akiko Kodama with choreography by Kuroda Eriko and Nishikawa Taku. The production used a new staging by Yagi Emiko and was translated into Japanese by Shigai Tsu. The cast for the Japanese production included Watanabe Mayu as Amélie and Atsuhi Ota as Nino.

=== Germany (2019) ===
The musical, under the title "Die fabelhafte Welt der Amélie" (The Fabulous World of Amélie) had its European premiere in Germany in February 2019 at the Werk7 Theater in Munich produced by Uschi Neuss and Joop Van Den Ende. On the 13th of November 2018 It was announced that Sandra Leitner would star as Amélie in the German production.

=== UK (2019–2021) ===
The musical premiered in the United Kingdom at the Watermill Theatre in Newbury, where it ran from 11 April to 18 May 2019, before embarking on a UK tour. Directed by Michael Fentiman, the production is noted for using the actor-muso approach, where the actors themselves provides the musical accompaniment. Fentiman and his creative team worked with original collaborators Messé, Tysen, and Lucas to amend the show, making changes such as splitting it into two acts separated by an intermission, the reinstitution of songs from out-of-town tryouts, and the reshuffling of scenes. The final book is what is now licensed through Concord Theatricals. The original Watermill cast included Audrey Brisson as Amélie and Chris Jared as Nino. Danny Mac later joined the cast as Nino. The production made its London debut at The Other Palace during the Christmas season, from 29 November 2019 until 1 February 2020. The entire UK tour cast (with the exception of Mac, who was replaced by Jared) reprised their respective roles in the London run. The show was favourably reviewed.

The show was nominated for 3 Laurence Olivier Awards, including Best New Musical and Best Actress in a Musical for Brisson, in the 2020 ceremony. The show's album was also nominated for Best Musical Theater Album in the 63rd Annual Grammy Awards in 2021.

The production transferred to the West End for a limited run at the Criterion Theatre, with its first performance on the 20th May 2021. The majority of the original London cast reprised their respective roles, including Brisson and Jared as Amélie and Nino respectively.

=== Finland (2019) ===
The musical will have its premiere in Finland in Turku City Theatre on 13 September 2019. Director and choreographer of the show is Reija Wäre, musical staging is by Jussi Vahvaselkä. Amelie is played by Marketta Tikkanen, and Nino by Mikael Saari.

=== Australia (2020) ===
The musical was scheduled to have its Australian premiere at Darlinghurst Theatre in Sydney, New South Wales. It was originally to preview from the 2nd of July and open on the 10th. The production was postponed due to the Impact of the COVID-19 pandemic on the performing arts and, to date, has not been revived. The director of the show was originally slated to be Shaun Rennie. This production was to have the same actor-musician casting approach as the 2019 UK production.

=== The Netherlands (2021–2022) ===
It was announced that a Dutch-language version of the musical will be performed as a national tour in the Netherlands in 2021 and 2022. This version of the musical will be produced by Morssinkhof Terra Theatrical and feature Dutch actress Christanne de Bruijn as Amélie.

=== New Zealand (2025) ===
In 2025 the Austrilasian premiere of Amelie premiered at the Hannah Playhouse in November. It was put on by WITCH Music Theatre. The cast featured Rachel McSweeney as Amelie Poulain, Henry Ashby as Nino Quincampoix and Craig Beadsworth as Raphael Poulain.

=== Italy (2026–2027) ===
An Italian-language production of Amélie was announced for the 2026–2027 theatrical season, starring Giulia Ottonello as Amélie Poulain. The production is directed and choreographed by Eugenio Contenti, with musical direction by Fabio Serri and an Italian translation of the book and lyrics by Alessio Fusi.

The production features scenic design by Gabriele Moreschi, costumes by Rosanna Monti, lighting design by Emanuele Agliati and sound design by Jacopo Pesci. It is produced by Ad Astra Entertainment in collaboration with Compagnia delle Formiche and Fabrizio di Fiore Entertainment & FDF GAT, under license from Concord Theatricals.

The production, performed entirely in Italian, is scheduled to tour Italy during the 2026–2027 season. Its Milan engagement is scheduled at the Teatro Nazionale from 29 to 31 January 2027.

== Plot ==
NOTE: The Broadway synopsis is based on its first preview. Changes to the plot were implemented in 2019 with the development of the UK production; the revisions are now what is licensed via Concord Theatricals and are therefore described here.

=== Broadway production (2017) ===
The musical opens with an introduction of young Amélie and her family ("Times Are Hard For Dreamers (Prologue)"). Young Amélie is born to germaphobe father, Raphael, and to neurotic mother, Amandine, and she feels isolated and emotionally distant from her parents. She takes solace in her telescope, which she uses to view the universe from afar. Her only contact with her parents comes in the form of a monthly health check-up from her father. One day, Amélie gets so excited to see him that her heart races and Raphael misdiagnoses her with a heart condition ("World's Best Dad").

Her parents, paranoid, begin to homeschool Amélie and cut off all of her contact with the outside world. In a lesson with Amandine one day, Amélie imagines her goldfish, Fluffy, coming alive and speaking to her ("World's Best Friend"). When Amélie allows Fluffy to jump into her drinking glass, her parents panic and force Amélie to release Fluffy into the Seine, leaving her alone. Feeling bad, Amandine takes Amélie to Notre Dame to make up for what happened, and Amandine prays for guidance on how to deal with Amélie and hopes for a son ("World's Best Mom"). When they leave the cathedral, Amandine is crushed and killed by a suicidal tourist who leapt from the top of it. The death hits Raphael hard, and he builds a shrine in their home to Amandine, complete with a garden gnome.

Years pass, and Amélie becomes bored with her quiet life and distant father, and she decides to leave home. Five years later, she is a waitress at a café in Montmartre ("Times Are Hard for Dreamers"). She has a quiet, happy life, and spends her time with her three co-workers: Suzanne, the café's owner and a past circus performer, Georgette, a hypochondriac, and Gina. Some of Amélie's regular customers include Gina's ex-boyfriend Joseph, Hipolito, a poet, and Philomene, an air hostess. ("The Commute")

On the night of Princess Diana's death, Amélie discovers a box of childhood treasures belonging to the man who used to own her apartment ("The Bottle Drops"). She is determined to find the owner and anonymously deliver the box to him, and if the owner is touched by her gesture, she resolves that she will become an anonymous do-gooder. She first meets with a cranky grocer, Colignon, who constantly abuses his assistant, Lucien, a mentally-ill young man that has an obsession with fruit ("Three Figs"). Colignon tells Amélie to confer with his mother on the other side of town.

At the train station, Amélie spots a man her age, Nino, who she is attracted to. However, the train arrives before she can introduce herself to him. At Colignon's mother's home, Amélie learns the surname of the box's owner: Bredoteau. When Amélie returns home Nino spots her on the street, noticing how pretty she is and finds himself intrigued with the box.

Time passes, and Amélie's search for Bredoteau isn't working out. One day, she speaks to her neighbor, Julien Dufayel—an artist who suffers from a brittle bone disease, giving him the nickname 'The Glass Man'—and, possibly recognizing the box, tells her that Bredoteau is the incorrect name. The man was really called Bretodeau. Dufayel then shows Amélie his recreation of the painting The Luncheon of the Boating Party, remarking on Amélie's isolation ("The Girl with the Glass").

Amélie discovers Bretodeau in the phonebook and calls him from a payphone, telling him where he can pick up the box ("How To Tell Time"). When Bretodeau finds it, he reflects on his childhood and decides to call his ex-wife and arrange to meet their son. Taking it as a sign, Amélie continues her good-doing, taking a blind beggar on a tour of the streets of Paris, describing his surroundings in detail. ("Tour de France").

Later that night, Amélie has a strange dream where she imagines her lavish funeral in the style of Princess Diana's, where she is serenaded by Elton John and dubbed 'Godmother of the Unloved' – someone who gives herself to help others despite not being able to find her own love ("Goodbye Amélie"). Amélie suddenly realizes she hasn't helped her father and visits him the next day and tries to convince him to leave home ("Backyard"). He refuses, saying he can't leave the garden gnome, so Amélie secretly steals it as she leaves. On her way home, she spots Nino again at the train station, where he drops a photo album on the ground that Amélie takes.

Amélie explores the album with Dufayel, and finds it is full of photo-booth photographs, one of which is a picture of a man who appears over and over again, expressionless. Nino appears and explains the meaning of the photos to the company ("When the Booth Goes Bright"). Amélie watches him from the distance, and Dufayel, seeing her attraction to him, encourages her to give the album back and meet Nino.

Amélie seeks out his place of work, a sex shop, and goes dressed as a nun. While she waits for Nino, the other employees mock him, unknowingly painting him as a perfect match for Amélie. However, when he arrives, Amélie runs away ("Sister's Pickle"). He chases her but she escapes and reflects on her childhood, remembering how her mother told her never to get too close to anyone ("Halfway"). Amélie then calls Nino, but refuses to give him her identity, instead sending him a photo of her in another disguise and a riddle to solve.

At the café, Amélie secretly instigates a romantic encounter between Joseph and Georgette. She also writes a letter in the voice of Gina's ex-husband, telling Gina that he greatly regrets eloping with his secretary; this final letter gives her the closure she needed to move on from mourning ("Window Seat"). Her father then turns up, telling Amélie about the missing gnome and how he has been getting anonymous postcards detailing the gnome's travels ("There's No Place Like Gnome"). The travels encouraged Raphael to step out of the house to look for him, and Amélie uses the opportunity to get him to relax and embrace the change, while introducing him to Suzanne, who he falls for.

Meanwhile, Nino has been searching Paris for Amélie, and handing out posters with her photo on them to anyone he sees, wondering how he's fallen for someone who doesn't want to be found ("Thin Air"). While doing another of her good deeds—spray painting a quote from one of Hipolito's poems on walls around Paris—Amélie notices the flyers and runs home, sending Nino another photo and instructions to meet her at the Montmartre Carousel.

Amélie constructs an elaborate trail to lead Nino to the album ("Blue Arrow Suite") and watches him follow it. When he finds the album, she calls out to him, asking about the man in the photo-booth. However, Nino is more interested in seeing her face, and she agrees to meet him at the café on Tuesday.

Tuesday arrives and Nino is late for the meeting, prompting Amélie to imagine an elaborate story to his reasoning ("The Late Nino Quincampoix"). Meanwhile, Georgette is overwhelmed by Joseph's clingy nature. Nino shows up, but when he recognizes Amélie, she finds herself nervous and runs from him. Hurt and tired, Nino leaves, but the girls in the café go after him just as Amélie reconsiders and returns. Asking of Nino's whereabouts, Joseph lies and says he went off with Gina. Heartbroken, Amélie returns home.

Outside the café, Gina, Georgette and Suzanne demand to know Nino's intentions with Amélie ("A Better Haircut"). Nino says he is honestly in love with her, and needs to know how she feels for him. Touched, Georgette gives him Amélie's address.

At home, Dufayel tries to talk to Amélie, but she angrily tells him to stay out of her business, not stopping to hear that he has finally gotten out of his rut and painted a unique picture: a portrait of her. As she goes inside, Nino shows up outside her door and begs a conflicted Amélie to let him inside and stop running from him ("Stay"). She is convinced to let Nino inside when Dufayel, through the apartment's window, shows Amélie his painting and insists that she'll regret not trying a relationship with Nino.

She opens the door and tells Nino she wants to be with him. He tells her he loves her, even if she cannot love him back ("Halfway (Reprise)"). They kiss and Amélie takes him to the photo booth, where she shows him the answer to the mystery of the man in the album: he's the repairman who takes a photo after fixing the booth, to check if it works properly. They go into the photo booth, taking pictures together, and reflecting on their newfound happiness and wondering what will happen next ("Where Do We Go From Here?").

=== UK production (2019–2021) ===
==== Act I ====
The story of Amélie is narrated by all of the people in her life. They tell us how every moment of our lives and everyone we meet are connected in ways we may not know or understand ("The Flight Of The Blue Fly"). Born to two neurotic and self-centered parents— Raphael and Amandine—young Amélie doesn't learn how to love. One day during her monthly medical exam, her heart beats wildly and Raphael misdiagnoses her with a heart defect, leading the parents to homeschool her away from the outside world ("World's Best Papa"). They give her a goldfish, Fluffy, to keep as a friend. One day during a geometry lesson, Amélie gets distracted by Fluffy, causing Amandine to scold her ("World's Best Friend"). Amandine's irritating neuroticism causes Fluffy to become suicidal, leading him to jump out of his bowl; when chaos ensues as Raphael and Amandine attempt to get the fish back in its bowl, they decide that it has to go, and Amélie is forced to release him into a nearby canal.

Later on, Amandine and Amélie go to Notre Dame Cathedral, where they pray for a baby brother ("World's Best Mama"). On their way out, a Canadian tourist hurls himself off a parapet in the cathedral, killing Amandine when he lands on her. A funeral is held shortly after, and Raphael makes a shrine for his wife's ashes, including a garden gnome that reminds him of her ("Post Mortem"). When she turns seventeen, young Amélie leaves home.

Five years after that, Amélie is a waitress at the Two Windmills Café in Montmartre ("The Sound of Going Round in Circles"). The staff and customers are all caught in a routine of dissatisfaction: Hipolito, an unpublished novelist; Georgette, a lonely tobacconist who suffers from hypochondria; Gina, a waitress who obsessively rereads love letters from her late husband who abandoned her for his secretary (the two flying off to South America only to be killed in a plane crash); Joseph, a plumber who is stalking Gina after one failed date a year earlier; Philomene, an airline stewardess who leaves her cat with Amélie while she's away; and Suzanne, the proprietress who previously worked as a trapeze artist until her partner dropped her, causing a career-ending injury. Amélie observes them all without ever making a deep connection or revealing anything about herself.

Every night Amélie goes home alone, following the same routine ("The Commute Home"), spying on her neighbors with a small telescope and watching TV. At the same time, another Parisian loner, Nino Quincampoix, goes from metro station to metro station collecting the torn halves of photographs discarded at photobooths. He sings of the forgotten stories in the snapshots, implying a similar proclivity for observation ("When The Booth Goes Bright"). Alone in her apartment, Amélie sees the news of Lady Diana's death in a car crash in Paris. She drops her perfume bottle, which dislodges a tile at the edge of the room, revealing a small metal box filled with a child's treasures ("The Bottle Drops"). Amélie vows to find the owner of the box and return it. If he is grateful, she will devote her life to being a do-gooder; if not, so be it.

Amélie visits the local grocer, Collignon, whose innocent and simple-minded assistant Lucien sings to the produce ("Three Figs"). Somehow, Amélie has gotten the idea that the box might belong to Collignon, who lived in the apartment before her, but it is not his. He suggests that Amélie visit his parents who might remember who lived in the apartment before they did. At a metro station, Amélie and Nino bump into each other and briefly interact as Nino retrieves a photostrip from the bottom of her shoe, puzzling her; their hearts beat loudly for each other, but Amélie is late for her train. Collignon's parents tell Amélie that the person who lived in the apartment before them was named Dominique Bredoteau. Returning home, Amélie meets Nino once more at a different metro station and he takes note of the mysterious box she holds, but runs off in pursuit of someone he thinks he recognizes. Travelling from one end of Paris to another in pursuit of Dominique Bredoteau, Amélie has no luck.

On the second-floor landing to her apartment, she meets a neighbor, Julien Dufayel, who suffers from a rare bone disease causing him to avoid contact for fear of breaking a bone. He invites her into his apartment, where he spends all of his time painting copies of Renoir's "Luncheon of the Boating Party". He is never able to capture the expression on the face of one of the figures, a lonely woman ("The Girl With The Glass") whose situation Amélie projects herself onto. Dufayel corrects Amélie's incorrect information; the former tenant is actually named Bretodeau, not Bredoteau. Dominique Bretodeau is on his way home when a payphone rings. He answers and Amélie, disguising her voice from the nearby Two Windmills Café, instructs him to look down. He does, seeing his own childhood treasure and feeling a flood of memories ("How To Tell Time"). He stumbles into the café and tries to tell the denizens about his miracle; on an impulse, he calls his ex-wife and begs for a chance to see her and their son again. She agrees. Before leaving, Bretodeau kisses Amélie on the head in a rush of elation and thanks everyone for his good fortune.

Amélie has found her mission. She leaves work early and looks for someone else to help. She grabs a dyspeptic blind beggar and takes him on a tour of Montmarte, describing his surroundings to him ("Tour de France"). Elated by her success, Amélie returns home to watch the funeral of Princess Diana on TV, imagining herself as a world-famous do-gooder who also dies too young. Inside Westminster Abbey, Elton John sings a song in praise of the newly martyred Amélie ("Goodbye, Amélie").

==== Act II ====
Amélie and Nino are sitting on a train; they sing of their love for each other, but do not know the other one is but a few feet away ("Half Asleep"). At a stop, Nino stands up to leave; Amélie spots him and hides. Amélie visits her father; his shrine to Amandine has grown in size, obsessively tended to. She tries to get Raphael to go on a trip like he's always wanted to or visit her but he dismisses the idea, saying that he's better off in his backyard taking care of the gnome ("Backyard").

When he leaves, she steals the gnome and gives it to Philomene at a metro station where Amélie once again sees Nino. Late for his train, he leaves behind a photo album; she finds it and takes it to Dufayel. The two peruse the pages—so many faces of people who tore their photos in two, the halves now joined again in this album. The two take notice of one face that appears repeatedly, taken in every photobooth in Paris, and wonder who it could be. In the back of the book is a name and address: Nino Quincampoix. Dufayel picks up on the idea that Amélie may have feelings for the owner of the album and tells her to return the album and befriend him, or else she's better off joining a convent. Amélie gets an idea.

Disguised as a nun, Amélie visits the sex shop where Nino works. While a coworker goes to find him in another room, Amélie tries to sort out what she wants from this stranger ("Sister's Pickle"). At the last minute, she flees, terrified to connect with this man who intrigues her; she keeps the album. Based on how his coworker describes her, Nino realizes that the woman with his album is the same woman from the metro that he is in love with. Dufayel asks Amélie why she didn't speak to Nino; dismissing him, she thinks back to a geometry lesson her mother taught her as a child, a metaphor for how true connection with others is impossible ("Halfway"). She is determined to find some way to break out of her isolation. She sends a letter to Nino with a photograph of herself dressed as Zorro and a cryptic message.

Focusing back on her anonymous good deeds, she then composes a letter to Gina in the voice of Gina's deceased husband and posts it with a cover letter from the postal service, claiming to have unearthed the letter from a crash in the Andes. In it, Gina's ex-husband declares his undying love and confesses to having made a mistake running away with his secretary ("Window Seat"). With this letter, Gina gains closure and is finally able to move on. Through Amélie, Georgette and Joseph find themselves alone in the loo and begin to fall in love. At the same time, Nino is plastering Paris with leaflets of Amélie's face in the Zorro mask with the header "Have you seen this woman?". Knowing exactly the game she's playing, he wonders out loud how he's falling for someone who doesn't want to be found ("Thin Air").

Raphael shows up at the café with a series of postcards he has received from around the globe—written by the gnome ("There's No Place Like Gnome"). Amélie assures him of his worries and tells him to embrace the change while introducing him to Suzanne. Collignon comes in with Lucien; Amélie, unable to stomach the cruelty he shows his assistant, feeds him a fig tart, causing him to hallucinate a nightmare. He profusely apologizes to Lucien for his abuse and admits that he is deeply flawed. Joseph and Georgette emerge from the loo, disheveled. Amélie travels around Paris, spray-painting quotes from Hipolito's unpublished works and reflecting on her journey thus far ("Times Are Hard For Dreamers"). Later that night, Hipolito sees a quote from his unpublished work and swells with pride ("Writing On The Wall"). As she watches from a distance, Amélie finds one of Nino's flyers and is outraged.

She sends Nino another message to meet her at 5 pm at the Montmartre Carousel with another riddle. When Nino shows up, he is met with a series of blue arrows guiding him upwards to a telescope on the top of the hill ("Blue Arrow Suite"). Through the telescope, he sees Amélie returning his album to the basket on his bicycle; by the time he races back down, she is gone. A payphone rings. He answers and Amélie tells him that the man in the photo album who keeps reappearing is a ghost. Despite her attempts to keep the game going, Nino pleads that they meet in person or else he is hanging up. She says to meet him the following Tuesday at 2 pm at the Two Windmills Café.

At the appointed time, Nino is late. Amélie worries about what might've happened to him, her imagined scenario spiraling out of control ("The Late Nino Quincampoix"). Nino does show up, and when he does, she tries to hide. When he asks about her masked photo, she denies her identity, but ultimately runs to the bathroom. Frustrated, tired, and hurt, Nino leaves, and Gina chases after him. Amélie comes out from hiding and Joseph convinces her that Nino left with Gina; she runs out, heartbroken, and Georgette breaks up with Joseph. Gina returns with Nino who thinks Amélie is still in the bathroom. The ladies interrogate him to make sure he is a suitable suitor for Amélie ("A Better Haircut"). After admitting his love for her and his belief that she truly understands him, they give him Amélie's home address, confessing that she is no longer in the bathroom.

Back home, Dufayel asks about Nino; Amélie snaps at him, telling him to mind his own business and to paint his own painting rather than obsessively copy Renoir's. In response, he tells her to "live [her] own life instead of the lives of others." Alone, she promises to leave Paris to live in further isolation. Nino shows up at her door and though she doesn't want him to leave, she doesn't want to let him in either. He begs her to stop suppressing her feelings and to let him inside ("Stay"). Dufayel calls, telling her to look out of her window; he shows her that he had finally painted an original work of art: a portrait of Amélie. He urges her to open the door for Nino or she'll never find love. She obeys. Very gingerly, Nino and Amélie approach one another and kiss ("Halfway–Reprise"). Saying she has a surprise, Amélie takes Nino to a photobooth that is out of order. A repairman shows up and it is the man in all of the photos, test runs to check that the booth works properly; Nino thanks Amélie for solving the mystery. As they take photos in the newly fixed booth, Amélie and Nino reflect on their newfound happiness and wonder what the future holds for them. A last bit of narration reveals that Raphael finally sets off on an international trip–with Suzanne. The company reminds Amélie and Nino and themselves that everyone and everything is connected in ways we do not know. The future may be unclear, but they will face it together ("Where Do We Go From Here?").

== Songs and recordings ==
=== Broadway production ===
An original Broadway cast recording of the show was released by Warner Classics, digitally on May 19 and physically on June 9, 2017.

- "Times Are Hard for Dreamers (Prologue)" - Young Amelie, Company
- "World's Best Dad" - Young Amelie, Raphael
- "World's Best Friend" - Young Amelie, Amandine, Fluffy
- "World's Best Mom" - Young Amelie, Amandine
- "Times Are Hard For Dreamers" - Amelie
- "The Commute" - Company
- "The Bottle Drops" - Young Amelie, Amelie, Company
- "Three Figs" - Lucien
- "The Girl With the Glass" - Dufayel, Amelie
- "How to Tell Time" - Amelie, Bretodeau, Company
- "Tour de France" - Amelie, Company
- "Goodbye, Amelie" - Amelie, "Elton John," Chorus
- "Backyard" - Amelie, Raphael
- "When the Booth Goes Bright" - Nino
- "Sister's Pickle" - Amelie
- "Halfway" - Young Amelie, Amelie
- "Window Seat" - Amelie, Gina, Gina's Husband, Company
- "There's No Place Like Gnome" - Gnome, Company
- "Thin Air" - Nino
- "Blue Arrow Suite" - Amelie
- "The Late Nino Quincampoix" - Amelie, Chorus
- "A Better Haircut" - Gina, Suzanne, Georgette, Nino
- "Stay" - Amelie, Nino
- "Halfway" (Reprise) - Amelie
- "Where Do We Go From Here" - Amelie, Nino, Company

Source: IBDB

=== UK production ===
The Original London Cast Recording was released by Concord Records digitally on June 5, 2020.

Act I

- "The Flight of the Blue Fly"‡ – Company
- "World's Best Papa" – Raphael, Amélie, Amandine
- "World's Best Friend" † – Amélie, Fluffy
- "World's Best Mama" † – Amélie, Amandine, Company
- "Post Mortem"* – Amélie, Company
- "The Sound of Going Round in Circles"‡ – Amélie, Company
- "The Commute Home" – Hipolito, Amélie, Company
- "When the Booth Goes Bright" – Nino, Company
- "The Bottle Drops" – Amélie, Company
- "Three Figs" † – Lucien
- "The Girl With the Glass" – Dufayel, Amélie
- "How to Tell Time" – Amélie, Bretodeau
- "Tour de France" – Amélie, Blind Beggar, Company
- "Goodbye, Amélie" – Elton John, Company

Act II

- "Half Asleep"* – Amélie, Nino, Company
- "Backyard" – Amélie, Raphael
- "Sister's Pickle" – Amélie
- "Halfway" – Amélie, Amandine
- "Window Seat" – Gina, Amélie, Hipolito, Suzanne
- "Thin Air" – Nino, Company
- "There's No Place Like Gnome" – Gnome, Raphael, Company
- "Times Are Hard For Dreamers" – Amélie
- "Writing On The Wall"† – Company
- "Blue Arrow Suite" – Amélie, Company
- "The Late Nino Quincampoix" – Amélie, Suzanne, Gina, Georgette, Joseph, Hipolito
- "A Better Haircut" – Suzanne, Georgette, Gina, Nino
- "Stay" – Amélie, Nino, Company
- "Halfway (Reprise)" – Amélie, Nino, Company
- "Where Do We Go From Here?" – Amélie, Nino, Company

* New material; † Not included on Original Cast Recording; ‡ Reinstated from out-of-town tryouts

Source: Spotify

== Original casts ==
Character	Berkeley	Los Angeles	Broadway	Off-West End	West End
Character	2015	2016	2017	2019	2021
Amélie Poulain	Samantha Barks	Phillipa Soo	Phillipa Soo	Audrey Brisson	Audrey Brisson
Young Amélie Poulain	Savvy Crawford	Savvy Crawford	Savvy Crawford	featured as a puppet	featured as a puppet
Nino Quincampoix	Adam Chanler-Berat	Adam Chanler-Berat	Adam Chanler-Berat	Chris Jared	Chris Jared
Julien Dufayel / Collignon	Tony Sheldon	Tony Sheldon	Tony Sheldon	Johnson Willis	Johnson Willis
Raphaël Poulain / Bretodeau	John Hickock	Manoel Felciano	Manoel Felciano	Jez Unwin	Jez Unwin
Amandine Poulain / Philomene	Alison Cimmet	Alison Cimmet	Alison Cimmet	Rachel Dawson	Rachel Dawson
Suzanne	Maria-Christina Oliveras	Harriett D. Foy	Harriett D. Foy	Kate Robson-Stuart	Kate Robson-Stuart
Gina	Carla Duren	Maria-Christina Oliveras	Maria-Christina Oliveras	Sophie Crawford	Sioned Saunders
Georgette / Sylvie / Collignon's Mother	Alyse Alan Louis	Alyse Alan Louis	Alyse Alan Louis	Faoileann Cunningham	Flora Spencer-Longhurst
Blind Beggar / Garden Gnome / Anchorperson	David Andino	David Andino	David Andino	Josh Sneesby	Jack Quarton
Hipolito / Belgian Tourist / Elton John	Randy Blair	Randy Blair	Randy Blair	Caolan McCarthy	Caolan McCarthy
Joseph / Fluffy / Collignon's Father	Paul Whitty	Paul Whitty	Paul Whitty	Samuel Morgan-Grahame	Samuel Morgan-Grahame
Lucien / Adrien Wells / Mysterious Man	Perry Sherman	Heath Calvert	Heath Calvert	Oliver Grant	Oliver Grant

== Critical reception ==
The San Francisco Chronicle gave the Berkeley production of the show a rave review, saying "wit crackles and charm fills the house…in this seamless blend of visual, narrative and performance delights."

On Broadway, the show received mixed reviews, often praising Soo, the cast and design elements of the show, but being critical of the score. According to The New York Times, "The musical, adapted from the 2001 film about a shy but whimsically altruistic French waitress, had struggled at the box office since opening to underwhelming reviews. Without a single Tony nomination in a competitive Broadway season, an uptick in sales was unlikely."

The London production received much more positive reviews, with many praising the re-orchestrations, the actor-muso approach, and Audrey Brisson's lead performance; WhatsOnStage called the show "a fanciful Valentine to the City of Light, and...a celebration of the unbeatable power of live music". This production was nominated for three Olivier Awards, including Best New Musical and the Grammy Award for Best Musical Theatre Album.

== Awards and nominations ==
=== Original Broadway production ===
Year	Award	Category	Result
2017	Drama League Award	Distinguished Production of a Musical	Nominated

=== Original London production ===
Year	Award	Category	Nominee	Result
2020	Laurence Olivier Award	Best New Musical		Nominated
2020	Laurence Olivier Award	Best Actress in a Musical	Audrey Brisson	Nominated
2020	Laurence Olivier Award	Best Original Score or New Orchestrations	Barnaby Race	Nominated
2021	Grammy Award	Best Musical Theater Album	Audrey Brisson, Michael Fentiman, Sean Patrick Flahaven, Chris Jared, Daniel Messé, Caolan McCarthy, Barnaby Race, Nathan Tysen and Jez Unwin	Nominated
