= The Women of Llanrumney =

2024 play by Azuka Oforka

- The cover of the play text, featuring cast member Suzanne Packer
- Written by: Azuka Oforka
- Characters: Annie; Cerys; Elizabeth Morgan; Simon Taylor; Tommy Flynn; Mr Ainsworth
- Subject: Slavery
- Setting: The Llanrumney Estate and Plantation at St. Mary, Jamaica, in 1765

Premiere
- Date: 16 May 2024
- Place: Sherman Theatre, Cardiff
- Directed by: Patricia Logue
- Original run: 16 May – 1 June 2024

The Women of Llanrumney is the debut play by writer Azuka Oforka, premiered at the Sherman Theatre in Cardiff in 2024. The play was later transferred to Theatre Royal Stratford East in London in 2025. It was shortlisted for the 2024 Alfred Fagon Award and made Oforka a joint-winner of the Stage Debut Award for Best Writer in the same year.

== Background ==
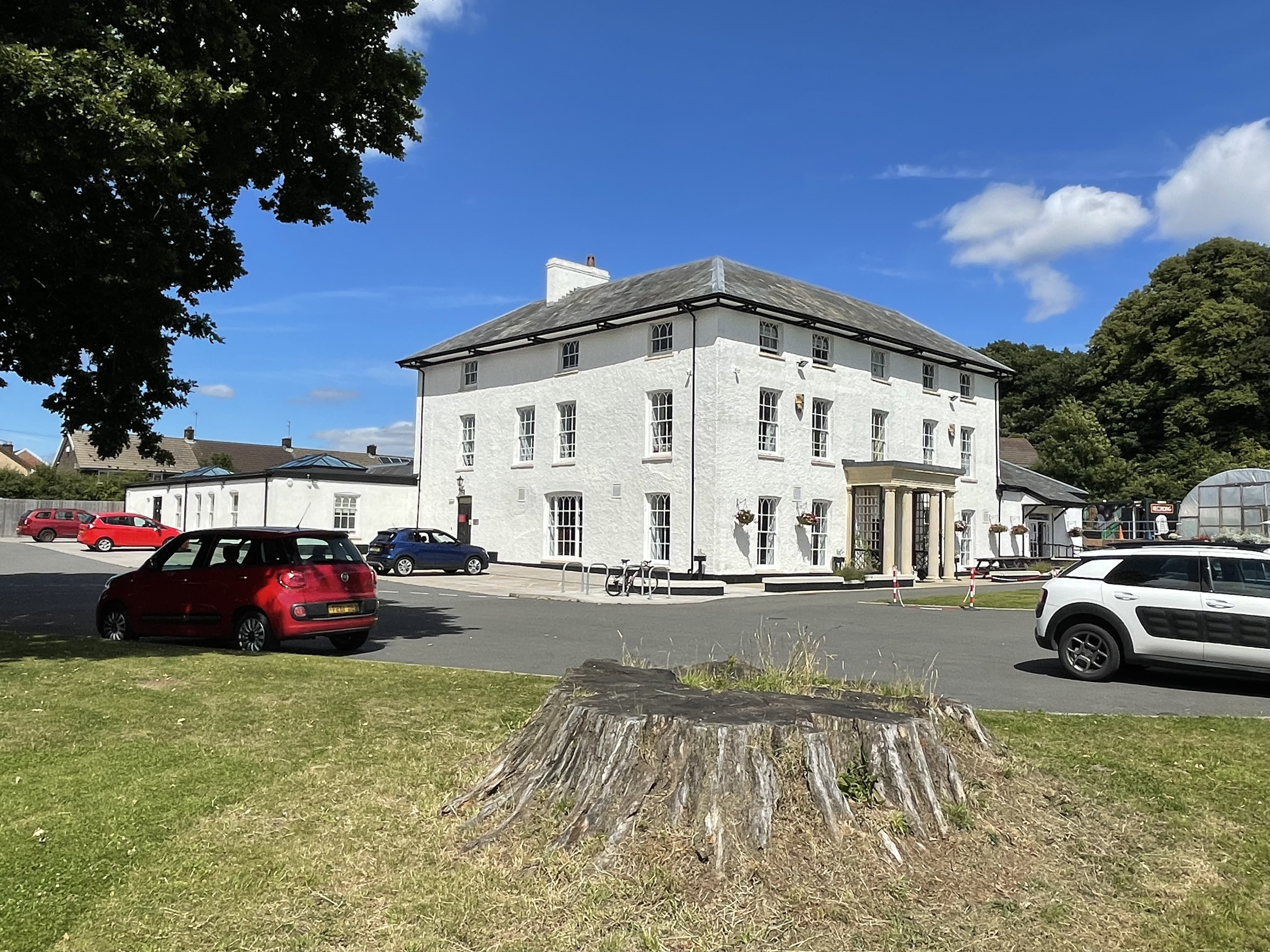
Llanrumney Hall, Cardiff

Writer and actress Azuka Oforka grew up in London but moved to Cardiff in 2012 and has resided in Wales since. She was inspired to write The Women of Llanrumney following her visit to Llanrumney Hall in Cardiff, where she saw a portrait of Captain Henry Morgan, described simply as "Lieutenant Governor of Jamaica" without any references to his role as an enslaver. She wrote the play as a way to confront Britain and especially Wales's complicity in chattel slavery and colonialism, which is often hidden and forgotten. Oforka had herself been unaware of the full extent of Morgan's legacy of slavery until she researched for the play.

== Synopsis ==
Following the death of Welshman Henry Morgan (taking place prior to the events of the play), his Llanrumney Estate and sugar plantation at St. Mary, Jamaica was inherited by his widow and cousin Elizabeth, who also became the owner of enslaved people at the estate. Annie and her daughter Cerys are the enslaved housekeepers, the latter of whom has recently moved to the position from working on the field. Their future and potential prospect of freedom hangs in the balance when Elizabeth faces the prospect of losing her estate due to financial troubles.

=== Characters ===
The characters of the play were:

- Annie: an enslaved housekeeper at the Llanrumney Estate
- Cerys: Annie's daughter, an enslaved housekeeper at the estate who previously worked on the field
- Elizabeth: Annie and Cerys's enslaver and widow of Henry Morgan, from whom she inherited the estate
- Simon Taylor: a rival plantation owner and enslaver at St. Mary who offered to buy the Llanrumney Estate
- Tommy Flynn: an Irish former indentured servant at the Llanrumney Estate
- Mr Ainsworth: Elizabeth's potential suitor

== Production history ==
The Women of Llanrumney was premiered at Sherman Theatre in Cardiff on 16 May 2024 and ran until 1 June the same year. The following year, the play was staged at Theatre Royal Stratford East in London, where it ran for four weeks from 19 March to 12 April. This was followed by a revival production at Sherman from 24 April until 14 May, extended beyond the previously announced closing date of 10 May due to popular demand.

Cast members of the 2024 and 2025 productions were:

Character(s)	Original 2024 production	2025 production
Character(s)	Sherman Theatre	Theatre Royal Stratford East and Sherman Theatre
Annie	Suzanne Packer	Suzanne Packer
Cerys	Keziah Joseph	Shvorne Marks
Elizabeth	Nia Roberts	Nia Roberts
Simon Taylor / Tommy Flynn / Mr Ainsworth	Matthew Gravelle	Matthew Gravelle

== Critical reception ==
The Women of Llanrumney enjoyed sold-out performances across its three runs and such was its popularity that the revival production at Sherman in 2025 was extended. It received an average audience rating of 88% on Show-Score. The play also received overwhelmingly positive reviews across major British publications, including The Telegraph, The Evening Standard, and WhatsOnStage.com. Notably, in a 5 star review of the original production, Gareth Llŷr Evans from The Guardian praised the "astute and fearless performances" of the cast as well as the "conceptually brilliant" writing by Oforka, who he named as "an urgent and important voice in Welsh theatre".

The play was mentioned by Welsh Labour politician Lee Waters in an open debate about arts and culture in Wales at the Senedd on 18 June 2025. He said:

"Azuka Oforka, a new playwright, gave me a piece of theatre I will never forget. The Women of Llanrumney was a searing and intimate tale of slavery, its links with Wales, its disfiguring impact on people's souls and, ultimately, a rebellion against it. It spoke to me in a way a book or a song simply could not."

== Awards and nominations ==
Year	Awards	Category	Nominee(s)	Result	Note
2024	Alfred Fagon Award		Azuka Oforka	Shortlisted	
2024	The Stage Debut Awards	Best Writer	Azuka Oforka	Won	
2025	Black British Theatre Awards	Best Female Lead in a Play	Suzanne Packer	Nominated	
2025	Black British Theatre Awards	Best Musical Director	Stella-Jane Odoemelam	Won	
2025	Standard Theatre Awards	Most promising playwright	Azuka Oforka	Nominated	
2026	Offie	Industry and Inclusion	Azuka Oforka	Nominated	
