= Audrey Brisson =

French-Canadian actress

Audrey Brisson-Jutras is a French-Canadian actress and acrobat, known as a performer and acrobat for the Cirque du Soleil and for playing Amélie in the UK production of Amélie, for which she was nominated for an Olivier Award.

== Early life and education ==
Brisson is the daughter of Canadian composer Benoit Jutras, composer and music director for many of the Cirque du Soleil contemporary shows. As a child and teenager Brisson worked with the Cirque du Soleil, both as a vocalist and an acrobat.

She trained at the Central School of Speech and Drama in London.

== Stage career ==
Brisson made her UK theatre debut in 2012 in The Lion, the Witch and the Wardrobe as Miss Hedgehog.

Brisson played Dea in The Grinning Man, when the show opened at the Bristol Old Vic in 2016. The cast included Louis Maskell, who also played the role in the London transfer of the show, as Grinpayne, Julian Bleach as Barkilphedro, Patrycja Kujawska as Queen Angelica and Gloria Onitiri and Stuart Neal as the royal siblings.

In 2017 she took the role of Jiminy Cricket in the National Theatre version of Carlo Collodi's Pinocchio, with new book by John Tiffany.

In the same year Brisson also played Bella Chagall in The Flying Lovers of Vitebsk both at the Edinburgh Fringe and at the Bristol Old Vic, show focusing on the young Marc and Bella Chagall navigating their difficult life, and created by theatre company Kneehigh.

She originated the title role in Amélie when the show was retooled for a UK premiere in 2019, which opened at the Watermill Theatre in Newbury before embarking on tour and closing out 2020 with a London premiere at The Other Palace. In 2021 she reprised the role when it transferred to the Criterion Theatre in the West End where it ran from May to September for a limited engagement. The show's development team drew from Brisson's circus career by implementing a flying lampshade for her to swing from as well as her French-Canadian heritage by rewriting some of the script to be spoken in her native language of French. The final production presented some slight differences compared to the Broadway version, starting with the cast using French accents during the show, as well as the show being presented as more intimate, with more "French" instruments and musicality.

In 2022 she starred in Reading Rep Theatre's production of Jekyll & Hyde, Gary McNair's adaptation of Robert Louis Stevenson's novella for solo performance. She was also part of the company of Into the Woods at the Theatre Royal in Bath, where she played Cinderella, alongside Julian Bleach as the Mysterious Man, Nicola Hughes as the Witch, Rhashan Stone as the Baker and Alex Young as the Baker's Wife.

=== Stage credits ===
Year	Production	Role	Location	Category
2012	The Lion, The Witch and The Wardrobe	Miss Hedgehog	Kensington Gardens	Regional
2016	The Grinning Man	Dea	Bristol Old Vic	Regional
2017	Pinocchio	Jiminy Cricket	National Theatre, Lyttelton	Regional
2017	La Strada	Gelsomina	Belgrade theatre, Coventry	Regional
2017–2020	The Flying Lovers of Vitebsk	Bella Chagall	Bristol Old Vic and Live Stream	Regional
2019–2021	Amélie	Amélie Poulain	Watermill Theatre	Regional
2019–2021	Amélie	Amélie Poulain	The Other Palace	Off-West End
2019–2021	Amélie	Amélie Poulain	Criterion Theatre	West End
2022	Into the Woods	Cinderella	Theatre Royal, Bath	Regional
2022	Jekyll & Hyde	Gabriel John Utterson	Reading Rep Theatre	Regional
2023	The Land of Might-Have-Been	Vera Brittain	Buxton Opera House	Regional

1996 / 2000 - Quidam by Cirque du Soleil - Zoe (singer) - Big Top / Original Touring Cast.

|- |2025 |Paddington |Bear Movement Coordinator |Savoy Theater |West End

=== Television ===
Year	Production	Role	Notes
2025	A Cruel Love: The Ruth Ellis Story	Jacqueline	2 episodes

== Awards and nominations ==
Year	Award	Category	Work	Result
2019	UK Theatre Awards	Best Performance in a Musical	Amélie	Nominated
2020	Olivier Awards	Best Actress in a Musical	Amélie	Nominated
2021	Grammy Awards	Best Musical Theatre Album	Amélie	Nominated

== Personal life ==
Brisson is in a relationship with fellow actor Chris Jared, whom she met when the two were cast in Amélie as Amélie and Nino respectively. They had a daughter in 2020, whose name pays tribute to the show in which they were brought together.
