= Simon Woods =

British actor and writer (born 1980)

- Born: 7 January 1980 (age 46)
- Education: Eton College
- Alma mater: Magdalen College, Oxford
- Occupations: Actor; playwright
- Spouse: Christopher Bailey (m. 2012)
- Children: 2

Simon Woods (born 7 January 1980) is an English actor and playwright best known for his role as Octavian in Season 2 of the British-American television series Rome and the 2005 Pride & Prejudice as Charles Bingley.

== Personal life ==
Woods attended Eton College, then read English at Magdalen College, Oxford. While at Oxford, he became friends with Chelsea Clinton. After graduating from Oxford, Woods worked briefly at The Guardian before becoming an actor.

While at Oxford in 2000, he was in a relationship with Rosamund Pike that lasted two years. The two later played lovers Jane Bennet and Charles Bingley in Pride & Prejudice.

Since 2009, Woods has been in a relationship with Christopher Bailey, the former chief executive of the British fashion house Burberry. They married in 2012. They have two daughters, Iris and Nell.

== Filmography ==
Year	Film/TV	Role	Notes
2003	Charles II: The Power and the Passion	Captain Churchill	TV, 1 episode
2003	Cambridge Spies	Charlie Givens	TV, 1 episode
2004	Foyle's War	Greville Woods	TV, 1 episode
2005	The Queen's Sister	Roddy Llewellyn	TV
2005	Elizabeth I	Gifford	TV, 1 episode
2005	Pride & Prejudice	Mr. Charles Bingley	
2005	Twisted Tales	Zak	TV
2006	Spooks	Rowan	TV, 2 episodes
2006	Starter for 10	Josh	
2006	Penelope	Edward Vanderman	
2007	Cranford	Dr. Harrison	TV, 5 episodes
2007	Rome	Gaius Octavian Caesar	TV, 7 episodes
2007	Angel	Clive Fennelly	
2007	I Want Candy	Film Actor	
2008	Sunny and the Elephant	Nicolas	
2008	A Previous Engagement	Tyler	
2024	Such a Lovely Day		Director short film

== Playwright ==
Woods's stage play Hansard was presented at the Lyttelton Theatre, London, in September 2019. The work, named after the official record of proceedings in the British parliament, was directed by Simon Godwin.
