= The Ocean at the End of the Lane =

2013 novel by Neil Gaiman

- First edition hardcover for the United States
- Author: Neil Gaiman
- Language: English
- Subject: Good and evil, survival, magic
- Genre: Dark fantasy, surrealism, horror, magical realism
- Publisher: William Morrow and Company
- Publication date: 18 June 2013
- Publication place: United States
- Media type: Print, ebook, audiobook
- Pages: 178 pp
- Award: Locus Award for Best Fantasy Novel (2014)
- ISBN: 9780062255655

The Ocean at the End of the Lane is a 2013 novel by British author Neil Gaiman. The work was first published on 18 June 2013 through William Morrow and Company and follows an unnamed man who returns to his hometown for a funeral and remembers events that began forty years earlier. The illustrated edition of the work was published on 5 November 2019, featuring the artwork of Australian fine artist Elise Hurst.

Themes in The Ocean at the End of the Lane include the search for self-identity and the "disconnect between childhood and adulthood".

Among other honours, it was voted Book of the Year in the British National Book Awards.

== Plot summary ==
The book starts with the unnamed protagonist returning to his childhood hometown for a funeral. There he revisits the area in which he and his sister grew up and remembers a young girl named Lettie Hempstock, who had claimed that the pond behind her house was an ocean. He stops at the house where Lettie had lived with her mother and grandmother and encounters a member of her family and starts to remember forgotten incidents from the past.

The main narrative starts as he recalls a time when an opal miner, who was living at the boy's home, steals the narrator's father's car and commits suicide in the back seat, having gambled away his friends' money; this death allows a supernatural being to gain access to the narrator's world, leaving money for people in unpleasant ways.

After a coin becomes lodged in the narrator's throat overnight, choking him, he seeks his neighbour Lettie's help. She agrees to help, insisting that he accompany her on the travel necessary to find the spirit and bind it. Having been instructed never to let go of her hand, in a moment of surprise he does, and in that instant something lodges in his foot. Once home, he pulls what appears to be a worm out of his foot, but a piece is left inside him.

The next day, his mother tells him she is starting a new job as an optometrist and a woman named Ursula Monkton is to look after him and his sister. The narrator takes an instant dislike to her and soon realises that she is actually the worm he had pulled out of his foot. She had used him as a way to travel out of the place he and Lettie had visited and is now inhabiting his house. Ursula quickly ingratiates herself with his family, winning over his sister and seducing his father, while the narrator is alienated from his family and is almost drowned in the bath by his father as Ursula watches.

Most of the narrator's time is then spent locked up in his bedroom, avoiding Ursula. Frightened, he manages to escape one night. He barely makes it to the Hempstock farm, where the Hempstocks take care of him and remove the wormhole from his foot, which had been left behind by Ursula as an escape path. Lettie and the narrator confront Ursula, who refuses offers from the Hempstocks to leave peacefully for a world that is less dangerous for her. Unwilling to believe that there could be anything in the world that could harm her, Ursula is attacked and eliminated by "hunger birds", entities that serve a purpose similar to scavengers. These insist on eating the narrator's heart, as a piece of Ursula's wormhole still remains there. The Hempstocks bring him back to the safety of their property through the ocean by their house, which Lettie carries to him in a bucket. While in the ocean, the narrator understands the nature of all things, but the memory fades once he gets out.

The Hempstocks promise to keep him safe, but the hunger birds begin to eat his world to force him off the property. This proves effective and the narrator attempts to sacrifice himself, only for Lettie to jump in between him and the hunger birds. Lettie's grandmother threatens the hunger birds, which she refers to as "varmints" who have committed a major transgression by attacking Lettie in their attempt to get to the narrator, with annihilation if they do not leave. They comply, but Lettie is near death as a result of their attack. The Hempstocks place Lettie's body in the ocean behind their house, where they say that she will rest until ready to return to the narrator's world. After these events, the narrator's memory of the incident fades. He has no recollection of Lettie's near-death, instead believing that she had gone to Australia.

The book then returns to the present, where the narrator finishes his remembering and is shocked when the Hempstocks inform him that this is not his first time returning to the house – he had visited the house at least twice during his adult years and it is implied that he visited the farm at least once more before that to return a kitten that he had found during his initial travels with Lettie. It is suggested that the hunger birds did eat his heart after all, but Lettie's sacrifice revived him, and his heart has been slowly growing back ever since. His visits to the farm are the result of Lettie wanting to check up on him while she sleeps and heals. The narrator's concern over the unremembered visits soon fades as he begins to forget the past events once again, telling the Hempstock women to tell Lettie he said "hello" if she contacts them from Australia.

== Development ==
Gaiman has said that members of the Hempstock family have shown up in several of his other works, such as Stardust and The Graveyard Book. He began writing Ocean for his ex-wife Amanda Palmer and did not initially intend for it to become a novel, instead intending to write a novella; while writing, he inserted things that he knew Palmer would enjoy, as she "doesn't really like fantasy". Some events in the book were drawn from Gaiman's childhood, such as a person killing themselves in a car belonging to the protagonist's father. Palmer later said that the book's depiction of child abuse drew from Gaiman's childhood in the Church of Scientology, after she encouraged him to confront his childhood upbringing, and the book is dedicated to her with the inscription "to Amanda, who wanted to know."

Gaiman has confirmed that The Ocean at the End of the Lane can be seen as part three of a trilogy, the other two parts being Violent Cases and The Tragical Comedy or Comical Tragedy of Mr. Punch.

== Reception ==
Critical reception for the book has been generally positive.

The New York Times gave a positive review for The Ocean at the End of the Lane, commenting that the book would appeal to multiple age groups. USA Today stated that the novel was thematically similar to Gaiman's 2002 children's novel Coraline and the 2005 film MirrorMask in that the enemy is "closer than they might think", which "makes his monsters that much more sinister when a woman like Ursula is just downstairs".

== Awards and honours ==
=== End of year ===
- 2013 Kirkus Reviews, The Best Books of 2013 (100 titles)
- 2013 The New York Times Best Seller list, No. 1 Hardcover Fiction.

=== Literary awards ===
Year	Award	Category	Result	Ref
2013	Goodreads Choice Awards	Fantasy	Won	
2013	National Book Awards (British)	Book of the Year	Won	
2013	Nebula Award	Novel	Shortlisted	
2014	Locus Award	Fantasy Novel	Won	
2014	World Fantasy Award	Novel	Shortlisted	

== Stage adaptation ==
The novel was adapted for the stage by the writer Joel Horwood and director Katy Rudd in 2019, after first contacting Gaiman three years earlier. The play opened in London's West End on 11 December at the Royal National Theatre's smallest theatre, the Dorfman, after preview performances from 3 December. Music in the play is by Jherek Bischoff, who also works with Gaiman's ex-wife Amanda Palmer.

The show returned for a limited seven-week season at the Noël Coward Theatre from 11 October to 25 November 2023.

== Film adaptation ==
In February 2013, ahead of the novel's publication, Focus Features acquired the rights to adapt it into a feature film. Tom Hanks and Gary Goetzman were announced to be producing through their company Playtone, and Joe Wright was attached to direct. As of June 2019, the film has not had further development updates.

Henry Selick, who called The Ocean at the End of the Lane "Neil Gaiman's best book", made an attempt to adapt it into a stop-motion animated feature, and wrote a 50-page script. He expressed hope that he would eventually produce it. In June 2024, Selick and Gaiman announced development on a stop-motion animated feature film adaptation. Selick confirmed the existence of a 35-page treatment and numerous artwork and conceptual designs, as well as confirming interest from studios ShadowMachine and Laika, LLC. In August 2024, Selick implied the project was back in limbo, saying in an interview while promoting the theatrical re-release of Coraline, "I would hope that it might still come together, but I have no predictions." As of January 2025, Selick is reportedly still working on the film, despite Gaiman being faced with multiple accusations of sexual assault.

== Cultural references ==
In Portsmouth, UK, where Gaiman's family had a chain of grocery stores, a short connecting stretch of road is officially named The Ocean at the End of the Lane.
