= Hansard (play) =

2019 play by Simon Woods

- Original language: English
- Written by: Simon Woods
- Characters: Robin Hesketh; Diana Hesketh
- Genre: Drama
- Setting: Cotswolds

Premiere
- Date: 3 September 2019
- Place: Royal National Theatre, London
- Official website

Hansard is a play by Simon Woods. The play focuses on fictional Tory politician Robin Hesketh and his wife, Diana. The title comes from the word Hansard, the traditional name of the transcripts of Parliamentary debates in Britain and many Commonwealth countries.

== Productions ==
Hansard had its opening night at the National Theatre on 3 September 2019, following previews from 22 August. It played a limited run to 25 November 2019. The two-hander featured Alex Jennings as Robin Hesketh and Lindsay Duncan as Diana Hesketh. The production was directed by Simon Godwin. Hansard was broadcast as part of National Theatre Live on 7 November 2019.

== Critical reception ==
The play received mixed reviews. In a 3 star review for The Guardian, Michael Billington likened the piece to a Cotswold Who’s Afraid of Virginia Woolf? In a 3 star review for the Financial Times, Sarah Hemming states "It’s obliquely timely, then, often waspishly funny, ultimately very moving and beautifully delivered by the superb Alex Jennings and Lindsay Duncan. Yet there’s also something oddly unsatisfying about it"
