= Andy Stanton =

English children's writer

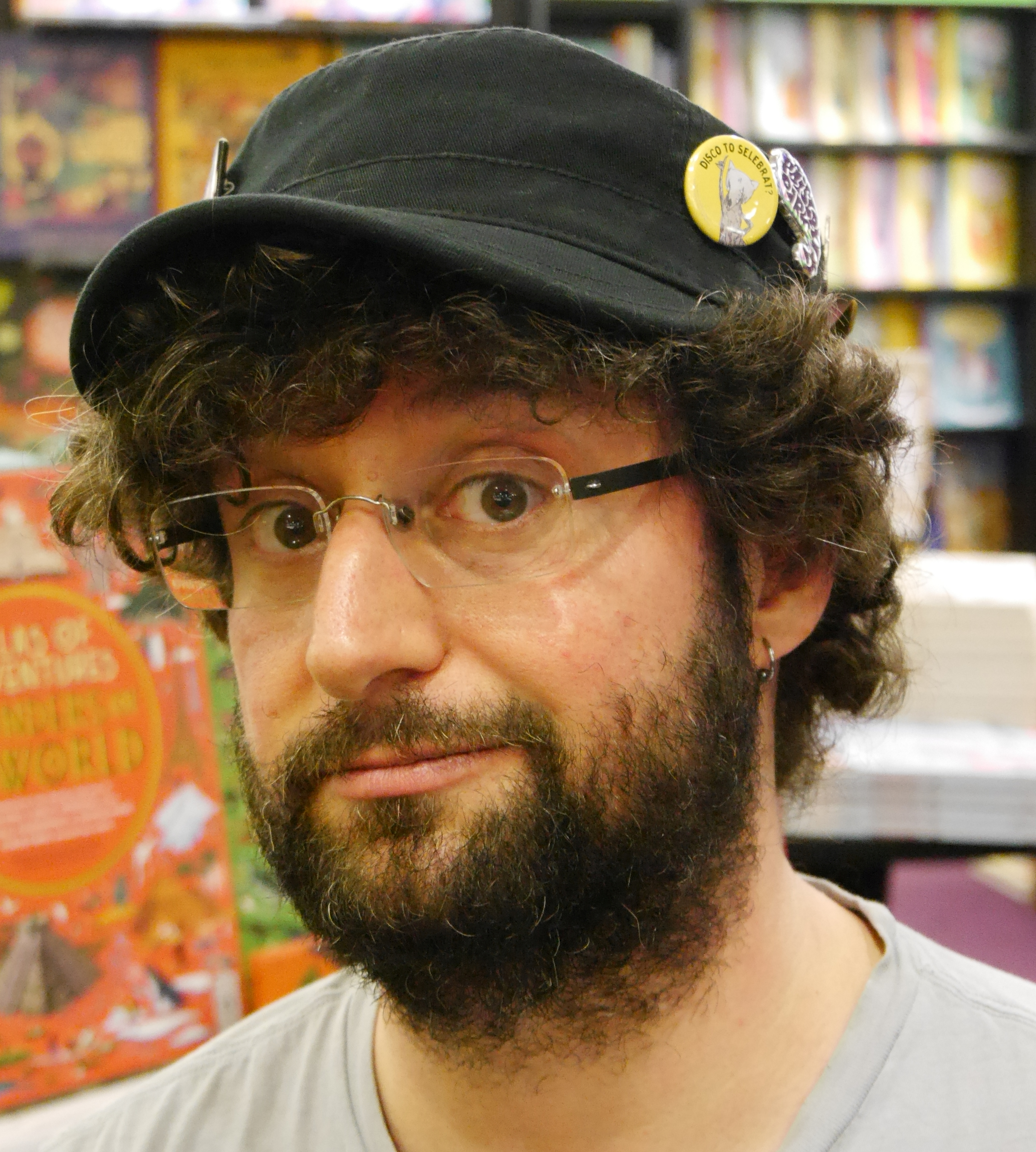
- Stanton in Waterstones, Piccadilly, London, 2018
- Born: Andy Joel Stanton; 14 November 1973 (age 52); London, England
- Education: Oxford University
- Occupation: Children's author
- Writing career
- Language: English
- Notable work: Mr Gum series
- Notable awards: Red House Children's Book Award (Overall); 2007 You're a Bad Man, Mr Gum! – author Red House Children's Book Award (Younger Readers); 2007 You're a Bad Man, Mr Gum! – author Blue Peter Book Award for Most Fun Story with Pictures; 2007 You're a Bad Man, Mr Gum! – author Roald Dahl Funny Prize; 2008 Mr Gum and the Dancing Bear – author
- Website: www.mrgum.co.uk

Andy Joel Stanton (born 14 November 1973) is an English children's writer. He is best known for writing the Mr Gum series (illustrated by David Tazzyman), through which he made a popular contribution to children's literature. Stanton's writing is influenced by Roald Dahl and Enid Blyton.

== Life ==
Stanton grew up in the London suburbs of Harrow and Pinner and attended Latymer Upper School in Hammersmith. He studied English at Oxford University, but was "kicked out". He has worked as a film script reader, a cartoonist, and as a temporary medical secretary for the NHS.

== Works ==
=== Mr Gum ===
==== Books ====
The Mr Gum books are set in the fictitious town of Lamonic Bibber. The town has its own fictional newspaper, The Lamonical Chronicle, which features on the Mr Gum website as "Lamonic Bibber's second best and only paper". Characters in the books include Old King Thunderbelly and Polly. The books have won numerous prizes including the 2007 Red House Children's Book Award, two Blue Peter Book Awards for Best Book With Pictures, and the inaugural Roald Dahl Funny Prize in 2008 for Mr Gum and the Dancing Bear.

Stanton has written nine books in the Mr Gum series, published by Egmont Books in the UK and illustrated by Tazzyman:

- You're a Bad Man, Mr Gum! (2006)
- Mr Gum and the Biscuit Billionaire (2007)
- Mr Gum and the Goblins (2007)
- Mr Gum and the Power Crystals (2008)
- Mr Gum and the Dancing Bear (2008)
- What's for Dinner, Mr Gum? (2009)
- Mr Gum and the Cherry Tree (2010)
- Mr Gum and the Secret Hideout (2011)
- Mr Gum and the Hound of Lamonic Bibber (2011)

You're a Bad Man, Mr Gum! and Mr Gum and the Hound of Lamonic Bibber were later rereleased as special editions, featuring stickers.

==== Audiobooks ====
The eight main books in the Mr Gum series were recorded as audiobooks produced and directed by David Tyler for BBC Audio, with the author himself reading. Additionally, the first four books in the series were recorded, with Kate Winslet narrating, in 2012.

==== Stage ====
Stanton wrote the book and lyrics for Mr Gum and the Dancing Bear - The Musical! which premiered at the National Theatre in July 2019.

In 2022, the Magdeburg Theater staged a stage version of "Mr Gum and the Cherry Tree", followed in 2023 by "Mr Gum and the Secret Hideout".

=== Other books ===
Additionally, Stanton has written several other books published by various publishers:

- Danny McGee Drinks the Sea (2016)
- Natboff! One Million Years of Stupidity (2018)
- When I Was a Child (2019)
- The Paninis of Pompeii (2019)
- Going to the Volcano (2020)
- The Story of Matthew Buzzington (2021)
- Sterling and the Canary (2021)
- Benny the Blue Whale: One Author's Descent into the Madness of AI (2023)

== Personal life ==
Stanton is Jewish. Stanton is one of 12 presidents of Better Planet Education.
