= La Strada (2017 stage adaptation) =

- Written by: Federico Fellini (film); Ennio Flaiano (film); Tullio Pinelli (film); Devised by the company Songs by Benji Bower; Mike Akers (writer in the room)
- Original language: English

Premiere
- Date premiered: 13 February 2017
- Place premiered: Belgrade Theatre, Coventry

La Strada is a play with music based on the 1954 Italian film of the same name by Federico Fellini (with Ennio Flaiano and Tullio Pinelli). The play was adapted by the company at the Belgrade Theatre, Coventry, with Mike Akers as the writer in the room with music by Benji Bower. This form of theatre was applied by the same creative team for the Bristol Old Vic productions of Treasure Island, Jane Eyre and Peter Pan (the latter two being co-produced with National Theatre).

It premiered in 2017, directed by Sally Cookson, produced by Kenny Wax Limited in association with Cambridge Arts Theatre and Bristol Old Vic with the Belgrade Theatre, Coventry, where it ran from 13 to 18 February 2017 before embarking on a UK national tour. In The Guardian, Michael Billington commented that "the lead performers effortlessly overcome one's memories of the movie."

The piece debuted in London at The Other Palace on 30 May 2017, where it ran until 8 July 2017.
