= The Other Palace =

Theatre in London, England

- Official Logo

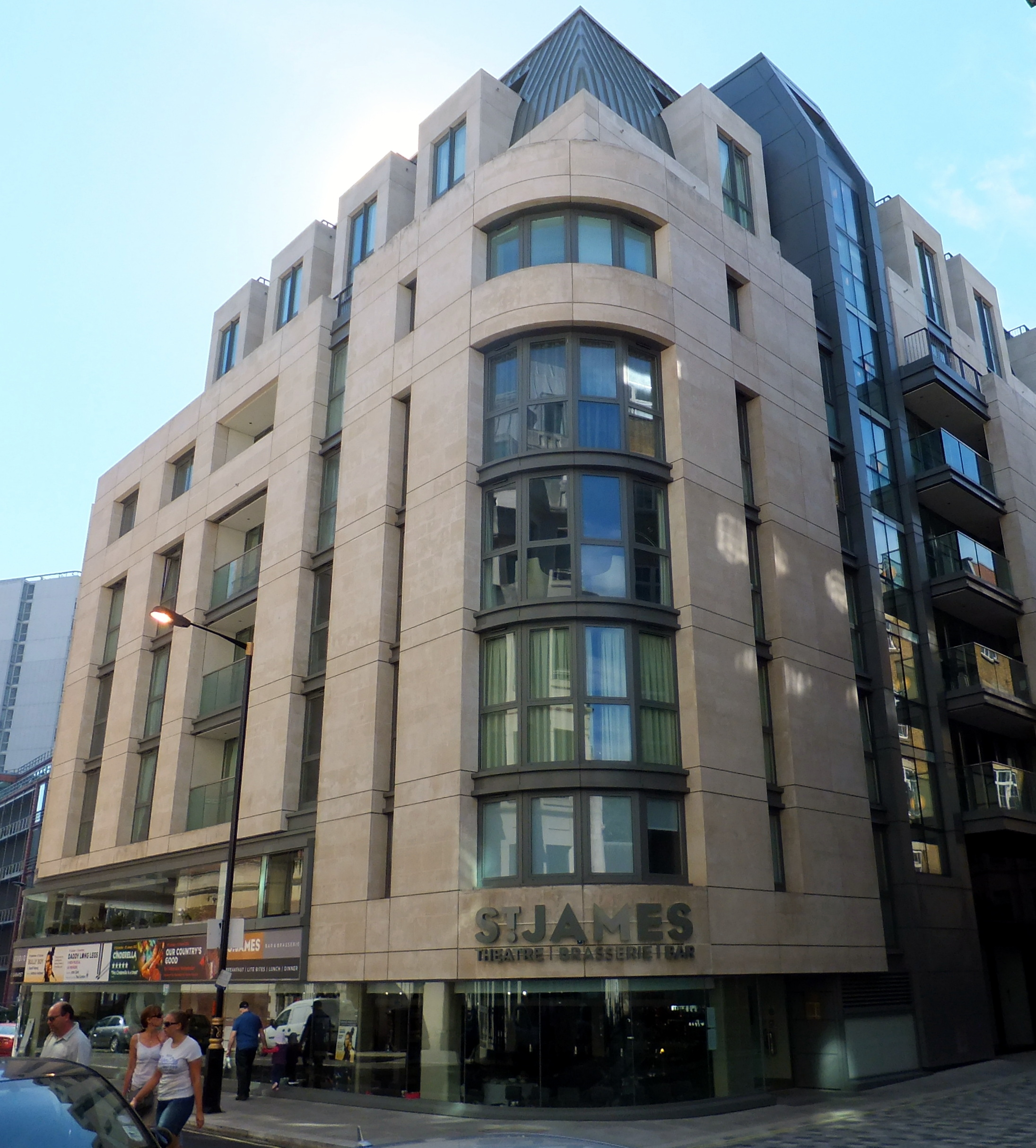
- The building in 2012, as St James Theatre
- Interactive map of The Other Palace
- Address: Palace Street; London, SW1; United Kingdom
- Coordinates: 51.49857°N 0.14091°W
- Operator: Bill Kenwright
- Capacity: Main stage: 312; Studio theatre: 120
- Type: Off West End theatre
- Public transit: Victoria

Construction
- Opened: 18 September 2012; 13 years ago
- Architect: Foster Wilson Architects

Website
- www.theotherpalace.co.uk

The Other Palace is a theatre in London's Off West End which opened on 18 September 2012 as the St. James Theatre. It features a 312-seat main theatre and a 120-seat studio theatre. It was built on the site of the former Westminster Theatre, which was damaged by a fire in 2002 and subsequently demolished. It was owned by Andrew Lloyd Webber's Really Useful Theatres Group from 2016 to 2021, which gave it its current name.

== History ==
Described as "the first newly built theatre complex in central London for 30 years", the building was designed by Foster Wilson Architects. The theatre began its debut season in September 2012 with the London premiere of Sandi Toksvig's Bully Boy.

After its acquisition by Really Useful Theatres Group, Paul Taylor Mills was appointed as the new artistic director, with a programme intended to develop new musicals. The name change became official in February 2017. In June 2018, Chris Harper stepped into the role of Director of Programming.

In May 2021, Lloyd Webber announced he was putting the theatre up for sale, calling the decision "heart-wrenching" and adding that he hoped "the future owners will love it as much as I have."

In October 2021, it was announced the theatre had been sold to Bill Kenwright. Kenwright had previously produced musicals including Heathers and Be More Chill at The Other Palace.

== Notable productions ==
- La Strada – London transfer following UK tour, directed by Sally Cookson, starring Audrey Brisson
- The Last Five Years (2016) – starring Jonathan Bailey and Samantha Barks
- The Wild Party (2017) – starring Frances Ruffelle and John Owen-Jones
- Big Fish (2017) – UK premiere starring Kelsey Grammer, directed by Nigel Harman
- Eugenius! (2018) – World premiere (following concert at London Palladium in 2016)
- Heathers The Musical (2018 – 2023) – UK premiere (following workshop in the studio in 2017) before transferring to the Theatre Royal Haymarket, starring Carrie Hope Fletcher
- The Messiah (2018) – London transfer following UK tour, written and directed by Patrick Barlow, starring Hugh Dennis, Martin Marquez and Lesley Garrett
- Falsettos (2019) – UK premiere starring Daniel Boys, Joel Montague, Laura Pitt-Pulford, Oliver Savile. Natasha J Barnes, Gemma Knight-Jones
- Amélie (2019) – UK premiere (London transfer following UK tour), starring Audrey Brisson
- Be More Chill (2020) – UK premiere (cut short due to COVID-19 pandemic)
- Cruel Intentions: The '90s Musical (2024) – UK premiere
- The Lightning Thief: The Percy Jackson Musical (2024) – UK premiere
- 50 First Dates: The Musical (2025) – World premiere
