= Ann Treneman =

American journalist in the United Kingdom

Ann Treneman (born 1956) is an American journalist, currently working for The Times newspaper in the United Kingdom.

Treneman was born in Iowa City, Iowa, but she grew up in McMinnville, Oregon. She has lived in the UK since the mid-1980s.

== Career in journalism ==
Until September 2015, she was The Times Parliamentary sketchwriter. In this role, her tone was pawky, frequently reducing the serious business of politics to playground spats between bickering children. Another leitmotif is the humorous written portrayal of politicians as ridiculous caricatures, in the style of a modern-day William Hogarth cartoon. A further ploy is the use of anthropomorphism to further heighten the surreal atmosphere of the House of Commons. Total Politics has referred to Treneman as "one of the sharpest wits in Westminster".

In 2015, she became the chief theatre critic for The Times. She made her debut with a one-star review of the musical Dusty at the Charing Cross Theatre.

== Personal life ==
Ann lived in Derbyshire, but has recently relocated to Kent.

== Books ==
Her first two books, Annus Horribilis: The Worst Year in British Politics, (2009) and Dave and Nick: The Year of the Honeymoon (2011) were collections of her Parliamentary sketch pieces and refer to the Conservative Party.

In October 2013 she published her third book, Finding the Plot: 100 Graves to Visit Before You Die. It arose from her interest in researching the last resting places of significant characters from history; she has said that "London cemeteries have the most interesting people and that north London has more interesting dead people per square mile than anywhere in the world".
