= Joel Horwood =

British playwright

Joel Horwood is a British playwright. He has been a member of the Royal Court/BBC 50 scheme and has also been on attachment at Hampstead Theatre.

His plays include I Caught Crabs in Walberswick, Mikey the Pikey, Food, and I Heart Peterborough, all of which have been presented on the Edinburgh Fringe. Is Everyone OK? toured England and played in Croatia in October 2010. He was one of the four writers who adapted Radiohead's OK Computer for BBC Radio 4. His adaptation of The Count of Monte Cristo played at West Yorkshire Playhouse in May 2010. Horwood also took part in the Old Vic New Voices 24 Hour Plays in 2006 and the celebrity version of the same event in 2009.

His play All The Little Things We Crushed was produced in 2009 at the Almeida Theatre in London directed by Simon Godwin. The cast included; Zawe Ashton, Richard Bremmer, Louise Ford, Andrew Hawley, Martina Laird and David Oakes.

Following his work writing for 'Skins', Horwood was commissioned to work on an original series idea for Channel 4.

He wrote the stage adaptation of The Ocean at the End of the Lane based on the novel by Neil Gaiman for the National Theatre, London which opened in December 2019.
