= Club Montepulciano =

Former cabaret night in London

Club Montepulciano (shortened to Club M) was a lounge and cabaret club-night that ran themed events across a number of venues in London, with guest appearances in the South of England and across Europe, from 1993 to 2004. Founded by compere Heilco Van Der Pleog and DJ Nick Hollywood, it was variously described as a "clubland institution" by Time Out and "the future of clubbing" by The Independent. It acted as a launch pad for new talent and influenced the then emerging cabaret and burlesque scenes.

As a musical event, Club Montepulciano was founded on swinging cocktail tunes from nightclubs and ballrooms of a bygone era. Its themed nights had different retro vibes, influenced by icons Breakfast at Tiffany's, James Bond or the Playboy Clubs of the 1950s and 1960s, with clubbers dressing in the style of each event.

== Venues ==
The club started at The Water Rats, before relocating to the Rivoli Ballroom in 1994, where it ran monthly until 2002.

Other venues used by Club Montepulciano included the Hanover Grand, Café de Paris, the Connaught Ballrooms, Turnmills, the Kensington Roof Gardens, Brockwell Lido, the Embassy Club, Glastonbury Festival, Glyndebourne, Pacha's flagship venue in Madrid, Dingwalls, Eastborne Wintergardens, the original Brighton Concord, Madame Jojo's, the Scala club at Kings Cross, the Eve Club, the Blackheath Halls, and The Camden Centre.

== Acts ==
Club Montepulciano's cabaret and comedy acts included an early appearance by The League of Gentlemen, Mackenzie Crook as Charlie Cheese, Jackie Clune as Karen Carpenter, Matt Lucas and David Walliams, Amy Lamé in collaboration with 'Duckie', Ursula Martinez, The Tiger Lillies, Men in Coats, Mike Flowers Pops, The Lorraine Bowen Experience, Percy and Allen, Tina C and Dr Stuart, and the UK Latin American Ballroom Dance Champions.

Complementing these performers were circus acts, magicians, impersonators and more built around a variety style bill. Club Montepulciano also hosted its own in-house casino, talk-a-oke, the Flirtation Tank and Minuscule of Sound, as well as the in-house band Montepulciano.

Club Montepulciano was described as one of the "things you have to do before you're a real Londoner" by Time Out magazine in 2004. The demand for its music grew into Club Montepulciano Recordings and subsequently Freshly Squeezed Music.

== In popular culture ==
The band Hooverphonic recorded a song called "Club Montepulciano". It was inspired by a visit to the club (then resident at Dingwalls) while the band were recording their debut album for Sony in a nearby studio. When their album was later launched, it was done so at a private version of Club Montepulciano at Dingwalls in Camden.
