= Sally Cookson =

British theatre director

- Occupation: Theatre director

Sally Cookson is a British theatre director, known for her devised adaptations of literary works, in particular, A Monster Calls (2018) and Jane Eyre (2014).

== Early life and education ==
Cookson attended the London Academy of Music and Dramatic Art (LAMDA).

== Career ==
Cookson began her career as an actor. Her first professional show as a director was Cloudland, a production for early years staged with Travelling Light in 2003.

=== Directing credits ===
- David Copperfield: A Life (2026) - Theatre Royal Bath.
- Wonder Boy (2024) – Bristol Old Vic
- Dracula: Mina's Reckoning (2023) – National Theatre of Scotland
- Birthmarked (2023) – Bristol Old Vic
- Emilia – Bristol Old Vic Theatre School
- Wonder Boy (2022) – Bristol Old Vic
- Peter Pan (2019) – Royal National Theatre/Bristol Old Vic
- A Monster Calls (2018) – The Old Vic
- Boing! (2018) – Travelling Light Theatre Company
- The Lion, The Witch, and The Wardrobe (2017) – West Yorkshire Playhouse
- La Strada (2017) – The Other Place
- Peter Pan (2016) – Royal National Theatre
- Hetty Feather (2016) – Rose Theatre Kingston
- Jane Eyre (2015) – Royal National Theatre
- Sleeping Beauty (2015) – Bristol Old Vic
- Jane Eyre (2014) – Bristol Old Vic
- The Boy Who Cried Wolf (2013) – Bristol Old Vic
- We're Going on a Bear Hunt (2013)
- Hetty Feather (2014) – Duke of York's Theatre/Vaudeville Theatre
- Peter Pan (2012) – Bristol Old Vic
- Cinderella: A Fairy Tale (2011) – Tobacco Factory Theatre
- Cloudland (2003) – Travelling Light Theatre Company

== Awards and nominations ==
Year	Award	Work	Result	Notes	Ref.
2019	Laurence Olivier Award for Best Family Show	A Monster Calls	Won	devised by the company	
2017	Laurence Olivier Award for Best Family Show	Peter Pan	Nominated	devised by the company	
2015	Laurence Olivier Award for Best Family Show	Hetty Feather	Nominated		
2013	Laurence Olivier Award for Best Family Show	Cinderella: A Fairy Tale	Nominated		
