= List of theatre directors in the 20th and 21st centuries =

This is a list of theatre directors, living and dead, who have been active in the 20th and 21st centuries.

== Arabic speaking ==
- Fouad Awad
- Mohammed Al Shanfari

== Belarusian speaking ==
- Ihnat Bujnicki
- Mikalai Khalezin

== Bengali speaking ==
- Montazur Rahman Akbar
- Debesh Chattopadhyay
- Utpal Dutta
- Goutam Halder
- Manoj Mitra
- Shambhu Mitra
- Natyaguru Nurul Momen
- Mamunur Rashid
- Badal Sarkar
- Bratya Basu

== Chinese speaking ==
- Jiao Juyin
- Li Liuyi
- Wang Chong

== English speaking ==
- George Abbott
- Maria Aitken
- JoAnne Akalaitis
- Franco Ambriz
- Threes Anna
- Libby Appel
- Steven Atkinson
- Lucy Bailey
- Dominic Barber
- Neil Bartlett
- John Barton
- Emjo Basshe
- Julian Beck
- Paul Berman
- David Berthold
- Etel Billig
- Carla Blank
- Anne Bogart
- Lee Breuer
- Yvonne Brewster
- Mark Brokaw
- Peter Brook
- Robert Brustein
- Hazel Joan Bryant
- Betty Burstall
- Simon Callow
- Annie Castledine
- Joseph Chaikin
- Rachel Chavkin
- Ping Chong
- Harold Clurman
- Victor Correia
- Edward Gordon Craig
- James Dacre
- Maude Davey
- Howard Davies
- Ian Dickens
- Marcia Milgrom Dodge
- Declan Donnellan
- Mehmet Ergen
- Gale Edwards
- Tim Etchells
- Joel Fink
- Richard Foreman
- Bob Fosse
- Bob Frith
- Frank Galati
- Patrick Garland
- Joel Gersmann
- John Gielgud
- Katie Mitchell
- Andre Gregory
- Tyrone Guthrie
- Peter Hall
- Marcia Haufrecht
- Jeremy Herrin
- Jack Hofsiss
- Michael Howard
- Sophie Hunter
- John Jesurun
- Rhodessa Jones
- Michael Kahn
- Robert Kalfin
- Helena Kaut-Howson
- Elia Kazan
- Patrick Kinmonth
- Jim Knipple
- Jan Kott
- Wayne Lamb
- Tina Landau
- Helen Langworthy (1899–1991)
- James Lapine
- Charles Laughton
- Eddie Lawrence
- Walter Learning
- Elizabeth LeCompte
- Robert Lepage
- Robert Lewis
- Tom Littler
- Joan Littlewood
- Clare Lizzimore
- Jamie Lloyd
- Phyllida Lloyd
- Joshua Logan
- Sidney Lumet
- Rosie Malek-Yonan
- Judith Malina
- Joe Mantello
- Kathleen Marshall
- Rob Marshall
- Jackie Maxwell
- Richard Maxwell
- Michael Mayer
- Brad Mays
- Des McAnuff
- Simon McBurney
- Guthrie McClintic
- Sam Mendes
- Greta Mendez
- Jorge Merced
- Worthington Miner
- Neil Munro
- Stephen Murphy
- Christopher Newton
- Mike Nichols
- Trevor Nunn
- Laurence Olivier
- Diane Paulus
- Ralph Pena
- Robin Phillips
- Steven Pimlott
- Harold Prince
- José Quintero
- Agustin Reyes
- Lloyd Richards
- Martin Ritt
- Mark Rylance
- Kate Saxon
- Franklin Schaffner
- Richard Schechner
- Jay Scheib
- Erica Schmidt
- Peter Schumann
- Michael Scott
- Peter Sellars
- Andrei Şerban
- Stephen Shank
- Eve Shapiro
- Nathaniel Shaw
- Hassard Short
- Leigh Silverman
- Jeanmarie Simpson
- Max Stafford-Clark
- Susan Stroman
- Rebecca Taichman
- Julie Taymor
- Tazewell Thompson
- Sidney Toler
- Darko Tresnjak
- Russell Treyz
- Craig Walker
- Sam Wanamaker
- Matthew Warchus
- Douglas Turner Ward
- Deborah Warner
- David Warren
- Orson Welles
- James Whale
- Bart Whiteman
- Kate Whoriskey
- Kip Williams
- Robert Wilson
- Lee Wochner
- George C. Wolfe
- Robert Woodruff
- Mary Zimmerman

== Filipino speaking ==
- Daisy Avellana
- Lamberto V. Avellana
- Joel Lamangan
- Menchu Lauchengco-Yulo
- Severino Montano
- Mario O'Hara
- Ralph Pena
- Freddie Santos
- Rolando Tinio

== French speaking ==
- Jean Anouilh
- André Antoine
- Antonin Artaud
- Jean Louis Barrault
- Gaston Baty
- Patrice Chéreau
- Jean Cocteau
- Armand Eloi
- Jean Giraudoux
- Louis Jouvet
- Jorge Lavelli
- Robert Lepage
- Lugné-Poe
- Ariane Mnouchkine
- Jeanne Moreau
- Roger Planchon
- Jacques Rivette
- Jerome Savary
- Stephen Shank
- Jean Vilar

== German speaking ==
- Ruth Berghaus
- Benno Besson
- Bertolt Brecht
- Hans Bunge
- Frank Castorf
- Dieter Dorn
- Erich Engel
- August Everding
- Walter Felsenstein
- Gotz Friedrich
- Jens-Daniel Herzog
- Leopold Jessner
- Fritz Kortner
- Harry Kupfer
- Martin Kušej (bilingual German/Slovenian)
- Corny Littmann
- Peter Lund
- Thomas Ostermeier
- Peter Palitzsch
- Claus Peymann
- Erwin Piscator
- Max Reinhardt
- Einar Schleef
- Peter Stein
- Karl Heinz Stroux
- Heinz Tietjen
- Nike Wagner
- Wieland Wagner
- Wolfgang Wagner
- Peter Zadek

== Hindi speaking ==
- Ebrahim Alkazi
- Shamim Azad
- Ram Gopal Bajaj
- Manish Joshi Bismil
- Satyadev Dubey
- Arvind Gaur
- Bharatendu Harishchandra
- Safdar Hashmi
- Rohini Hattangadi
- Prithviraj Kapoor
- B.V. Karanth
- Mohan Maharishi
- Prasanna
- B.M. Shah
- Om Shivpuri
- Habib Tanvir
- Ratan Thiyam
- Bansi Kaul

== Italian speaking ==
- Giorgio Albertazzi
- Eugenio Barba
- Orazio Costa
- Eduardo De Filippo
- Dario Fo
- Paolo Grassi
- Glauco Mauri
- Renzo Ricci
- Luca Ronconi
- Guido Salvini
- Maurizio Scaparro
- Luigi Squarzina
- Giorgio Strehler
- Aldo Trionfo
- Luchino Visconti
- Franco Zeffirelli

== Lithuanian speaking ==
- Dalia Ibelhauptaitė
- Oskaras Koršunovas
- Eimuntas Nekrošius
- Juozas Miltinis
- Rimas Tuminas
- Jonas Vaitkus
- Adolfas Večerskis

== Nepali speaking ==
- Anup Baral
- Hari Prasad Rimal
- Khagendra Lamichhane
- Sunil Pokharel

== Norwegian speaking ==
- Liv Ullmann
- Tore Vagn Lid
- Stein Winge

== Persian speaking ==
- Bahram Beyzai
- Hamid Samandarian
- Ali Nassirian

== Polish speaking ==
- Erwin Axer
- Richard Boleslavsky
- Kazimierz Dejmek
- Jerzy Fedorowicz
- Jerzy Grotowski
- Adam Hanuszkiewicz
- Stefan Jaracz
- Krzysztof Jasiński
- Tadeusz Kantor
- Jarosław Kilian
- Jerzy Markuszewski
- Stanisława Perzanowska
- Barbara Sass
- Leon Schiller
- Ludwik Solski
- Włodzimierz Staniewski
- Józef Szajna
- Arnold Szyfman
- Mariusz Treliński
- Andrzej Wajda
- Michał Zadara
- Lidia Zamkow
- Krzysztof Zanussi
- Zbigniew Zapasiewicz
- Aleksander Zelwerowicz
- Feliks Żukowski

== Portuguese speaking ==
- Augusto Boal
- Sergio Britto
- Luis Miguel Cintra
- João Garcia Miguel
- Jorge Listopad
- Arlindo Lopes
- Gerald Thomas

== Romanian speaking ==
- Alexandru Arșinel
- Zaharia Bârsan
- Radu Beligan
- Ion Besoiu
- Toma Caragiu
- Ion Caramitru
- Alexandru Dabija
- Radu Gyr
- Ion Minulescu
- Maia Morgenstern
- Vlad Mugur
- Amza Pellea
- Elvira Popescu
- Vlad Rădescu
- Victor Rebengiuc
- Mihail Sadoveanu
- Zaharia Stancu
- Silviu Stănculescu
- Lucia Sturdza-Bulandra
- Andrei Șerban
- Gábor Tompa
- Dorel Vișan
- George Vraca
- George Mihail Zamfirescu

== Russian speaking ==
- Nikolay Akimov
- Yevgeny Aryeh
- Yuri Butusov
- Vladimir Nemirovich-Danchenko
- Lev Dodin
- Anatoly Efros
- Kama Ginkas
- Yuri Lyubimov
- Alexandre Marine
- Vsevolod Meyerhold
- Vladimir Nemirovich-Danchenko
- Nikolai Okhlopkov
- Lev Shekhtman
- Konstantin Stanislavsky
- Alexander Tairov
- Georgy Tovstonogov
- Yevgeny Vakhtangov
- Anatoly Vasiliev
- Vladimir Mikhailovich Zakharov
- Yury Zavadsky

== Serbo-Croatian speaking ==
- Nebojša Bradić
- Goran Gajić
- Branko Gavella
- Gradimir Gojer
- Zorica Jevremović
- Siniša Kovačević
- Sulejman Kupusović
- Velimir Živojinović Massuka
- Dejan Miladinović
- Ognjenka Milićević
- Branislav Nušić
- Vida Ognjenović
- Tanja Miletić Oručević
- Haris Pašović
- Katja Restović
- Zijah Sokolović
- Mira Trailović
- Mirjana Vukomanović
- Milenko Zablaćanski
- Stevo Žigon

== Spanish speaking ==
- Calixto Bieito
- Alejandra Boero
- Antonio Cunill Cabanellas
- Orestes Caviglia
- Armando Discépolo
- Nuria Espert
- Carlos Gandolfo
- Victor Garcia
- Juan Carlos Gené
- Antonio Larreta
- Inda Ledesma
- Cecilio Madanes
- Jorge Merced
- Fanny Mikey
- José Quintero
- Jesusa Rodríguez
- José Tamayo
- Margarita Xirgu
- China Zorrilla

== Slovak speaking ==
- Juraj Nvota
- Roman Polák

== Swedish speaking ==
- Lars Amble
- Ingmar Bergman
- Hugo Hansén
- Olof Molander
- Stig Olin
- Peter Oskarson
- Albert Ranft
- Alf Sjöberg

== Multilingual ==
- Fouad Awad (Arabic, Hebrew, English)
- Lucien Bourjeily (Arabic, French, English)
- Chandradasan (English, Kannada, Malayalam, Sanskrit, Tamil)
- Mario Kovač (Croatian, English, Italian)
- Roberto Paci Dalò (English, Italian, German, French, Chinese)
- Stephen Shank (English, French)
- Mihai Timofti (English, French, Italian, Romanian, Russia)
- Rajesh Vedprakash (English, Hindi, Punjabi, Urdu)

== Malayalam speaking ==
- Stancho Stanchev (Bulgarian)
