= When You See Millions of the Mouthless Dead =

World War I poetry

- by Charles Sorley
- First published in: 1916
- Language: English

When you see millions of the mouthless dead
Across your dreams in pale battalions go,
Say not soft things as other men have said,
That you'll remember. For you need not so.
Give them not praise. For, deaf, how should they know
It is not curses heaped on each gashed head?
Nor tears. Their blind eyes see not your tears flow.
Nor honour. It is easy to be dead.
Say only this, “They are dead.” Then add thereto,
“Yet many a better one has died before.”
Then, scanning all the o'ercrowded mass, should you
Perceive one face that you loved heretofore,
It is a spook. None wears the face you knew.
Great death has made all his for evermore.

"When You See Millions of the Mouthless Dead", also known as "The Army of Death", "The Dead", or "A Sonnet", is a poem by Charles Sorley, a British Army officer and Scottish war poet who fought in the First World War. At age 20, Sorley was killed in action near Hulluch, having been shot in the head by a sniper during the final offensive of the Battle of Loos on 13 October 1915. This, Sorley's last poem, was recovered from his kit after his death. It was untitled, and so is commonly known by its incipit, or other titles.

It is generally interpreted as a rebuttal to Rupert Brooke's 1915 sonnet "The Soldier.", which begins "If I should die, think only this of me: / That there's some corner of a foreign field / That is for ever England."

== Legacy ==
It Is Easy To Be Dead by Neil McPherson, a play on Sorley's life, based on his poetry and letters, was presented at the Finborough Theatre, London, and subsequently at Trafalgar Studios, London, in 2016 where it was nominated for an Olivier Award. It subsequently toured to Glasgow and Sorley's birthplace, Aberdeen, in 2018.

On 9 November 2018, an opinion commentary by Aaron Schnoor published in The Wall Street Journal honored the poetry of World War I, including Sorley's poem "When You See Millions of the Mouthless Dead".
