= Steven Atkinson =

English stage, film producer (b. 1984)

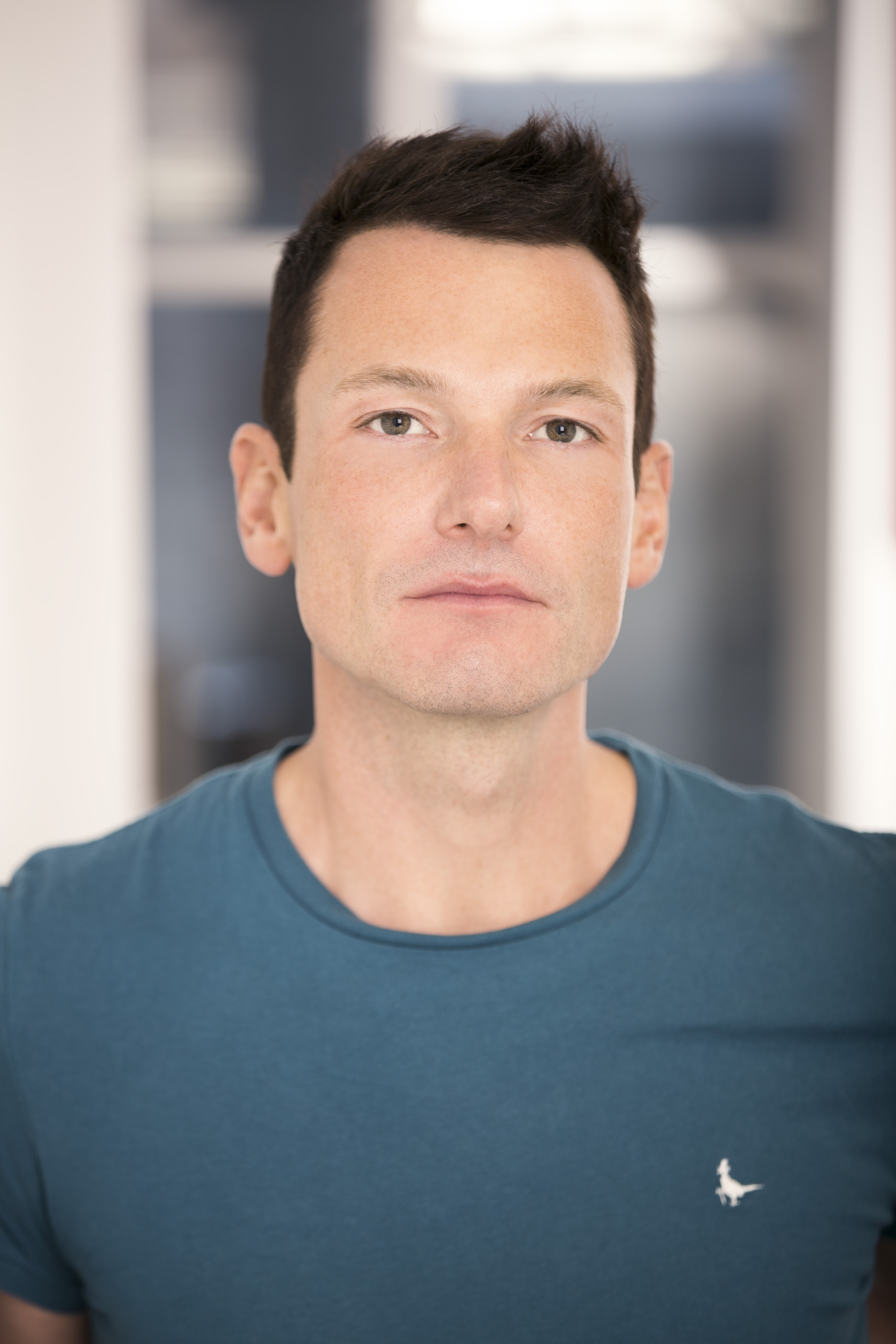
- Steven Atkinson
- Born: Steven Atkinson; 4 May 1984 (age 42); Liverpool, Merseyside, England
- Education: University of Reading
- Occupations: Theatre producer, film producer
- Years active: 2005–present

Steven Atkinson (born 4 May 1984) is a British producer working in theatre and film.

He co-founded and led HighTide, one of the UK's theatre companies, as well as the National Portfolio Organisation of Arts Council England. Atkinson has commissioned and produced more than 80 new plays in theatres, including the National Theatre, The Old Vic, Royal Court Theatre, Young Vic, and Off-Broadway. In addition, he has produced at least 14 HighTide festivals in Suffolk and London.

== Education ==
Atkinson graduated from the University of Reading in 2005 with a B.A. in Film & Theatre.

== Career ==
=== Early career ===
Atkinson's career first started in script development working at the Donmar Warehouse under Michael Grandage. He worked in the Royal Court under Ian Rickson and Hull Truck Theatre under John Godber. Atkinson produced Hull Truck's first new writing festival in 2007.

=== HighTide ===
In 2007, Atkinson co-founded and became artistic director of HighTide, quickly establishing the theatre company as one of the leading production firms in the UK.

"Under artistic director Steven Atkinson, the festival – a tempting mixture of new productions, readings and discussions - has grown to become one of the little gems of the artistic calendar in Britain. And, with alumni such as Ella Hickson and Nick Payne poached in the past for shows at the National Theatre in London and the Public Theatre in New York, it has become a real hunting-ground for new talent".

In Atkinson's opening season at HighTide, he produced Adam Brace's Stovepipe. The production was then transferred from the HighTide Festival to London through the National Theatre and Bush Theatre, where it was critically acclaimed. The Sunday Times praised Atkinson's Stovepipe as "a five-star production in its power and ambition", while The Independent called it "exhilaratingly convincing." The production was ranked in The Sunday Times Best Theatre Productions of the Decade as well as nominated for Best Off-West End Production in the Whatsonstage awards. In the same season, Atkinson also produced Joel Horwood's I Caught Crabs in Walberswick, which transferred to the Bush Theatre. He also produced Switzerland, the first play by Nick Payne who then went on to win the George Devine Award.

At HighTide, Atkinson produced and championed many of the leading new writers of the last decade, including Anders Lustgarten, Luke Barnes, Tallulah Brown, E V Crowe, Elinor Cook, Rob Drummond, Kenny Emson, Kieran Hurley, Theresa Ikoko, Branden Jacobs-Jenkins, Ella Hickson, Eve Leigh, Vinay Patel, Nick Payne, Beth Steel, Al Smith, Sam Steiner, and Jack Thorne.

In 2016, Atkinson gave an interview to The Stage where he spoke of his ambitions for HighTide Festival: 'We want to be theatre's Sundance.'

Atkinson has been awarded twice for the Emerging Producers Bursary by the Society of London Theatre for his work on Stovepipe and Lidless. In 2009, he received another award by Esquire magazine as one of the 60 Brilliant Brits Shaping 2009.

In 2019, Atkinson stepped down from HighTide after twelve years to pursue new opportunities.

== London Theatre credits ==
Bush Theatre

- I Caught Crabs in Walberswick by Joel Horwood, directed by Lucy Kerbel (2008)
- Mudlarks by Vickie Donoghue, directed by Will Wrightson (2012)
- Moth by Declan Greene, directed by Prasanna Puwanarajah (2013)
- True Brits by Vinay Patel, directed by Tanith Lindon (2014)
- Incognito by Nick Payne, directed by Joe Murphy (2014)
- Forget Me Not by Tom Holloway, directed by Steven Atkinson (2015)
- Rust by Kenny Emson, directed by Eleanor Rhode (2019)
- The Trick by Eve Leigh, directed by Roy Alexander Weisse (2019)
- Collapsible by Margaret Perry, directed by Thomas Martin (2020)

Young Vic

- See Me Now by Molly Taylor, directed by Mimi Poskitt (2017)

Royal Court Theatre

- Harrogate by Al Smith, directed by Richard Twyman (2016)

Soho Theatre

- Boys by Ella Hickson, directed by Robert Icke (2012)
- Pastoral by Thomas Eccleshare, directed by Steve Marmion (2013)
- Bottleneck by Luke Barnes, directed by Steven Atkinson (2013)
- Smallholding by Chris Dunkley, directed by Patrick Sandford (2014)
- Lampedusa by Anders Lustgarten, directed by Steven Atkinson (2015)
- Girls by Theresa Ikoko, directed by Elyace Ismail (2017)

Royal National Theatre

- Stovepipe by Adam Brace, directed by Michael Longhurst (2009)

Old Vic Theatre

- Ditch by Beth Steel, directed by Richard Twyman (2010)

Trafalgar Studios

- Lidless by Frances Ya-Chu Cowhig, directed by Steven Atkinson (2011)

The Yard Theatre

- BRENDA by E V. Crowe, directed by Caitlin McLeod (2015)
- Pilgrims by Elinor Cook, directed by Tamara Harvey (2016)

Arcola Theatre

- Peddling by Harry Melling, directed by Steven Atkinson (2014)
- The Sugar Coated Bullets of the Bourgeoisie by Anders Lustgarten, directed by Steven Atkinson (2016)

Gate Theatre

- Pink Lemonade by Mika Johnson, directed by Emily Aboud (2019)
- Since U Been Gone by Teddy Lamb, directed by Billy Barrett (2019)

== Regional Theatre credits ==
Live Theatre

- Pops by Charlotte Josephine, directed by Ali Pidsley (2019)

Nottingham Playhouse

- LIT by Sophie Ellerby, directed by Stef O’Driscoll (2019)

Nuffield Theatre

- Neighbours by Branden Jacobs-Jenkins, directed by Steven Atkinson (2013)

Paines Plough

- Chicken by Molly Davies, directed by Steven Atkinson (2015)

Royal Exchange Theatre

- So Here We Are by Luke Norris, directed by Steven Atkinson (2015)

Sheffield Crucible

- Stuart: A Life Backwards by Jack Thorne, directed by Mark Rosenblatt (2013)

Theatr Clwyd

- Pilgrims by Elinor Cook, directed by Tamara Harvey (2016)
- Heroine by Nessah Muthy, directed by Steven Atkinson (2017)

Traverse Theatre

- In Fidelity by Rob Drummond, directed by Steven Atkinson (2016)
- Mouthpiece by Kieran Hurley, directed by Orla O’Loughlin (2018)

Ustinov Studio Theatre Royal Bath

- The Big Meal by Dan LeFranc, directed by Michael Boyd (2014)

Watford Palace Theatre

- Dusk Rings A Bell by Stephen Belber, directed by Steven Atkinson (2012)

== Off-Broadway Theatre credits ==
=== 59E59 Theaters ===
- Peddling by Harry Melling, directed by Steven Atkinson (2014) NYT Critics' Pick

=== The Public Theater ===
- The Agony and the Ecstasy of Steve Jobs by Mike Daisy, directed by Jean-Michelle Gregory (2012)

== Radio credits ==
=== BBC Radio 4 ===
- The Afghan and The Penguin by Michael Hastings, directed by Steven Atkinson (2012)
- The Shores by Vinay Patel, directed by Jessica Dromgoole (2019)
- Silver Darlings by Tallulah Brown, directed by Jessica Dromgoole (2019)

=== The Guardian ===
- Lampedusa by Anders Lustgarten, directed by Steven Atkinson (2015)

== Awards and nominations ==
Year	Award	Stage Play	Result
2009	Society of London Theatre New Producers' Award	Stovepipe	Won
2009	Whatsonstage Award for Best Off West End Production	Stovepipe	Nominated
2010	Fringe First Award	Lidless	Won
2011	Society of London Theatre New Producers' Award	Lidless	Won
2012	Fringe First Award	Educating Ronnie	Won
2016	Manchester Evening News Awards Best Production	So Here We Are	Won
2016	Manchester Evening News Awards Best Play	So Here We Are	Won
2017	Evening Standard Theatre Awards Charles Wintour Award for Most Promising Playwright	Harrogate	Nominated
