= Julia Pascal =

British playwright and theatre director

Julia Pascal is a British playwright and theatre director.

== Biography ==
Pascal was a NESTA Dreamtime Fellow in 2006 and Writer in Residence at the Wiener Library in 2007 with a Leverhulme Grant. Her archive is held by the University of York where she was Writer in Residence in 2003. Her journalism has been published in The Guardian, The Observer.The Independent, the Financial Times and The Times.

In 2016, Pascal received her PhD from York University's Theatre, Film and Television Department. King's College London awarded her a Research Fellowship in 2017. She is an Associate Research Fellow in the School of Arts at Birkbeck University of London and a Visiting Lecturer at City, University of London on the MA Theatre Writing course. She teaches theatre at St. Lawrence University's London Study Abroad Program. In 2019-2020 she was Writer in Residence at Dyspla.

== Plays ==
A Jewish atheist, Pascal's stage plays include three grouped together as The Holocaust Trilogy. The first of these is Theresa, based on historical accounts of a Jewish woman in Guernsey during the German occupation in the Second World War. Original music for the play was composed by Kyla Greenbaum. It is followed by A Dead Woman on Holiday, which is set during the Nuremberg Trials, followed by her adaptation of Solomon Anski's The Dybbuk. Crossing Jerusalem is about the conflict in the Middle East. The Golem is a version of the Prague myth of the Golem for young audiences. St Joan is a satire based on a Jewish Black Londoner who dreams she is Joan of Arc. Year Zero reveals World War II stories from Vichy France. In 2007, her adaptation of The Merchant of Venice was staged at the Arcola Theatre and printed as The Shylock Play in 2009. Her autobiographical essay "Prima Ballerina Assoluta" appeared in a Virago Press collection Truth, Dare or Promise. Her other plays include The Yiddish Queen Lear and Woman In The Moon. Oberon Press publishes the texts of her plays.

The Dybbuk premiered in London at the New End Theatre, Hampstead, in July 1992, then the Lilian Baylis Theatre. Since 1992 it has played in Munich at the Festival of Jewish Theatre, at Maubeuge's International Theatre Festival, in Poland (British Council tour), Sweden, Belgium and on a British regional tour. The Dybbuk had its US premiere at Theater for the New City in New York City in August 2010. The Wedding Party (known as Bloody Wedding) was premiered at the Ohrid Festival 2012, Macedonia, and was performed at the Actor's Centre, London, in 2013.

Her play Nineveh was produced by Theatre Témoin at Riverside Studios in 2013. St Joan was produced at the Edinburgh Festival in August 2014 at the Bedlam Theatre.

Pascal's play Crossing Jerusalem became the centre of controversy in early 2016 when the Michael-Ann Russell Jewish Community Center's Cultural Arts Theatre in North Miami-Dade cut short the play's schedule, bending to members of the Jewish community who found the play to be critical of Israel. The Miami Herald said the incident "has left raw feelings among those who call the cancellation a capitulation to politics and those who say the play was deeply and needlessly hurtful". Pascal protested that “the intent of the play was to show the complexity of Israeli life”, and called the early closure "censorship." Forward magazine commented: "The controversy mirrors others faced by American JCCs over media perceived to be critical of Israel, notably in Washington and New York". Crossing Jerusalem was produced at the Karlsruhe Staatstheater as Mittendurch Jerusalem, translated by Thomas Huber.

Pascal's television drama documentary for the BBC, Charlotte and Jane, won awards from BAFTA and the Royal Television Society.

In 2019 her play inspired by Kurdish women soldiers, Blueprint Medea, premiered at The Finborough Theatre, London. At the same theatre her play about Irish and Jewish nationalism, 12-37, premiered in 2022. Her semi-staged reading of As Happy As God In France was seen at Burgh House, Hampstead for Holocaust Memorial Day 2023. A Manchester Girlhood premiered at the Old Electric Theatre, Blackpool, and Manchester Jewish Museum in 2023. Site specific plays Dancing, Talking Taboo! were performed at the Bloomsbury Festival 2021. In 2022 the Festival presented her Dancing, Trailblazing Taboo, about the life of Eleanor Marx.

== See also ==
- List of atheists in film, radio, television and theatre
- List of English speaking theatre directors in the 20th and 21st centuries
