= Charles Sorley =

British poet (1895–1915)

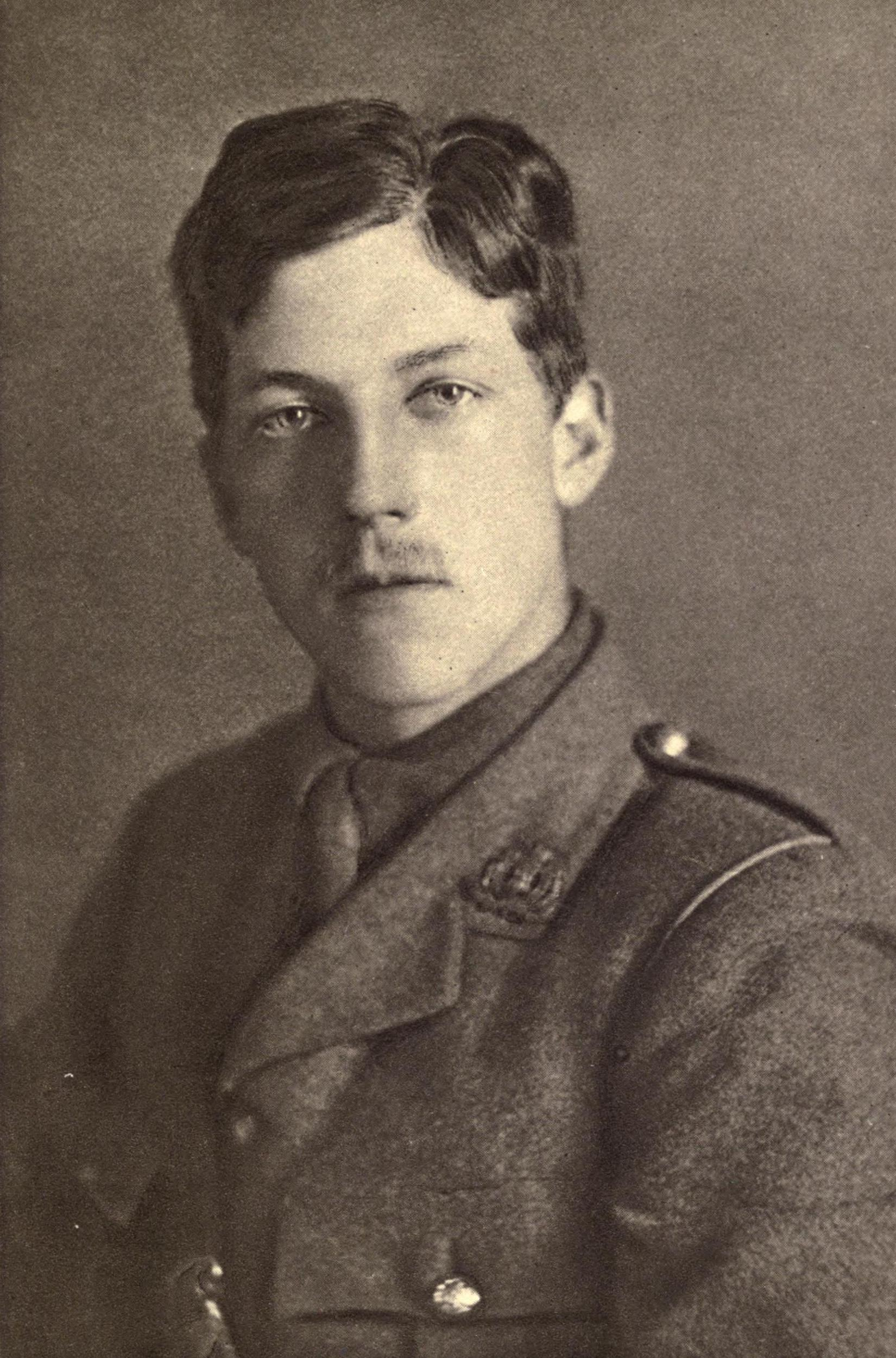
- Born: Charles Hamilton Sorley; 19 May 1895; Aberdeen, Scotland
- Died: 13 October 1915 (aged 20); Hulluch, Lens, France
- Cause of death: Killed in action
- Education: Marlborough College
- Occupations: Soldier, Poet, Student
- Writing career
- Period: Early 20th century
- Genre: Poetry
- Notable works: Marlborough and Other Poems
- Military career
- Allegiance: United Kingdom
- Branch: British Army
- Service years: 1914–1915
- Rank: Captain
- Unit: Suffolk Regiment
- Conflicts: First World War: Battle of Loos †

Captain Charles Hamilton Sorley (19 May 1895 – 13 October 1915) was a British Army officer and Scottish war poet who fought in the First World War. He was killed in action during the Battle of Loos in October 1915.

== Life and work ==
Born in Powis House Aberdeen, Scotland, he was the son of philosopher and University Professor William Ritchie Sorley. He was educated at King's College School, Cambridge, and then, like Siegfried Sassoon, at Marlborough College (1908–13). At Marlborough College Sorley's favourite pursuit was cross-country running in the rain, a theme evident in many of his pre-war poems, including Rain and The Song of the Ungirt Runners. In keeping with his strict Protestant upbringing, Sorley had strong views on right and wrong, and on two occasions volunteered to be punished for breaking school rules.

Before taking up a scholarship to study at University College, Oxford, Sorley spent a little more than six months in Germany from January to July 1914, three months of which were at Schwerin studying the language and local culture. Then he enrolled at the University of Jena, and studied there up to the outbreak of World War I.

After Germany declared war on Russia, Sorley was detained for an afternoon in Trier, but was released on the same day and told to leave the country. He returned to England and immediately volunteered for military service in the British Army. He joined the Suffolk Regiment as a second lieutenant and was posted to the 7th (Service) Battalion, a Kitchener's Army unit serving as part of the 35th Brigade of the 12th (Eastern) Division. He arrived on the Western Front in Boulogne, France on 30 May 1915 as a lieutenant, and served near Ploegsteert. He was promoted to captain in August 1915.

Sorley was killed in action near Hulluch, having been shot in the head by a sniper during the final offensive of the Battle of Loos on 13 October 1915. Having no known grave at war's end, he is commemorated on the CWGC Loos Memorial.

Sorley's last poem was recovered from his kit after his death, and includes some of his most famous lines:

When you see millions of the mouthless dead
Across your dreams in pale battalions go

== Legacy ==
Marlborough and Other Poems was published posthumously in January 1916 and immediately became a critical success, with six editions printed that year. His Collected Letters, edited by his parents, were published in 1919.

Robert Graves, a contemporary of Sorley's, described him in his book Goodbye to All That as "one of the three poets of importance killed during the war". (The other two were Isaac Rosenberg and Wilfred Owen.) Sorley may be seen as a forerunner of Sassoon and Owen, and his unsentimental style stands in direct contrast to that of Rupert Brooke.

The last two stanzas of his poem Expectans expectavi were set to music in 1919 by Charles Wood; this anthem for choir and organ quickly established itself in the standard repertoire of Anglican cathedrals and collegiate churches.

Sorley is regarded by some, including the Poet Laureate John Masefield (1878–1967), as the greatest loss of all the poets killed during the war.

On 11 November 1985, Sorley was among 16 Great War poets commemorated on a slate stone unveiled in Westminster Abbey's Poet's Corner. The inscription on the stone was taken from Wilfred Owen's "Preface" to his poems and reads: "My subject is War, and the pity of War. The Poetry is in the pity."

In 2014, Author Andrew O'Hagan visited the site of the Battle of Loos and the spot where Sorley was killed and read aloud Sorley's most famous poem, which O'Hagan called "the great poem of the First World War"

It Is Easy To Be Dead by Neil McPherson, a play on his life, based on his poetry and letters, was presented at the Finborough Theatre, London, and subsequently at Trafalgar Studios, London, in 2016 where it was nominated for an Olivier Award. It subsequently toured to Glasgow and Sorley's birthplace, Aberdeen, in 2018.

On 9 November 2018, an opinion commentary by Aaron Schnoor published in The Wall Street Journal honored the poetry of World War I, including Sorley's poem "When You See Millions of the Mouthless Dead".

== Works ==
- Marlborough and Other Poems. Cambridge University Press, 1916.
- The Letters of Charles Sorley with a chapter of biography. Cambridge University Press. 1919.
- Wilson, Jean Moorcroft (Ed). The Collected Poems of Charles Hamilton Sorley. London: Cecil Woolf, 1985. ISBN 0-900821-53-1.
- Wilson, Jean Moorcroft (Ed). The Collected Letters of Charles Hamilton Sorley. London: Cecil Woolf, 1990.
- Spear, Hilda D. (Ed). The Poems and Selected Letters of Charles Hamilton Sorley. Dundee: Blackness Press, 1978.
