= Anders Lustgarten =

British playwright

Anders Lustgarten is a British playwright, who resides in London.

== Early life ==
Lustgarten is the child of progressive American academics; his mother is Donna Dickenson. He read Chinese Studies at Oxford before heading to Berkeley in California to work towards a PhD. After completing his studies, Lustgarten devised academic courses for prisoners in the UK and USA and taught drama inside prisons in both countries.

== Career ==
Lustgarten turned to playwriting in 2007. His first plays were produced at the Finborough Theatre. He has had attachments at Soho and the National Theatre and commissions from both, as well as from the Bolton Octagon and the Royal Court.

Lustgarten won the inaugural Harold Pinter Playwrights Award with a commission from the Royal Court in 2011. In 2012 he was selected from over 3000 applicants to be on the Channel 4 Screenwriters course.

In 2013 his play If You Don't Let Us Dream, We Won't Let You Sleep premiered at the Royal Court, directed by Simon Godwin. Michael Billington of the Guardian wrote that "while the play has bags of vigour and offers a bracing attack on financial capitalism, Lustgarten tries to cram too much into 75 minutes and rarely offers the dramatic satisfaction of intellectual debate." Henry Hitchings in the London Evening Standard described Lustgarten as "a fierce writer whose activism blends intellectual curiosity and idealism", but observed that "the urgent arguments ... aren’t melded into a cogent drama. These people are mouthpieces. And the play is structurally awkward, not least when it stops abruptly, just as it’s beginning to get really interesting."

In the Financial Times, Griselda Murray Brown wrote that "Characterisation is sketchy, as if secondary to the play’s polemic content, leaving us with types: fat-cat financier, hippy activist, over-skilled immigrant worker" and "The play is packed with witty lines and topical references ... but what it lacks is drama".

Among other critics, Michael Coveney wrote that the play "makes a change: a flat-out protest play that recalls the days of 1970s agitprop", and Andrzej Lukowski of Time Out concluded that "Some of it is funny, some of it is utterly cringe-y, none of it offers any emotional or narrative pay-off for what has come before; the dystopian strand is casually and frustratingly abandoned. Lustgarten may still blossom into a provocateur of substance, but he’s slightly fluffed this big break, with a wonky, underwritten play that loses persuasiveness the minute it slows down."

Anders has adapted The Seven Works of Mercy into a play for the Royal Shakespeare Company. The play, entitled The Seven Acts of Mercy is being performed at the Swan Theatre and is being directed by Erica Whyman. It moves between 1606 Naples and 2016 Bootle, Merseyside and explores a number of socioeconomic issues, such as the housing crisis sweeping across the UK.

== Other work ==
Lustgarten is working on two radio series for BBC Radio Four, and a television pilot for Channel Four.

Alongside his writing, Lustgarten works as a political activist across the world, focusing on the actions of multinational corporations in developing countries.

== Plays ==
=== Original plays ===
- The Secret Theatre, performed at the Sam Wanamaker Playhouse in 2017.
- The Seven Acts of Mercy, directed by Erica Whyman and performed by the Royal Shakespeare Company.
- Kingmakers, one of The Magna Carta Plays performing at the Salisbury Playhouse in Autumn 2015
- Lampedusa at Soho Theatre and HighTide Festival 2015.
- If You Don't Let Us Dream, We Won't Let You Sleep, at the Royal Court Theatre
- The Sugar-Coated Bullets of the Bourgeoisie, with the Finborough Theatre
- A Day at the Racists performed at the Finborough Theatre in early 2011
- Socialism is Great performed in conjunction with A Younger Theatre company and directed by Nicola Sterry
- The Punishment Stories
- Black Jesus performing at the Finborough Theatre until Saturday 26 October 2013
- The Insurgents
- A Torture Comedy
- Enduring Freedom

=== Adaptations ===
- The Police, an adaptation of the Polish play by Slawomir Mrozek
- The Damned United, an adaptation of "The Damned Utd" by David Peace. First performed at the West Yorkshire Playhouse in March 2016.

== Awards ==
- Harold Pinter Playwrights Awards
- Catherine Johnson Award for the Best Play written as part of the Pearson Playwrights’ Scheme
- The Punishment Stories was shortlisted for the Verity Bargate Award 2007
