= Lullabies of Broadmoor: A Broadmoor Quartet =

Lullabies of Broadmoor: A Broadmoor Quartet is a set of four plays by English writer Steve Hennessy, which received its London premiere at the Finborough Theatre in 2004. It returned to that theatre in 2011 after runs at the Corner House in Frome, the Alma Tavern Theatre in Bristol and the Edinburgh Fringe earlier in 2011. As the title suggests, they all deal with prisoners and staff of Broadmoor and the victims of the prisoners' crimes.

== 2011 London casts ==
=== Venus at Broadmoor ===
- Dr. William Orange - Chris Bianchi
- Dr. Beard - Chris Courtenay
- John Coleman, Principal Attendant on the Gentlemen's Block - Chris Donnelly
- Christiana Edmunds - Violet Ryder

=== The Demon Box ===
- Richard Dadd - Chris Bianchi
- William Chester Minor - Chris Courtenay
- John Coleman - Chris Donnelly
- Ariel - Violet Ryder

=== The Murder Club ===
- Ronald True - Chris Bianchi
- Richard Prince - Chris Courtenay
- John Coleman - Chris Donnelly
- Olive Young - Violet Ryder

=== Wilderness ===
- George Merrett - Chris Bianchi
- William Chester Minor - Chris Courtenay
- John Coleman - Chris Donnelly
- Eliza Merrett - Violet Ryder
