= Claire Dowie =

English writer, director, practitioner and actress

Claire Dowie (born 1957 Birmingham, England, United Kingdom) is an English writer, director, practitioner and actress. She was a pioneer of Stand-up Theatre in England. She is a writer for In-yer-face theatre.

Originally she wanted to be a dancer, and toured briefly with a group in Europe. She then moved into comedy. The real breakthrough came when she started writing. Her plays have been translated into German, Spanish, Portuguese and Italian. Recently she published her first novel, Chaos.

== Theatre ==
Dowie's plays explore the themes of gender roles and sexuality. Among her most famous pieces of work are Adult Child / Dead Child, (awarded the Time Out Theatre Award in 1988), Why is John Lennon wearing a skirt? (winner of the London Fringe Award 1991), Drag Act, Easy Access (for the boys) and H to He – I'm turning into a man. She has published two books of her plays.

=== Why is John Lennon Wearing A Skirt? ===
This play follows the story of a 14-year-old girl who wears trousers and would rather play football than share the sudden awakening interests of her friends. Claire Dowie says of her piece: "It's about growing up in the late 60s and early 70s. It's my time, but not necessarily my story. It was the beginning of the feminist movement – bra burning, etc., they just started. Mental one was torn between 'Man from UNCLE' and 'Batman': All the girls had as a role model was Barbie." The play was enacted at many German theatres.

Premiere: Traverse Theatre Edinburgh 1990

=== Adult Child/Dead Child ===
Written in 1987 Adult Child/Dead Child is the story of a young person growing up with their parent's impossibly high standards – "One hundred per cent do it right, do it the best, be brainy, be talented, be sporty, be good, academic athlete, well-mannered, is considered a friend at first until a cruel comment from neighbours results in Benji prompting the child to throw a brick through the neighbours' window. It is at this point that the child declares Benji a "monster, and a horror and a terror." Throughout childhood, Benji is kept a secret, even throughout therapy sessions for fear of ending up in "The Snake Pit". Eventually, in the second half of the monologue, the child leaves home and is forced to face a world which expects them to behave in an adult manner, despite their feelings that they are still a child and thus need the support of one. Eventually, due to Benji causing trouble, the child is sectioned and begins to shake off Benji and their fears and begins to live on their own in the "adult" manner which so confused them before, although at the end it is left ambiguous as to whether the character has made a full recovery.

Premiere: Finborough Theatre Club, London 1987.

=== Hardworking Families ===
Written in 2015 This play focuses on the differences between an unemployed mother and a mother who is a CEO of a business. Politicians often talk about getting jobs and lives of the British Public slowly fall apart. The play was a response to Dowie hearing Politicians in the Media repeating the phrase "Hard Working Families" which lead her to question what makes a family hard working.

The original version was written for a large cast after several years of being a Patron and audience for the Birmingham-based Youth Theatre Stage2, whom Dowie gave the first rights to perform at the Crescent Main House Theatre in Birmingham (January 2016).

== Selected works ==
=== Plays ===
- Adult Child/Dead Child, Finborough Theatre, London, 1987
- All Over Lovely, Drill Hall, London, 1997
- Cat And Mouse, 1986
- Death and Dancing, BAC, London, 1992
- Designs for Living, Drill Hall, London, 2001
- Drag Act, Drill Hall, London, 1993
- Easy Access (for the Boys), Drill Hall, London, 1998
- Leaking From Every Orifice, BAC Main, London, 1994
- Why Is John Lennon Wearing A Skirt?, Riverside, London, 1991
- The Year of the Monkey, Studio 2, London, 2000
- Hardworking Families, Kings Heath, Birmingham 2015

TV Short Films

Came Out, It Rained, Went Back In Again

=== German-language publications ===
- Chaos, Merlin Verlag 2008, ISBN 978-3-87536-255-8
