= David Gilmore (theatre director) =

English theatre director

- Born: 7 December 1945 (age 80); London, England
- Education: Alleyn's School, Dulwich, Cheltenham Grammar School
- Spouse: Fiona Mollison
- Children: 3

David Gilmore is a British theatre director. He has directed many productions in London’s West End, as well as other theatres throughout the country and abroad. He was also artistic director of the Watermill Theatre, Berkshire, the Nuffield Theatre, Southampton, and the St James Theatre, London. He is married to actress Fiona Mollison.

== Career ==
Gilmore was appointed artistic director of the Watermill Theatre, Berkshire, in 1976, and remained there for three years. He was then appointed artistic director of the Nuffield Theatre, Southampton, where he remained for five years. He was artistic director of the St James Theatre, built to replace the Westminster Theatre after it was demolished in 2002. He left the role in 2013.

=== UK Productions ===
During his time at the Nuffield, Gilmore directed productions of The Tempest and The Merchant of Venice, as well as Uncle Vanya, Summer and Smoke, Candida, and Hedda Gabler. He also directed works by Christopher Hampton, Michael Frayn, Frank Wedekind, Terence Rattigan and Noël Coward.

Gilmore has directed many West End productions, including Lend Me a Tenor and Daisy Pulls It Off, both at the Gielgud Theatre, and The Hired Man. Other London productions include The Resistible Rise of Arturo Ui starring Griff Rhys Jones, Chapter Two at the Queens starring Sharon Gless and Tom Conte, A Swell Party at the Vaudeville, the award-winning Defending the Caveman, and the Dominion production of Grease and subsequent worldwide productions. Other West End productions include Radio Times, Beyond Reasonable Doubt starring Frank Finlay, and Sinatra at the London Palladium.

He directed Sir Anthony Quayle in Dandy Dick, Machiavelli’s Mandragola at the National Theatre, Cavalcade at the Chichester Festival Theatre, and The Winter's Tale for the Regents Park Theatre.

London Fringe productions include Jane Clegg at the Finborough, and Crimes of the Heart at the King’s Head. Gilmore also directed the final tour of Harvey and the Wallbangers, as well as national tours of Noises Off and Steel Magnolias.

=== Overseas Productions ===
Overseas productions include the Australian productions of Grease, Song and Dance, Footloose, and Happy Days at the Sydney SuperDome.European productions include French operetta La Haut at the Théâtre des Variétés in Paris and Théâtre des Célestins in Lyon, Hair at the Palais Des Sports (also Paris), and Glengarry Glen Ross at the Royal Flemish Theatre in Brussels. Gilmore also staged As You Like It at the Chicago Shakespeare Theater and Gas Light at the Mirvish Theatre Toronto.
