= João Garcia Miguel =

Portuguese theater director, playwright, visual artist and performer

- João Miguel Osório de Castro Garcia dos Santos
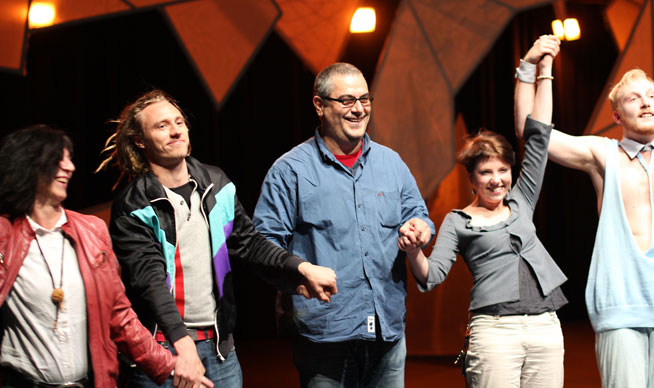
- João Garcia Miguel at the Norwegian Theatre Academy
- Born: 1961 (age 63–64); Lisbon
- Website: www.joaogarciamiguel.com

João Garcia Miguel (João Miguel Osório de Castro Garcia dos Santos, born in Lisbon, 1961) is a Portuguese theater director, playwright, visual artist and performer. He began his career in the 1990s and is generally characterized as a postdramatic theatre artist. His artistic performances have been described as "hybrid theater asserting an alternative concept of globalization, establishing an invigorating line of work, between the spectacle of society and the society of spectacle". One of the most visible and relevant aspects of Garcia Miguel's theatrical work is the way he reworks classic texts of European theater through disruption and innovation, using interactive technologies. Special Nothing/Especial Nada (2003, with Anton Skrzypiciel and Miguel Borges) presented at the Edinburgh Fringe Festival was considered by The Herald as "a fabulous blast" and "the inspired springboard for a fascinating window into creative processes and what constitutes 'art'". Burgher King Lear (2006, also interpreted by Skrzypiciel and Borges) was selected as one of the best 2006 Portuguese performances and described as one of the most accomplished and intelligent deconstructions of a classical theater text recently staged, achieving success in Spain, where it was awarded the FAD Sebastià Gash 2008 Prize (Barcelona).

== Artistic activity ==
Garcia Miguel started his professional artistic activity between the late '80s and early '90s while studying at FBAUL-Lisbon Faculty of Fine Arts. He became involved as a founder and participant in many art collectives – exploring artistic areas such as painting, installation and performance.

He is one of the founders of the experimental group Canibalismo Cósmico that creates performances and installations. He was involved in the foundation of Lisbon's ZDB Art Gallery. Between 1991 and 2002 he directed the Theater Association OLHO (Eye). This company has been considered as a fundamental landmark in the renovation of the theatrical language of the late twentieth century in Portugal.

In 2003 Garcia Miguel started working as an artistic director, theater director, actor and artist. He founded an artistic and cultural venue in Lisbon called Espaço do Urso e dos Anjos (The Bear and the Angels Venue). In 2008 he was appointed Artistic Director of Teatro-Cine de Torres Vedras, a theater owned by the municipality of Torres Vedras 40 minutes away from Lisbon center. Garcia Miguel is also affiliated in the Actor's Center, in Rome, Italy.

Garcia Miguel's main artistic project is the rewriting and reinterpretation of classic texts and biographies, including Samuel Beckett, Bertolt Brecht, Miguel de Cervantes, Anton Chekhov, Jean Genet, Peter Handke, Fernando Pessoa, Shakespeare, Sophocles, August Strindberg, Gertrude Stein, Andy Warhol and Virginia Woolf, in addition to the production of original texts.

Garcia Miguel has collaborated with artists and performers such as Andres Beladiez, Alberto Lopes, Anton Skrypiciel, Carlos Pimenta, Chema Leon, Clara Andermatt], Custodia Calego, Edgar Pêra, Francisco Rocha, Lucia Sigalho, Luis Guerra, João Fiadeiro, João Brites, Michael Margotta, Miguel Borges, Miguel Moreira, Nuno Cardoso, Rui Gato, Rui Horta, Sara Ribeiro, Steve Bird and Steve Denton.

His work has been exhibited in France, England, Wales, Germany, Senegal, Norway and Spain. Since 1995 Garcia Miguel has regularly presented his work in the most important theatre venues of the country: Centro Cultural de Belém – CCB (1995, 2000, 2008, 2010), Teatro Nacional São João /PONTI Festival, Teatro Carlos Alberto (1999, 2005, 2006, 2010), Teatro Rivoli (2001), ACARTE/ Centro de Arte Moderna]/FCG (2002, 2003), Nacional Theatre D. Maria II/Teatro da Politécnica (2007), Teatro Maria Matos (2009), Teatro A Comuna (2009), Culturgest (2010), amongst many others. He regularly participates in National and International Festivals such as Festival Internacional de Almada, Festival A8, P.O.N.T.I. in Porto, Citemor in Montemor-o-Velho, Festival Les Bernardines (2002, 2004), Marseille, Fringe Festival, Edinburgh, Festival de Almagro, Festival AltVigo, MadFeria de Madrid, among others.

== Style and artistic approach ==
The search for an experimental poetic language is one of the most important features of Garcia Miguel's work. As Fred Kahn described in 2004 in an article published in UBU – European Stages Journal, dedicated to the Portuguese Theater scene: "João Garcia Miguel is an artist of globalization. His work is an attempt at presenting a clean and clear transcript of what the global existence of the individual's global existence, by which we can understand a being connected to others on multiple levels, living in a global environment open to infinite influences, each vaguer than the other. (…) He is therefore a man working on multiplication rather than scattering. His career has been quite atypical and may wrongly be classified as chaotic, but in truth it shows a constant search for a unique poetic language."

After several years exploring the complexity of scenic machinery Garcia Miguel started a new area of dramaturgical and scenographic research based on the creation of a technology that expands the "phenomenal body of the actor" on stage.

Garcia Miguel displays a taste for risk, for provocation, obscurity and the enlightenment of crossing boundaries, the enchanted machinery, baroque conceptualism and a sophisticated sense of humor. He acquired a nickname—The Bear. He uses contradiction as a methodological element and puts himself frequently in antagonistic positions as an instrumental resource for the development of aesthetic perspectives. He seeks a theater that works like a hallucinogenic.

=== The Anarchist Banker ===
The first work that clearly explored his new approach was The Anarchist Banker based on a story by Fernando Pessoa, premiered in Lisbon in 2009. At a table in a restaurant, two friends talk about the social situation and one of them says that, paradoxically, he became a banker because he was politically an anarchist. The absurdity of the situation, the lack of theatricality and the mental flirtation of this character, lead, according to Garcia Miguel, to a portrait of life that most listeners know and has many similarities with reality shows. The effect of expansion of the performer’s body was created by extreme close-ups using web-cams installed very closed to the actor’s body, projected on big screens.

=== The Son of Europe ===
In The Son of Europe (2010), based on Peter Handke’s piece Kaspar, Garcia Miguel and his team created a three-dimensional device that increased the perception of the rhythm and audio visual impulses created by the actors, using four video projectors and four web-cams. The images captured by the cameras in real time were then edited through a matrix software system. With this kind of experiment, Garcia Miguel creates new ways of public involvement with the performance.

=== Romeo and Juliet ===
Garcia Miguel employs a ritualistic and post-dramatic logic in this work. He seeks a new way of reading Artaud’s ideas about experimental theater, updating them with the new challenges imposed by the fluidity and ambivalence of the contemporary world (Zigmunt Bauman). This is visible in his staging of Shakespeare's Romeo and Juliet (2011). His approach to the piece relates directly to the ways contemporary theater has been reinventing itself. The role of the characters Romeo and Juliet is not, in Garcia Miguel’s piece, to tell us a story, but to serve as mirrors that produce cultural-aesthetic reflexivity to think about the social drama (Victor Turner) that loving and being loved represents in the present society. In this staging, using only the two main characters, we see the lovers as shamans engaged with the contradictions of the present society.

== Teaching and research ==
Since 2002 Garcia Miguel has been developing new research strategies in the artistic field, teaching and investigating in an academic context. His master's degree in Culture and Communication Technologies led him to create an introductory study that hybridizes visual culture and the performing arts. Since 2007, he attended a PhD Program in Theater and Visual arts at the University of Alcalá de Henares (Spain) and the Lisbon Fine Arts Faculty. He worked with students from the main Portuguese performing arts schools and more recently in the UK (Aberystwyth Arts Centre) and Norway (Norwegian Theatre Academy).

== Awards ==
Prize FAD Sebastiá Gasch Performance Arts, for the direction of the show Burgher King Lear, Barcelona, 2008.

Honours for the Award Maria Helena Perdigão, ACARTE, Fundação Calouste Gulbenkian for direction of the show EL- Carrying on shoulders in a quarter time syncopated, 1992

Award Theater of a Decade with the show EL- Carrying on shoulders in a quarter time syncopated march, OLHO Theatre Company, 1992.

Award for the best scenography, best original soundtrack and honours for the show Humanauta, OLHO Theatre Company, 1994.

Award for the best scenography, wardrobe and original soundtrack with the show Warrior, OLHO Theatre Company, 1995.

== Works (Selection 2011-2003) ==
Romeu and Juliet – staging and adaptation of William Shakespeare's text, premiered in Lisbon October 2011.

Look at me now, Here I am, – staging and adaptation of Gertrude Stein's texts about Picasso and Matisse, premiered in Fredrikstad in July 2011 at NTA – Norwegian Theatre School.

Mother Courage – staging of Bertolt Brecht's piece, premiered in Lisbon, at CCB, January 2011.

Cherry Orchard – staging of Anton Chekhov's work at the Arts Center of Aberystwyth and Swansea Theater of Tallinn, premiered October and November 2010.

Son of Europe – writing and staging based on Peter Handke's "Kasper", premiered in Oporto, FITEI, June 2010.

Waiting for Godot – staging of Samuel Beckett's piece, premiered in Azores April 2010.

The Anarchist Banker – staging of Fernando Pessoas's text and additional writing, premiered in Lisbon, at Maria Matos Theatre, in December 2009.

Blood /Antígona's studies – staging and adaptation of Sophocles' piece, premiered in Lisbon, at Comuna Theatre, July 2009.

The Maids – staging, translation and adaptation from Jean Genet's piece, premiered in Lisbon, at CCB, September 2008.

The Old House – staging of the Portuguese writer Luiz Pacheco's text, premiered in Palmela, Portugal, July 2008.

Made in Éden: an Ode to my dead friends – staging and dramaturgy of Epístolas de Guerra from Adolfo Luxúria Canibal, premiered in November 2007 Politécnica Theatre, Lisbon.

Making good use of death – Directing (with Miguel Borges) of Pier Paolo Pasolini's texts, premiered in Lisbon, July 2007 at Casa D’Os Dias da Água.

Burgher King Lear – staging and dramaturgy based on William Shakespeare King Lear, premiered in Black Box (Montemor-o-Novo) November 2006.

Story of a Lier – staging and adicional writing based on Ibsen's Peer Gynt, premiered in Casa de Teatro in Sintra, June 2006.

Delivery – staging and adicional writing (with Luís Vieira) based on different texts by Strindberg. Casa de Teatro de Sintra, Dezembro 2005 e Casa D’Os Dias da Água, Janeiro de 2006

Ruins – staging and adicional writing (with Luís Vieira) based on different texts by Strindberg, premiered in Teatro Carlos Alberto – Porto, June 2005. Co-production with Teatro Bruto and TNSJ.

The Waves – acting and co-creation with Clara Andermatt and Michael Margotta based on Virginia Woolf's book, premiered in Oeiras July 2004.

Special Nothing – Staging and writing based on Andy Warhol's diaries. Premiered in Capitals, Lisbon September 2003. Presentation at the Edinburgh Festival Fringe, August 2006.
