= Adam Brace =

British playwright (1980–2023)

- Born: Adam George Brace; 25 March 1980; London, England
- Died: 29 April 2023 (aged 43); London, England
- Education: University of Kent (BA)
- Occupations: Playwright; director
- Partner: Rebecca Fuller
- Writing career
- Years active: 2008–2023

Adam George Brace (25 March 1980 – 29 April 2023) was a British playwright and director. Brace was the resident associate dramaturg of Soho Theatre in London.

== Background ==
Adam George Brace was born in London on 25 March 1980, to George Brace, an architect, and Nikki (née Sturdy), a floor manager at the BBC. His father died in a bicycle accident several months before his son's birth. Brace attended the University of Kent, where he earned a degree in drama. His first jobs included teaching English in South Korea and working as a children's entertainer in Malaysia. He was briefly a journalist for The Irish Post, but was fired after publicly disparaging a film at a Q-and-A held for the press screening. Brace was also a master's student at Goldsmiths, University of London, though sources differ on whether or not he received a degree.

== Career ==
His play Stovepipe, performed in promenade, premiered at the HighTide festival in Suffolk in 2008, before transferring to London for an eight-week run in collaboration with the National Theatre. The play was written by Brace after touring Jordan, where he conducted interviews with corporate soldiers. Stovepipe garnered critical acclaim, receiving numerous five star reviews, and was deemed "rivetingly intelligent" by The Sunday Times and "exhilaratingly convincing" by The Independent. The play was named Best Political Theatre of the Year by Time Out and one of the top 10 plays of the decade by The Sunday Times. Other plays include They Drink It in the Congo (Almeida Theatre, 2016) and A Real Humane Person Who Cares and All That (Edinburgh Fringe, 2008 / Arcola Theatre, 2009).

Brace worked extensively as a director, with credits including Liz Kingsman's One Woman Show at the Ambassadors Theatre, London and Soho Theatre. He also collaborated as a director or script editor with acts including Jessie Cave, Ahir Shah, Janine Harouni, Ruby Wax and Sh!t Theatre, the latter a theatrical duo consisting of Louise Mothersole and Brace's partner, Rebecca Fuller.

At the time of Brace's death, he was preparing a Broadway production of his one-man show Just for Us, set to run at the Hudson Theatre in the summer of 2023, with Alex Edelman starring. At the 76th Primetime Emmy Awards, held on 15 September 2024, Edelman won the Outstanding Writing for a Variety Special award for a performance of the show that aired on HBO. In his acceptance speech, Edelman commemorated Brace's death and "the end of a seven-year journey with the show".

== Personal life and death ==
Brace was in a relationship with stage performer Rebecca Fuller, known by her stage name, Rebecca Biscuit. He died at a hospital in London from complications of a stroke on 29 April 2023, at the age of 43.
