= New End Theatre =

Former theatre in Hampstead, London

Coordinates: 51.5588°N 0.1774°W

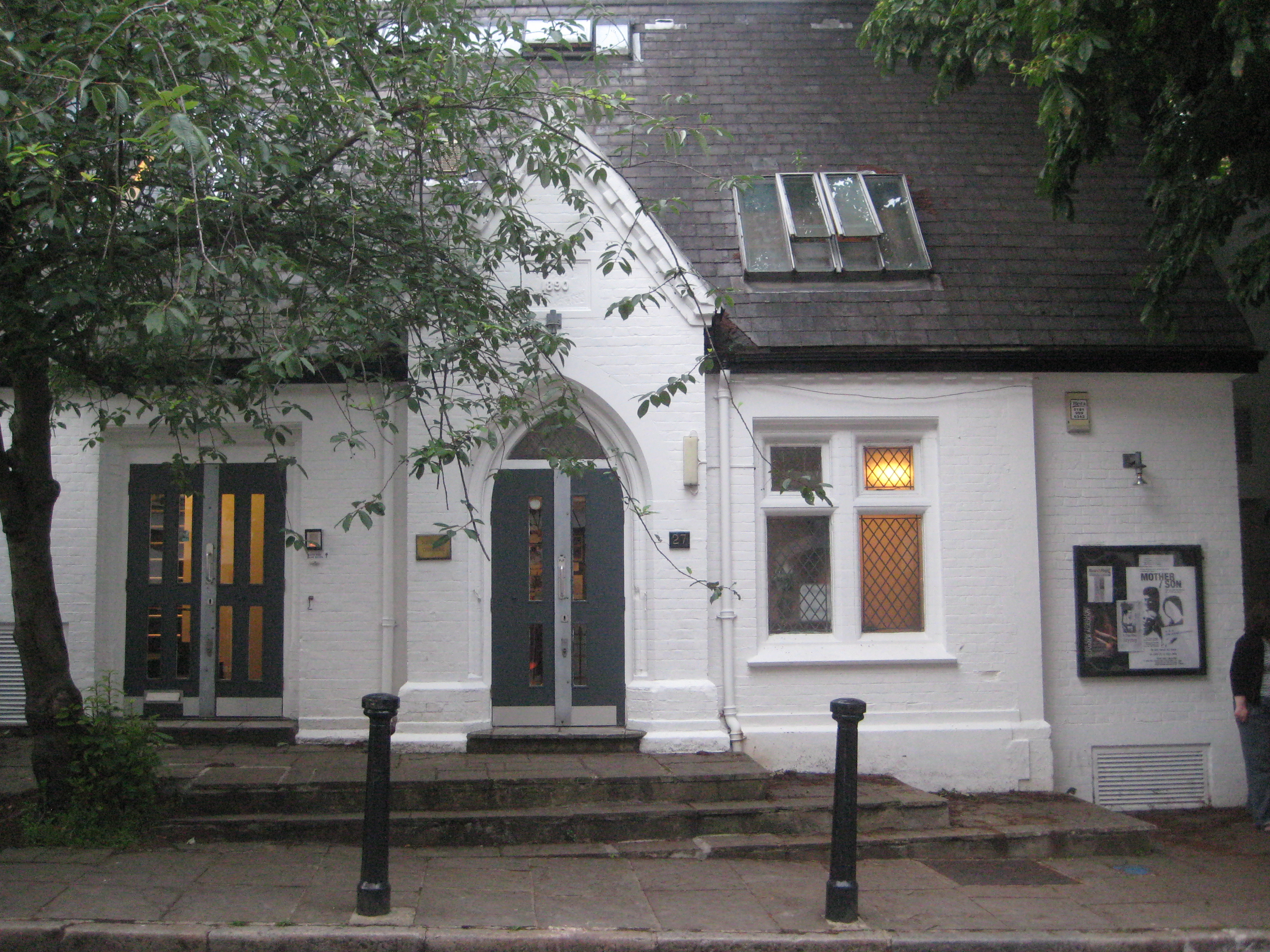
The New End Theatre in 2008

The New End Theatre, Hampstead, was an 80-seat fringe theatre venue in London, at 27 New End in the London Borough of Camden which operated from 1974 until 2011.

It was founded in 1974 by Buddy Dalton in the converted mortuary of the now-defunct New End Hospital. The mortuary was formerly linked to the hospital across the road by a tunnel. It was owned by Roy and Sonia Saunders from 1986 until 1997. Its Artistic Directors included Sonia Saunders (1986–92), Jon Harris (1992–96) and Neil McPherson (1996–97). From 1997 to 2011 it was both owned and run by Artistic Director and Chief Executive Brian Daniels.

It had a number of successes, including A Day in Hollywood / A Night in the Ukraine, which transferred to both the West End and Broadway; world premieres of work by Jean Anouilh, Steven Berkoff, Tom Kempinski, Richard Stirling, Arnold Wesker, Tony McHale, and Geoffrey Williams' play Tunnels Without End.

The building was converted into a synagogue and Jewish cultural centre in 2011.
