= Neil McPherson (artistic director) =

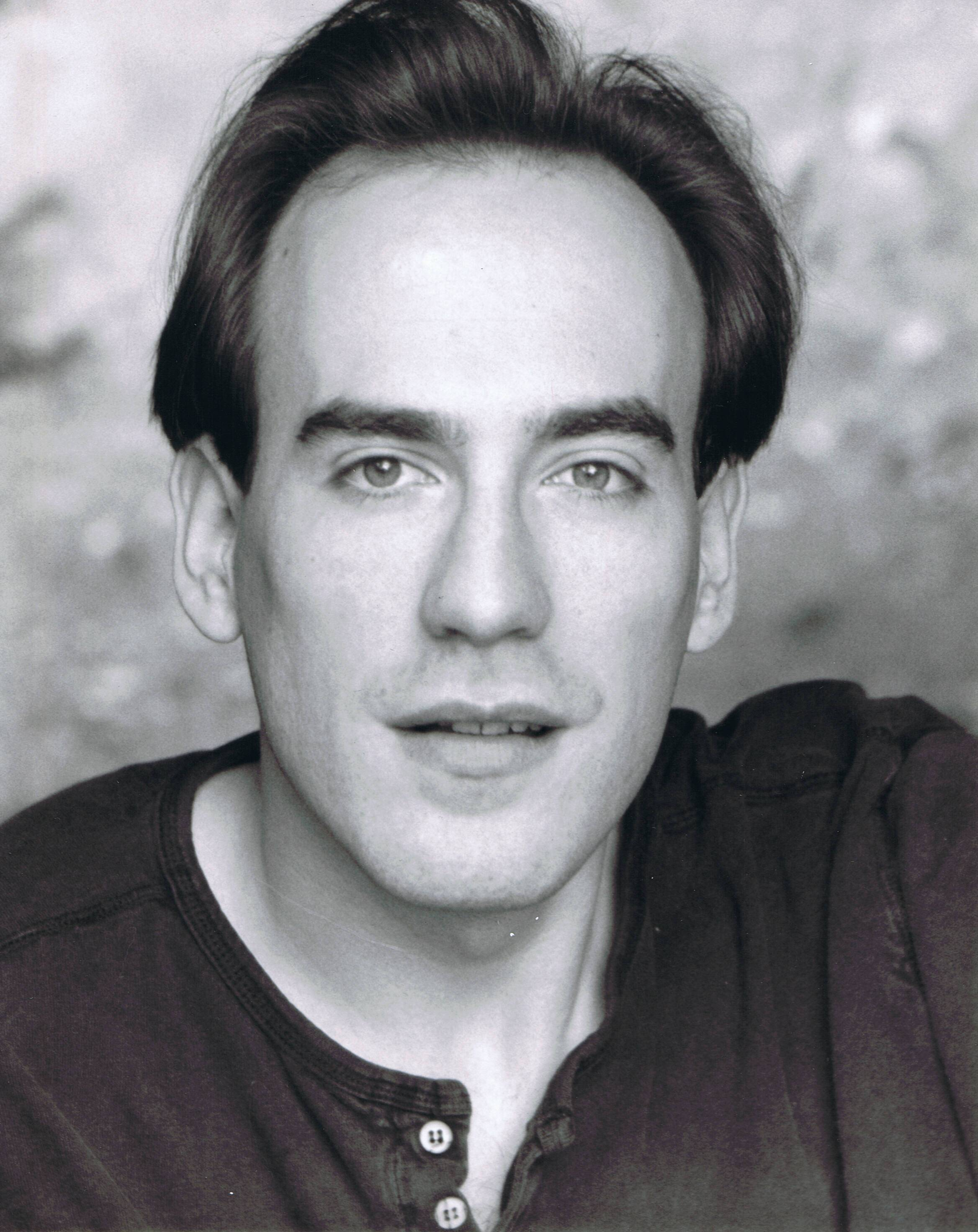
- Born: 7 October 1969 (age 57); London, England; United Kingdom
- Education: Royal Central School of Speech and Drama
- Awards: Best Artistic Director in the London Fringe Report Awards 2009. Writers Guild of Great Britain Award for the Encouragement of New Writing 2010. Offie 2011 Best Artistic Director . Offie 2012 Best Artistic Director. Named one of The Hospital Club 100 by Time Out and The Hospital Club 2012. Best Play of the Year for I Wish To Die Singing in the UK Studio Theatre Awards 2016. Olivier Award nomination for It Is Easy To Be Dead 2017. The Critics' Circle Special Award for Services to Theatre 2019.

Neil McPherson (born London, 7 October 1969) is an artistic director and playwright.

== Artistic directing ==
He was Artistic Director of the New End Theatre, Hampstead, from 1996 to 1997, and has been the Artistic Director of the Finborough Theatre, London, since January 1999.

== Acting ==
He trained as an actor at the Central School of Speech and Drama and was a member of the National Youth Theatre for seven years. His acting roles included John Osborne in A Better Class of Person for Thames TV.

== Playwriting ==
As a playwright, his plays include a documentary drama on the Armenian genocide, the award-winning I Wish To Die Singing – Voices From The Armenian Genocide which played at the Finborough Theatre in April 2015 while an excerpt was also produced in Los Angeles concurrently, and It Is Easy To Be Dead, based on the life of Charles Hamilton Sorley which played at the Finborough Theatre in May 2016, and transferred to Trafalgar Studios, London, in November 2016 where it was nominated for an Olivier Award. It also went on tour to Aberdeen and Glasgow in 2018.

I Wish To Die Singing – Voices From The Armenian Genocide and It Is Easy To Be Dead are both published by Oberon Books.
