= Mohammed Al Shanfari =

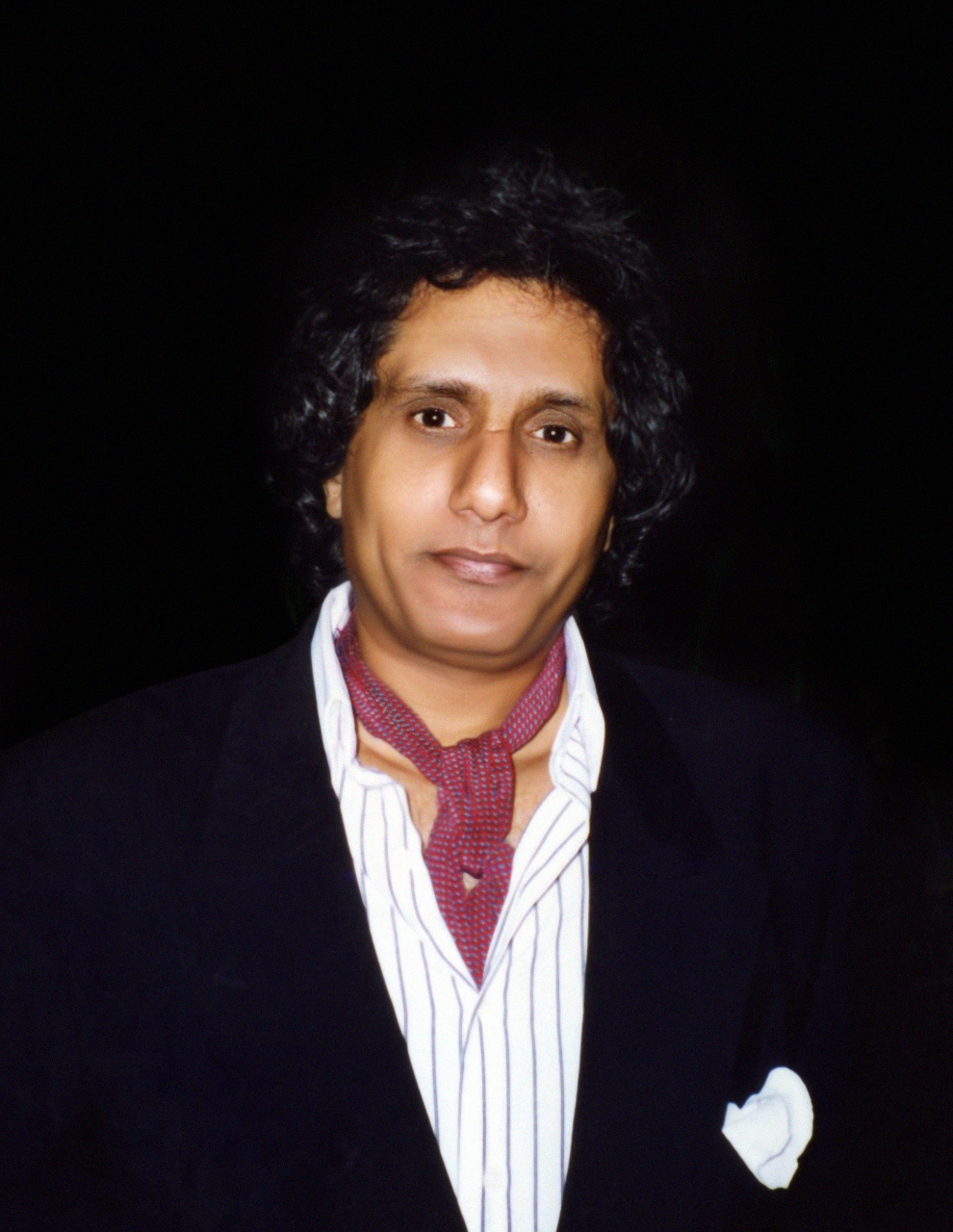
- Mohammed Said Al-Shanfari
- Born: Mohammed bin Said bin Asalm Al Shanfari; December 26, 1949; Salalah, Dhofar, Oman
- Died: April 9, 2016 (aged 66); Muscat, Al-Khwair, Oman
- Occupations: Playwright/Screenwriter; Teacher; Director
- Years active: 1975–1996
- Spouse: Sarah Topolska

Mohammed bin Said bin Asalm Al Shanfari (Arabic: محمد بن سعيد الشنفري) (26 December 1949 - 9 April 2016) was an Omani dramatist playwright and director. It was said of him that “His ideas inspired a generation.” He spent his working life advancing the cause of drama and the theatre. He received several awards in recognition of his work together with favourable reviews in Arabian media while he was alive, and also after his death.

He highlighted the need to hone the skills of Omanis working in drama to encourage the development of new generations of artists capable of taking dramatic art forward throughout Oman. As a teacher, he conducted practical training courses throughout the country. He aimed to encourage talented young Omanis to achieve their full potential and to this end his advice and experience were freely available to all who might benefit therefrom.

He was the author of many written works on theatre related subjects and of as yet unpublished works of poetry.

== Early life and education ==
He was born on 26 December 1949, in Salalah, Dhofar, Oman. where he and his two brothers Ahmed and Abdullah were raised. His mother, who died while he was young, was Saida Bint Abdulazis Al Ruwas and his father was Sheikh Said Bin Asalm Mohammed Al Shanfari. His earliest education was from tutors at home. At age 10 he went to the Al Saidiya School in Salalah. At age 12 he left Oman and went to an English-curriculum Oil-company school in Abu Dhabi from which he graduated.

He held a master's degree in Theatrical Directing which he obtained from the University of Sofia, Bulgaria, in 1974; a Higher Diploma in Theatre Studies which he obtained from Cardiff University, United Kingdom, in 1978; and a Television Sciences Higher Diploma which he obtained from Syracuse University, New York, United States, in 1980.

== Career ==
Mohammed Al-Shanfari began his professional career in The Sultanate of Oman in 1975 when he became Head of the Theatre Section at the (then) Ministry of Information and Culture which was responsible for the development of youth drama. He established the first official national theatre group in Oman which is known today as The Youth Theatre. He delivered many training courses in the field of Theatre Arts, aiming to improve the skills of young Omanis in the Youth Theatre throughout Oman to prepare them for a better role in the field of theatre and in culture in general. He continued working at the Ministry until 1978, when he was appointed Director of Local Programs and Director of Play-writing at Sultanate of Oman Television, where he prepared and directed Drama works for Omani Television, a position he held until 1981. He worked as Director of the Oman Youth Theatre from 1981 to 1992. From 1992 to 1995 he worked as an Arts Specialist in the Office of the Deputy Director General of the General Assembly for Youth Sport and Cultural Activities. In 1995 and 1996 he was an Arts Specialist in the Office of the President of the General Assembly, President for Youth Sport and Cultural Activities until his retirement on 1 December 1996.

Mr Al-Shanfari was a Referee on the committee for evaluation of religious TV programs at the first TV festival in the Gulf, in Kuwait, in 1979. He represented Oman at the Cannes International Film Festival (Cannes Film Festival) in 1981. He was a representative of Oman at the Arab-African Film Symposium in Mogadishu, Somalia, in 1981. He was a member of the Cultural Committee of the General Secretary of the Gulf Cooperation Council, (Arab states of the Persian Gulf), 1982-1986 He participated in the first theatre festival in the Gulf, in Kuwait, in March 1988.

He made a significant contribution to the cultural life of his native Oman. In 1976 he produced and directed for theatre and TV the Play “The Death Song” by Tawfiq al-Hakim. In 1981 he directed "Family of a Fisherman" (عائلة النوخذه) for the Omani National Youth Theatre In 1982 he produced “The Homeland” a play by Mansour Makkawi (ar:منصور مكاوي), which was directed by Mustafa Hashish at the Intercontinental Hotel, Muscat. In 1983 at the Intercontinental Hotel Muscat he produced "The Flag" which was directed by Mustafa Hashish and also produced and directed "The Migrating Bird" – both plays by Mansour Makkawi. In 1984 at the Intercontinental Hotel in Muscat he produced Mansour Makkawi's play "The Well" which was directed by Mustafa Hashish. In 1985 he produced and directed “The Dowry”, a play by Mansoor Makkawi, at The Ministry of Heritage and Culture Auditorium in Muscat. In 1986 he produced and directed “The Stranger”, by Mansoor Makkawi, at the Al Bustan Palace Hotel Auditorium, Muscat In 1987 he wrote produced and directed "The Rat " at the Al-Bustan Palace Hotel Auditorium, Muscat. In 1988 he wrote produced and directed "The Deluded Millionaire" at the Al-Bustan Palace Hotel Auditorium, Muscat. Also in 1988 he produced and directed "The Knight" an Operetta by Mansour Makkawi at the Al-Bustan Palace Hotel Auditorium, Muscat. In 1994 he produced and directed “Welcome, dear Grandma,” by Abdul Karim bin Ali Jawad, at the Technical College Auditorium, Muscat. And in 1995 he directed “Silver Anniversary”, an Operetta by Dr. Abdullah Al Utaibi, at the Al Bustan Palace Hotel Auditorium, Muscat

He initiated the first open air theatre in Oman for the fifth National Festival in 1975 in Salalah, Oman. He prepared and directed the “Gala Evening” in the Star Cinema Theatre in Muscat during the National Day celebrations in 1976. He prepared and directed the “Gala Evening” for the Army Day in Al Muntafa in 1976.He prepared and directed the open-air night party during the Gulf States Football Championship in Muscat in 1984.He found and developed the location for the first Youth Theatre festival at national level in Oman in 1990. He was head of the National Committee of Art Competence in the fields of theatre, music, singing and dancing. He was head of the Oman Committee for evaluating texts in the theatre until his retirement in December 1996

== Awards and nominations ==
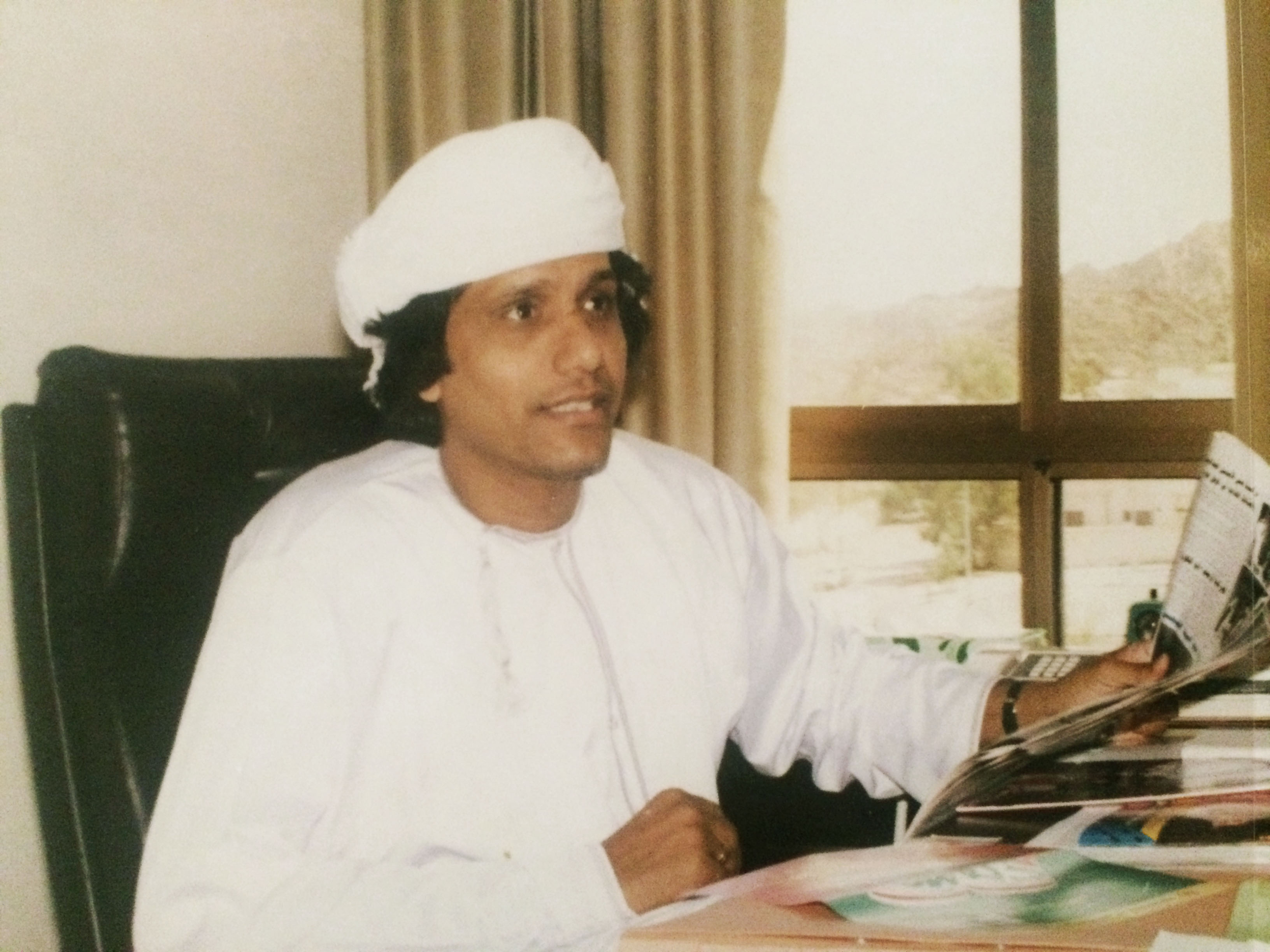
Mohammed Said Al-Shanfari seen here in 1984

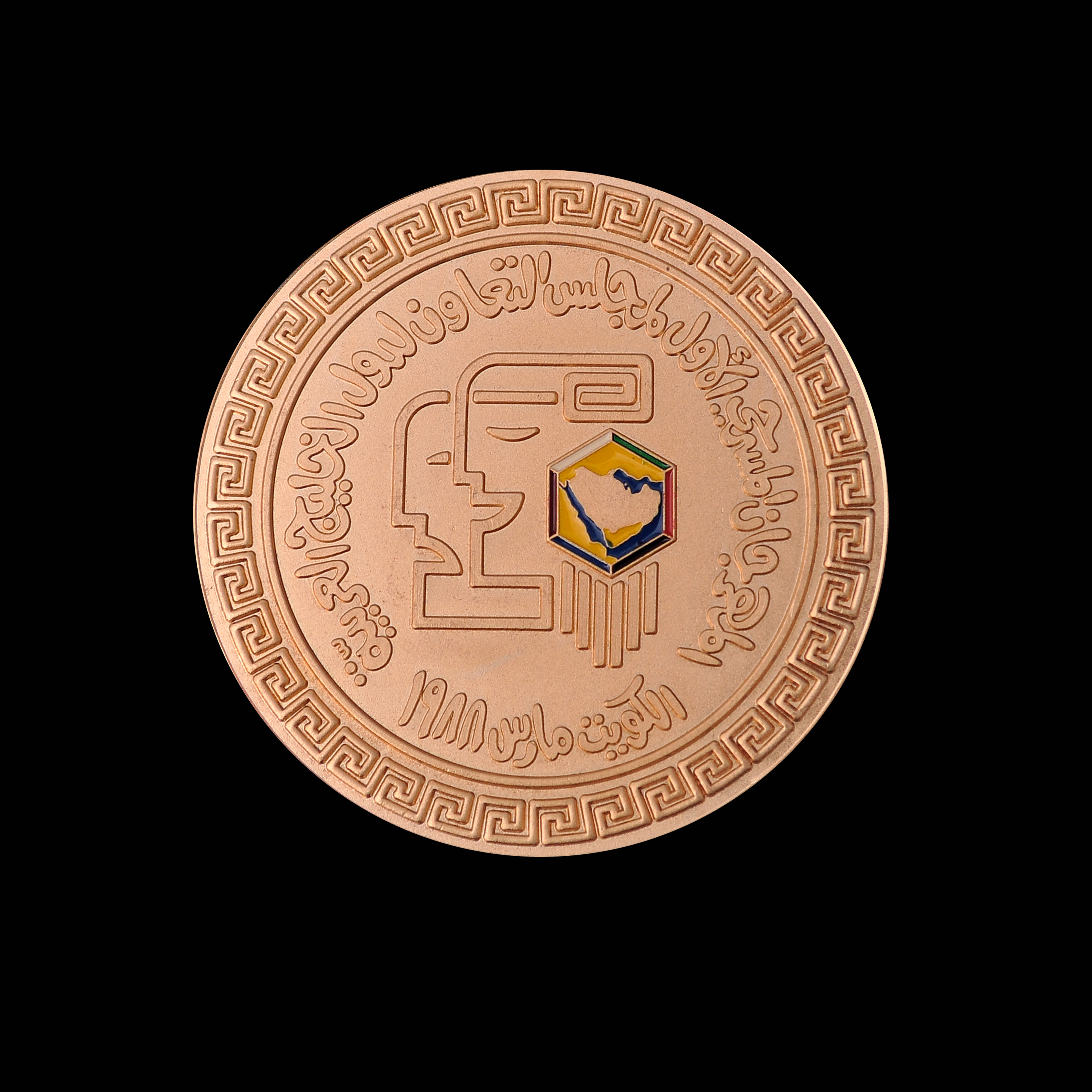
Gold Medal at the First Theatrical Festival of the GCC Countries Kuwait 1988

- The Gold Medal for senior members of the theatre movement in the Gulf in the first Gulf States (Arab states of the Persian Gulf) Theater Festival held in Kuwait in 1988.
- A certificate of appreciation from the General Secretariat of the Gulf States, Kuwait, 1988.
- The Oman Gold Medal and a certificate of appreciation from the higher committee for national festivals in Oman, 1990.
- A second Oman Gold medal with a certificate of appreciation from the higher committee for national festivals in Oman, 1993.
- The private theatre medal awarded during the first seminar for private theatre staff - April 2000 to May 2000.
- A medal in recognition of his role in establishing and activating the Arab theatre movement from the 12 Gulf States Theatre Festival held in Salalah, Oman. 2012
- The Arab Artist Society “Lifetime Achievement Award” November 2016 (Posthumous.)
- The Oman Society for Theatre on the occasion of International Theatre Day March 2017 (Posthumous.)

== Bibliography ==
1987 “The Rat”. Published by the Ministry of Education (Oman)

1988 "The Deluded Millionaire". Published by The Ministry of Education, Oman.

== Filmography ==
In 1976 he prepared and directed - for both theatre and Omani Television - the Play “The Death Song” by the Arab writer Tawfiq al-Hakim and in the same year he prepared and directed the series “Broken Glass.” This was the first drama shown on Omani TV and it participated in the first Gulf TV festival in Kuwait. The series received a certificate of appreciation.

In 1977 he directed for Omani TV the play “Al Naw-Kadeh Family” which was based on the play “The Al Dughry Family” by the Arab writer No'man Ashour

Between 1976 and 1981 he prepared, directed and participated in many works for Omani TV including interviews and a variety of other programs.

== Stage work ==
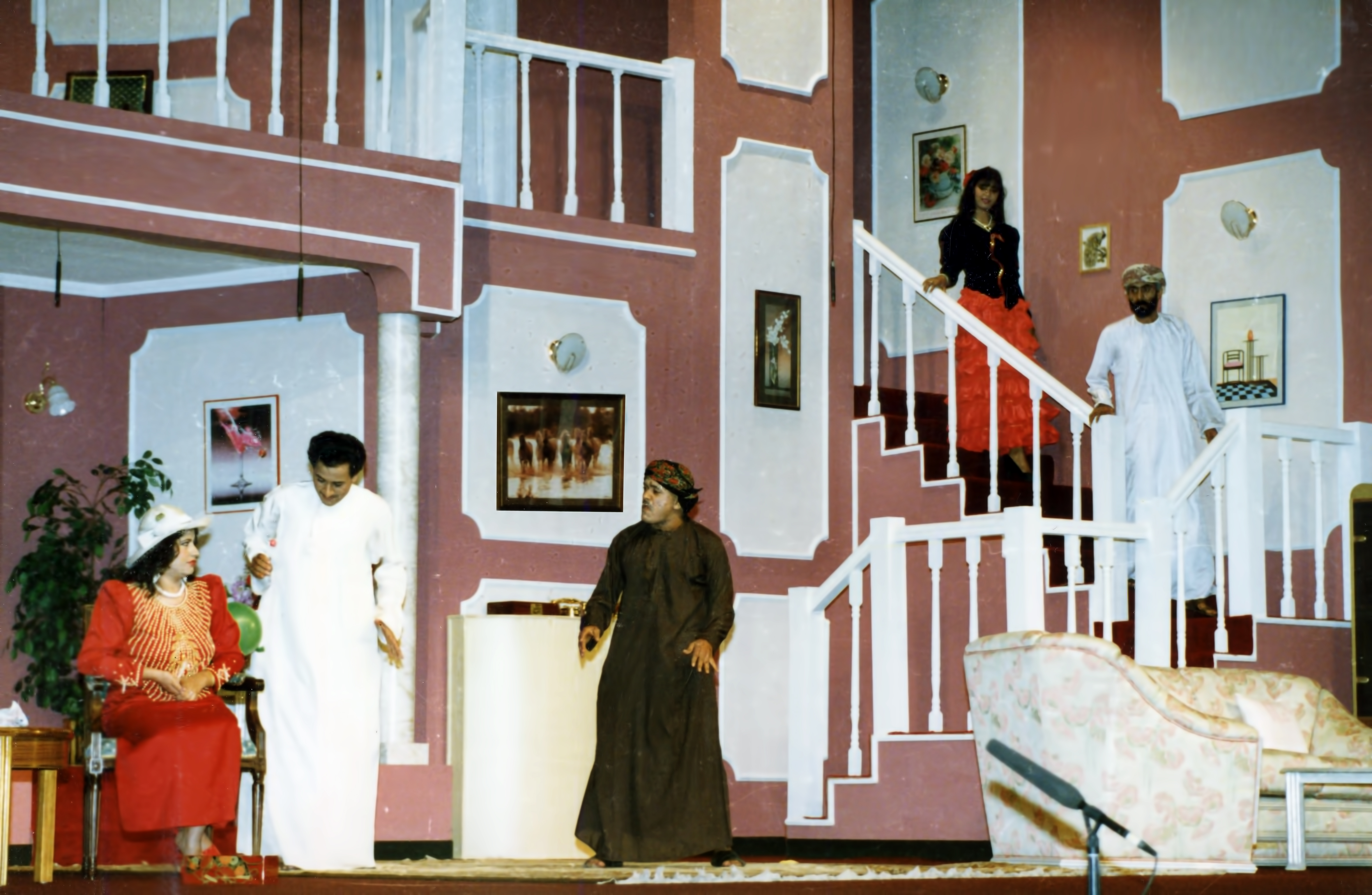
The Rat

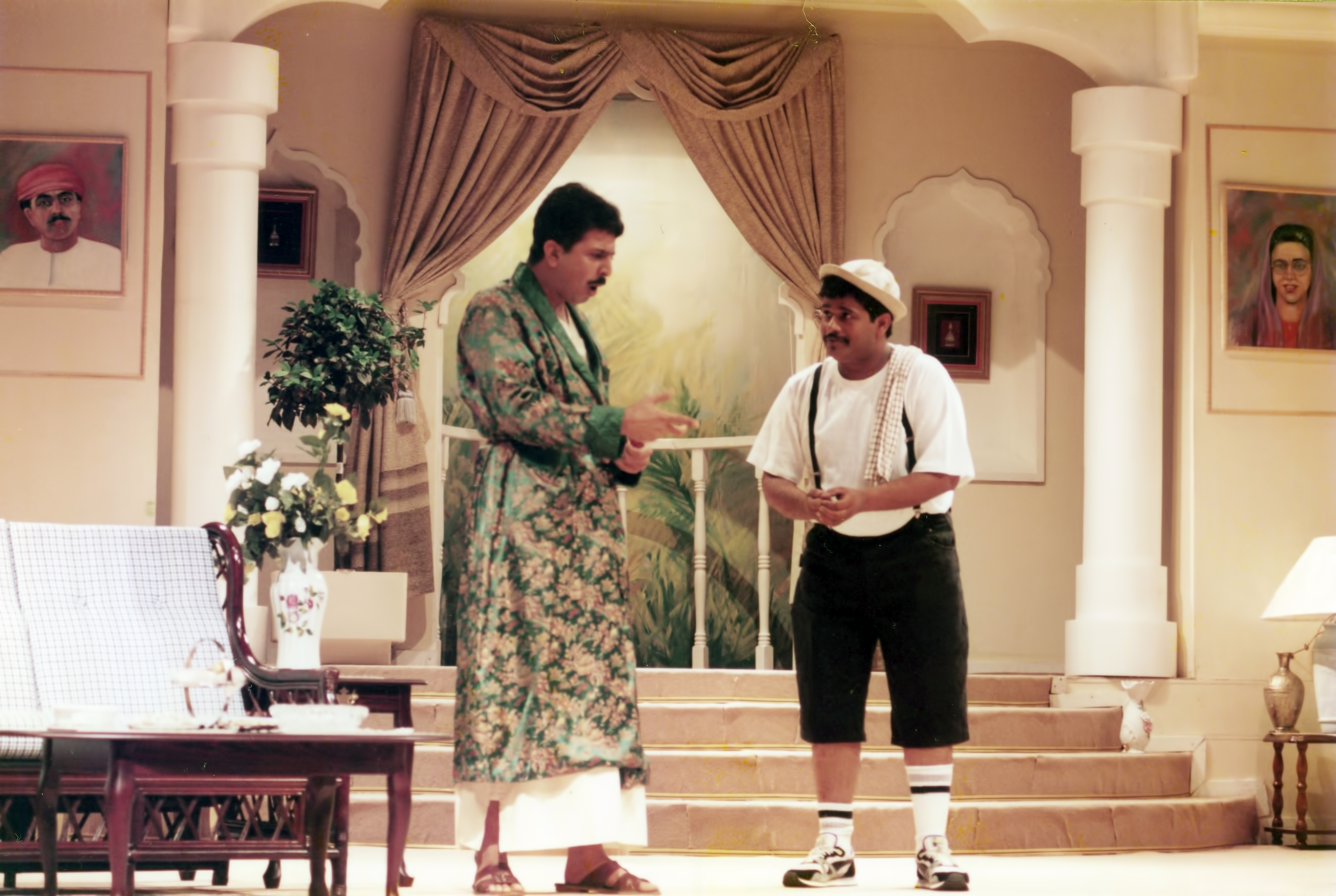
Welcome Dear Grandma

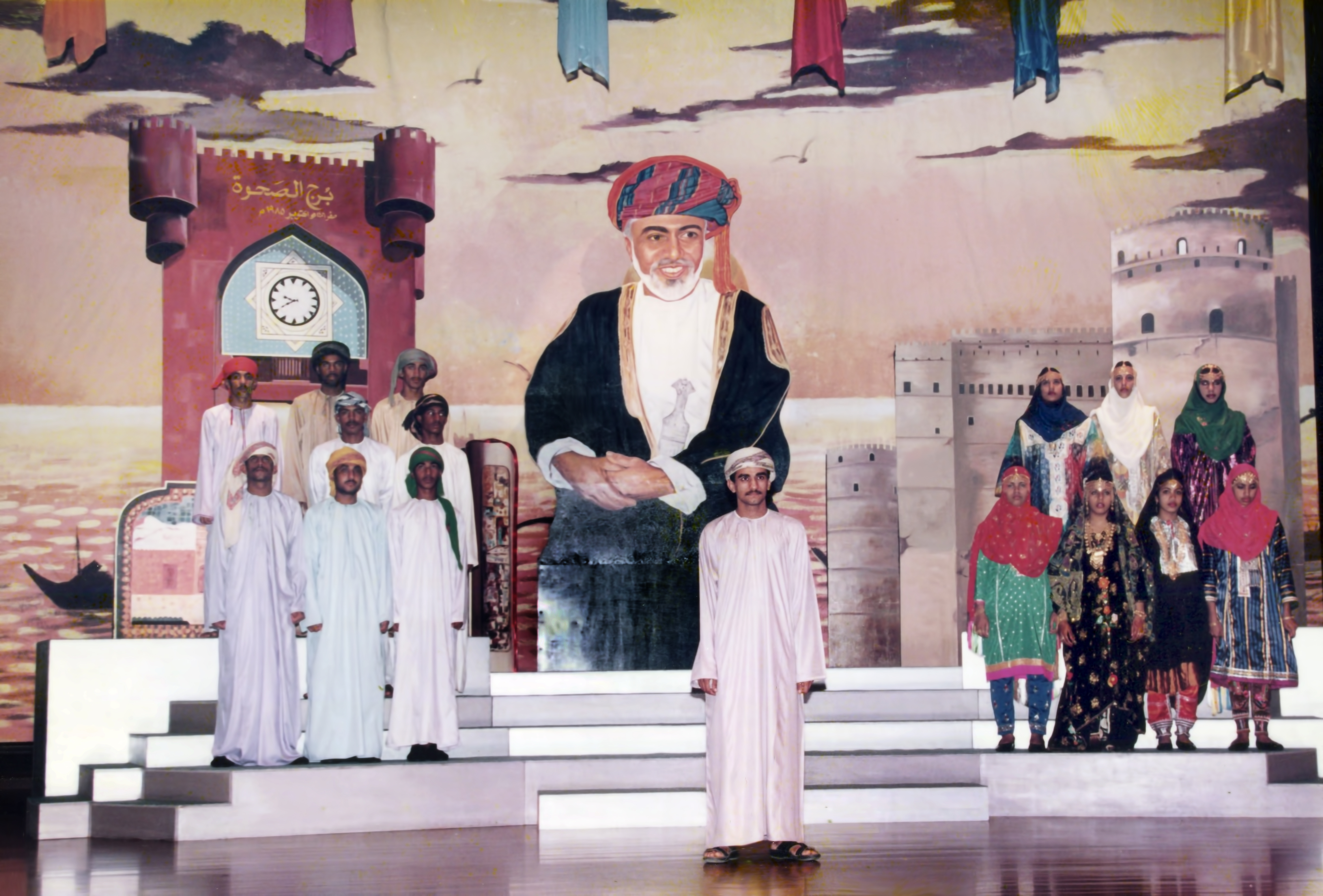
Silver Anniversary

- 1976 - "The Death Song"
- 1981 - "Family of a Fisherman"
- 1982 - “The Homeland”
- 1983 - “The Flag”,
- 1983 - "The Migrating Bird", .
- 1984 - “The Well”,
- 1985 - “The Dowry”,
- 1986 - “The Stranger”,
- 1987 - “The Rat” .
- 1988 - "The Deluded Millionaire" .
- 1988 - “The Knight”,
- 1994 - “Welcome, dear Grandma,”
- 1995 - “Silver Anniversary”,
