= Finborough Theatre =

Theatre in London

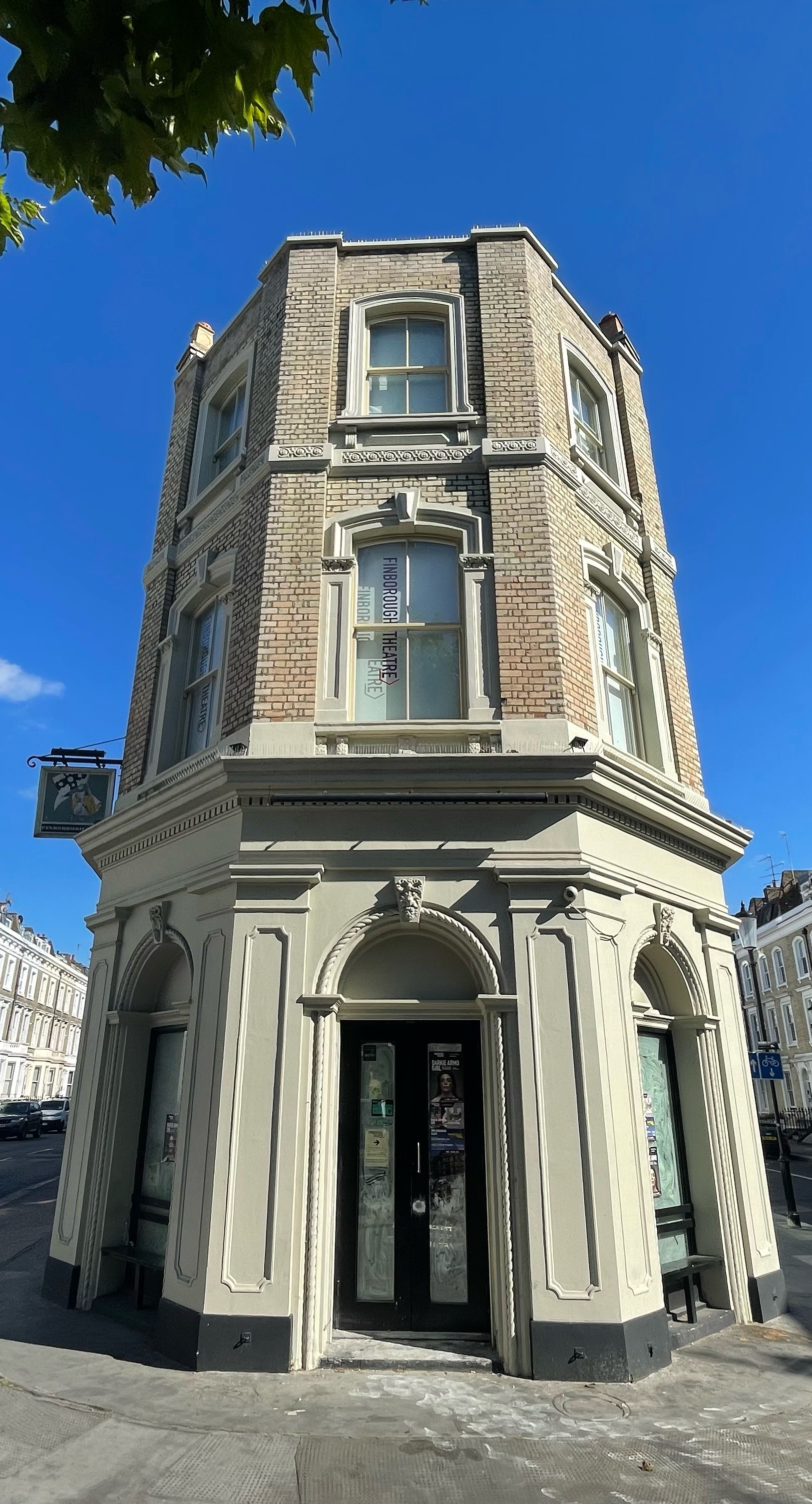
- Interactive map of Finborough Theatre
- Location: West Brompton; London, SW10 9ED; United Kingdom
- Coordinates: 51.486599°N 0.190107°W
- Capacity: 50 seats
- Type: Off-West End theatre
- Current use: Theatre
- Production: Short seasons
- Public transit: Earl's Court West Brompton

Construction
- Opened: 24 June 1980
- Rebuilt: Internal reconstruction, 1983
- Years active: 1980–present
- Architects: George Godwin and Henry Godwin

Website
- www.finboroughtheatre.co.uk

The Finborough Theatre is a fifty-seat theatre in the West Brompton area of London (part of the Royal Borough of Kensington and Chelsea) under artistic director Neil McPherson. The theatre presents new British writing, as well as UK and world premieres of new plays both in translation and from the English speaking world including North America, Canada, Ireland, and Scotland including work in the Scots language, alongside rarely seen rediscovered 19th and 20th century plays. The venue also presents new and rediscovered music theatre.

== The Finborough Arms ==
The Finborough Arms was built in 1868 to a design by George Godwin and his younger brother Henry. It was one of five public houses built by Corbett and McClymont in the Earls Court area during the West London development boom of the 1860s. The pub opened in 1871. The ground floor and basement of the building was converted into The Finborough Road Brasserie from 2008 to 2010 and The Finborough Wine Cafe from 2010 to 2012. The pub reopened under its original name of The Finborough Arms in February 2014 and closed again during the COVID-19 pandemic. It reopened after an extensive refurbishment in January 2025 as a bar and restaurant.

== 1980s ==
June Abbott opened the theatre above the Finborough Arms Public House in June 1980. In its first decade, artists working at the new theatre included Clive Barker, Kathy Burke, Ken Campbell, Mark Rylance, and Claire Dowie who appeared in the world première of her own play Adult Child/Dead Child.

== 1990s ==
From 1991 to 1994, the theatre was best known for new writing with Naomi Wallace’s first play The War Boys; Rachel Weisz in David Farr’s Neville Southall's Washbag, Elton John’s Glasses; Holding Back the Ocean by Godfrey Hamilton; and three plays by Anthony Neilson: The Year of the Family; Normal: The Düsseldorf Ripper; and Penetrator, which transferred from the Traverse and went on to play at the Royal Court Upstairs. From 1994, the theatre was run by The Steam Industry under Artistic Director Phil Willmott. Productions included new plays by Tony Marchant, David Eldridge, Mark Ravenhill, and Phil Willmott. New writing development included Mark Ravenhill's Shopping and F*cking (Royal Court, West End and Broadway) and Naomi Wallace's Slaughter City (Royal Shakespeare Company), the UK première of David Mamet’s The Woods, and Anthony Neilson's The Censor, which transferred to the Royal Court.

== 2000s ==
Productions since 2000 have included the UK premières of Brad Fraser’s Wolfboy; Lanford Wilson’s Sympathetic Magic; Tennessee Williams’ Something Cloudy, Something Clear; and Frank McGuinness’ Gates of Gold with William Gaunt and the late John Bennett in his last stage role which transferred to the West End; the London première of Sonja Linden’s I Have Before Me a Remarkable Document Given to Me by a Young Lady from Rwanda; the specially commissioned adaptation of W.H. Davies’ Young Emma by Laura Wade and directed by Tamara Harvey; the first London revival for more than 40 years of Rolf Hochhuth’s Soldiers; Keith Dewhurst's Lark Rise to Candleford, performed in promenade and in repertoire; the Great War drama Red Night, and five first plays by new writers: Jason Hall's Eyes Catch Fire; Chris Dunkley’s Mirita; Dameon Garnett's Break Away , Simon Vinnicombe's Year 10, Joy Wilkinson's Fair which transferred to the West End; Waterloo Day with Robert Lang; Sarah Phelps’ Modern Dance for Beginners, subsequently produced at the Soho Theatre; Carolyn Scott-Jeffs' comedy Out in the Garden, which transferred to the Assembly Rooms, Edinburgh; the London premiere of Larry Kramer's The Destiny of Me; The Women's War – an evening of original suffragette plays; Steve Hennessy’s Lullabies of Broadmoor (about the Finborough Road murder of 1922); the Victorian era comedy Masks and Faces; Etta Jenks with Clarke Peters and Daniela Nardini; The Gigli Concert with Niall Buggy, Catherine Cusack and Paul McGann which transferred to the Assembly Rooms, Edinburgh); Hortensia and the Museum of Dreams with Linda Bassett, Albert's Boy by James Graham starring Victor Spinetti, Peter Oswald’s Lucifer Saved with Mark Rylance, Blackwater Angel, the UK debut of Irish playwright Jim Nolan with Sean Campion, the first London revival for over seventy years of Loyalties by John Galsworthy, the world premiere of Plague Over England by Nicholas de Jongh which subsequently transferred to the West End at the Duchess Theatre, the first revival of Hangover Square, adapted by Fidelis Morgan from the novel by Patrick Hamilton, the UK premiere of the musical Ordinary Days by Adam Gwon and a season of plays by William Saroyan.

== 2010s ==
In March 2010 the theatre presented the world premiere of A Day at the Racists, a new piece of political theatre by Anders Lustgarten, charting the rise of the BNP in Barking. In 2011 productions included a critically acclaimed production of Mixed Marriage by St John Ervine, as well as Dawn King's Foxfinder, as well as revivals of Emlyn Williams's Accolade and Caryl Churchill's Fen. Air conditioning was also installed in 2011. In 2012 productions at the theatre included John McGrath's Events While Guarding the Bofors Gun and revivals of Arthur Miller's The American Clock and J. B. Priestley's Cornelius which subsequently transferred Off-Broadway. In November 2012, the theatre presented twelve new plays as part of its fourth annual Vibrant – A Festival of Finborough Playwrights. The plays include The Andes by Alexandra Wood, The Sugar-Coated Bullets of the Bourgeoisie by Anders Lustgarten and Pig Girl by Colleen Murphy. 2012 saw transfers of London Wall by John Van Druten to St James' Theatre, and Cornelius by J.B. Priestley to Off-Broadway. From 2009–12, the Finborough Theatre awarded the Leverhulme Emerging Directors Bursary in collaboration with the National Theatre Studio. The recipients of the award were Blanche McIntyre, Ria Parry and Andrea Ferran.

== 2020s ==
Productions in 2020:

7 January – 1 February 2020. Scrounger by Athena Stevens. Directed by Lily McLeish. World premiere.

4 February – 29 February 2020. On McQuillan's Hill by Joe Crilly. Directed by Jonathan Harden. English premiere.

3 March – 15 March 2020. Not Quite Jerusalem by Paul Kember. Directed by Peter Kavanagh. First new UK production in 40 years.

As a result of the COVID-19 pandemic in the United Kingdom, the Finborough Theatre temporarily closed, cancelling its remaining productions for 2020.

From May 2020, the Finborough Theatre began its #FinboroughForFree programme of archive productions streamed online:

7 May – 7 July 2020. It Is Easy To Be Dead by Neil McPherson. Directed by Max Key. World premiere production from 2016.

18 May – 31 December 2021. Continuity by Gerry Moynihan. Directed by Shane Dempsey. World premiere production from 2017.

5 June – 5 August 2020. Jane Clegg by St John Ervine. Directed by David Gilmore. First London production in over 75 years from 2019.

2 July – 2 September 2020. Blueprint Medea by Julia Pascal. Directed by Julia Pascal. World premiere production from 2019.

1 – 3 and 31 August 2020. Scrounger by Athena Stevens. Directed by Lily McLeish. World premiere production from January 2020.

7 September – 7 October 2020. Death of a Hunter by Rolf Hochhuth. Directed by Anthony Shrubsall. UK and English language premiere production from 2018.

1 October – 12 November 2020. Adding Machine (musical) by Jason Loewith and Joshua Schmidt. Directed by Josh Seymour. UK premiere production from 2016.

1 November – 31 December 2020. I Wish To Die Singing – Voices From The Armenian Genocide by Neil McPherson. Directed by Tommo Fowler. World premiere production from 2015.

1 December 2020 – 1 February 2021. S-27 by Sarah Grochala. Directed by Stephen Keyworth. The world premiere of the winner of Amnesty International’s first Protect The Human Playwriting Competition.

From January 2021 the Finborough Theatre began to produce new original online content as part of its #FinboroughForFree programme:

1 February – 30 April 2021. Late Night Staring At High Res Pixels by Athena Stevens. Directed Lily McLeish. The world premiere of a new play repurposed for online viewing.

1 April – 8 April 2021. Playfight by Julia Grogan. Directed by Blanche McIntyre. The world premiere rehearsed reading of the winner of the 2020 ETPEP Competition.

24 May – 20 June 2021. A Brief List of Everyone Who Died by Jacob Marx Rice. Directed by Alex Howarth. The world premiere rehearsed reading.

22 June – 20 July 2021. Leather by Peter Scott-Presland. Directed by Patrick Kealey. The first production in more than thirty years.

28 July – 25 August 2021. Masks and Faces or, Before and Behind the Curtain by Charles Reade and Tom Taylor. Directed by Matthew Iliffe. The online premiere of a unique rediscovery.

In September 2021, the Finborough Theatre reopened for live performances:

28 September – 23 October 2021. How To Survive An Apocalypse by Jordan Hall. Directed by Jimmy Walters. UK premiere production from 2016.

26 October – 20 November 2021. The Sugar House by Alana Valentine. Directed by Tom Brennan. The European Premiere.

23 November – 18 December 2021. Yes So I Said Yes by David Ireland. Directed by Max Elton. The Great Britain premiere.

28 January – 25 February 2022. An Earl's Court Miscellany devised and directed by Catherine Harvey. The online world premiere.

31 January – 28 February 2022. How To Make A Revolution by Einat Weizman with Issa Amro. Directed by Tommo Fowler. The online world premiere.

1 March – 2 April 2022. Bacon by Sophie Swithinbank. Directed by Matthew Iliffe. The world premiere.

19 April – 14 May 2022. The Straw Chair by Sue Glover. Directed by Polly Creed. The English premiere.

17 May – 11 June 2022. Bliss by Fraser Grace. Directed by Paul Bourne. The world premiere.

Online from Monday, 30 May 2022. #FinboroughFrontier: Otvetka by Neda Nezhdana. Translated by John Farndon. The online premiere.

Online from Monday, 6 June 2022. #FinboroughFrontier: The Peed-Upon Armored Personnel Carrier by Oksana Gritsenko. Translated by John Freedman. The online premiere.

Online from Monday, 13 June 2022. #FinboroughFrontier: A Dictionary of Emotions in a Time of War by Yelena Astasyeva. Translated by John Freedman. The online premiere.

14 June - 9 July 2022. Darkie Armo Girl by Karine Bedrossian. Directed by Anastasia Bunce. The world premiere.

Online from Monday, 4 July 2022. #FinboroughFrontier: Stand Up For Ukraine Written and Performed by Bréon Rydell. The online premiere.

9 August - 3 September 2022. Two Ukrainian Plays. Take The Rubbish Out, Sasha by Natal’ya Vorozhbit. Directed by Svetlana Dimcovic. The English Premiere. Pussycat in Memory of Darkness by Neda Nezhdana. Directed by Polly Creed. The first production outside Ukraine.

Online from Monday, 29 August 2022. #FinboroughFrontier: Tatiana Voltskaya Poems by Tatiana Voltskaya. Translated by John Farndon with Larissa Itina. The online premiere.

Online from Thursday, 1 September 2022. #FinboroughFrontier: Director Polly Creed interviews Tetyana Filevska and Karina Sabri.

6 September - 1 October 2022. Distinguished Villa by Kate O'Brien. Directed by Hugh Fraser. The first London production since 1926.

4 October - 29 October 2022. The Coral by Georg Kaiser. Directed by Emily Louizou. The first UK production in 100 years.

1 November - 26 November 2022. Not Now by David Ireland. Directed by Max Elton. The English premiere.

29 November - 21 December 2022. 12:37 by Julia Pascal. Directed by Julia Pascal. The world premiere.

3 January - 28 January 2023. Salt-Water Moon by David French. Directed by Peter Kavanagh. The UK premiere.

31 January - 25 February 2023. One Who Wants To Cross by Marc-Emmanuel Soriano. Directed by Alice Hamilton. The UK premiere.

28 February - 25 March 2023. The Journey To Venice by Bjørg Vik. Directed by Wiebke Green. The UK premiere.

28 March - 22 April 2023. Pussycat in Memory of Darkness by Neda Nezhdana. Directed by Polly Creed.

15 April 2023. Belly of the Beast by Saana Sze. Directed by Lakesha Arie-Angelo.

25 April - 13 May 2023. The Retreat by Jason Sherman. Directed by Emma Jude Harris. European premiere.

15 May - 15 June 2023. An Earl’s Court Miscellany devised and directed by Catherine Harvey. Online world premiere.

16 May - 10 June 2023. A Brief List of Everyone Who Died by Jacob Marx Rice. Directed by Alex Howarth. World premiere.

13 June - 8 July. The Return of Benjamin Lay by Naomi Wallace and Marcus Rediker. Directed by Ron Daniels. World premiere.

11 July – 5 August 2023.The Wind and the Rain by Merton Hodge. Directed by Geoffrey Beevers. The first London production in 80 years.

8 August – 2 September 2023. Makeshifts and Realities. A triple bill of one-act plays featuring Makeshifts and Realities by Gertrude Robins, and Honour Thy Father by H. M. Harwood. The first London productions in more than 100 years. Directed By Melissa Dunne.

5 September - 30 September 2023, Birthright by T. C. Murray. Directed by Scott Hurran. The First London production in over 90 years.

3 October - 28 October 2023, Dead Dad Dog by John McKay (director). Directed by Liz Carruthers. The first London production in 35 years.

31 October - 25 November 2023, Knocking on the Wall by Ena Lamont Stewart. Directed by Finlay Glen. The first UK production in over 35 years.

28 November - 22 December 2023, £1 Thursdays by Kat Rose-Martin. Directed by Vicky Moran. World premiere.

2 January - 28 January 2024, 1979 by Michael Healey. Directed by Jimmy Walters. European premiere.

20 February - 16 March 2024, Jab by James McDermott. Directed by Scott Le Crass. World premiere.

19 March - 13 April 2024, Foam by Harry McDonald. Directed by Matthew Iliffe. World premiere.

16 April - 11 May 2024, Banging Denmark by Van Badham. Directed by Sally Woodcock. European premiere.

14 May - 8 June 2024, The Tailor of Inverness by Matthew Zajac. Directed by Ben Harrison. London premiere.

11 June - 6 July 2024, Kafka by Jack Klaff. Directed by Colin Watkeys. The first London production in over 30 years.

9 July - 3 August 2024, The Trumpeter by Inna Goncharova. Directed by Vladimir Shcherban. UK premiere.

3 September - 28 September 2024, The Silver Cord by Sidney Howard. Directed by Joe Harmston. The first London production for over 95 years.

1 October - 26 October 2024, Beryl Cook: A Private View by Kara Wilson. English Premiere.

29 October - 23 November 2024, Burnt-Up Love by Ché Walker. World premiere.

26 November - 21 December 2024, Lies Where It Falls by Ruairi Conaghan. English premiere.

7 January - 1 February 2025, Belly of the Beast by Saana Sze. Directed by Dadiow Lin. World premiere.

10 February - 15 March 2025, The Passenger by Nadya Menuhin. Directed by Tim Supple. The world premiere of a new adaptation.

18 March - 12 April 2025, Men's Business by Franz Xaver Kroetz, in a new translation by Simon Stephens. Directed by Ross Gaynor. The world premiere of a new translation.

15 April - 10 May 2025, The Inseparables by Grace Joy Howarth. Directed by Anastasia Bunce. The world premiere of a new adaptation.

13 May - 7 June 2025, Diagnosis by Athena Stevens. Directed by Ché Walker. World premiere.

10 June - 5 July 2025, Claire Dowie's Swansong (Four plays for four decades, performed in repertoire)’by Claire Dowie. Directed by Colin Watkeys. World premiere.

9 September - 4 October 2025, The Truth About Blayds by A. A. Milne. Directed by David Gilmore (theatre director). First London Production in over 100 years.

28 October - 22 November 2025, Mr Jones: An Aberfan Story by Liam Holmes. Directed by Michael Neri.

25 November - 7 February 2026, Darkie Armo Girl by Karine Bedrossian. Directed by Anastasia Bunce. World premiere.

10 February - 7 March 2026, 1.17am, or until the words run out by Zoe Hunter Gordon. Directed by Sarah Stacey. World premiere.

24 March - 19 April 2026, The Old Ladies by Rodney Ackland, based on the novel by Hugh Walpole. Directed by Brigid Larmour. First London production in over 30 years.

5 May - 30 May 2026, Foal by Titas Halder. Directed by Annie Kershaw. World premiere.

10 June - 4 July 2026, Soldiers of Tomorrow by Itai Erdal with Colleen Murphy. Directed by Anita Rochon. The English Premiere.

14 July - 1 August 2026, Local by Liz Richardson. Directed by Amy Hailwood. The London Premiere.

2 September - 26 September 2026, Annie Wobbler (Revisited) by Arnold Wesker. The 45th Anniversary Production.

== Musical theatre ==
The Finborough Theatre has also presented musical theatre, including Schwartz It All About which transferred to Edinburgh and the King's Head Theatre, the world premiere of Charles Miller and Kevin Hammonds' When Midnight Strikes, the UK premieres of Lucky Nurse and Other Short Musical Plays by Michael John LaChuisa, Darius Milhaud’s opera Médée, Myths and Hymns by Adam Guettel, John and Jen by Andrew Lippa and Three Sides by Grant Olding, and an acclaimed series 'Celebrating British Musical Theatre' from the Victorian and Edwardian era with Florodora, Our Miss Gibbs, The Maid of the Mountains and A Gilbert and Sullivan Doublebill featuring Sweethearts, a play by W.S. Gilbert, The Zoo, an operetta by Arthur Sullivan and Bolton Rowe, the opera The Boatswain's Mate by Ethel Smyth and two rare musicals by Rodgers and Hammerstein – the UK premiere of State Fair which transferred to the West End, and the European premiere of Me and Juliet.

== Awards ==
The Finborough Theatre has won the Pearson Award bursary for playwrights nine times for Chris Lee in 2000, Laura Wade in 2005, James Graham in 2006, Al Smith in 2007, Anders Lustgarten in 2009, Simon Vinnicombe in 2010, Dawn King in 2011, Shamser Sinha in 2013 and Chris Thompson in 2014 – as well as the Pearson Award for Best Play for Laura Wade in 2005 and – under its new name – the Catherine Johnson Best Play Award in 2007 for James Graham and for Anders Lustgarten in 2010. Anders Lustgarten also won the inaugural Harold Pinter Playwrights Award for the same play, A Day at the Racists, in 2011.

The Finborough Theatre won the Empty Space Peter Brook Award in 2010 and for a second time in 2012. It was also the inaugural winner of the Empty Space Peter Brook Award's Dan Crawford Pub Theatre Award in 2005 which it also won again in 2008. It has also won the Empty Space Peter Brook Mark Marvin Award in 2004 . The Finborough Theatre received four 2011 Offies, and at the 2012 Offies, the Finborough Theatre received eight Offies for, among others, Best Artistic Director, a consecutive Best Director, Best Production, Best Male Performance and Most Promising New Playwright.

The Finborough Theatre was awarded The Stage 100's inaugural Fringe Theatre of the Year award in 2011.

Neil McPherson was named as Best Artistic Director in the 2009 Fringe Report Awards and both the 2011 and 2012 Offies, and won an award for the Encouragement of New Writing from the Writers Guild of Great Britain in 2010.

== Artistic directors ==
- June Abbott (1980–1982)
- Mike McCormack (1982–1988)
- Jessica Dromgoole (1988–1991)
- Cathryn Horn and Mary Peate (1991–1994)
- Phil Willmott (1994–1999)
- Neil McPherson (1999–)
