= HighTide =

- Address: Box Office: Aldeburgh Cinema, 51 High Street, IP15 5AU; Aldeburgh, Suffolk

Website
- www.hightide.org.uk

HighTide is a theatre company based in Aldeburgh, Suffolk. It is one of the UK’s leading producers of new plays, and the only professional theatre company focused on the production of new playwrights. The company produces around six new productions each year which tour the UK's leading theatres and internationally.

== About ==
Under Artistic Director Steven Atkinson, HighTide have premièred major productions by playwrights including Ella Hickson, Frances Ya-Chu Cowhig, Nick Payne, Adam Brace, Beth Steel, Laura Poliakoff, Luke Barnes, Vickie Donoghue, Lydia Adetunji, Jack Thorne and Joel Horwood.

Lansons, a public relations agency, host HighTide's administrative offices in-kind within their Clerkenwell offices. This innovative partnership between a business and charity has won five Corporate Engagement Awards (2012 & 2011), was nominated for two Arts & Business awards in 2010 and 2013, and has been profiled by The Guardian and the Evening Standard.

HighTide is a National Portfolio Organisation of Arts Council England.

== History ==
HighTide started life as a three-day festival, opening on 6 March 2007. It premiered short plays by Tom Basden, Steven Bloomer, Sarah Cuddon, Sam Holcroft, Matthew Morrison, Pericles Snowdon, Megan Walsh and Iain Weatherby.
