= Hugo Hansén =

Swedish theatre director

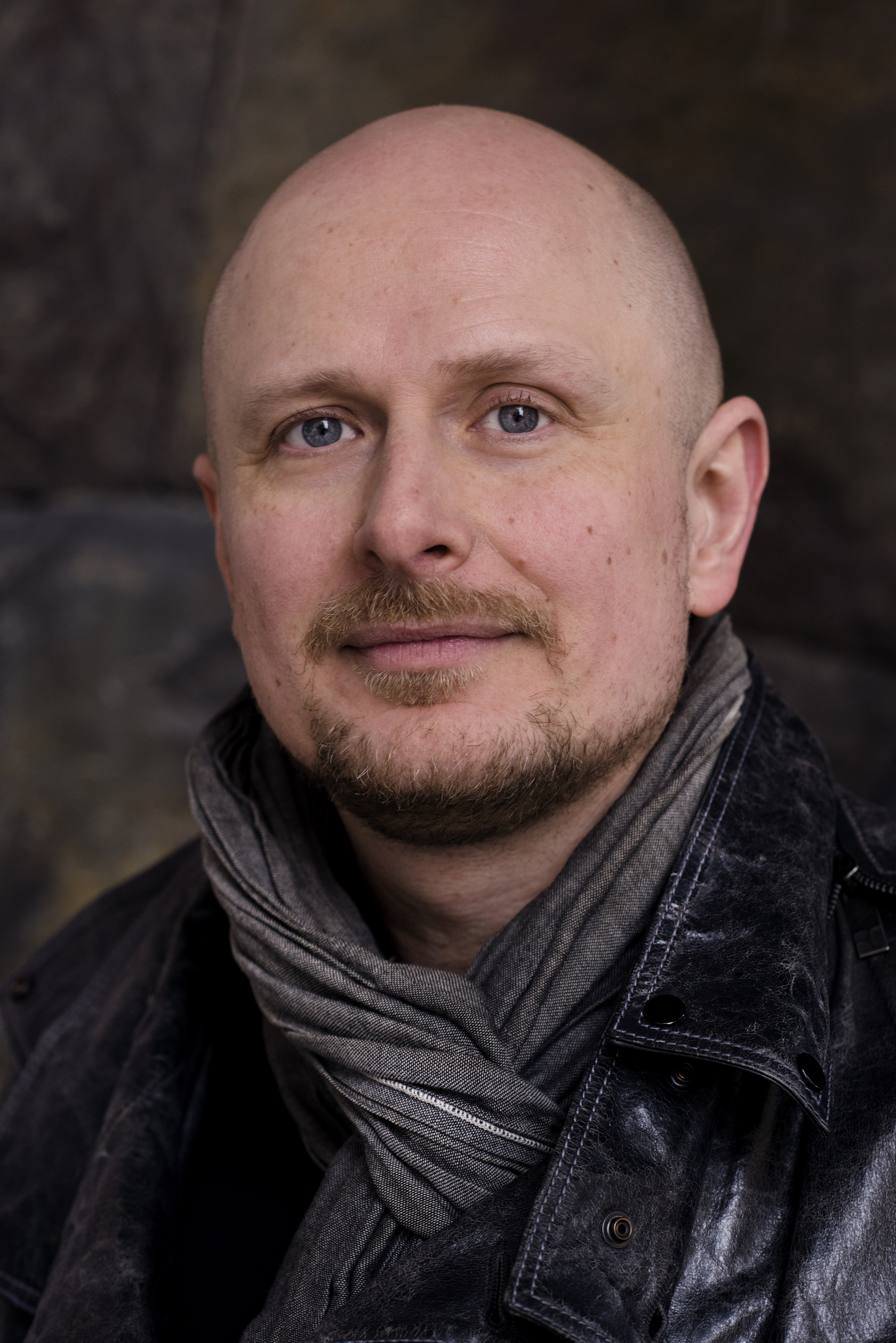
Hansén in 2014

Claes Hugo Hansén (born 26 December 1972) a Swedish theatre director, currently employed by the Stockholm City Theatre.

== Productions ==
- The Testament of Mary (Marias Testamente), Stockholm City Theatre 2013
- Demons (Demoner), Stockholm City Theatre 2013
- Natascha Kampusch, Stockholm City Theatre 2012
- Persona, Stockholm City Theatre 2011
- On Golden Pond (Sista Sommaren), Stockholm City Theatre 2010
- Red and Green (Rött och Grönt), Stockholm City Theatre 2010
- Shopping and F***ing, Stockholm City Theatre 2009
- Augenlicht (Skimmer), Malmö City Theatre 2009
- I'm feeling much better now (Nu mår jag mycket bättre), Stockholm City Theatre 2009
- Five times God (Fem gånger Gud), Stockholm City Theatre 2008
- The bitter tears of Petra von Kant (Petra von Kants bittra tårar), Stockholm City Theatre 2008
- The New Trial (Nya Processen), Stockholm City Theatre 2007
- Kränk, Stockholm City Theatre 2006
- Miss Julie (Fröken Julie), Gotlands nation 2000
