= Stephen Kennedy Murphy =

- Born: Stephen Kennedy Murphy

Stephen Kennedy Murphy is a stage director of theatre and opera. He is the founding artistic director of the Eugene O'Neill Studio at Yale and the artistic director of The Playwrights Theater of New York, an organization that is producing O'Neill's complete canon chronologically on stage and on screen. The series has a completion date of December 10, 2036, the 100th anniversary of O'Neill winning the Nobel Prize for Literature.

Murphy is founder of the Eugene O'Neill Festival in New York City in which the stage performances take place. Festival highlights include appearances by Liam Neeson and Al Pacino.

He staged the first productions of two O'Neill plays, Bread and Butter and The Personal Equation (with Ralph Waite).

Murphy began his work on Eugene O'Neill's plays as a researcher for Arthur and Barbara Gelb, pre-eminent biographers of O'Neill and producing an event at Broadway's Roundabout Theater for which Murphy read special remarks written by Arthur Miller featuring Mrs. Gelb, Julie Harris, Philip Bosco, Allison Janney and Peter Gallagher.

He is currently building a new wing of The O'Neill Studio at Columbia University. He is also a director of opera, a career begun with a production of Madama Butterfly at Los Angeles Opera starring tenor Placido Domingo.

He is a former member of the directing staff of New York City Opera. He currently directs opera at Columbia University, where he has worked on opera projects since 2011 and trained with Frank Corsaro at The Actors Studio and the Juilliard School, where he has staged performances at Alice Tully Hall, including his adaptation of Stravinsky's The Soldier's Tale.

He teaches acting at The O'Neill Studio. Notable students include Lortel Award Honoree Tracee Chimo (Bad Jews) and Kristoffer Polaha (Mad Men, Life Unexpected).
