= Katja Restović =

Katja Restovic
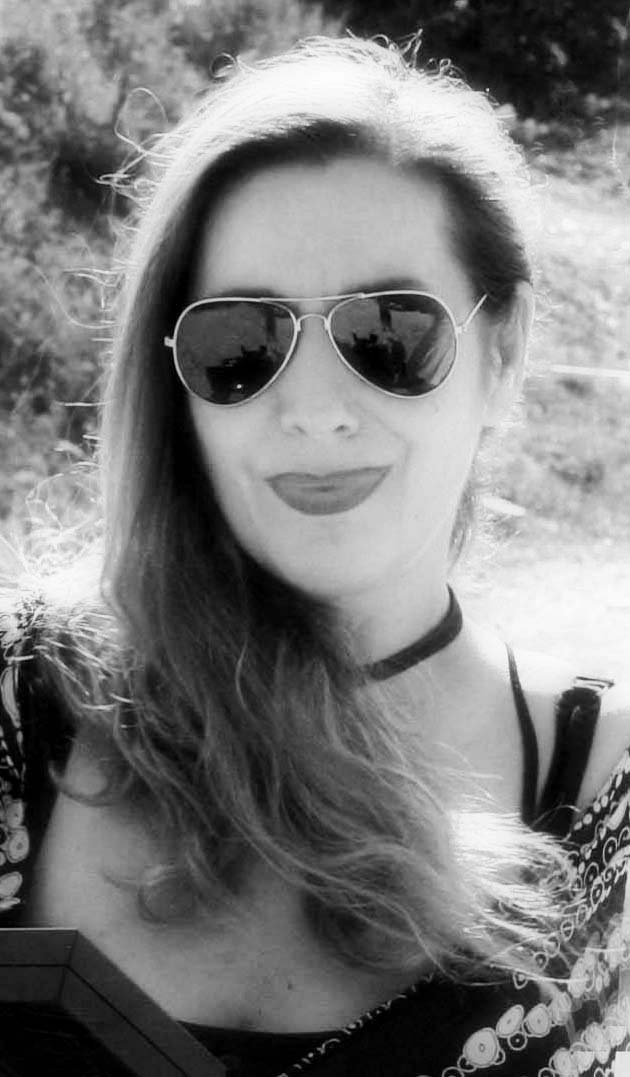
- Born: January 11, 1964 (age 62); Rijeka, Croatia
- Other name: Eva Lucas
- Occupations: Director; Screenwriter; Editor
- Years active: 1998–present
- Website: www.katjarestovic.com

Katja Restovic (11 January 1964) Croatian theatre, movie and music video director.

== Biography ==
From 1988 she is a graduate sculpture (mentor sculptor Josip Diminić) and fashion photography in the class of Visual Communications at University of Rijeka. 1998 it ends Imaginary Film akademiju Groznjan class Rajko Grlić, Karpo Godina and Nenad Puhoski where she signs Documentary “Masayuki Nagase” and became a member of Factum Documentary Film Project the most important Croatian independent documentary production. She also won the Award for painting from the show of art and creativity of Young Pazin and “ Grisia” 1986, Rovinj, and had several solo exhibitions. Also, Katja Restović is the author of the official uniforms for the European campaign of Tourism, Ministry of Tourism and the Croatian carnival masks ( City Rijeka) called "Moretto".

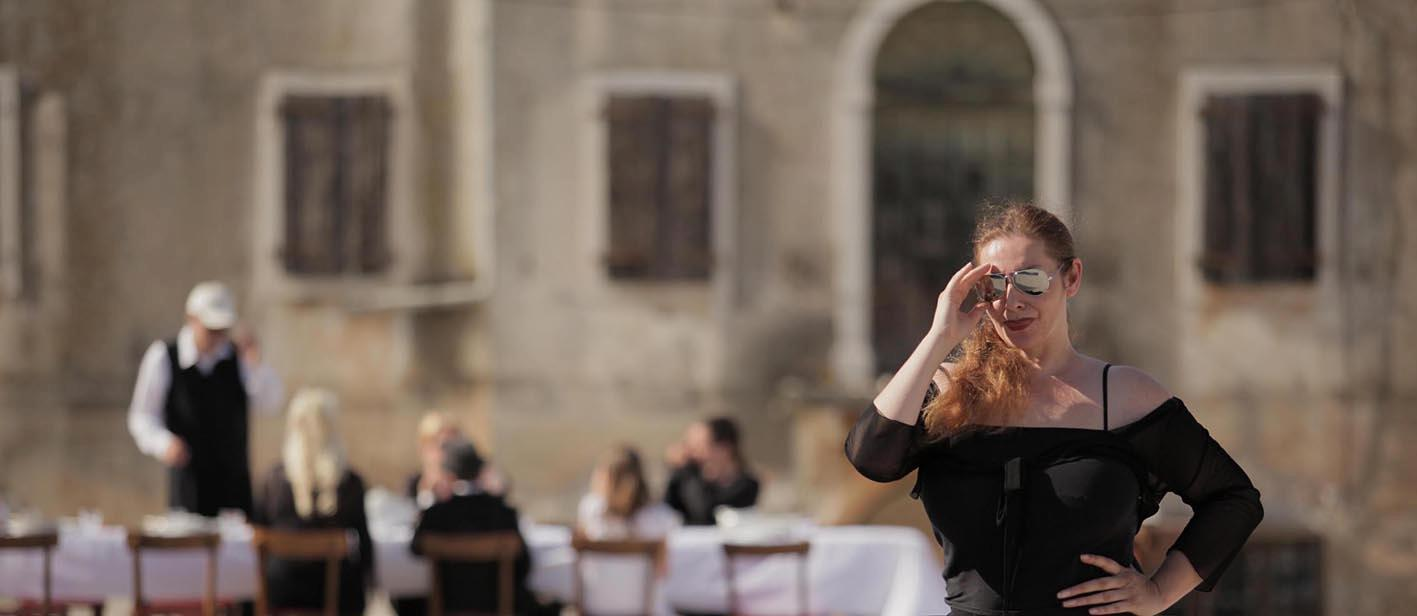
Katja Restović

She is a member of the Croatian Musicians Union, the Croatian Writers' Association and the Association of Croatian film director. She received the Award for Lifetime achievement in the field of fashion, Faculty of Textile Technology in Zagreb (author and director of the Festival Fashion News 1990 -1997). Under the pseudonym Eva Lucas, she has published three novels ( “Pan American Highway”,“Placida Curato” and “Henry Tool’s Film”). Since the Year 2010. she is actively involved in Theater, writing and directing ( Musicals "We are all the same (under the skin") and “The Princess and the Pea", "Na Brzaka" and "Night of Theatre" Katja Restović is founder of Photo Biennale "Photodistrozija" and Festival of comedy called " Zlatni Zub" from 2007. As a director, screenwriter and editor she has written more than 1200 video music videos (HR / BH / SLO / US / I / A) . 2012 became a member of the Association of Istrian photographer and she actively exhibits in the country and abroad, his photographic works. She also attended the Libertas Film Festival with a short documentary film "Maria Bakker". 2012 she finished directing and editing a short film ""The mouth of Evil"" and short documentary „ Followers of Crist gospel choir“, „ EARL BYNUM & AS WE ARE feat. CORA ARMSTRONG“, „Jovan Kolunđija“. From 2012 She is in preparation for feature film "The doors of redemption," which is co-author and director.

== Filmography ==
- Masayuki Nagase (1998.)
- Followers of Christ (2011.)
- Jovan Kolunđija (2011.)
- Ušće zla (2011.)
