= Stephen Shank =

Stephen Shank is a director, actor, writer, set designer and artist who has worked in theatre and television. He was born of American parents in Brussels, Belgium, where he currently lives. He is bilingual in English and French.

In July 2011, he will be directing the stage world premiere of Umberto Eco's The Name of the Rose in the ruins of the Cistercian Abbey of Villers-la-Ville, Belgium (see Villers Abbey).

== Work ==
=== Stage ===
==== Director ====
Year	Title/Author	Location/Theatre	Notes
2011	Les Miserables, Victor Hugo	Butte du Lion de Waterloo	
2011	The Name of the Rose, Umberto Eco	Abbey of Villers-la-ville	
2005–2011	Voilà, Stephen Shank		
2007	Passionnément Anna Magdalena, Anna Magdalena Bach		
2007	Le Flamand aux longues Oreilles, David Sheinert	Théâtre du Méridien	
2006	La Tentation, Hugo Claus	Théâtre du Méridien	
2006	La ballade du Grand Macabre, Michel de Ghelderode	Abbey of Villers-la-ville, Théâtre Royal des Galeries, Festival de Théâtre de Spa, Atelier Théâtre Jean Vilar – Aula Magna	
2005	Saint Julien l'Hospitalier, Gustave Flaubert	Théâtre du Méridien	
2005	La Tempête, William Shakespeare	Théâtre du Méridien	
2004	Le Judgement, Barry Collins	Théâtre du Méridien	
2003	Le Roi se meurt, Eugène Ionesco	Théâtre du Méridien	
2002	Les Misérables, Victor Hugo	Abbey of Villers-la-ville	
2002	Le Contrat, Mrozek	Théâtre Le Public	
2001	La Reine Margot, Alexandre Dumas	Abbey of Villers-la-ville	
1998	Images de la vie de Saint François d'Assise, Michel de Ghelderode.	Abbey of Villers-la-ville	
1998	Mademoiselle Jaïre, Michel de Ghelderode.	Théâtre royal du Parc	
1992	Ceci n'est vraiment pas un déjeuner sur l'herbe, Peter Valley		

==== Actor ====
Year	Title	Role	Notes
2005–2011	Voilà	Jacques	
2004	Le Judgement	Voukov	
2003	Le Roi se meurt	The doctor	
2001	Couple ouvert à deux battants	The man	
1998	Hernani	Don Ricardo	
1998	Angelo Tyrant of Padoue	Homodeï	
1997	Adorable Julia	Jean Paul Fernois	
1997	La Nonna	Carmelo	
1996	Barabbas	Pilate	
1996	Boule de Suif	The Lieutenant von Stauffenberg	
1995	Pinocchio	The Cricket	
1994	Hamlet	Horatio	
1993	Verres	Him	
1992	Ceci n'est vraiment pas un déjeuner sur l'herbe	The son	
1991–1992	Revelation	John	
