= Laurence Olivier Award for Best Actress in a Supporting Role =

Annual award for London theatre

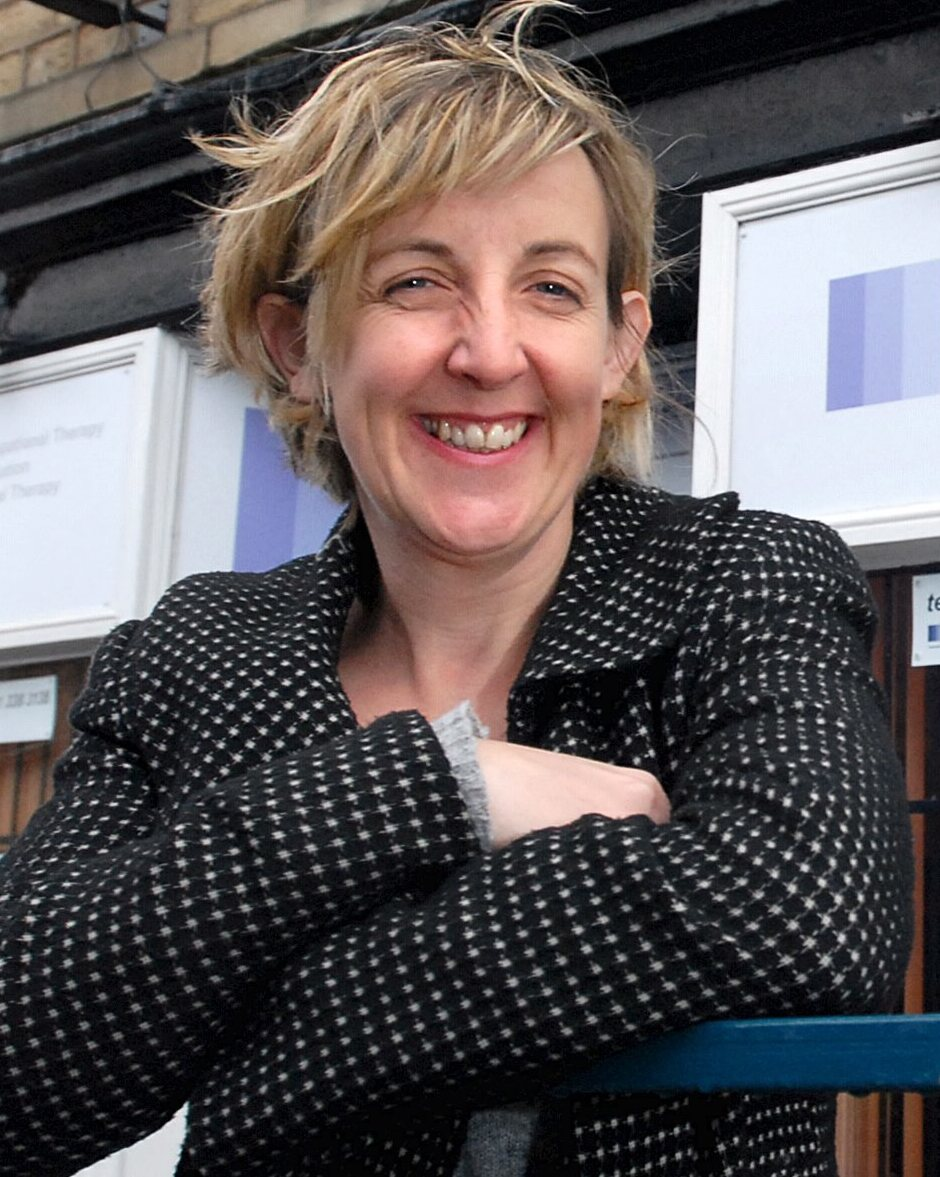
- 2026 Recipient: Julie Hesmondhalgh
- Awarded for: Best Actress in a Supporting Role
- Location: England
- Presented by: Society of London Theatre
- First award: 1977
- Currently held by: Julie Hesmondhalgh for Punch (2026)
- Website: officiallondontheatre.com/olivier-awards/

The Laurence Olivier Award for Best Actress in a Supporting Role is an annual award presented by the Society of London Theatre in recognition of the "world-class status of London theatre." The Oliviers were established as the Society of West End Theatre Awards in 1976, and renamed in 1984 in honour of English actor and director Laurence Olivier.

This award was first given in 1977, then was replaced in 1985 by the commingled actor/actress Best Performance in a Supporting Role, which replaced the 1977 to 1984 pair of Best Actress in a Supporting Role and Best Actor in a Supporting Role awards.

From 1991 to 2012, the general supporting category vacillated at random between the commingled singular award (presented for 12 different seasons) and the pair of awards (presented for the other 11 seasons); the commingled award was last given in 2012, and the split pair of Best Actor and Best Actress awards have been presented every year since.

Angela Lansbury is the oldest recipient of this award when she won at the age of 89 for her role as Madame Arcati in the revival of Noël Coward's comedy play Blithe Spirit in 2015. The following year Judi Dench won at the age of the age of 81 for her role as Paulina in the William Shakespeare revival The Winter's Tale in 2016. Romola Garai was nominated twice the same year in the same category for her roles as Annie in The Years and Jessica Stone in Giant winning for the former at the 2025 Laurence Olivier Awards.

== Winners and nominees ==
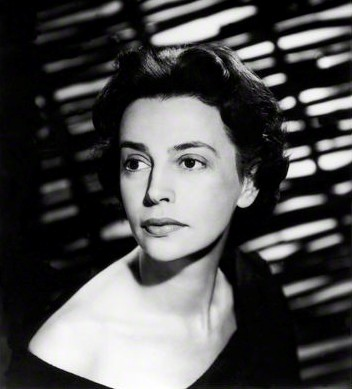
Gwen Watford won for Present Laughter (1981)

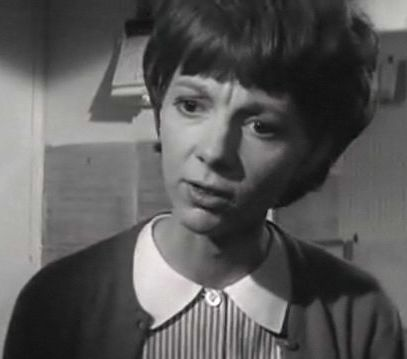
Anna Massey won for The Importance of Being Earnest (1982)

=== 1970s ===
Year	Actress	Play	Character
1977
1977	Mona Washbourne	Stevie	Aunt
1977	Constance Chapman	Just Between Ourselves	Marjorie
1977	Anna Manahan	The Plough and the Stars	Bessie
1977	Elizabeth Spriggs	Volpone	Lady Would-Be
1978
1978	Elizabeth Spriggs	Love Letters on Blue Paper	Sonia Marsden
1978	Brenda Bruce	The Lady's Not for Burning	Alizon Eliot
1978	Susan Fleetwood	The Woman	Ismene
1978	Patricia Hayes	Filumena	Rosalia
1979
1979	Doreen Mantle	Death of a Salesman	Linda
1979	Carmen du Sautoy	Once in a Lifetime	Miss Leighton
1979	Alison Fiske	For Services Rendered	Evie
1979	Patricia Routledge	And a Nightingale Sang	Peggy Stott

=== 1980s ===
Year	Actress	Play	Character
1980
1980	Suzanne Bertish	The Life and Adventures of Nicholas Nickleby	Fanny Squeers
1980	Lynn Dearth	The Greeks	Electra
1980	Prunella Scales	Make and Break	Mrs. Rogers
1980	Susan Tracy	Three Sisters	Natalya Ivanova
1981
1981	Gwen Watford	Present Laughter	Monica Reed
1981	Brenda Bruce	Romeo and Juliet	Nurse
1981	Sinéad Cusack	As You Like It	Celia
1981	Gwen Taylor	Hamlet	Gertrude
1982
1982	Anna Massey	The Importance of Being Earnest	Miss Prism
1982	Nicola Blackman	Destry Rides Again	Clara
1982	Sheila Hancock	The Winter's Tale	Paulina
1982	Carole Hayman	Top Girls	Dull Gret
1983
1983	Abigail McKern	As You Like It	Celia
1983	Kate Buffery	Daisy Pulls It Off	Clare Beaumont
1983	Sylvia Coleridge	Clay	Em
1983	Barbara Leigh-Hunt	Pack of Lies	Helen Kroger
1984
1984	Marcia Warren	Stepping Out	Vera
1984	Clare Higgins	A Streetcar Named Desire	Stella Kowalski
1984	Sophie MgCina	Poppie Nongena	Poppie's Mother
1984	Zoë Wanamaker	The Time of Your Life	Kitty Duval

=== 1990s ===
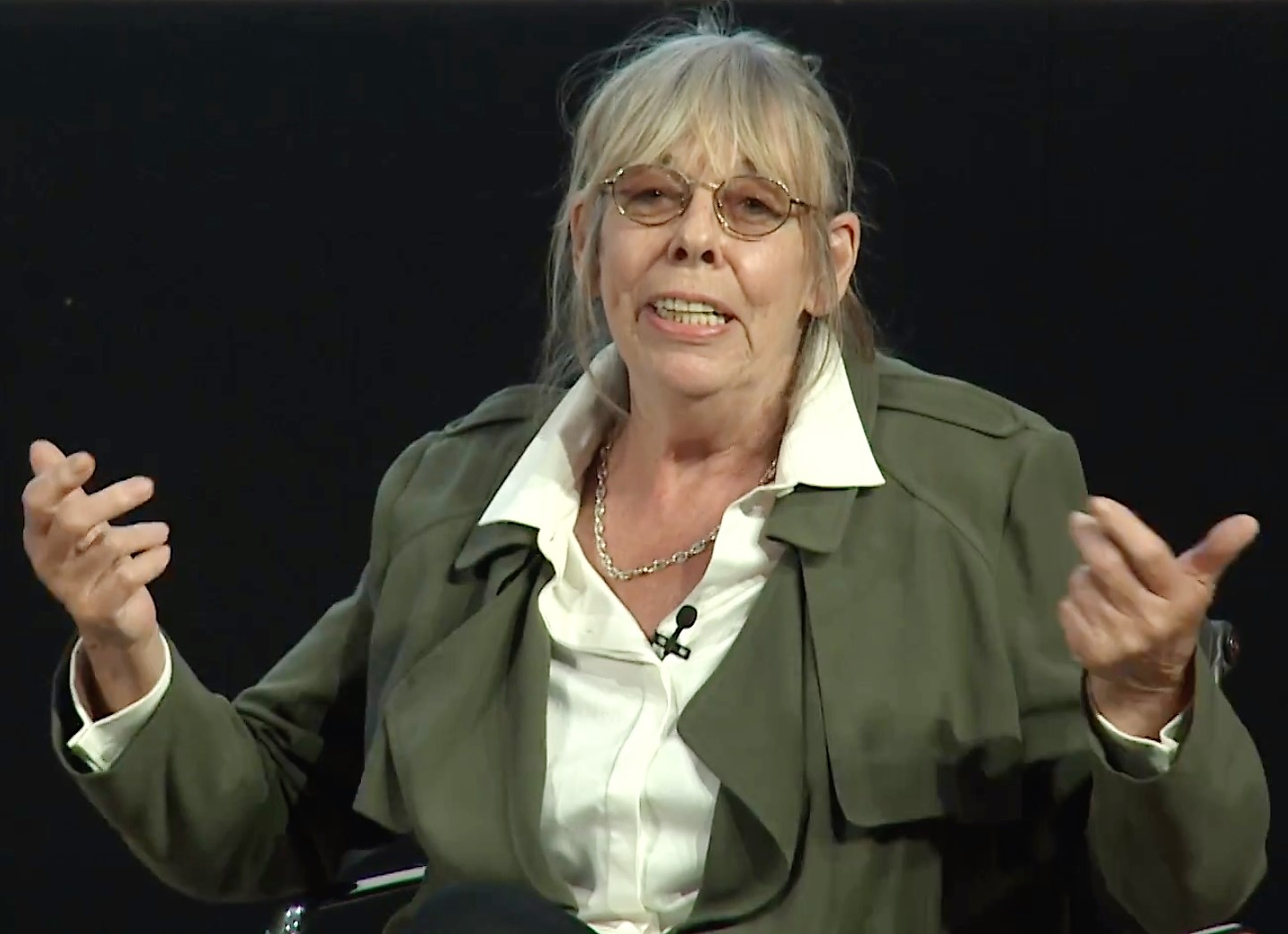
Frances de la Tour won for When She Danced (1991)

Year	Actress	Play	Character
1991
1991	Sara Crowe	Private Lives	Sybil
1991	Maria Miles	The Wild Duck	Hedvig
1991	Anita Reeves	Dancing at Lughnasa	Maggie
1991	Zoë Wanamaker	The Crucible	Elizabeth Proctor
1992
1992	Frances de la Tour	When She Danced	Miss Belzer
1992	Eileen Atkins	The Night of the Iguana	Hannah
1992	Clare Higgins	Napoli milionaria	Amalia Jovine
1992	Lesley Sharp	Uncle Vanya	Sonya
1993
1993	Barbara Leigh-Hunt	An Inspector Calls	Sybil Birling
1993	Annette Badland	The Rise and Fall of Little Voice	Sadie
1993	Elizabeth Bradley	Billy Liar	Florence Boothroyd
1993	Rosemary Harris	Lost in Yonkers	Grandma Kurnitz
1994
1994	Helen Burns	The Last Yankee	Karen Frick
1994	Rosemary Leach	Separate Tables	Mrs Railton-Bell
1994	Sandy McDade	The Life of Stuff	Janice
1994	Sophie Thompson	Wildest Dreams	Marcie Banks
1995
1995	Dora Bryan	The Birthday Party	Meg
1995	Samantha Bond	Le Cid	Infanta
1995	Brid Brennan	Rutherford and Son	Janet
1995	Kathryn Hunter	Pericles, Prince of Tyre	Master of Play
1997
1997	Deborah Findlay	Stanley	Hilda
1997	Frances Barber	Uncle Vanya	Sonya
1997	Anna Chancellor	Stanley	Patricia
1997	Clare Holman	Who's Afraid of Virginia Woolf?	Honey

=== 2000s ===
Year	Actress	Play	Character
2000
2000	Patricia Hodge	Money	Lady Franklin
2000	Anne-Marie Duff	Collected Stories	Lisa
2000	Estelle Kohler	The Winter's Tale	Paulina
2000	Kika Markham	A Song at Twilight	Hilde
2001
2001	Pauline Flanagan	Dolly West's Kitchen	Rima West
2001	Gillian Barge	Passion Play	Agnes
2001	Catherine McCormack	All My Sons	Ann
2001	Marcia Warren	In Flame	Annie / Gramma
2002
2002	Marcia Warren	Humble Boy	Mercy Lott
2002	Brid Brennan	The Little Foxes	Birdie
2002	Emma Fielding	Private Lives	Sibyl
2002	Lyndsey Marshal	Boston Marriage	Catherine

=== 2010s ===
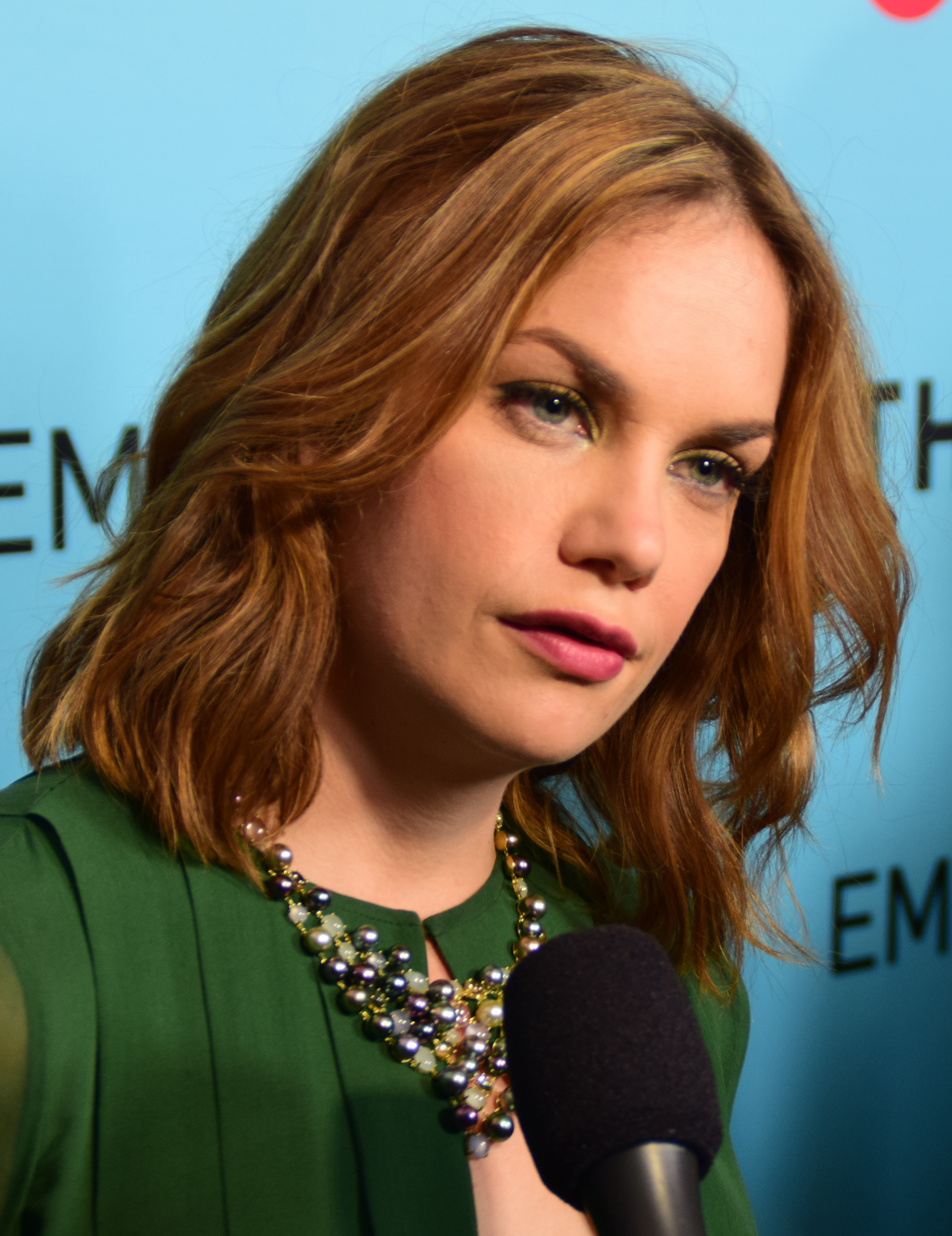
Ruth Wilson won for A Streetcar Named Desire (2010)

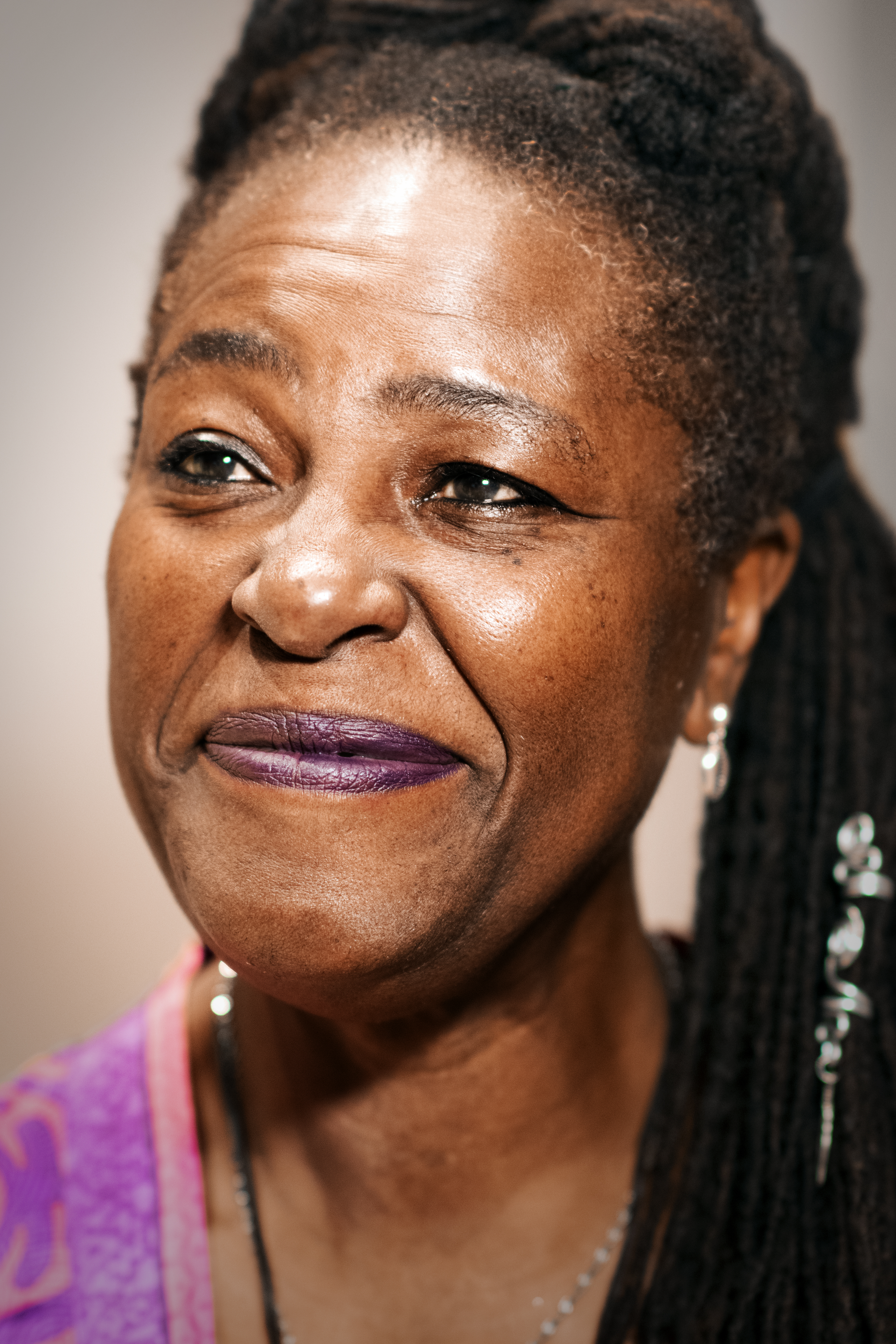
Sharon D. Clarke won for The Amen Corner (2014)

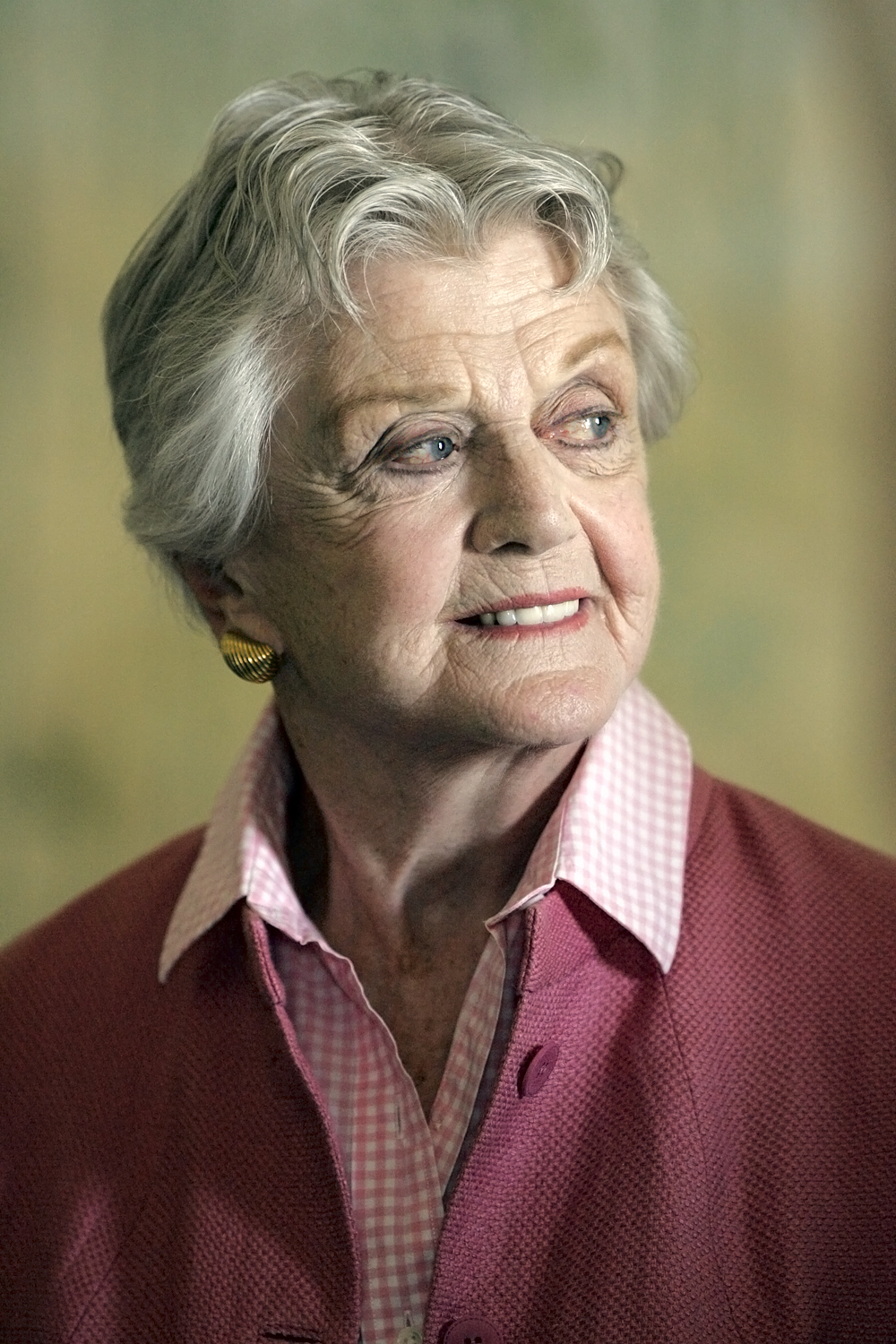
Angela Lansbury won for Blithe Spirit (2015)

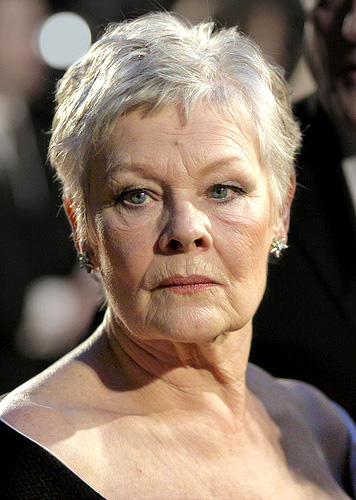
Judi Dench won for The Winter's Tale (2016)

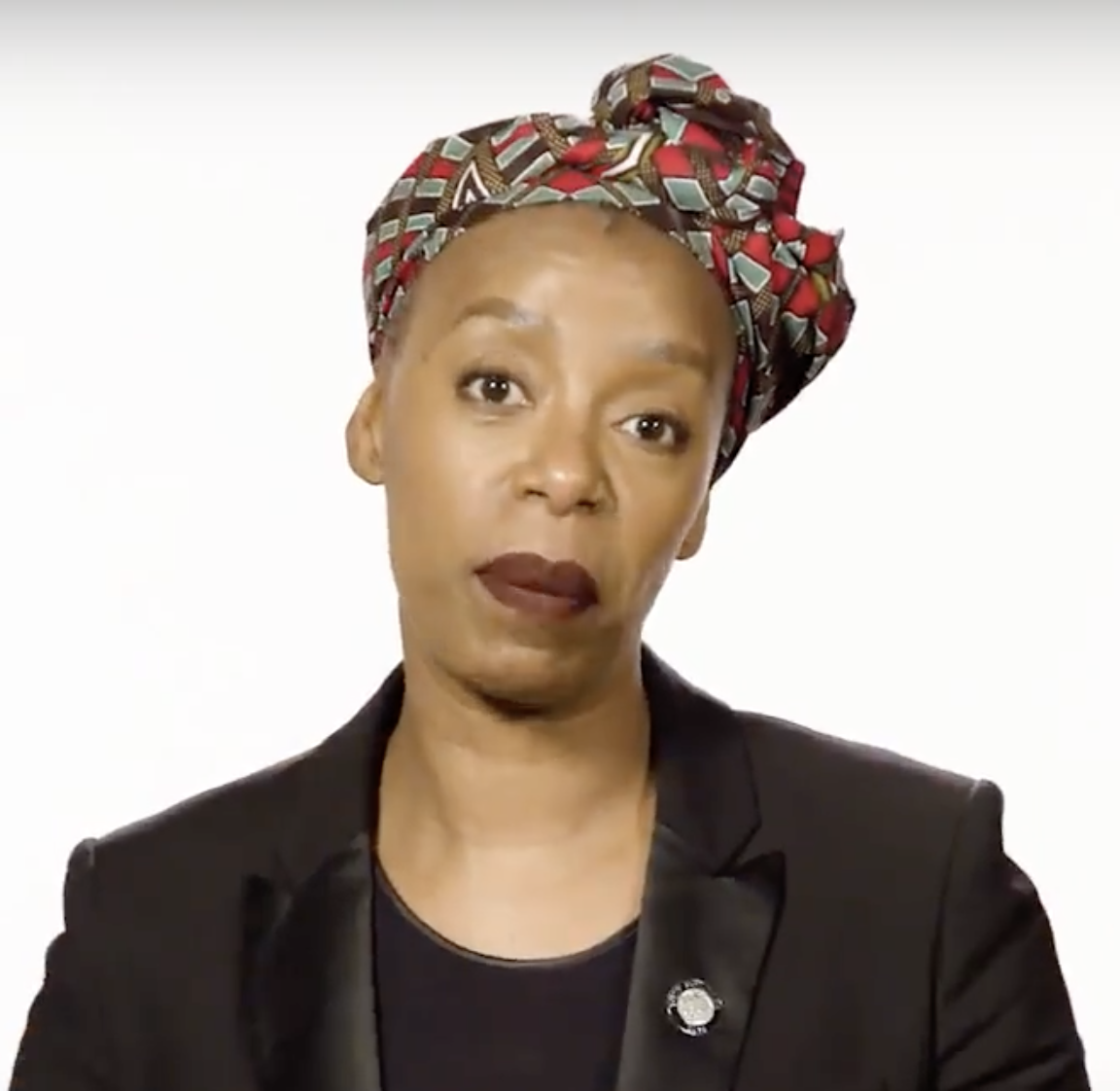
Noma Dumezweni won for Harry Potter and the Cursed Child (2017)

Year	Actress	Play	Character
2010
2010	Ruth Wilson	A Streetcar Named Desire	Stella Kowalski
2010	Hayley Atwell	A View from the Bridge	Catherine Carbone
2010	Michelle Dockery	Burnt by the Sun	Maroussia
2010	Alexandra Gilbreath	Twelfth Night	Olivia
2010	Keira Knightley	The Misanthrope	Jennifer / Célimène
2010	Rachael Stirling	The Priory	Rebecca
2011
2011	Michelle Terry	Tribes	Sylvia
2011	Sarah Goldberg	Clybourne Park	Betsy / Lindsey
2011	Anastasia Hille	The Master Builder	Aline Solness
2011	Gina McKee	King Lear	Goneril
2011	Rachael Stirling	An Ideal Husband	Lady Chiltern
2013
2013	Nicola Walker	The Curious Incident of the Dog in the Night-Time	Judy
2013	Janie Dee	NSFW	Miranda
2013	Anastasia Hille	The Effect	Dr. Lorna
2013	Cush Jumbo	Julius Caesar	Mark Antony
2013	Helen McCrory	The Last of the Haussmans	Libby
2014
2014	Sharon D. Clarke	The Amen Corner	Odessa
2014	Sarah Greene	The Cripple of Inishmaan	Slippy Helen
2014	Katherine Kingsley	A Midsummer Night's Dream	Helena
2014	Cecilia Noble	The Amen Corner	Sister Moore
2015
2015	Angela Lansbury	Blithe Spirit	Madame Arcati
2015	Jamie Adler, Zoe Brough, Perdita Hibbins and Isabella Pappas	The Nether	Iris
2015	Phoebe Fox	A View from the Bridge	Catherine Carbone
2015	Lydia Wilson	King Charles III	Catherine, Duchess of Cambridge
2016
2016	Judi Dench	The Winter's Tale	Paulina
2016	Michele Dotrice	Nell Gwynn	Nancy
2016	Melody Grove	Farinelli and the King	Isabella Farnese
2016	Catherine Steadman	Oppenheimer	Jean Tatlock
2017
2017	Noma Dumezweni	Harry Potter and the Cursed Child	Hermione Granger
2017	Melissa Allan, Caroline Deyga, Kirsty Findlay, Karen Fishwick, Kirsty MacLaren, Frances Mayli McCann, Joanne McGuinness and Dawn Sievewright	Our Ladies of Perpetual Succour	Various Characters
2017	Clare Foster	Travesties	Cecily Carruthers
2017	Kate O'Flynn	The Glass Menagerie	Laura Wingfield
2018
2018	Denise Gough	Angels in America	Harper Pitt
2018	Bríd Brennan	The Ferryman	Aunt Maggie Far Away
2018	Dearbhla Molloy	The Ferryman	Aunt Pat
2018	Imogen Poots	Who's Afraid of Virginia Woolf?	Honey
2019
2019	Monica Dolan	All About Eve	Karen Richards
2019	Susan Brown	Home, I'm Darling	Sylvia
2019	Cecilia Noble	Nine Night	Aunt Maggie
2019	Vanessa Redgrave	The Inheritance	Margaret

=== 2020s ===
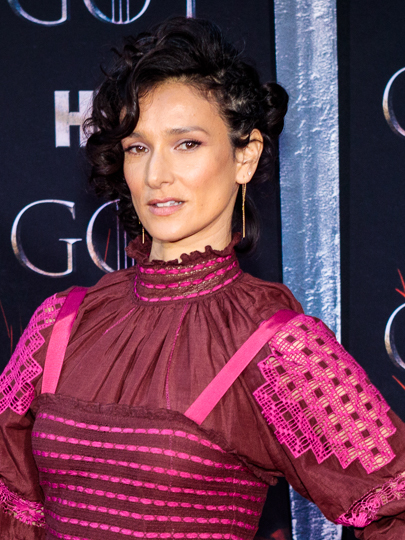
Indira Varma won for Present Laughter (2020)

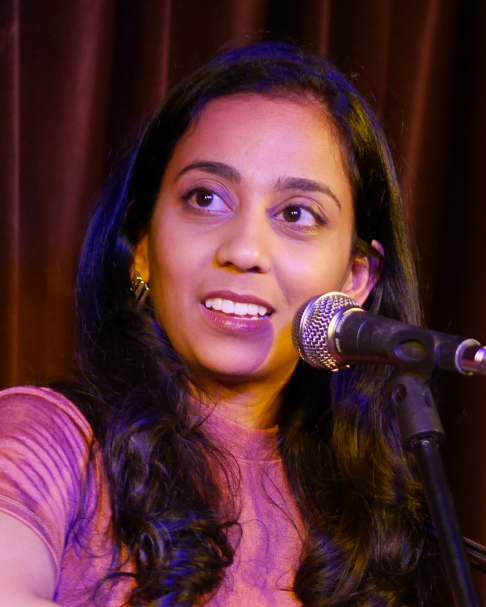
Anjana Vasan won for A Streetcar Named Desire (2023)

Year	Actress	Play	Character
2020
2020	Indira Varma	Present Laughter	Liz Essendine
2020	Michele Austin	Cyrano de Bergerac	Leila Ragueneau
2020	Sophie Thompson	Present Laughter	Monica Reed
2020	Josie Walker	The Ocean at the End of the Lane	Old Mrs Hempstock
2021	Not presented due to extended closing of theatre productions during COVID-19 pandemic (Note: Due to late March 2020 to late July 2021 closing of London theatre productions during the COVID-19 pandemic in England, the 2022 awards recognise productions that launched anytime from February 2020 to February 2022)		
2022
2022	Liz Carr	The Normal Heart	Dr. Emma Brookner
2022	Tori Burgess	Pride and Prejudice* (*sort of)	Lydia Bennet
2022	Christina Gordon	Pride and Prejudice* (*sort of)	Jane Bennet
2022	Akiya Henry	The Tragedy of Macbeth	Lady Macduff
2023
2023	Anjana Vasan	A Streetcar Named Desire	Stella Kowalski
2023	Rose Ayling-Ellis	As You Like It	Celia
2023	Pamela Nomvete	To Kill a Mockingbird	Calpurnia
2023	Caroline Quentin	Jack Absolute Flies Again	Mrs Malaprop
2023	Sharon Small	Good	Helen
2024
2024	Haydn Gwynne (Note: Posthumous nomination)	When Winston Went to War with the Wireless	Stanley Baldwin
2024	Lorraine Ashbourne	Till the Stars Come Down	Aunty Carol
2024	Priyanga Burford	An Enemy of the People	Aslaksen
2024	Gina McKee	Dear England	Pippa Grange
2024	Tanya Reynolds	A Mirror	Mei
2025
2025	Romola Garai	The Years	Annie
2025	Sharon D. Clarke	The Importance of Being Earnest	Lady Bracknell
2025	Romola Garai	Giant	Jessie Stone
2025	Gina McKee	The Years	Annie
2026
2026	Julie Hesmondhalgh	Punch	Joan
2026	Isis Hainsworth	Arcadia	Thomasina Coverly
2026	Lucy Karczewski	Stereophonic	Diana
2026	Hayley Squires	All My Sons	Ann Deever
2026	Sophie Thompson	When We Are Married	Annie Parker

== Multiple awards and nominations for Best Actress in a Supporting Role ==
=== Awards ===
2 Awards

- Marcia Warren

=== Nominations ===
3 Nominations

- Marcia Warren
- Bríd Brennan
- Gina McKee
- Sophie Thompson

2 Nominations

- Elizabeth Spriggs
- Barbara Leigh-Hunt
- Romola Garai
- Sharon D. Clarke
- Brenda Bruce
- Zoë Wanamaker
- Clare Higgins
- Rachael Stirling

== See also ==
- Critics' Circle Theatre Award for Best Actress
- Evening Standard Theatre Award for Best Actress
- Lists of acting awards
- List of awards for supporting actor
- Tony Award for Best Featured Actress in a Play
