= 1994 Laurence Olivier Awards =

Edition of London theatre awards

The 1994 Laurence Olivier Awards were held in 1994 in London celebrating excellence in West End theatre by the Society of London Theatre.

== Winners and nominees ==
Details of winners (in bold) and nominees, in each award category, per the Society of London Theatre.

Play of the Year	Best New Musical
**Arcadia by Tom Stoppard – National Theatre Lyttelton**; Angels in America: Perestroika by Tony Kushner – National Theatre Cottesloe; Oleanna by David Mamet – Royal Court / Duke of York's; The Last Yankee by Arthur Miller – Duke of York's	**City of Angels – Prince of Wales**; Sunset Boulevard – Adelphi
Best Revival of a Play or Comedy	Best Musical Revival
**Machinal – National Theatre Lyttelton**; Medea – Wyndham's; The Deep Blue Sea – Apollo; The Winter's Tale – RSC at the Barbican	**Sweeney Todd – National Theatre Cottesloe**; Cabaret – Donmar Warehouse; Grease – Dominion; The Beggar's Opera – RSC at the Barbican
Best Comedy	Best Entertainment
**Hysteria by Terry Johnson – Royal Court**; April in Paris by John Godber – Ambassadors; The Life of Stuff by Simon Donald – Donmar Warehouse; Time of My Life by Alan Ayckbourn – Vaudeville	**A Christmas Carol – Old Vic**; Jamais Vu – Vaudeville; Kit and The Widow's January Sale – Vaudeville; Stomp – Sadler's Wells
Best Actor	Best Actress
**Mark Rylance as Benedick in Much Ado About Nothing – Queen's**; Henry Goodman as Sigmund Freud in Hysteria – Royal Court; Patrick Stewart as Various in A Christmas Carol – Old Vic; David Suchet as John in Oleanna – Royal Court	**Fiona Shaw as Young Woman in Machinal – National Theatre Lyttelton**; Kathryn Hunter as Skriker in The Skriker – National Theatre Cottesloe; Diana Rigg as Medea in Medea – Wyndham's; Penelope Wilton as Hester Collyer in The Deep Blue Sea – Apollo
Best Actor in a Musical	Best Actress in a Musical
**Alun Armstrong as Sweeney Todd in Sweeney Todd – National Theatre Cottesloe / Lyttelton**; Roger Allam as Stone in City of Angels – Prince of Wales; David Burt as Captain Macheath in The Beggar's Opera – RSC at the Barbican; Alan Cumming as Emcee in Cabaret – Donmar Warehouse	**Julia McKenzie as Mrs. Lovett in Sweeney Todd – National Theatre Cottesloe / Lyttelton**; Haydn Gwynne as Donna/Oolie in City of Angels – Prince of Wales; Patti LuPone as Norma Desmond in Sunset Boulevard – Adelphi; Elaine Paige as Édith Piaf in Piaf – Piccadilly
Best Comedy Performance
**Griff Rhys Jones as Redillon in An Absolute Turkey – Globe**; Ken Campbell as Performer in Jamais Vu – Vaudeville; Nicholas Le Prevost as Pontagnac in An Absolute Turkey – Globe; Maggie Smith as Lady Bracknell in The Importance of Being Earnest – Aldwych
Best Actor in a Supporting Role	Best Actress in a Supporting Role
**Joseph Mydell as Belize in Angels in America: Perestroika – National Theatre Cottesloe**; Richard McCabe as Autolycus in The Winter's Tale – RSC at the Barbican; Rufus Sewell as Septimus Hodge in Arcadia – National Theatre Lyttelton	**Helen Burns as Karen Frick in The Last Yankee – Duke of York's**; Rosemary Leach as Mrs Railton-Bell in Separate Tables – Albery; Sandy McDade as Janice in The Life of Stuff – Donmar Warehouse; Sophie Thompson as Marcie Banks in Wildest Dreams – RSC at the Barbican Pit
Best Supporting Performance in a Musical
**Sara Kestelman as Frau Schneider in Cabaret – Donmar Warehouse**; Henry Goodman as Buddy Fidler in City of Angels – Prince of Wales; Barry James as Beadle Bamford in Sweeney Todd – National Theatre Cottesloe / Lyttelton; Adrian Lester as Anthony Hope in Sweeney Todd – National Theatre Cottesloe / Lyttelton
Best Director of a Play	Best Director of a Musical
**Stephen Daldry for Machinal – National Theatre Lyttelton**; Phyllida Lloyd for Hysteria – Royal Court; Adrian Noble for The Winter's Tale – RSC at the Barbican; Trevor Nunn for Arcadia – National Theatre Lyttelton	**Declan Donnellan for Sweeney Todd – National Theatre Cottesloe / Lyttelton**; Michael Blakemore for City of Angels – Prince of Wales; John Caird for The Beggar's Opera – RSC at the Barbican; Sam Mendes for Cabaret – Donmar Warehouse
Best Theatre Choreographer
**Luke Cresswell and Steve McNicholas for Stomp – Sadler's Wells**; Welcome Msomi for Tamburlaine the Great – RSC at the Barbican; Arlene Phillips for Grease – Dominion; Anthony Van Laast for Hair – Old Vic and The Beggar's Opera – RSC at the Barbican
Best Set Designer	Best Costume Designer
**Mark Thompson for Hysteria – Royal Court**; Peter J. Davison for Medea – Wyndham's; Ian MacNeil for Machinal – National Theatre Lyttelton; Anthony Ward for The Winter's Tale – RSC at the Barbican	**Gerald Scarfe for An Absolute Turkey – Globe**; Sue Blane for Antony and Cleopatra – RSC at the Barbican; Johan Engels for Tamburlaine the Great – RSC at the Barbican; Anthony Ward for The Winter's Tale – RSC at the Barbican
Best Lighting Designer
**Rick Fisher for Hysteria – Royal Court, Machinal – National Theatre Lyttelton and Moonlight – Comedy**; Wayne Dowdeswell and Terry Hands for Tamburlaine the Great – RSC at the Barbican; Wayne Dowdeswell for Medea – Wyndham's; Brian Harris for The School of Night – RSC at the Barbican Pit
Outstanding Achievement in Dance	Best New Dance Production
**The dancers for their season, London Contemporary Dance Theatre – Sadler's Wells**; Darcey Bussell in Ballet Imperial and La Ronde, The Royal Ballet – Royal Opera House; Sylvie Guillem in Herman Schmerman, The Royal Ballet – Royal Opera House; Marion Tait for choreographing Romeo and Juliet, Birmingham Royal Ballet – Royal Opera House	**Choreartium, Birmingham Royal Ballet – Royal Opera House**; Herman Schmerman, The Royal Ballet – Royal Opera House; Romeo and Juliet, Birmingham Royal Ballet – Royal Opera House; The Nutcracker, Adventures in Motion Pictures – Sadler's Wells
Outstanding Achievement in Opera	Outstanding New Opera Production
**The orchestra for Inquest of Love and Lohengrin, English National Opera – London Coliseum**; Paul Daniel for conducting, the ensemble and the orchestra for Gloriana, Opera North – Royal Opera House; Charles Mackerras for conducting Tristan und Isolde, Welsh National Opera – Royal Opera House; Ann Murray in Ariodante, English National Opera – London Coliseum	**La damnation de Faust, The Royal Opera – Royal Opera House**; Ariodante, English National Opera – London Coliseum; Die Meistersinger von Nürnberg, The Royal Opera – Royal Opera House; Gloriana, Opera North – Royal Opera House
Society Special Award	The Times Award for Outstanding Contribution to British Theatre
**Sam Wanamaker**	**Peter Brook**

== Productions with multiple nominations and awards ==
The following 25 productions, including two ballets and two operas, received multiple nominations:

- 6: Sweeney Todd
- 5: City of Angels, Hysteria, Machinal and The Winter's Tale
- 4: Cabaret and Medea
- 3: An Absolute Turkey, Arcadia, Oleanna and Tamburlaine the Great
- 2: A Christmas Carol, Angels in America: Perestroika, Ariodante, Gloriana, Grease, Herman Schmerman, Jamais Vu, Romeo and Juliet, Stomp, Sunset Boulevard, The Beggar's Opera, The Deep Blue Sea, The Last Yankee and The Life of Stuff

The following four productions received multiple awards:

- 4: Machinal and Sweeney Todd
- 3: Hysteria
- 2: An Absolute Turkey

== See also ==
- 48th Tony Awards
