= 2010 Laurence Olivier Awards =

Award ceremony

- Date: 21 March 2010
- Location: Grosvenor House Hotel

The 2010 Olivier Awards were held on 21 March 2010 at the Grosvenor House Hotel, London.

== Winners and nominees ==
Best New Play	Best New Musical
The Mountaintop by Katori Hall – Trafalgar Studio 1; Enron by Lucy Prebble – Royal Court / Noël Coward; Jerusalem by Jez Butterworth – Royal Court / Apollo; Red by John Logan – Donmar Warehouse	Spring Awakening – Novello; Dreamboats and Petticoats – Savoy; Priscilla, Queen of the Desert – Palace; Sister Act – London Palladium
Best Revival	Best Musical Revival
Cat on a Hot Tin Roof – Novello; A Streetcar Named Desire – Donmar Warehouse; A View from the Bridge – Duke of York's; Arcadia – Duke of York's; The Misanthrope – Comedy; Three Days of Rain – Apollo	Hello, Dolly – Regent's Park Open Air; A Little Night Music – Garrick; Annie Get Your Gun – Young Vic; Oliver – Theatre Royal Drury Lane
Best New Comedy	Best Entertainment
The Priory by Michael Wynne – Royal Court; Calendar Girls by Tim Firth – Noël Coward; England People Very Nice by Richard Bean – National Theatre Olivier; Parlour Song by Jez Butterworth – Almeida	Morecambe – Duchess; Arturo Brachetti: Change – Garrick; Derren Brown: Enigma – Adelphi
Best Actor	Best Actress
Mark Rylance as Johnny "Rooster" Byron in Jerusalem – Royal Court and Apollo; James Earl Jones as Big Daddy Pollitt in Cat on a Hot Tin Roof – Novello; Jude Law as Prince Hamlet in Hamlet – Donmar at Wyndham's; James McAvoy as Ned and Walker in Three Days of Rain – Apollo; Ken Stott as Eddie Carbone in A View from the Bridge – Duke of York's; Samuel West as Jeffrey Skilling in Enron – Royal Court / Noël Coward	Rachel Weisz as Blanche DuBois in A Streetcar Named Desire – Donmar Warehouse; Gillian Anderson as Nora Helmer in A Doll's House – Donmar Warehouse; Lorraine Burroughs as Camae in The Mountaintop – Trafalgar Studio 1; Imelda Staunton as Kath in Entertaining Mr Sloane – Trafalgar Studio 1; Juliet Stevenson as Stephanie Anderson in Duet for One – Almeida / Vaudeville
Best Actor in a Musical	Best Actress in a Musical
Aneurin Barnard as Melchior Gabor in Spring Awakening – Novello; Rowan Atkinson as Fagin in Oliver – Theatre Royal Drury Lane; Bob Golding as Eric Morecambe in Morecambe – Duchess; Alexander Hanson as Frederik in A Little Night Music – Garrick; Tony Sheldon as Bernadette in Priscilla, Queen of the Desert – Palace	Samantha Spiro as Dolly Levi in Hello, Dolly – Regent's Park Open Air; Melanie C as Mrs. Johnstone in Blood Brothers – Phoenix; Patina Miller as Deloris Van Cartier in Sister Act – London Palladium; Hannah Waddingham as Desirée Armfeldt in A Little Night Music – Garrick; Charlotte Wakefield as Wendla Bergmann in Spring Awakening – Novello
Best Actor in a Supporting Role	Best Actress in a Supporting Role
Eddie Redmayne as Ken in Red – Donmar Warehouse; Mackenzie Crook as Ginger in Jerusalem – Royal Court / Apollo; Rory Kinnear as Mitya in Burnt by the Sun – National Theatre Lyttelton; Tim Pigott-Smith as Ken Lay in Enron – Royal Court / Noël Coward	Ruth Wilson as Stella Kowalski in A Streetcar Named Desire – Donmar Warehouse; Hayley Atwell as Catherine Carbone in A View from the Bridge – Duke of York's; Michelle Dockery as Maroussia in Burnt by the Sun – National Theatre Lyttelton; Alexandra Gilbreath as Olivia in Twelfth Night – Duke of York's; Keira Knightley as Jennifer in The Misanthrope – Comedy; Rachael Stirling as Rebecca in The Priory – Royal Court
Best Supporting Role in a Musical
Iwan Rheon as Moritz Stiefel in Spring Awakening – Novello; Sheila Hancock as Mother Superior in Sister Act – London Palladium; Maureen Lipman as Madame Armfeldt in A Little Night Music – Garrick; Kelly Price as Countess Charlotte Malcolm in A Little Night Music – Garrick
Best Director	Best Theatre Choreographer
Rupert Goold for Enron – Royal Court / Noël Coward; Michael Grandage for Hamlet – Donmar at Wyndham's; Lindsay Posner for A View from the Bridge – Duke of York's; Ian Rickson for Jerusalem – Royal Court / Apollo; Bijan Sheibani for Our Class – National Theatre Cottesloe	Stephen Mear for Hello, Dolly – Regent's Park Open Air; Matthew Bourne for Oliver – Theatre Royal Drury Lane; Bill T. Jones for Spring Awakening – Novello; Anthony Van Laast for Sister Act – London Palladium
Best Set Design	Best Costume Design
Ultz for Jerusalem – Royal Court / Apollo; Pete Bishop and Mark Thompson for England People Very Nice – National Theatre Olivier; Christopher Oram for Red – Donmar Warehouse; Anthony Ward for Enron – Royal Court / Noël Coward	Tim Chappel and Lizzy Gardiner for Priscilla, Queen of the Desert – Palace; Peter McKintosh for Hello, Dolly – Regent's Park Open Air; Christopher Oram for Madame de Sade – Donmar at Wyndham's; Amy Roberts for The Misanthrope – Comedy
Best Lighting Design	Best Sound Design
Mark Henderson for Burnt by the Sun – National Theatre Lyttelton; Kevin Adams for Spring Awakening – Novello; Jon Clark for Three Days of Rain – Apollo; Mark Henderson for Enron – Royal Court / Noël Coward	Brian Ronan for Spring Awakening – Novello; Andrew Bruce and Nick Lidster for Mother Courage and Her Children – National Theatre Olivier; Ian Dickinson for Jerusalem – Royal Court / Apollo; Christopher Shutt for Every Good Boy Deserves Favour – National Theatre Olivier
Outstanding Achievement in Dance	Best New Dance Production
Rambert Dance Company for an outstanding year of new work; Colin Dunne in Out of Time – Barbican Pit; Michael Hulls for lighting Two:Four:Ten – London Coliseum; Afterlight, Ex Machina and Eonnagata – Sadler's Wells	Goldberg: The Brandstrup-Rojo Project, ROH2 – Royal Opera House; A Linha Curva, Rambert Dance Company – Sadler's Wells; Afterlight – Sadler's Wells; E=mc², Birmingham Royal Ballet – Sadler's Wells; The Rite of Spring, Fabulous Beast Dance Theatre – London Coliseum
Outstanding Achievement in Opera	Best New Opera Production
Nina Stemme in Tristan und Isolde, The Royal Opera – Royal Opera House; Anja Kampe in Der fliegende Holländer, The Royal Opera – Royal Opera House; Stuart Skelton in Peter Grimes, English National Opera – London Coliseum; Michael Volle in Lulu and Tristan und Isolde, The Royal Opera – Royal Opera House	Tristan und Isolde, The Royal Opera – Royal Opera House; Der fliegende Holländer, The Royal Opera – Royal Opera House; Lulu, The Royal Opera – Royal Opera House; Peter Grimes, English National Opera – London Coliseum
Outstanding Achievement in Affiliate Theatre
Cock – Royal Court Upstairs; Ìyà Ilé: The First Wife – Soho / Tiata Fahodzi; The Great Game – Tricycle
Audience Award for Most Popular Show
Wicked – Apollo Victoria; Billy Elliot – Victoria Palace; The Phantom of the Opera – Her Majesty's; War Horse – New London; We Will Rock You – Dominion
Society Special Award	Lifetime Achievement
Maggie Smith	Michael Codron

== Productions with multiple nominations and awards ==
The following 25 productions, including one ballet and four operas, received multiple nominations:

- 7: Spring Awakening
- 6: Enron, Jerusalem
- 5: A Little Night Music
- 4: A View from the Bridge, Hello, Dolly, Sister Act
- 3: A Streetcar Named Desire, Burnt by the Sun, Oliver, Priscilla, Queen of the Desert, Red, The Misanthrope, Three Days of Rain, Tristan und Isolde
- 2: Afterlight, Cat on a Hot Tin Roof, Der fliegende Holländer, England People Very Nice, Hamlet, Lulu, Morecambe, Peter Grimes, The Mountaintop, The Priory

The following five productions, including one opera, received multiple awards:

- 4: Spring Awakening
- 3: Hello, Dolly
- 2: A Streetcar Named Desire, Jerusalem, Tristan und Isolde

== See also ==
- 64th Tony Awards
