= Anna Murphy =

Anna Murphy may refer to:

- Anna Murphy (musician), (born 1989), Swiss musician and former member of the folk metal band Eluveitie
- Anna Murphy (producer), (born 1969), Scottish film producer
- Anna Murphy, maiden name of Anna Brownell Jameson (1794–1860), art scholar
