= Stage Awards for Acting Excellence =

Set of Scottish theatre awards

The Stage Awards for Acting Excellence are a set of Scottish theatre awards which were established in 1995 to recognise outstanding theatre performances by individuals and companies on the Edinburgh Festival Fringe.

Organised by the theatrical newspaper The Stage, the initial award categories of Best Actor and Best Actress were joined by a Best Ensemble award in 1998. In 2006, an award for Best Solo Show was given for the first time.

Award winners are chosen by a panel consisting of the newspaper's principal Fringe reviewers and are usually announced in a ceremony on the last Sunday of the Fringe Festival. There have been only two Joint Winners awarded, in 1998 and 1999.

== Award winners ==
=== Best Actor ===
- 1995: Mark Pinkosh for Road Movie
- 1996: Edward Halstead for Bartleby
- 1997: John Stahl for Anna Weiss
- 1998: Chris Pickles for Love! Valour! Compassion!
- 1999: Tony Cownie for A Madman Sings to the Moon
- 2000: Greig Coetzee for White Men with Weapons
- 2001: Guy Masterson for Fern Hill and Other Dylan Thomas
- 2002: David Calvitto for Horse Country
- 2003: Richard Dormer for Hurricane
- 2004: James Urbaniak for Thom Pain (based on nothing)
- 2005: Phil Nichol for Edward Albee's The Zoo Story
- 2006: Paul Sparks for Finer Noble Gases
- 2007: Garry Cooper for "Long Time Dead"
- 2008: Ciaran McIntyre for "Deep Cut"
- 2009: Billy Mack for The Sound of My Voice
- 2010: Scott Kyle for Singin' I'm No a Billy He's a Tim
- 2011: Billy Mack for The Overcoat
- 2012: Bill Patterson for And No More Shall We Part
- 2013:
- 2014:
- 2015:
- 2016:
- 2017:

=== Best Actress ===
- 1995: Lynn Ferguson for Heart and Sole
- 1996: Beth Fitzgerald for The House of Correction
- 1997: Eileen Walsh for Disco Pig
- 1998: Siobhan Redmond for Perfect Days + Alison Jean Baker for The Glace Bay Miner's Museum - Joint Winners
- 1999: Jacqueline Linke for Often I Find That I Am Naked
- 2000: Paola Dionisotti for Further Than the Furthest Thing
- 2001: Nichola McAuliffe for Bed Among the Lentils
- 2002: Sandy McDade for Iron
- 2003: Cait Davis for Those Eyes, That Mouth
- 2004: Pauline Goldsmith for Samuel Beckett's Not I
- 2005: Saskia Schuck for Cage
- 2006: Caroline O'Connor for Over The Rainbow
- 2007: Eugenia Caruso and Janet Bamford for Truckstop
- 2008: Rhian Blythe for Deep Cut
- 2009: Cora Bissett for Midsummer (A Play With Songs)
- 2010: Mercy Ojelade for Roadkill, Ankur Productions/Pachamama Productions
- 2011: Alessija Lause for Danny And The Deep Blue Sea
- 2012: Nichola McAuliffe for Maurice’s Jubilee
- 2013:
- 2014:
- 2015:
- 2016:
- 2017:

=== Best Ensemble ===
- 1998: Theatre 28 for Love! Valour! Compassion!
- 1999: The East company for Steven Berkoff's East (the 25th anniversary production) + Kaos Theatre UK for The Kaos Importance of Being Earnest - Joint Winners
- 2000: Grid Iron Theatre Company for Decky Does a Bronco
- 2001: Theatre O for 3 Dark Tales
- 2002: Bomb-itty International for The Bomb-itty of Errors
- 2003: 78th Street Theatre Lab and Paper Hat Productions for Boy Steals Train
- 2004: Grid Iron Theatre Company for Fierce: An Urban Myth
- 2005: The Corn Exchange, Ireland for Dublin by Lamplight
- 2006: National Theatre of Scotland for Black Watch
- 2007: The Shalimar for La Femme Est Morte or Why I Should Not F%!# My Son
- 2008: Live Theatre for Motherland
- 2009: Green Shoot Productions for Chronicles of Long Kesh
- 2010: Beyond Borders Productions Ltd for Do We Look Like Refugees?!
- 2011:
- 2012: Caroline Horton Company for Mess
- 2013:
- 2014: Guy Masterson & Tumanishvili Film Actors Theatre Company for Animal Farm
- 2015:
- 2016:
- 2017:

=== Best Solo Show ===
- 2006: Daniel Kitson for C-90
- 2007: Madi Distefano for Popsicle’s Departure 1989
- 2008: Matthew Zajac for The Tailor of Inverness
- 2009: George Mann for Odyssey
- 2010: Caroline Horton for You’re Not Like the Other Girls Chrissy, Caroline Horton
- 2011: Gerard Logan for The Rape Of Lucrece
- 2012: Silvia Gallerano for The Sh*t/La Merda
- 2013:
- 2014:
- 2015:
- 2016:
- 2017:
