= Anna Murphy (producer) =

Scottish film producer

- Born: 21 August 1969 (age 56); Glasgow, Scotland
- Occupation: Producer

Anna Murphy (born 21 August 1969 in Glasgow, Scotland) is a Scottish film producer.

After gaining her degree in English Literature/Film & Drama from Reading University. she went on to work for BBC Worldwide in London followed by a year in the New York office. She has worked mainly in production for major media companies including Emap, IPC Media and Virgin Media.

In 2005, Murphy formed Feather Productions Limited with writer Tim Whitnall. Their first production, The Sociable Plover, at the Old Red Lion Theatre, Islington, has gone on to achieve international success as a feature film The Hide, starring Alex Macqueen who was nominated for Best Actor at the Evening Standard Awards. and directed by Marek Losey. The play was published by Samuel French publishers in 2011.

Murphy co-produced the successful play Morecambe starring Bob Golding, who was nominated for a Laurence Olivier Award for Best Actor. The production won a Scotsman Fringe First as well as the Olivier for Best Entertainment in 2010 and went on to tour the UK.
