= The Beeps =

British children's television series

- Genre: Animation
- Created by: Malou Bonicos
- Opening theme: "The Beeps"
- Country of origin: United Kingdom
- Original language: English
- No. of series: 3
- No. of episodes: 65

Production
- Production company: Impossible TV Ltd. (Dissolved on Jan 19 2016)

Original release
- Network: Milkshake! (Channel 5)
- Release: 12 March 2005 – 18 October 2008

The Beeps is a British animated pre-school children's television series of 65 x 11-minute episodes. The show was initially broadcast in the UK on Channel 5's Milkshake! segment. Subsequently transmitted worldwide.

The series details the cheerful daily lives and adventures of the Beeps, a group of egg-shaped characters who live on Beep Island. The show is created by illustrator Malou Bonicos.

The show features several notable actors: Timmy Mallett, Dani Harmer, Daniel Peacock, Elinor Grace, Sadie Wilson, Caroline Bernstein, Bob Golding, Tim Whitnall and Tom Baker as the narrator. The show's theme tune and original score are composed by Gareth Cousins. Peter Gosling provided The Beep-Beep Tree Song featured in every episode.

The Beeps was initially distributed by Southern Star and subsequently by Endemol Worldwide Distribution to over sixty five countries.

== Characters ==
=== Beeps ===
- Beep Beep (voiced by Dani Harmer) – A bubbly, excitable young female Beep who can often be seen in roller-skates.
- Brainy Beep (voiced by Bob Golding) – A slightly eccentric male professor Beep resembling Albert Einstein.
- Smelly Beep (voiced by Timmy Mallett) – A sloppy male Beep who likes smelling bad.
- Bossy Beep (voiced by Sadie Wilson) – An assertive but well-meaning female Beep.
- Sleepy Beep (voiced by Tim Whitnall) – A male Beep who is always tired.
- Leafy Beep (voiced by Bob Golding) – A male gardener Beep.
- Teeny Beep (voiced by Elinor Grace) – A very small female Beep who is often bumped into by accident, which brings out her irritability. She lives with Leafy Beep and may be his daughter.
- Nosey Beep (voiced by Caroline Bernstein) – An adventurous female Beep who likes to look around things.
- Yuk (voiced by Bob Golding) – A grumpy male Beep.

=== Others ===
- Drozzle (voiced by Bob Golding) – A good-hearted but mopey and grouchy cloud.
- Beeposaurus (voiced by Daniel Peacock)
- The Sockroaches (voiced by Kate O'Sullivan) – Some socks owned by Smelly Beep who often sing during episodes.
- The Beep Beep Tree (voiced by Peter Gosling)
- Narrator (Tom Baker)
