= Sandy McDade =

Scottish actress (born 1964)

- Born: February 1964 (age 62); Galashiels, Scotland
- Occupation: Actress
- Known for: Margaret Brown (née Ellison) in the TV series Lark Rise to Candleford
- Spouse: David Schneider (current)
- Partner: Tam Dean Burn (previous)
- Children: 3 (Skye, Miriam and Clara)
- Parent(s): Joan and Bill McDade
- Awards: 2003 Evening Standard Theatre Award for Best Actress for her performance in Iron

Sandra Isobel McDade (born February 1964), professionally known as Sandy McDade or Sandy McDare, is a Scottish actress, known for her part as Margaret Brown (née Ellison) in the television series Lark Rise to Candleford, Miss Scatcherd in the 2011 film Jane Eyre, and Fay on stage at the Royal Court Theatre Downstairs in Iron, which won her the 2003 Evening Standard Theatre Award for Best Actress.

== Early life ==
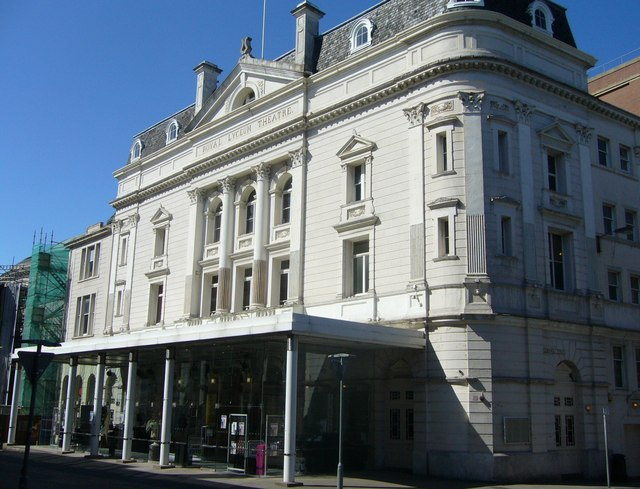
Royal Lyceum Theatre

McDade grew up in Gracemount in Edinburgh, where she attended Gracemount High School. By the age of 15 she obtained a place at the Scottish Youth Theatre, where she made her stage debut at the Royal Lyceum Theatre.

== Professional life ==
McDade's professional acting career has involved acting on television, film and on the stage, although most of her parts have been in supporting roles. For the lead role in Iron, she won Best Actress in both the 2002 Stage Awards for Acting Excellence and the 2003 Evening Standard Theatre Awards. She would later go on to play her most famous part to date, that of Margaret Brown (née Ellison) in the BBC Television series Lark Rise to Candleford.

== Filmography ==
=== Television ===
McDade has been in the cast of some of the most popular British television series, such as Hamish Macbeth, Taggart, A Touch of Frost, The Office, Lark Rise to Candleford and EastEnders

- The Ruth Rendell Mysteries (1991), Moira, “From Doon with Death: Part 1 & 2
- Heading Home (1991), Lesley Perone
- Taggart (1992, 2000 & 2008)
- A Touch of Frost (1992 & 2004)
- Doctor Finlay (1993), Mary Thomson, “A Bitter Pill”
- Hamish Macbeth (1997), Jean Foley, TV Series
- McCallum (1998), Christine, “Running on Empty”
- The Bill (2000), Tracey Perry
- Randall & Hopkirk (Deceased) (2000), Karen, “Mental Apparition Disorder”
- Holby City (2001)
- Masterpiece (2003-2013)
- My Uncle Silas (2003)
- Rockface (2003)
- Judge John Deed (2003)
- The Office (Christmas specials) (2003)
- Quite Ugly One Morning (2004)
- Teachers (2004), Inspector
- Down to Earth (2005), Fay Curtis, “Ignorance is Bliss”
- Secret Smile (2005), Susan, TV Mini-Series
- Vital Signs (2006), Dr. Phillips, TV Series
- Silent Witness (2007)
- Comedy Lab (The Smallest Game in Town) (2007)
- By the Book (2007)
- Lark Rise to Candleford (2008-2011)
- New Tricks (2012), Helen Wray, “Glasgow UCOS”
- Misfits (2012), Sister Catherine, TV Series
- Father Brown (2013), Marjorie Shipton, “The Standing Stones”
- Agatha Christie's Poirot (2013), Mrs Rice, “The Labours of Hercules”
- The Lady Vanishes (2013), Mrs Barnes
- Agatha Raisin and the Quiche of Death (2014), Gail Murray
- EastEnders (2015-2016), Sister Judith
- Guilt (2021), Jackie
- The Wheel of Time (2021), Maigan
- Sanditon (2022), Miss Beatrice Hankins

=== Film ===
Year	Title	Role
1991	London Kills Me	Woman diner
1995	Restoration	Hannah
2004	One Last Chance	Aunt Jean
2005	Mrs Henderson Presents	Civil servant
2011	Jane Eyre	Miss Scatcherd

== Theatre ==
- The Life of Stuff
- Iron
- After Dido
- Making Stalin Laugh
- The Seagull
- A Period of Adjustment
- The House of Bernarda Alba
- Prayer for Owen Meany
- Twelfth Night
- As I Lay Dying
- 12 Dancing Princesses
- Cyrano de Bergerac
- The Skriker
- The Rivals
- Pioneers in Ingolstadt
- Macbeth
- Peer Gynt
- Ghetto
- Fuenteovejuna
- The Good Person of Szechwan
- Señora Carrar's Rifles
- A Woman Killed with Kindness
- Harry Potter and the Cursed Child

=== Theatre awards and nominations ===
Year	Award	Category	Work	Theatre	Result
1994	Laurence Olivier Awards	Best Actress in a Supporting Role	The Life of Stuff	Donmar Warehouse	Nominated
2002	Stage Awards for Acting Excellence	Best Actress	Iron	Traverse Theatre	Won
2003	Evening Standard Theatre Awards	Best Actress	Iron	Royal Court Theatre	Won

== Radio ==
- Life: An Audio Tour (BBC Radio 4) (2008)
- Births, Deaths and Marriages (BBC Radio 4) (2012-2013)

== See also ==
- List of British actors
- List of people from Edinburgh
