= Fraser Murdoch =

Scottish animator

- Born: Kirkcaldy, Scotland
- Education: University of Dundee (DJCAD)
- Occupations: Film director, screenwriter, visual effects artist

Fraser Murdoch is a Scottish animator.

== Career ==
=== Cunningham's Scrap ===
Cunningham's Scrap which had the working title of Bab: The Man Who Took Too Much is a short film written and directed by Murdoch. In November 2016, the casting of Scott Kyle and Gregor Firth was announced. The pair played alongside each other in Outlander, where Kyle played Ross and Firth played the role of Kincaid, two of the men of Lallybroch, both of whom Murdoch met whilst working on Outlander.
