= Phyllida Lloyd =

English film director and producer (born 1957)

Phyllida Lloyd CBE
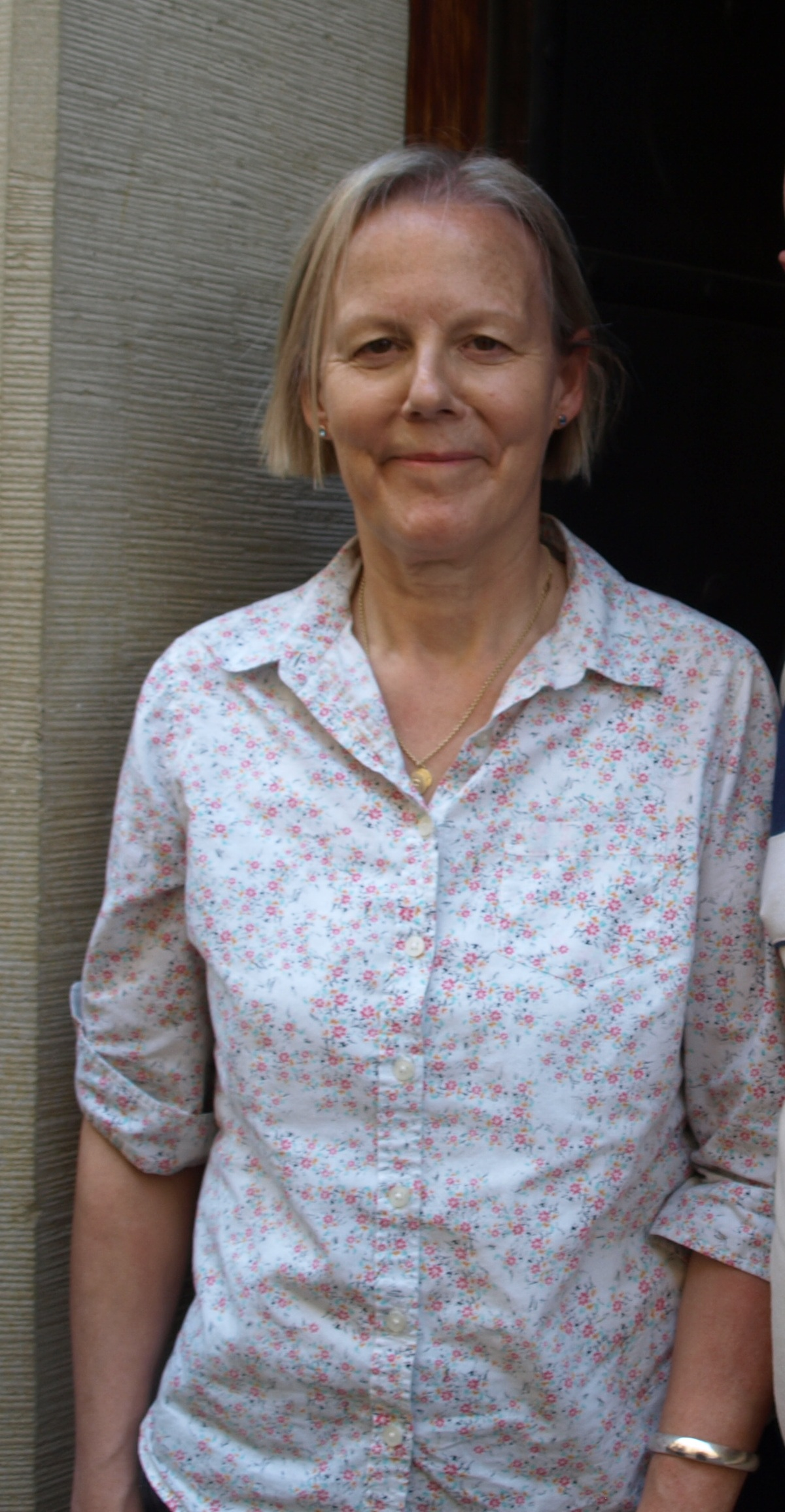
- Lloyd in 2015
- Born: Phyllida Christian Lloyd; 17 June 1957 (age 69); Nempnett Thrubwell, Somerset, England
- Occupations: Film and theatre director
- Years active: 1997–present
- Notable work: Mamma Mia!; The Iron Lady

Phyllida Christian Lloyd, CBE (born 17 June 1957) is an English film and theatre director and producer. She has been nominated for a British Academy Film Award, a European Film Award, a Laurence Olivier Award and two Tony Awards. She was made Commander of the Order of the British Empire (CBE) by Queen Elizabeth II in the 2010 New Year Honours.

Her theatre work includes directing productions at the Royal Court Theatre and Royal National Theatre, and opera director for Opera North and the Royal Opera House Covent Garden. Her adaptation of three Shakespeare plays (Julius Caesar, Henry IV and The Tempest) received acclaim from critics, with The Guardian calling it "one of the most important theatrical events of the past 20 years". (Note: Various sources:)

She is best known for directing the Meryl Streep–protagonized films Mamma Mia! (2008) and The Iron Lady (2011), the latter winning Academy Awards for Best Actress and Best Makeup.

== Early life and education ==
Lloyd was born and raised in Nempnett Thrubwell, Somerset, south of Bristol. She attended Lawnside School, which merged with Malvern St James in 1994.

== Career ==
=== 1979–1999: Early works and acclaim ===
After graduating from the Department of Drama and Theatre Arts at Birmingham University in 1979 (BA, English), she spent five years working in BBC Television Drama. In 1985 she was awarded an Arts Council of Great Britain bursary to be Trainee Director at the Wolsey Theatre, Ipswich. The following year she was appointed associate director at the Everyman Theatre, Cheltenham, then in 1989 Associate Director of the Bristol Old Vic, where her production of The Comedy of Errors was a success.

She moved on to the Royal Exchange Theatre, Manchester where she directed The Winter's Tale, The School for Scandal, Medea, and an acclaimed production of Death and the King's Horseman by Wole Soyinka. In 1991 she made her debut at the Royal Shakespeare Company with a well-received production of a little-known play by Thomas Shadwell, The Virtuoso. Although she followed this in 1992 with a successful production of the rarely seen Artists and Admirers by Alexander Ostrovsky, she has, as of 2007, never returned to the RSC.

Also in 1992 came her first commercial success: her Royal Court Theatre production of John Guare's Six Degrees of Separation transferred to the West End. In 1994 she made her debut at Royal National Theatre with a production of Pericles which divided the critics. There was general praise, however, for her productions of Hysteria by Terry Johnson at the Royal Court and Bertolt Brecht/Kurt Weill's The Threepenny Opera at the Donmar Warehouse.

By this time, Lloyd's work had come to the attention of Nicholas Payne, then running Opera North. For her debut as an opera director he steered her to what was, at least in the UK, an obscurity – L'Etoile by Chabrier. The production was a great success, setting Lloyd on a significant and award-winning career as an opera director. Productions since then include La Boheme, Gloriana, Cherubini's Medea, Albert Herring and Peter Grimes for Opera North; Dialogues of the Carmelites for English National Opera/Welsh National Opera; Verdi's Macbeth (for the Bastille Opera and the Royal Opera House Covent Garden); the premiere of Poul Ruders' opera The Handmaid's Tale (from the novel by Margaret Atwood); and a controversial Ring cycle for ENO. For Gloriana A Film She received an International Emmy and a FIPA d'Or. Her productions have won the Royal Philharmonic Society Award in 1991 (Gloriana) 2000 (The Carmelites) and 2007 (Peter Grimes).

In spite of the mixed reception accorded to her first production at the National Theatre, Lloyd nonetheless returned to direct productions of The Way of the World, Pericles, What the Butler Saw, The Prime of Miss Jean Brodie and The Duchess of Malfi, which were well received. She directed an award-winning production of Boston Marriage at London's Donmar Warehouse in 2001. Other recent work includes Friedrich Schiller's Mary Stuart newly adapted by poet Peter Oswald, which ran at the Donmar Warehouse, London, and was transferred to the Apollo Theatre, London, and then to the Broadway in spring 2009.

=== 2000–present: Mamma Mia! and film work ===
In 1999, Lloyd was offered the chance to direct the ABBA musical Mamma Mia!, which became a hit, not only in the West End and on Broadway, but worldwide. She directed the 2008 cinematic adaptation, which marked her feature debut. By the end of 2008, the film had been certified as the biggest grossing film at the UK box office ever. It was also certified as the UK's biggest-selling DVD. She was nominated as Best Director of a Play in the 2009 Tony Awards for her production of Mary Stuart. In 2013 Lloyd directed Cush Jumbo in a one-woman show about Josephine Baker at the Bush Theatre and subsequently at Joe's Pub in New York. Between 2012 and 2017 she directed the Donmar Warehouse Trilogy in London and New York. Harriet Walter played Brutus in Julius Caesar, the title role in Henry IV and Prospero in The Tempest in a single day. Susannah Clapp in The Guardian described the Trilogy as "one of the most important theatrical events of the last twenty years".

Lloyd directed The Iron Lady, a biopic of former British Prime Minister Margaret Thatcher, with Meryl Streep as Thatcher. The film entered production in January 2011 and was released in December of that year. Meryl Streep won the Academy Award for Best Actress for her performance as Thatcher. Lloyd's film Herself written by Clare Dunne and Malcolm Campbell and starring Clare Dunne premiered at The 2020 Sundance Film Festival.

== Personal life ==
Lloyd's romantic partner is Sarah Cooke.

== Credits ==
=== Film ===
Year	Title	Director	Producer	Ref.
2008	Mamma Mia!	Yes	No	
2011	The Iron Lady	Yes	No	
2018	Mamma Mia! Here We Go Again!	No	Executive	
2020	Herself	Yes	Executive	

=== Television ===
Year	Title	Notes	Ref.
2000	Gloriana	TV movie	

=== Theater ===
As a Director

Year	Title	Playwright	Venue	Ref.
1987	Accidental Death of an Anarchist	Dario Fo	Everyman Theatre, Cheltenham	
1992	Six Degrees of Separation	John Guare	Royal Court Theatre, London	
1994	The Threepenny Opera	Bertolt Brecht	Donmar Warehouse, London	
1999	Mamma Mia!	Catherine Johnson	Prince of Wales Theatre, London	
2001	Mamma Mia!	Catherine Johnson	Winter Garden Theater, Broadway	
2005	Mary Stuart	Friedrich Schiller	Donmar Warehouse, London	
2009	Mary Stuart	Friedrich Schiller	Broadhurst Theater, Broadway	
2012	Julius Cesar	William Shakespeare	Donmar Warehouse, London	
2012	Julius Cesar	William Shakespeare	Brooklyn Academy of Music	
2013	The Rime of the Ancient Mariner	Samuel Taylor Coleridge	Brooklyn Academy of Music	
2015	Josephine And I	Cush Jumbo	The Public Theater, Off-Broadway	
2015	Henry IV	William Shakespeare	Donmar Warehouse, London	
2016	The Taming of the Shrew	William Shakespeare	The Public Theater, Off-Broadway	
2016	Henry IV Parts 1 and 2	William Shakespeare	Donmar Warehouse, London	
2016	The Tempest	William Shakespeare	Donmar Warehouse, London	
2016	Julius Caesar	William Shakespeare	Donmar Warehouse, London	
2018	Tina	Various	Aldwych Theatre, London	
2019	Tina	Various	Lunt-Fontanne Theatre, Broadway	
2024	Grenfell: in the Words of Survivors	Gillian Slovo	St. Ann's Warehouse, Brooklyn	
2025	Mamma Mia!	Catherine Johnson	Winter Garden Theatre, Broadway	

== Awards and nominations ==
Award	Year	Category	Nominated work	Result	Ref.
British Academy Film Awards	2008	Outstanding British Film	Mamma Mia!	Nominated	
European Film Awards	2011	Audience Award	The Iron Lady	Nominated	
Laurence Olivier Award	1994	Best Director of a Play	Hysteria	Nominated	
Tony Award	2009	Best Direction of a Play	Mary Stuart	Nominated	
Tony Award	2021	Best Direction of a Musical	Tina	Nominated	

== Honorary awards ==
Organizations	Year	Award	Result	Ref.
Oxford University	2006	Visiting professor of Contemporary Theatre	Honored	(Note: various sources:)
Bristol University	2006	Honorary degree	Honored	
The Independent	2008	Ranked 7th Most Influential British LGBT Person	Honored	
The Independent	2010	Ranked 22nd Most Influential British LGBT Person	Honored	
Queen Elizabeth II	2010	Appointed Commander of the Order of the British Empire (CBE)	Honored	
Birmingham University	2009	Honorary Degree	Honored	

== See also ==
- List of female film and television directors
- List of lesbian filmmakers
- List of LGBT-related films directed by women
- Women's cinema
