= Scott Kyle =

Scottish actor (born 1983)

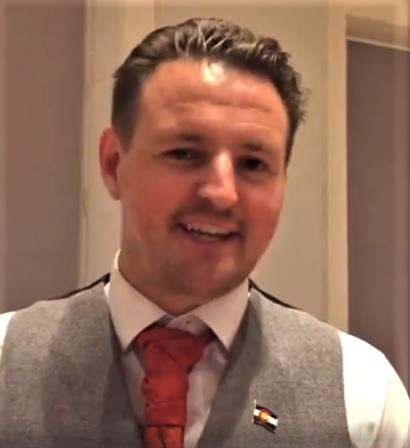
- Scott Kyle in 2017
- Born: Scott James Kyle; 27 June 1983 (age 42); Rutherglen, Lanarkshire, Scotland
- Occupation: Actor / Theatre director
- Years active: 2006-present
- Height: 5 ft 11 in (180 cm)
- Website: https://www.scottkyle.co.uk/

Scott James Kyle (born 27 June 1983), is a Scottish actor, best known for his roles as Ross in Outlander, Clancy in The Angels' Share, and Corporal Stu Pearson in the film Kajaki: The True Story. Kyle received the 2010 Stage Awards Best Actor Award for his role in the play Singin' I'm No A Billy He's A Tim.

== Early life ==
Kyle grew up in Rutherglen, Scotland, the son of a single mother, and attended Stonelaw High School prior to taking an acting course at the Glasgow College of Nautical Studies. While still a student, and working night shifts at a supermarket, he founded the NLP Company to create more opportunities for students wishing to act while still in school.

== Career ==
=== Acting ===
Kyle's first professional role was in 2006's PondLife, a film from director Sean Wilkie, which chronicled the life of student filmmakers on their last day of school. While still in college, Kyle starred in writer Stephen Greenhorn's play Passing Places, which he both produced and took on tour throughout Scotland. He went on to feature as Romeo in director Laura Pasetti's production of Shakespeare's tragedy at the Charioteer Theatre, and in Sandwich (2009), a short film centering on a retired mobster and a current crime lord. The film was transitioned into an internet series on YouTube entitled The Crews (2011), which eventually screened on STV in Scotland.

In 2010, Kyle's had a starring role in Des Dillon's play Singin' I'm No A Billy He's A Tim, which focused on the rivalry between Old Firm (Rangers and Celtic) football fans. The play, which was produced by Kyle's company NLP (No limit People), premiered at the Edinburgh Festival Fringe, where Kyle received the 2010 Stage Awards Best Actor Award for his role, before touring throughout Scotland and Ireland. In addition to the play, Kyle ran anti-sectarian workshops based upon its message at schools and youth groups in and around Glasgow. Later that year he starred opposite Coronation Street's Charlie Lawson in NLP's stage production of author Des Dillon's comedic play Blue Hen.

Director Ken Loach's 2012 comedy The Angel's Share, a film revolving around Glaswegians who discover whisky, saw Kyle feature as Clancy in his first film role. That same year, he starred in director Laura Passetti's play Fleeto, about a young man who joins a gang after his best friend is stabbed, and director Rachel O’Riordan’s Cold Turkey At Nana’s, which focuses on heroin addiction. He would return to the Edinburgh Festival Fringe in 2013 in the title role of the Finnish play Bad Boy Eddie. From there he would star in director Paul Katis' 2014 feature film Kajaki (aka Kilo Two Bravo), where he portrayed real life soldier Corporal Stu Pearson in the story of a small unit of British soldiers positioned near the Kajaki Dam in the Helmand Province of Afghanistan during Operation Herrick in 2006. That same years saw Kyle's first radio production, BBC Radio Scotland's 2014 psychological thriller The Dead of Fenwick Moor, where he portrayed Stevie Caffrey. 2015 saw Kyle return to stage productions in Loranga, an adaptation of Barbaro Lindgren's book Loranga Masarun och Dartanjang.

Kyle joined the cast of Starz' hit time travel drama Outlander, based upon best selling author Diana Gabaldon's popular book series, in 2016. He portrayed Ross the Smith, one of Jamie Fraser's men recruited from Lallybroch to fight for Prince Charles Stuart in the Jacobite rising of 1745. The next year, during the Scottish Mental Health Arts and Film Festival, Kyle starred in writer Mariem Omari's four-person play One Mississippi, which focused on the voices of four men with mental health issues. In 2018, he starred as Bab Cunningham in Fraser Murdoch's animated short, Tubgate: Cunningham's Scrap, which premiered at World of Film: International Festival Glasgow in October of that year. Kyle and Murdoch, along with fellow cast member Gregor Firth, met while working on Outlander. That same year he featured in writer Adam Head's WWI football (soccer) play The Greater Game, which was based upon the true story of the 17th Battalion Middlesex Regiment, the first football club to enlist together, at the Waterloo East Theatre in London. In 2019, he guest starred in the second series of BBC's medical drama Trust Me, opposite fellow Outlander cast member Richard Rankin. He would return to live theatre later that year in A War of Two Halves, a depiction of the Heart of Midlothian F.C. players that enlisted in the military en masse in 1914 at the outbreak of World War I, which was performed at the club's stadium as part of the Edinburgh Fringe Festival. At the 2022 Edinburgh Fringe, he played Renton in a new stage adaptation of Irvine Welsh's novel Porno.

In addition to acting, Kyle runs acting workshops for children both within Scotland and abroad, and will partner with the Edinburgh Acting School, alongside Jen McGregor, to lead their ATCL Speech and Drama Diploma course in 2019. He will also be working with school leadership to develop a series of masterclasses and workshops that will be offered over the next year.

=== Theatre manager ===
Between 2012 and 2017 Kyle was the artistic director of the Bathgate Regal Community Theatre in Scotland, which was housed in a refurbished Category B listed former cinema. In 2017, Kyle was awarded a Pride of West Lothian - Special Recognition Award for Outstanding Contribution to Community Theatre for helping to raise over £65,000 for improvements to the theatre through donations from his Twitter followers. He also organised several Scottish-themed events, including the annual Highland Fling, for fans in Scotland and North America.

In late 2017, Kyle was appointed Program Manager for the Fife Cultural Trust, overseeing the bookings and events for theatres, libraries, museums and galleries in the area. He manages the Dunfermline's Carnegie Hall, the Lochgelly Centre, the Adam Smith Theatre in Kirkcaldy, and Rothes Hall in Glenrothes. Of the position, he has said, "My idea is to have one person: you start there and they work with the theatres, bringing together their different programmes and using their marketing budget to promote the show".

== Filmography ==
=== Television ===
Year	Title	Character	Production	Notes
2011	The Crews	Kenny McFadden	STV	Mini-series, 6 episodes
2016	Outlander	Ross	Starz	6 episodes
2019	Trust Me	Bobby	BBC	2 episodes

=== Film ===
Year	Title	Character	Notes
2006	Pondlife	Brian	
2009	Sandwich	Kenny McFadden	Short film
2012	The Angels' Share	Clancy	
2014	Kajaki: The True Story (released as "Kilo Two Bravo" in North America)	Corporal Stu Pearson	
2018	Tubgate: Cunningham's Scrap	Bab Cunningham (voice)	Animated short, Co-writing credit

=== Theatre ===
Year	Title	Role	Director	Theatre
2007	Passing Places	Alex	Stephen Cafferty	Traveling
2009	Romeo & Juliet	Romeo	Laura Pasetti	Charioteer Theatre, Edinburgh
2010	Singin' I'm No A Billy He's A Tim	Billy	Stephen Cafferty	Traveling Stage Awards Best Actor Award
2010	Blue Hen	Paddy Rafferty	Des Dillon	Citizens Theatre, Glasgow
2012	Fleeto	Kenzie	Laura Pasetti	Charioteer Theatre, Edinburgh
2012	Cold Turkey at Nana's	Tony	Rachel O’Riordan	Oran Mor Theatre, Glasgow
2013	Bad Boy Eddie	Eddie	Iiristiina Varilo	Kajaani Town Theatre, Glasgow
2015	Loranga	Various	Janne Pellinen	The Pleasance, Edinburgh
2017	One Mississippi	T	Umar Ahmed	Tron Theatre, Glasgow
2018	The Greater Game	George Scott	Adam Morley	Waterloo East Theatre, London
2019	A War of Two Halves	Annan Ness	Bruce Strachan	Tynecastle Park, Edinburgh
2022	Porno	Mark Renton	Felix O'Brien	The Pleasance, Edinburgh

=== Radio ===
Year	Title	Character	Production	Director
2014	The Dead of Fenwick Moor	Stevie Caffrey	BBC Radio Scotland	David Ian Neville

== Awards and nominations ==
Year	Award	Category	Nominated work	Result
2010	Stage Awards	Best Actor	Singin' I'm No A Billy He's A Tim	Won
