= Morecambe (play) =

- Written by: Tim Whitnall
- Characters: Eric Morecambe
- Original language: English
- Subject: The life of Eric Morecambe

Morecambe is a play by Tim Whitnall which celebrates the life of Eric Morecambe and is based on his life in the entertainment industry.

The play was co-produced by Guy Masterson of Theatre Tours International and Feather Productions and premiered at the Edinburgh Festival Fringe in the summer of 2009 and transferred to the Duchess Theatre in London's West End for a limited Christmas season running from 9 December 2009 until 17 January 2010.

Morecambe's first production received several awards including the Laurence Olivier Award for Best Entertainment 2010, Scotsman Fringe First Award, Edinburgh 2009 and was nominated for several more including the Stage Award for Best Solo Performance Edinburgh 2009, The ITC Best Touring Production Award and WhatsOnStage Awards for Best Production and Best Actor.

It starred Bob Golding as Eric Morecambe and was directed by Guy Masterson. The play was shown at the Churchill Theatre in Bromley, South London in October 2010.
