= Guy Masterson =

British-born actor, writer and producer (born 1961)

- Born: Guy Alexander Mastroianni; August 10, 1961 (age 64); Hampstead, North London
- Occupations: Actor; Writer; Theatre director; Producer; Playwright

Guy Alexander Masterson (né Mastroianni; born 10 August 1961) is a British actor, writer, theatre director, producer, and playwright. He is best known for his solo stage performances and for his work at the Edinburgh Festival Fringe, including productions such as Under Milk Wood, Animal Farm, Morecambe, and The Shark Is Broken.

== Personal life ==
Masterson was born in Hampstead, North London in 1961, to Carlo Libinick Mastroianni and Marian Mastroianni (née James). He was educated at Christ's Hospital School and Cardiff University.

In 1982, he moved to the United States and worked in hotel restaurant management. In 1984, he became a carpenter and began taking acting classes at UCLA and acting onstage. He returned to the United Kingdom in 1989 and studied Classical Theatre at LAMDA.

Masterson is married and has two children.

== Career ==
Masterson has directed and performed several solo shows, including Under Milk Wood, Animal Farm, and A Christmas Carol. He has also performed in productions such as "The Half", a collection of one-man shows where he plays various characters.

Masterson has been involved with the Edinburgh Festival Fringe for at least 29 years, from his solo performance of Under the Milk Wood in 1994, through to directing and producing shows including Twelve Angry Men (2003), The Odd Couple (2005), Morecambe (2009), and The Shark Is Broken (2019). Both Morecambe and The Shark Is Broken later transferred to London's West End, with The Shark Is Broken making its Broadway debut on 10 August 2023.
