= Bob Golding =

English actor and voice artist

- Occupations: Actor; voice artist
- Years active: 1998–present
- Television: Tweenies

Bob Golding is an English actor and voice artist. He is best known for the voices of Milo and Max in the CBeebies show Tweenies.

== Career ==
=== Television ===
He worked on the CBeebies pre-school children's television series Tweenies as the voices of Milo and Max. The popular show won a BAFTA in 2000 for best pre-school live action. He worked on The Beeps which aired on Channel 5 in 2007 and 2008. He also worked on the CBeebies animated series Harry and Toto which aired in 2008. He has also appeared on television in CBBC's The Slammer, Dick and Dom's Diddy Movies and Diddy TV and was a regular in the sketch show Watson & Oliver for BBC Two.

In 2013 Golding played Horace Spendrich in the ITV drama Mr Selfridge.

His other voice credits include The Hitchhiker's Guide to the Galaxy on BBC radio, produced by Dirk Maggs, PC Plod and Whizz in Noddy in Toyland on Five, Dennis and Gnasher on CBBC, Yo Gabba Gabba! on Nick Jr., and Jim Jam And Sunny on CITV, Higglytown Heroes on Disney Channel and Numberjacks on CBeebies. Other voice work includes the title roles in CITV's Fleabag Monkeyface and Mike the Knight for CBeebies.

He appeared in Peter Kay's comedy show, Britain's Got the Pop Factor... and Possibly a New Celebrity Jesus Christ Soapstar Superstar Strictly on Ice and Peter Kay's Britain's Got an Extra Pop Factor and Then Some 2 + 1 on Channel 4. In these shows he worked with Tim Whitnall who wrote the play Morecambe. Golding also appeared in the soap opera Family Affairs on Five and Fun Song Factory on GMTV.

In 2013, Golding joined the voice cast of Thomas & Friends (starting with King of the Railway) and provided the voices of Stephen, Sidney, Ivan (The Great Race only) and most recently Baz (one of the main antagonists in "Marvelous Machinery"), while his partner in crime Bernie is voiced by Rob Rackstraw and their former engine Sonny voiced by the former EastEnders actor Joe Swash.

=== Stage ===
On stage, Golding was in Eight Miles High by Jim Cartwright at the Octagon Theatre, Bolton, the UK premiere of Wasp by Steve Martin, the world premiere of Buddy's Song by Nigel Hinton at the Victoria Theatre, Stoke-on-Trent. He also appeared in Only the Lonely and Elvis The Musical in the West End.

In Morecambe, a one-man show, Golding played Eric Morecambe, one half of the British comedy duo Morecambe and Wise. The play had a sell-out run at the Edinburgh Festival Fringe in 2009, and won a Fringe First award. On 7 December 2009 Golding appeared on the 2009 Royal Variety Performance at the Opera House Theatre, Blackpool performing part of Morecambe. Golding was nominated for Best Actor in a Musical or Entertainment for Morecambe at the 2010 Laurence Olivier Awards, with Morecambe winning Best Entertainment.

Golding also has a regular role in the Christmas panto at the Alban Arena in St Albans. He has starred in Snow White and the Seven Dwarfs (2011) with Toyah Willcox, Aladdin (2012) with Shaun Williamson, Cinderella (2013) with Gareth Gates and Jack and the Beanstalk (2014) with Steve McFadden.

=== Radio ===
In August 2010, Golding was a guest presenter on Absolute Radio's Dave Gorman show for five weeks while regular presenter Martin White was performing at the Edinburgh Festival Fringe.

=== Comedy Heritage ===
In September 2024, Golding unveiled the Will Hay Appreciation Society's memorial plaque to the comic actor Moore Marriott, at his home in Bognor Regis.
