= Hysteria (play) =

1993 comedy play by Terry Johnson

Hysteria: Or Fragments of an Analysis of an Obsessional Neurosis
- Original language: English
- Written by: Terry Johnson
- Subject: Two of the world's greatest and most eccentric minds collide when Sigmund Freud and Salvador Dalí meet
- Genre: Comedy

Premiere
- Date: 1 August 1993
- Place: Royal Court Theatre; London

Hysteria: Or Fragments of an Analysis of an Obsessional Neurosis is a two-hour comedy play, by British dramatist Terry Johnson, fictionalising a real-life 1938 meeting between Salvador Dalí and Sigmund Freud a year before the latter's death. It is named after the Freudian psychological term "hysteria".

== Plot ==
Freud and Dali meet for tea at Freud's house in Hampstead one summer's afternoon in 1938. The play combines that meeting with the arrival of the mysterious Jessica, who brings serious charges against Freud relating to his treatment of her mother and his theory of presexual shock. In the last months of his illness, the exhausted Freud, trying to put his affairs in order, soon finds himself up to his neck explaining both his life's work and the female undergarments in his garden.

== Performance history ==
The play's London premiere, on 1 August 1993 at the Royal Court Theatre, was directed by Phyllida Lloyd, with Henry Goodman as Freud, Tim Potter as Dali, Phoebe Nicholls as Jessica and David de Keyser as Yahuda. Beryl Bainbridge wrote in her 2005 book Front Row: Evenings at the Theatre: "there's an awful lot going on in this stunning play, and the actors - Henry Goodman, Phoebe Nicholls, David de Keyser and Tim Potter - all give massively intelligent performances".

This production was revived in 1995, as part of the 'Royal Court Classics' season at the Duke of York's Theatre, with Aisling O'Sullivan as Jessica and Fred Pearson as Yahuda. The Sunday Times said of the production: "This is an utterly hilarious and brilliant show and I do mean brilliant. It sparkles, it shines, and it lights up the mind".

In a 2007 production at the Birmingham Rep, Sean Foley appeared as Freud, Sam Swainsbury as Dalí, Ruth Miller as Jessica, and John Burgess as Yahuda.

In the 2012 production at the Theatre Royal, Bath (directed by the author), Antony Sher appeared as Freud, Will Keen as Dalí, Indira Varma as Jessica, and David Horovitch as Yahuda.

Sher and Horovitch revived their roles from 5 September to 12 October 2013 at the Hampstead Theatre, with Adrian Schiller as Dalí and Lydia Wilson as Jessica. Charles Spencer, writing in The Daily Telegraph, said: "Twenty years on it strikes me as a modern classic... Johnson directs his own wildly imaginative but also scrupulously researched play with panache, achieving a farcical comic momentum that somehow finds space for moments of both deep emotion and intellectual rigour...the cast is outstanding."
