= Tim Whitnall =

English actor, playwright and screenwriter

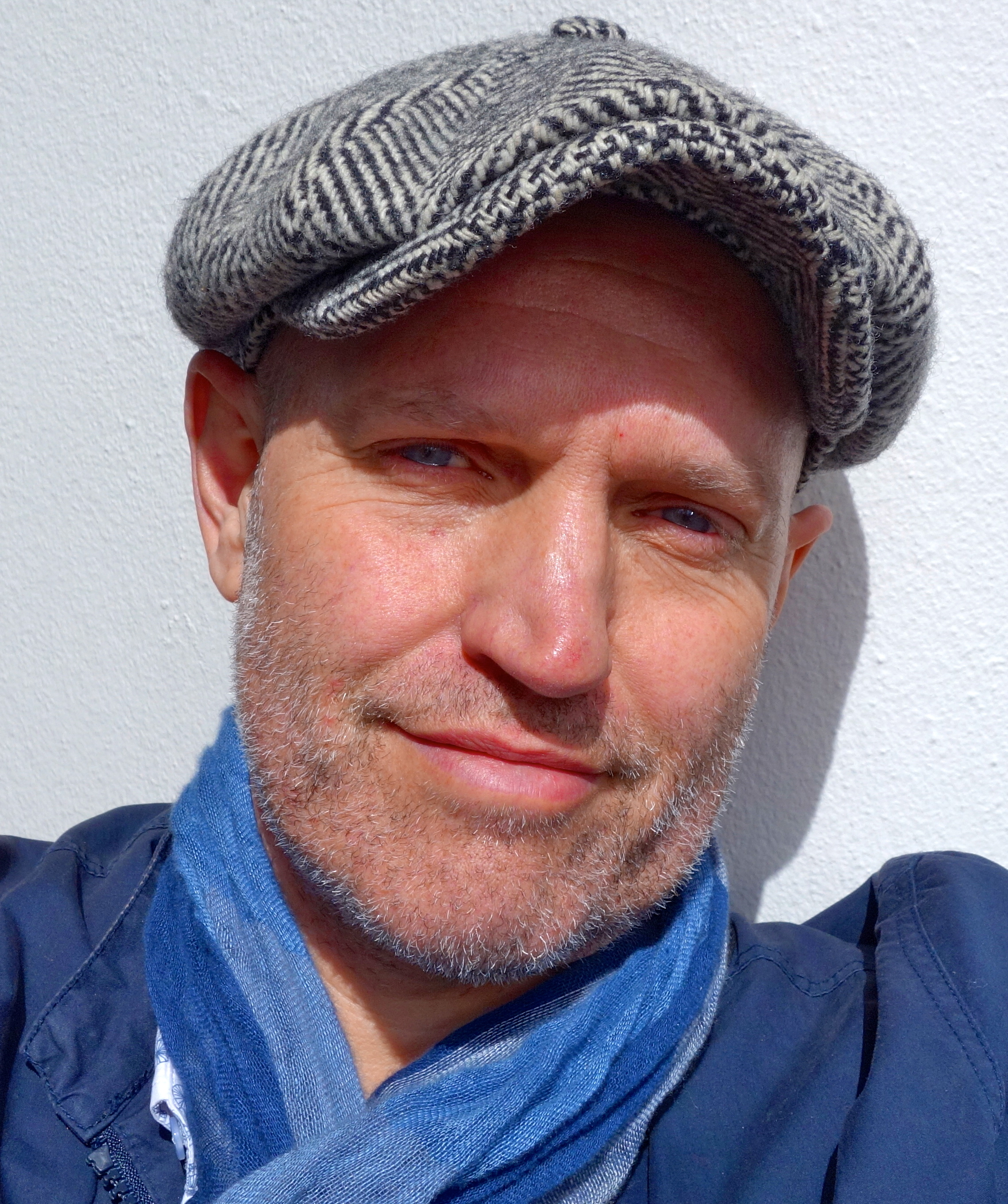
- Whitnall at BFI London in 2013
- Born: Timothy Charles Whitnall
- Occupations: Actor, playwright, screenwriter
- Years active: 1977–present

Timothy Charles Whitnall is an English actor, playwright and screenwriter. He is known for playing Angelo in the long-running CITV series Mike and Angelo and narrating the BBC Children's Television programme Teletubbies from 1997 to 2001. As a writer, he has won a BAFTA and an Olivier Award for his work on television movie Best Possible Taste: The Kenny Everett Story and play Morecambe. He is also a voice actor, providing voices on characters from television shows such as Fifi & the Flowertots, Roary the Racing Car, and Thomas & Friends.

== Career ==
Whitnall began his career in West End musical Elvis in 1977 after winning the role in an open call audition. He has starred in many West End musicals including Grease, The Rocky Horror Show, and Good Rockin' Tonight.

After making TV appearances for the musicals he was involved in, he began a career in television - presenting (and writing for) the BBC Schools series, "The Music Arcade" (with Lucie Skeaping), "Music Time", "Time and Tune", "Music Workshop", and "Let's Sing". He also began making appearances as an actor, playing Jake in ITV children's drama The All Electric Amusement Arcade and Paul in Play for Today episode Not for the Likes of Us.

Whitnall is also known for providing many voice-overs and vocals for TV commercials, animations, and jingles. From the late 1980s to the channel's demise in 2000, he was an announcer on The Children's Channel, also providing the voice to the station's early 1990s mascot Link Anchorman. He was also the voice for Woolworths mascot Keith the Alien in 1998.

In 1990, he succeeded Tyler Butterworth in the role of alien Angelo in Children's sci-fi sitcom Mike and Angelo. He portrayed the character for 10 series, until the show's end in 2000.

Whitnall's theatre play The Sociable Plover, first performed at Old Red Lion Theatre in 2005, was made into a feature film by Poisson Rouge Pictures and Solution Films (re-titled as The Hide) and received its UK première on Film4 in February 2009. Following its screen release at the ICA Cinema, London, the film was released on DVD in January 2010. For this work, Whitnall was nominated for Best First Feature Length Screenplay category in the 2010 Writer's Guild of Great Britain Awards.

Whitnall's next play Morecambe – a tribute to the late comedian Eric Morecambe – won a Fringe First Award for 'innovation and excellence in new writing' at the 2009 Edinburgh Festival Fringe. The show opened at London's Duchess Theatre the following December and toured the United Kingdom through 2010. The piece was nominated in two separate categories in the 2010 Laurence Olivier Awards and won the 'Best Entertainment' category.

In 2012, BBC Four screened Whitnall's 90-minute drama Best Possible Taste: The Kenny Everett Story, which examined and celebrated the life of Kenny Everett. It was directed by James Strong, produced by Paul Frift and starred Oliver Lansley and Katherine Kelly. For it, Whitnall won the Breakthrough Talent Award in the 2013 BAFTA Television Craft Awards.

During 2014, Whitnall joined the cast of the CGI version of the British TV series Thomas & Friends, providing the voices of the characters Timothy, Reg, Mike, Jerome, Oliver the Excavator, and the UK version of Max.

== Personal life ==
Whitnall lives in Richmond, London with his partner, Anna Murphy, with whom he has a production company, Feather Productions Ltd.

== Filmography ==
=== Actor ===
==== Television ====
Year	Title	Role	Notes
1980	Play for Today	Paul	Episode: "Not for the Likes of Us"
1982	The Music Arcade	Presenter	
1982	Sunny Side Up	Presenter, various characters	
1983	The All Electric Amusement Arcade	Jake	Main cast
1986	C.A.T.S. Eyes	Jack	Episode: "Freezeheat"
1989	The Bill	Rodgers	Episode: "Found Offending"
1989	Bergerac	Desk Constable	Episode: "A True Detective"
1989–2000	Mike and Angelo	Angelo	Main cast
1993	Backchat	Link Anchorman	Voice over
1993	Link's Shorts	Link Anchorman	Voice over
1994	Link Looks Into Cartoons	Link Anchorman	Voice over
1994	KTV	Dr. Hunk, Fred	Segments: General Accident, Arthur Square
1997–2001	Teletubbies	Narrator	UK version
1998	Tom and Vicky	Tom, Dickie, Flash	
2003–04	MechaNick	All male characters	
2005–10	Fifi and the Flowertots	Aunt Tulip, Stingo and Hornetto	UK
2006	Underground Ernie	Hammersmith, Jubilee, Paris, and Osaka	Voice over
2007	The Beeps	Sleepy Beep	
2007–10	Roary the Racing Car	Plugger/Lugga, Mr. Carburettor and Farmer Green	UK and US
2008	Britain's Got The Pop Factor	Performer in Eye-patch	
2008–09	The Mr. Men Show	Mr. Lazy and Mr. Nervous	UK version, Voice over
2010	Muddle Earth	Norbert Benson	Main cast
2012–15	Tree Fu Tom	Zigzoo, Stink, Squirmtum, Chezz, and Rickety McGluman	Main cast, Voice over
2013	Henry Hugglemonster	Various characters	Voice over
2014–21	Thomas & Friends	Max (UK) Timothy, Reg, Mike, Jerome, Oliver the Excavator, and the Deputy Minister	Recurring voice roles
2021	DinoCity	Dad	Main cast, Voice over

==== Stage ====
Year	Title	Role	Venue
1977	Elvis	Young Elvis	London Astoria
1979	Grease	Doody	London Astoria
1981	Godspell	Jesus	Young Vic Theatre
1981	Spring Awakening	Melchior	Young Vic Studio, London
1983	Yakety Yak	Danny	UK Tour
1985	The Lambusters		The Bloomsbury Theatre, London
1988	Be Bop a Lula	Eddie Cochran	The Playhouse, Liverpool; UK tour
1991	The Rocky Horror Show	Riff-Raff	Picadilly Theatre, London
1992; 1993	Good Rockin' Tonite	Eddie Cochran, Cliff Richard	Metropolitan, London; Liverpool Empire, Liverpool
1996-1997	Elvis (revival)	Middle Elvis	UK Tour
1998-1999	Four Steps to Heaven	Elvis, Eddie Cochran	UK Tour
2005	The Sociable Plover	Dave	Old Red Lion, Inner London
2025-2026	Dick Whittington and His Cat	King Rat	Theatre Severn, Shrewsbury

==== Film ====
Year	Title	Role	Notes
1986	Billy the Kid and the Green Baize Vampire	Member of Billy the Kid's entourage	
1996	Famous Fred	Additional Vocals	
1999	Animal Farm	Additional Vocals	
2000	Teletubbies: Christmas in the Snow	Narrator	Direct-to-video
2005	Renart the Fox	Renart (English dub)	
2008	Like Other People Do	Rich Man	Short
2010	Rainbow Magic: Return to Rainspell Island	Edison, King Oberon, Snow Beast and Bitten	
2010	Devil's Playground	News Anchor	
2014	Thomas & Friends: Tale of the Brave	Timothy and Reg	Voice; Direct-to-video
2015	Thomas & Friends: The Adventure Begins	Jerome	Voice; Direct-to-video
2015	Sodor's Legend of the Lost Treasure	Oliver the Excavator and Mike	Voice
2016	Thomas & Friends: The Great Race	Timothy and Mike	Voice
2018	Thomas & Friends: Big World Big Adventures!	Bill, Timothy and a Moai Head	Voice

==== Video games ====
Year	Title	Role(s)	Notes
1998	Play with the Teletubbies	Narrator	UK
2000	The World Is Not Enough	Charles Robinson	

=== Screenwriter ===
==== Film ====
Year	Title	Notes
2008	The Hide	Based on his play "The Sociable Plover"
2018	Mr Sunshine	Short, Based on his play "Morecambe"

==== Television ====
Year	Title	Notes
1985–86	And There's More	
2010	Best Possible Taste: The Kenny Everett Story	TV movie
2013	Agatha Christie's Marple	Episode: "Greenshaw's Folly"
2021	The Mallorca Files	Episode: "The Blue Feather"

==== Stage ====
Year	Title	Venue
1999	Harry's Web	Theatre Royal, Windsor
2005, 2010	The Sociable Plover	Old Red Lion, Inner London; UK Tour
2006	The Fabulist	Old Red Lion, Inner London
2008, 2014	Morecambe	Assembly Rooms, Edinburgh; UK Tour
2018	Once Seen on Blue Peter	Chiswick Playhouse, London; Assembly Rooms, Edinburgh
2022, 2023	Lena	The Beacon Arts Centre, Greenock; Assembly George Square (Gordon Aikman Lecture Theatre), Edinburgh
2023	Notes from a Small Island	The Watermill Theatre, Newbury

=== Discography ===
- Elvis - The Original Cast Albums (1978)
- 20 Years On 77-97 (with Darrel Higham & The Enforcers)(1997)
- Even Warren Beatty (with Matthew Strachan) (2002)

== Awards and nominations ==
Year	Award	Category	Result	
2009	"The Scotsman" Fringe First Award	Innovation and outstanding new writing	Morecambe	Won
2010	Laurence Olivier Awards	Best Entertainment	Morecambe	Won
2010	Writers' Guild of Great Britain Award	Best First Feature-Length Film Screenplay	The Hide	Nominated
2013	British Academy Television Craft Award	Breakthrough Talent	Best Possible Taste: The Kenny Everett Story	Won
2013	Broadcasting Press Guild Award	Best Single Drama; Shared with Paul Frift and James Strong	Best Possible Taste: The Kenny Everett Story	Nominated
