= The Hide =

- Directed by: Marek Losey
- Written by: Tim Whitnall
- Produced by: Christopher Granier-Deferre; John Schwab
- Starring: Alex Macqueen; Phil Campbell
- Cinematography: George Richmond
- Edited by: Colin Sumsion
- Music by: Debbie Wiseman
- Distributed by: Poisson Rouge Pictures
- Release date: 5 October 2008 (Dinard Film Festival)
- Running time: 84 minutes
- Country: United Kingdom
- Language: English

The Hide is a 2008 film, the debut from director Marek Losey, who previously had an award-winning career as a director of advertisements. The film starred Alex Macqueen and Phil Campbell, based on the stage play The Sociable Plover by Tim Whitnall, who also wrote the screenplay. The film had the strapline "No Crime Stays Hidden Forever". Produced by Christopher Granier-Deferre and John Schwab.

== Plot ==
The film is set in and around a bird-hide on the Suffolk marshes owned by Roy Tunt (Macqueen). Roy is a middle-aged, obsessive bird watcher, who needs just one more sighting (of the sociable plover) to complete the entire British list of birds. He is unexpectedly joined by a dishevelled and tattooed stranger, who introduces himself as Dave John (Campbell). After an awkward start, the pair build up a rapport, share lunch, have a drink and discuss a wide variety of subjects. Roy tells David that he used to work in a poultry factory and that his wife left him for another man.

Roy's walkie-talkie picks up a police message about a local murder by someone fitting David's description. Dave is armed but his gun falls out of his pocket when he falls asleep and Roy takes it. Roy then confesses that he is the man wanted for murder; that the victims were his wife and her partner. He sickens David by describing how he disposed of the bodies in a poultry factory mincer, turning them into a paste which he has fed to David in the sandwiches they had shared earlier. Roy intends to blow up the police helicopter that is looking for him on the marsh. David tries to reason with Roy but the pair end up fighting. In the struggle, David steals his gun back and kills Roy.

== Filming ==
The film was shot on location at Elmley Marshes on the Isle of Sheppey in November and December 2007.

== Cast ==
- Alex Macqueen as Roy Tunt
- Phil Campbell as Dave John

Macqueen had previously played the role of Tunt in the stage version.

== Critical evaluation ==
The film met with a positive critical reaction; The Scotsman's Alistair Harkness described it as "an absorbing drama from two characters in a single location that simmers with menace and builds to a satisfyingly macabre conclusion". The Independent's Anthony Quinn described it as "a modestly scaled but cleverly written chamber piece", and commented on "the superb underplaying by the two actors, Campbell coiled and terse, Macqueen prissily pedantic and controlling". James Christopher of The Times described the interplay between the two protagonists: "Their arguments have the tension and rhythm of a classic black-box fringe play. It's a crude but enthralling duel with shades of Peter Shaffer's Sleuth. Shades too of Hitchcock’s Rope." The Observer's film critic Philip French identified influences from both Losey's grandfather and Harold Pinter. Time Out's David Jenkins also compared the film to the work of Samuel Beckett. Allan Hunter of the Daily Express also raised Beckett comparisons and called it "moody, minimalist and well-observed".
