= The Priory (play) =

Play written by Michael Wynne

- Written by: Michael Wynne

Premiere
- Date: 2009
- Place: Royal Court Theatre; London

The Priory is a play by Michael Wynne that opened at the downstairs theatre of the Royal Court Theatre in London in 2009. The production starred Jessica Hynes, Rupert Penry-Jones, Charlotte Riley, Alastair Mackenzie, Joseph Millson and Rachael Stirling. After receiving good reviews, its run was extended. Michael Wynne won the Olivier Award for Best New Comedy while Stirling was nominated for a Laurence Olivier Award for Best Performance in a Supporting Role for her role as Rebecca.

== Synopsis ==
Following her split from her boyfriend, Kate decides to invite a group of her closest friends to a renovated and supposedly haunted priory, for a New Year's Eve party. However, as the drinks and drugs start to flow, personal revelations begin to emerge leading to near tragedy and a fraught morning after.

== Characters ==
- Kate: a budding author who has suffered personal tragedy throughout the previous year and is looking forward to a better one.
- Daniel: a gay architect who surfs the internet looking for love.
- Carl: a "resting" actor, best known for a coffee commercial, now happily working in a garden centre and Kate's college boyfriend.
- Rebecca: Carl's BAFTA award-winning wife and obsessive mother of his two small children.
- Ben: an award-winning travel writer.
- Laura: a counter girl at Harvey Nichols and Ben's fiancé of one day, the pair having met the night before.

== Original production ==
The premiere of the play was at the Royal Court Theatre in London. It was directed by Jeremy Herrin and starred Jessica Hynes as Kate, Joseph Millson as Daniel, Rupert Penry-Jones as Carl, Rachael Stirling as Rebecca, Alastair Mackenzie as Ben and Charlotte Riley as Laura.

Michael Coveney from WhatsOnStage wrote, "...Wynne's sharp, funny writing and Jeremy Herrin's exceptionally well acted production ensure total authenticity so that by the end the play feels positively radical in this main stage bastion of the cutting edge." In the Financial Times, Sarah Hemming wrote, "It is a perceptive piece, laced with Wynne’s customary wit and insight. And it has serious points to make about success, failure, peer pressure and loneliness."
