= The Last Yankee =

Play written by Arthur Miller

The Last Yankee is a play by Arthur Miller, which premiered on January 5, 1993, at the Manhattan Theatre Club in New York City. The cast included Tom Aldredge as John Frick, Frances Conroy as Patricia Hamilton, Rose Gregorio as Karen Frick, John Heard as Leroy Hamilton, and Charlotte Maier as the Patient. It was transferred to the Young Vic Theatre in London later that month, opening on January 26 with David Healy as John Frick, Peter Davison as Leroy Hamilton, Zoë Wanamaker as Patricia Hamilton and Helen Burns as Karen Frick.

The play had been performed previously in a much shorter version two years earlier.

== Synopsis ==
The Last Yankee takes place in a present-day state mental hospital, located somewhere in New England. Patricia Hamilton is recovering from depression, and this may be the day she feels strong enough to go home. But a visit from her husband Leroy, a descendant of one of America's founding fathers (but referred to as a "Swamp Yankee"), coincides with that of a successful businessman, John Frick, who has come to see his newly admitted wife, Karen. A clash of values and emotions upsets them all.

It is a play in two parts which focuses on the relationships of two couples – Leroy and Patricia Hamilton, married many years with seven children, and John and Karen Frick, a childless couple. Both women are patients at a mental institution, and act one sees the two men meet for the first time in the waiting room on visitors' day. Karen has not long been institutionalized, and Frick is having a difficult time coping with her mental illness, while Patricia has been in and out of institutions for many years. The two men struggle to communicate under the circumstances, though even this breaks down in the face of their respective situations. Patricia and Karen have become friendly during their time together in the ward, and act two sees the four characters brought together inside, where a picture emerges of a society whose members feel obscurely cheated and where success is equated with failure.

== See also ==
- Yankee
