= The Life of Stuff =

Play by Simon Donald

The Life of Stuff is a play by Simon Donald. It premiered at the Traverse Theatre in Edinburgh in 1992 before transferring the following year to the Donmar Warehouse in London.

A movie version in 1997 was directed by Donald himself and starred Gina McKee and Ciarán Hinds. In 2013, it was revived at the Theatre503 in Battersea, London.

== Awards and nominations ==
- Evening Standard: Most Promising Playwright Award (winner)
- Critic's Choice: Best New Play Award (winner)
- Olivier Awards: Best New Comedy (nominee)
