= Contemporary clowning =

Comedy school

Contemporary clowning (also called modern clowning) is a school of physical comedy that emphasizes interactivity with the audience and surroundings, use of props and a level of absurdity. While it can overlap with the classic white-face school of clowning, the term also refers to a form of experimental comedy that is considered distinct.

In 21st century comedy, clowning exists alongside stand up, sketch comedy, improv, and slapstick. It is one of the major formats at comedy festivals around the world, including the Edinburgh Fringe Festival.

== Characteristics ==
Clowning is highly visual with an extensive use of costumes, makeup and props that are largely absent from the other popular styles of live comedy performance of improv and stand-up. While many contemporary clown performers do wear makeup and costumes as part of their act, they do not generally don the “red nose” clown persona.

In addition, clowning is notably less verbal than stand-up, improv or sketch with a notable use of silence as a technique. Clowning is distinctive for its lack of a fourth wall, featuring high audience engagement. Many acts can have vulgar and carnal moments, including full nudity.

Clowning also emphasizes vulnerability as a way for the performer to connect with the audience, as well as the development of the performer's individual voice.

Some performers have cited they were drawn to clowning because of the flexibility and lack of rules in the experimental form, in contrast to improv or sketch, which have become more rigid in format as the disciplines have matured.

== Schools ==
While traditional clown schools like École Philippe Gaulier in France have drawn students from around the world for decades, regional programs like the Lyric Hyperion, The Clown School and the Idiot Workshop have made Los Angeles a regional hub for clown education.

The Los Angeles clown schools have emerged as alternatives to local comedy training centers such as the Groundlings and Upright Citizens Brigade, which focus more on sketch comedy and stand-up. Some note that the lack of a dominant theater industry in Los Angeles, as compared to New York or London, has given clowning the freedom to move quickly in the city as it allows for greater risk-taking. The Pig Iron Theatre Company and their school have contributed to Philadelphia becoming a hub of contemporary clowning.

== Nouveau Clown ==
Nouveau Clown (French for "new clown") is a European theatrical movement within contemporary clowning that emerged in the second half of the 20th century, rooted in the physical theatre pedagogy of Jacques Lecoq's school in Paris, which from 1956 developed a methodology centred on the search for the performer's own authentic clown.

Unlike traditional circus clowning, which relies on fixed character types such as the Auguste and the White Clown, and on repeatable gags, Nouveau Clown treats the performer's authentic identity as its primary artistic material. Vulnerability, the acceptance of failure on stage, and a live and unpredictable relationship with the audience are considered defining characteristics of the form.

Jango Edwards (1950–2023), an American performer who spent the majority of his career in Europe, was among the most prominent international practitioners of Nouveau Clown. In 2009, Edwards established the Nouveau Clown Institute in Granollers, near Barcelona, a training centre for clown artists that hosted performers from over thirty countries before closing following his death in 2023.

In Italy, the FINC (Festival Internazionale del Nouveau Clown), held annually in Sicily, has presented international Nouveau Clown performances since 2022, with artists including Paolo Nani and David Larible.

== Notable performers ==
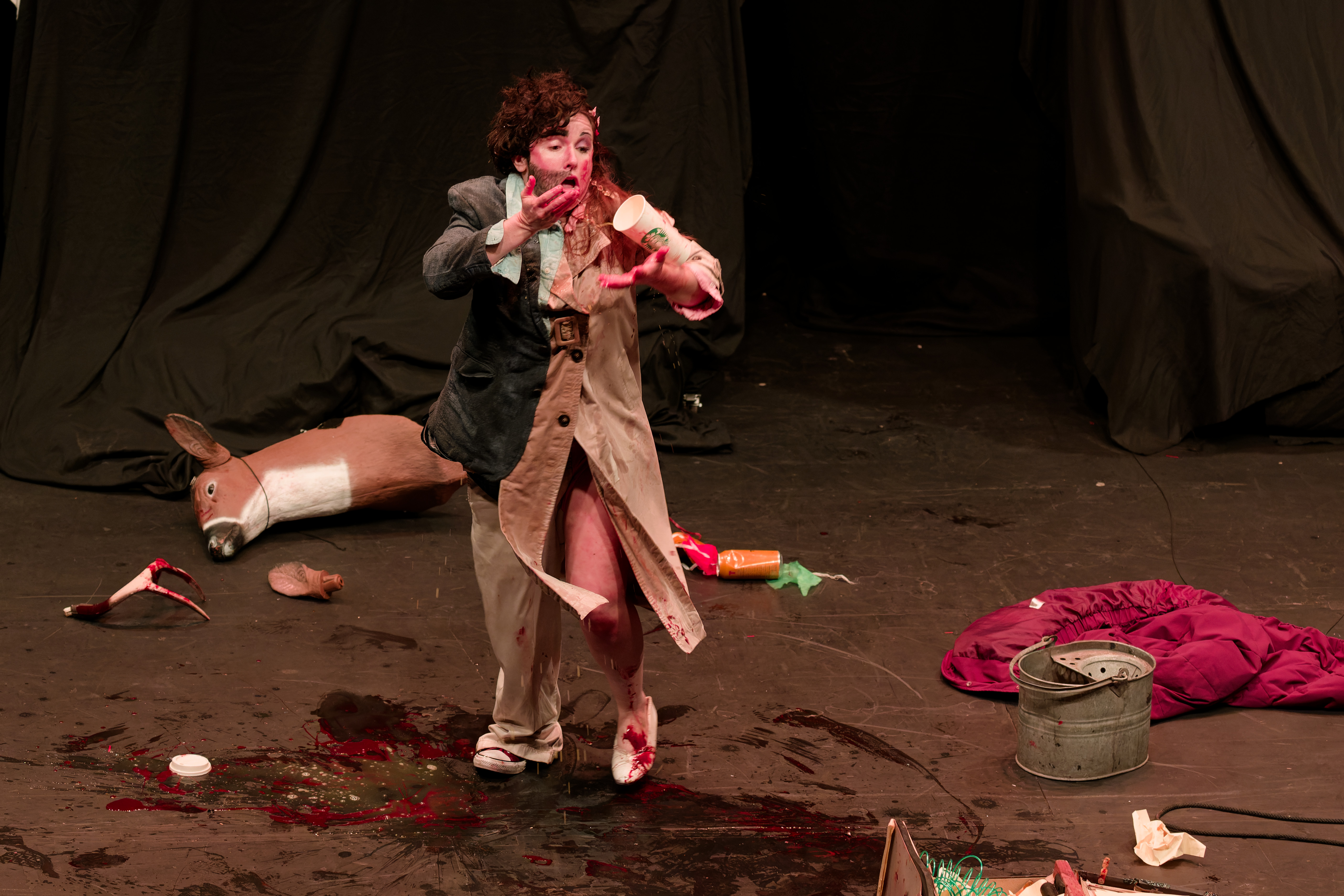
Natalie Palamides clowning for her show, WEER, at Edinburgh Festival Fringe in 2024

Many of the top awards and nominations at the Edinburgh Fringe Festival have gone to clown performances in recent years. Compared to past generations, there have been more and more female clowns. Among the fringe winners is Natalie Palamides, who won a Total Theatre Award in 2018 with Nate: A One Man Show that was later produced for Netflix by Amy Poehler.

In 2023, Julia Masli, an Estonian-born clown, was considered a breakout performer for her show ha ha ha ha ha ha ha, which featured Masli in Victorian costume asking audience members about their problems, which she then proceeded to try to solve.

Many alumni of the École Philippe Gaulier have become notable actors, directors, and comedians. Alumni practicing as clowns include Masli, Zach Zucker, and Phil Burgers.

Clown and performance artist Alex Tatarsky has toured their solo clown shows Sad Boys in Harpy Land, which ran at Playwrights Horizons in 2023, and Americana Psychobabble, which had stops at the Edinburgh Fringe and at Jacob's Pillow. Tatarsky was included in the 2024 Whitney Biennial.
