= Nate – A One Man Show =

Performance by Natalie Palamides

- The title character, Nate, played by Natalie Palamides
- Written by: Natalie Palamides
- Directed by: Phil Burgers
- Starring: Natalie Palamides
- Country of origin: United States
- Original language: English

Production
- Editor: Brenda Carlson
- Running time: 60 minutes
- Production company: Paper Kite Productions

Original release
- Network: Netflix
- Release: December 1, 2020

Nate – A One Man Show is a performance by American comedian Natalie Palamides, which explores consent through the male character Nate. Through audience participation, Nate challenges his ex-girlfriend's new partner to wrestling, and goes on a date with his art teacher Miss Jackson. Initially touring to small audiences around the U.S., Ireland and the U.K., Nate drew attention at the 2018 Edinburgh Festival Fringe, where it won the Total Theatre Award. It was adapted into a Netflix special that was released on December 1, 2020.

With elements of clown and drag king performance, Nate explores the limits of audience consent, as well as how sexual consent is more nuanced than verbal agreement. The character Nate is an exaggeration of manliness who embodies toxic masculinity but is well-meaning. Humor arises from male audience members' physical interaction with a topless Nate, a male character played by a woman. The Netflix recording was critically acclaimed for its humor, themes and focus on audience reaction.

== Synopsis ==
Palamides, as Nate, enters in a red mackinaw jacket with no shirt, combat boots and camouflage pants, with a fake mustache, fake wig and fake body hair. Nate performs a mock motorcycle stunt with an audience member. Nate hands out cans of La Croix Sparkling Water to several people and says that the first person to finish their can "gets to do whatever they want to whoever they want in this room". Finishing his can rapidly, Nate approaches an audience member, hands cupped, and asks if he can touch her breasts. She declines. A different woman gives permission, and a man allows Nate to grab his crotch.

Nate picks a couple from the crowd and asks the woman questions about herself, saying that each answer matches the description of his ex-girlfriend, whose "tuna casserole pussy" he misses. He eventually concludes that the woman—Helen (which Nate pronounces "he-lane")—is his ex-partner, and challenges her partner to a fight. Both topless, Nate wrestles with the man. He performs a half nelson on Nate but declines to flick Nate's nipples.

Nate takes a shower, stripping mostly naked, with a rubber penis in the genital area. Calling out for his best friend, Lucas, an audience member responds. Nate pushes Lucas to call Helen a "whore ass" and asks Lucas to dry him off. They do an elaborate handshake. At an art painting class, the teacher Miss Jackson (a mannequin voiced by Palamides) asks Nate to give his presentation. Nate shows an artwork of a naked woman's body—his ex-girlfriend Helen.

Nate and Miss Jackson go on a date, attending the show Nate and becoming heavily drunk. Nate passes out for a second and suggests they go home, but Miss Jackson proceeds to take his penis out and give him a handjob. At her insistence, Nate autofellates (sucks his own penis). She suggests that they have sex and Nate initiates the act. However, Miss Jackson loses consciousness and Nate stops. With Lucas' help, Nate takes her home.

In the shower again, Nate asks: "is what I did wrong?" Audience members shout out "yes" and "no" in disagreement. Miss Jackson says that she should not have got so drunk, and does not remember the exact sequence of events. At the next art class, Nate and Miss Jackson each apologise for raping the other person, disagreeing with each other's apology.

== Background ==
Palamides has a history of clown performance training and improvisation, though she did not view Nate as pure clowning as it contains sexuality and anger. In a Los Angeles clown training program at the Lyric Hyperion, Palamides was asked to develop a bit in which she felt at risk. She repurposed a previous character, Nate, from 2012 when creating drag characters with the Pig Iron Theatre Company. He was a silent character that Palamides described as a "douchey guy chugging a two-liter bottle of soda watching TV and burping".

She experimented with Nate wrestling an audience member topless. Because of her gender, she felt it had a "taboo quality" different to men wrestling topless. Inspired to construct a love story for Nate, Palamides being exploring consent as a theme. Palamides wanted to engage the audience in ideas through comedy and asking what they thought rather than saying her own opinion. During workshopping, she experimented with material based on sexual misconduct by Harvey Weinstein or Louis C.K., such as mimicking masturbation in a hotel setting while an audience member read a script, or pouring Tic Tacs in drinks passed to the audience.

Palamides enjoyed making audiences feel uncomfortable. She explored how to turn any audience reaction to Nate's behavior—a "yes", a "no", or silence—into humiliation. Palamides aims to get participants willing to be active, such as by calling "hey Lucas" to the crowd and letting a volunteer respond, but found that sometimes participants need to be changed and some were willing to do more than others. She used stage combat if someone was unwilling to wrestle her, to give the appearance of fighting when the person is just holding her arm. The person who played Lucas in the recording was "very reserved": other participants add ingredients to the sandwich referenced in the handshake. He felt that Palamides was looking at him and choosing him, even though she was unable to see the audience in the lighting.

Palamides initially performed the show to audiences of under 100 people. Nate played at the Los Angeles Upright Citizens Brigade Theatre and at two New York tours. At the Edinburgh Festival Fringe in 2018, it won the Total Theatre Award. Palamides also performed at the Dublin Fringe Festival in Ireland and in London. She estimated that she delivered it 100 times as a completed show.

After a Paper Kite producer saw the show at Edinburgh, Palamides met with Amy Poehler, founder of the production company, about adapting it into a recording. To make it marketable despite the visible genitals, Palamides suggested changing the color of the rubber penis or using fake nipples, but this idea was dismissed. When performing onstage, Nate would enter to a poor karaoke rendition of "Bad to the Bone", but the production were prevented from using the original or an imitation, though they had no issue using the brand names La Croix, Uber and Lyft. Funding was received from Comedy Dynamics. The special was directed by Phil Burgers ("Dr. Brown"), who runs the Lyric, and released on Netflix on December 1, 2020.

== Analysis ==
=== Genre ===
Vulture's Helen Shaw saw Nate as incorporating elements of "discomfort comedy", clown performance, drag king show and cartoon. Shaw compared Palamides to entertainer Andy Kaufman, character comedian Sacha Baron Cohen, cartoon character Elmer Fudd and clown Red Bastard. The show tests boundaries of permission within theater and what makes audiences laugh, but is not a stand-up comedy routine.

=== Consent ===
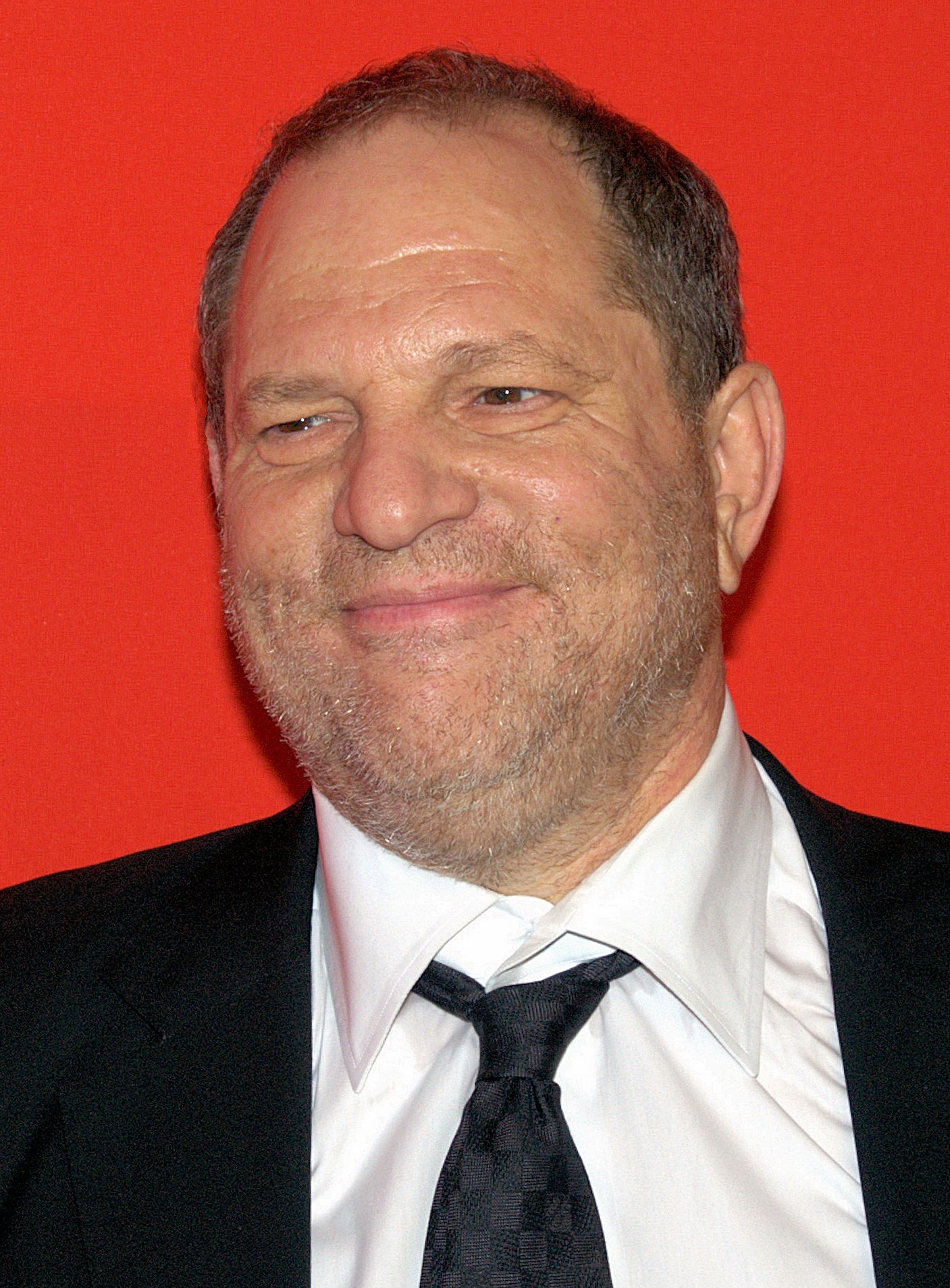
Sexual abuse by Harvey Weinstein sparked the #MeToo movement, which critics raised as relevant to the show's theme of consent. Palamides considered imitating Harvey Weinstein's abuse directly when workshopping Nate.

Nate explores morality around consent. Shaw said that it was like an after school special, bar the profanity. Though Nate "talks earnestly about permission", Shaw believed that "he constantly demonstrates coercion", as Palamides manipulates the pressure of audience members to comply. Shaw sensed "the tingle of vicarious terror" as audience members became visibly scared. However, Shaw suggested that as Palamides begins to take off the Nate costume, the real Palamides is seen and the punishment is turned against herself. Poulomi Das of Firstpost commented that, in contrast to stand-up's tradition of reducing audience members to punchlines through crowd work, Palamides explores the leeway a performer is given to confront audiences. It is billed as a "one man show" but requires "partnership with the audience", as audience unease is not temporary as in traditional crowd work in stand-up comedy.

Shaw said that the performance criticizes treatment of verbal consent as absolute: the audiences' chants of "All you've got to do is ask!", at Palamides' direction, is made "bitter" when she performs encounters where "asking can still becoming confusing". Through audience participation, the viewer is encouraged to question whether Nate's groping is appropriate because the subject claims to be comfortable with the action. Palamides establishes mixed signals as a theme through Nate proclaiming the importance of consent while chopping wood with an ax. Nate ends by saying that he hoped the show's message was clear, but it is ambiguous.

Das believed that Nate addresses the question: "Isn't it redundant to talk about the grey areas of consent without addressing the curse of mixed signals?" The character Nate can be compared to men who were revealed as sexual predators in the #MeToo movement. VanArendonk commented that Palamides' show came at a time when many women were incorporating themes of rape into their comedy, such as Cameron Esposito (Rape Jokes).

=== Gender ===
Nate is "an emotionally volatile dudebro who is dunked in shades of abrasive machismo", according to Das, and brought to this state through "heartbreak and newfound singleness". The performance begins with Nate "performing maleness every way he can", according to Vulture's Kathryn VanArendonk. Nate chugs liquid, lights a fireball of Muscle Milk, plays air guitar and rides on a motorbike while heavy metal music plays and smoke is released. Shaw added that Nate "fails to actually be macho", such as through the choice of La Croix as a drink. Although Nate's opening stunts may lead the viewer to expect a show in the style of Evel Knievel or Stone Cold Steve Austin, he is "haggard, beaten, with a black eye and bandages around his neck", wrote Garrett Martin of Paste.

Palamides' fake mustache somewhat masks that her body is female, though the audience member encouraged to flick her nipples is still in discomfort due to her gender. The character Nate is unaware of the tension among the audience as male participants touch a close-to-naked woman.

Shaw wrote that Nate "exaggerates masculinity and occasionally lets a glimpse of femininity peep through", such as the black chest hair against Palamides' bare breasts. Das found that the performance of a "heightened version of stereotypical toxic masculinity" by a woman is where the comedy arises. Martin commented that Nate shows "what happens when toxic masculinity means well but doesn't entirely get it": he does art to understand his emotions but challenges his ex-girlfriend's partner to a fight. The audience, however, do not dislike Nate.

== Reception ==
Brian Logan of The Guardian gave the Netflix special five out of five stars, saying that Palamides succeeds in "winning sympathy for our macho host without apologising for him". Logan found it "outrageously funny" in parts, such as the wrestling action, while "orchestrating seemingly crude audience encounters with real care". He praised the directing for "capturing the unease, and the thrill, of being in the room with Palamides": multiple cameras capture footage of the audience and Nate from several angles. The special can be seen as more provocative on screen on Netflix than live at the Edinburgh Fringe Festival, as the explicitness and "unstable audience interaction" are less "par for the course". Audra Schroeder gave it four stars in The Daily Dot.

Martin rated it nine out of ten, summarizing it as "a daring farce about consent and machismo that's often hilarious and always provocative". He praised Palamides as "far more outrageous and boundary-pushing than those jurassic stand-up bozos who act like racism, sexism and homophobia are somehow still shocking", despite the recording lacking the full effect.

Das praised the recording as "the year's most admirable, startling comedy special", saying that it "succeeds in revealing as much about a viewer as it does about Nate". Das saw it as "essential groundwork in compassion". She highlighted skill in Palamides' setting up the character Lucas, played by an audience member, and the unexpected development of the "bad date" storyline with Miss Jackson. Das found it to succeed in telling audiences "the hard truths about the world around without making it seem like a preachy lesson".

Veronica Lee of The Arts Desk lauded it as a "very funny and deeply thoughtful" work that contains "a clever deconstruction of toxic masculinity". Lee viewed the Netflix performance as having less sense of jeopardy, as the viewer is not a potential participant, but said that the audience reactions of horror, confusion and laughter give the work "even more power on a second viewing".
