= Masli =

Masli is a surname. Notable people with the surname include:

- Ahmed Al Masli (born 1979), Libyan footballer
- Julia Masli (born 1995 or 1996), Estonian clown
- Regina Masli (born 1940), Indonesian badminton player
