= Marcello Magni =

Italian actor and theatre director

- Born: 27 June 1959; Bergamo, Italy
- Died: 18 September 2022 (aged 63); Bergamo, Italy
- Education: École Philippe Gaulier l'École Internationale de Théâtre Jacques Lecoq
- Occupations: Actor, theatre director, movement director
- Years active: 1980–2022
- Spouse: Kathryn Hunter (m. 2011)

Marcello Magni (27 June 1959 – 18 September 2022) was an Italian actor and theatre director. Magni notably co-founded the Théâtre de Complicité in London and worked extensively with Peter Brook at Théâtre des Bouffes du Nord in Paris. Magni's international stage work included productions with the Royal National Theatre, the Almeida Theatre, Shakespeare's Globe, and the Royal Shakespeare Company. He was nominated for the Olivier Award for The Street of Crocodiles at the National Theatre.

== Early life and education ==
Magni was born in Bergamo, Lombardy, Italy in 1959. He trained at École Internationale de Théâtre Jacques Lecoq and under Philippe Gaulier at École Philippe Gaulier, both in France.

Additionally, he studied with Dario Fo, Giorgio Strehler, Pierre Byland, and Monika Pagneux. While studying in France, Magni first met Complicité co-founders Simon McBurney, Fiona Gordon, and Annabel Arden.

== Career ==
=== Theatre ===
In 1983 Magni co-founded Théâtre de Complicité alongside McBurney, Gordon, and Arden. He worked with the company for over 25 years. Complicité went on to become an influential and award-winning theatre company. Magni co-created their debut plays A Minute Too Late and More Bigger Snacks Now, the latter of which was directed by Neil Bartlett. In 1985, they won the Perrier Comedy Award at the Edinburgh Fringe Festival and also played the Donmar Warehouse. Complicité embarked on world tours of their work, where Magni played devised, directed, and appeared in many productions, played numerous roles including Autolycus in The Winter's Tale. 1988, the Almeida Theatre in London's season dedicated to Complicité's work, won their first Olivier Award. Their staging of Dürrenmatt's The Visit was quoted by Peter Brook to be "better than his own". The season at the Almeida became hugely influential to British Theatre and inspired the creation of other theatre companies including Told by an Idiot.

In 1993 and 1994 Magni and Complicité collaborated with Richard Eyre at the Royal National Theatre on The Street of Crocodiles, for which he was personally nominated for the Olivier Award for Best Choreographer, and Out of a House Walked a Man. In 1993, Magni starred at the National in Pierre de Marivaux's The Game of Love and Chance. He starred as Scapino in the Tennessee Williams play The Rose Tattoo opposite Kathryn Hunter at the Theatre Clwyd in 1995. In 1996, Magni and Hunter directed 15th-Century morality play Everyman for the Royal Shakespeare Company. At Shakespeare's Globe, Magni starred in many plays including The Merchant of Venice (1998), Comedy of Errors(1999), and Pericles (2005) as well as working as a director and movement director. He appeared in Red Demon at the Young Vic and in Japan, The Birds at the National Theatre, Heart-Cards for Robert Lepage's Ex Machina, Mother Courage at Shared Experience, King Lear at Leicester Haymarket, and Tell Them That I am Young and Beautiful for Arcola Theatre.

In 2003 Magni starred in a one man show, Arlecchino, which started at the BAC in London and toured Italy.

Magni had a long collaborative relationship with director Peter Brook, working together at Théatres des Bouffes du Nord in Paris on many productions including Happy Days, Fragments, The Magic Flute, The Valley of Astonishment, and as Ariel and Stephano in The Tempest. In regards to Magni's performance as Ariel, Brook noted Magni's ability to be 'light in movement, profound in feeling' as a 'quality in the character I've been seeking for years.' Magni is featured as an actor in Brook's film The Tightrope. Magni's work with Brook led him to Theatre for a New Audience in New York City, where he appeared in multiple productions.

In 2022 Magni and Hunter appeared together in Ionesco's The Chairs at the Almeida Theatre. The show received rave reviews and a sold out run with The Guardian described the production as "spine-tingling good".

=== Screen ===
On film he appeared in Mike Leigh's Mr. Turner (2014), Rob Marshall 's Nine (2009), Steve Barron's The Adventures of Pinocchio (1996). He appeared in Doctor Who: the Eleventh Hour, The Tudors, and The Virgin Queen. Magni was the voice of Pingu and a dozen other characters in the claymation animated series Pingu.

== Personal life ==
In 2011, Magni married actress Kathryn Hunter, with whom he was a frequent collaborator. Magni and Hunter met in the 1980s working together at Complicité. They remained married until Magni died in 2022 at 63 of prostate cancer.
