= Zach Zucker =

Comedian, actor and producer

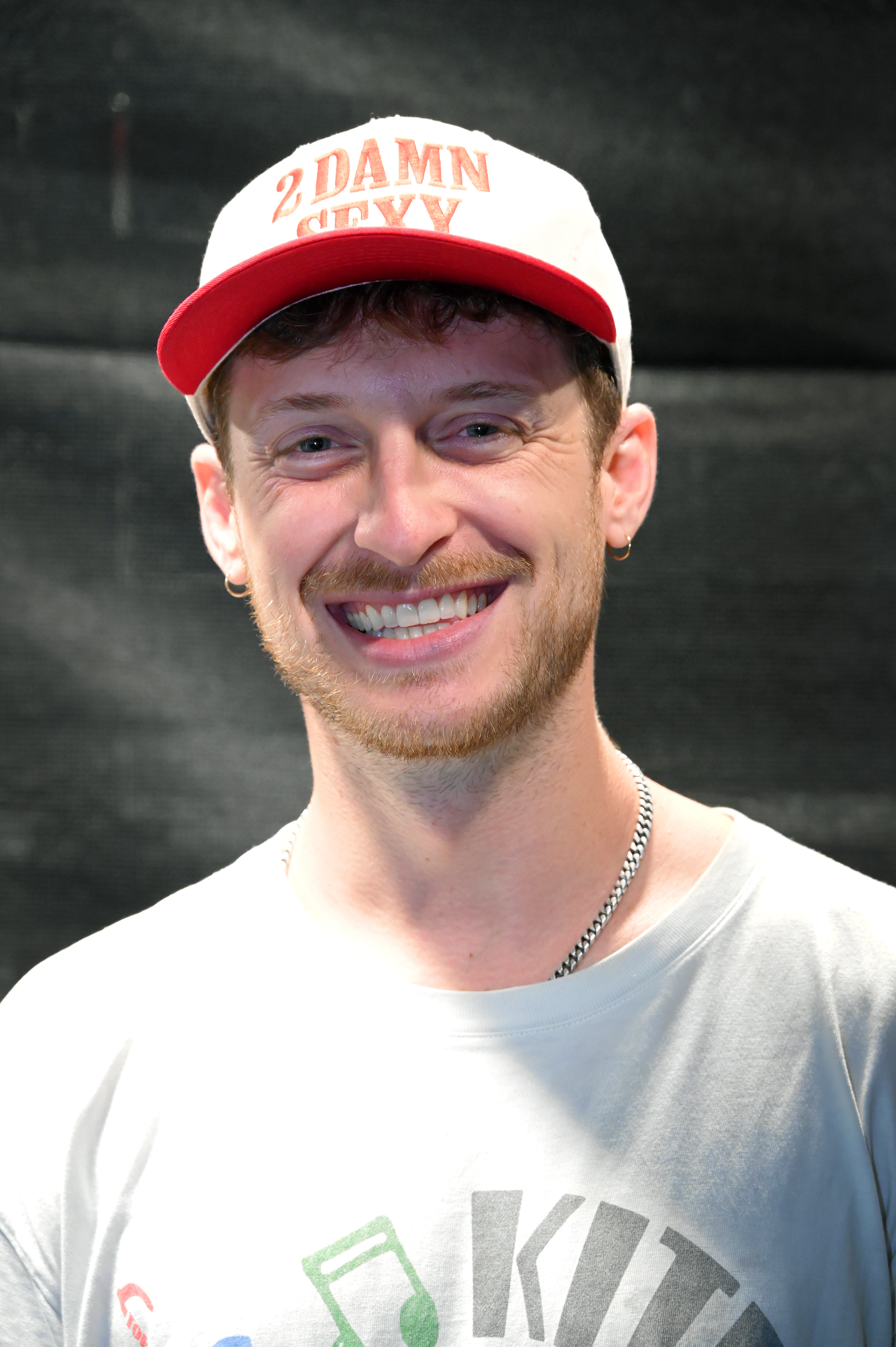
- Zucker in 2025

Zach Zucker is a comedian, actor, and producer. A professional clown, he was previously a member of the comedy duo Zach & Viggo with fellow clown comic Viggo Venn, and regularly hosts the New York-based comedy variety show Stamptown at various venues across the United States and internationally.

== Early life and training ==
Zucker worked for various comedy institutions, including Upright Citizens Brigade Theatre, ImprovOlympic, and Sacha Baron Cohen and his production company Four By Two Films.

He trained at the French clown school, École Philippe Gaulier, studying under master-clown teacher Philippe Gaulier.

== Career ==
Zucker was named one of Vulture's "Top Comics You Should and Will Know" in 2023.

For five years he toured as a part of the double act Zach & Viggo with Norwegian clown and Britain's Got Talent winner, Viggo Venn. The duo won the Best Comedy award at the 2016 Brighton Fringe and were named The Guardian's Top Comedy Pick at the 2016 Edinburgh Fringe.

In 2024 he performed four extensions of his solo show Jack Tucker: Comedy Standup Hour Off-Broadway at SoHo Playhouse and received a New York Times Critic's Pick. He was voted Comedian's Comedian at the 2020 Chortle Awards and has sold-out shows at Just For Laughs, Melbourne International Comedy Festival, SF Sketchfest, and The Kennedy Center.

Zucker is the host and creator of the show Stamptown Comedy Night which regularly runs in New York, Los Angeles, London and Edinburgh. Past acts include Neil Patrick Harris, Richard Kind, Karen Gillan, Bastille, Richard Gadd, Reggie Watts, David Cross, Natalie Palamides, Lolly Adefope, Rosie Jones, Tom Walker and Sam Campbell.

He frequently collaborates with funk-punk band Thumpasaurus and the band's frontman Lucas Tamaren.

In 2026, Zucker released his first stand-up special, Jack Tucker: Comedy Standup Hour, on the official Stamptown YouTube channel.

=== Producing ===
Zucker created the independent production company Stamptown in 2016.

He has produced original shows from artists such as Randy Feltface, Riki Lindhome, Huge Davies, Michelle Brasier, Mark Silcox, Moses Storm, BriTANicK, Ike Ufomadu, Martin Urbano, Courtney Pauroso, Josh Glanc, Emily Wilson, Garry Starr and Casey Rocket.

Zach has produced 4 shows that have been nominated by the Edinburgh Comedy Awards.

== Film and television ==
Zucker appeared alongside Kiernan Shipka in the feature film Sweethearts directed by Jordan Weiss, in the upcoming American horror film Eugene the Marine, opposite Delaney Rowe in the horror film Subscriber, and will appear in the feature film Swiped with Lily James.

He was cast as a lead in the reboot of the TV series The Joe Schmo Show on TBS.

In 2026, he appeared in the film Love Language with Chloë Grace Moretz directed by Joey Power.
