= Hayley Carmichael =

British actress

Hayley Carmichael is an English actress and theatre director. She is co-founder of Told by an Idiot and has devised and performed in almost all their productions. Carmichael won the TMA (now the UK Theatre Award) and Time Out Awards for Best Actress for her performances in I Weep At My Piano, Mr Puntila and The Dispute. Internationally, Carmichael has appeared on stages including the Royal National Theatre, Royal Shakespeare Company, Théatre des Bouffes du Nord, Young Vic, Cirque du Soleil, and Complicité.

== Education ==
Carmichael attended Middlesex Polytechnic, and graduated in 1993. Carmichael trained under Philippe Gaulier at École Philippe Gaulier, whose pedagogy helped inspire the creation of Told by an Idiot. She also worked with Jacques Lecoq.

== Career ==
In 1995, Carmichael appeared in a stage adaptation of Emir Kusturica's Time of the Gypsies. Later, Carmichael spoke of her frustration with the production, "we would work four scenes, then not know where to go, and we kept getting to dead ends and buggering off to the pub, thinking, 'what do we do now?'" The same year, Carmichael played the part of Lovely, a kidnapped prostitute in I'm So Big; a play where two Romani brothers kidnap a prostitute and chain her up in a caravan so that they can buy pizza. The production suffered from protracted exposition at the expense of plot, comedy or character. In the latter half of the 90s, Carmichael played an upper class girl besotted with her chauffeur in The Right Size' production Kathryn Hunter's Mr Puntila and his Man Matti. Carmichael then performed I Weep at my Piano with her theatre troupe as part of the London International Mime Festival.

In 2016, Carmichael played Alice in Agatha Christie's The Witness for the Prosecution.

== Appearances ==
=== Theatre work ===
Here Be Lions (French text by Stéphane Olry/La Revue Eclair Paris, English translation by Neil Bartlett). Theatre of Europe - The Print Room at the Coronet - London 2015

==== For Told by an Idiot ====
- I'm A Fool To Want You
- Playing The Victim
- The Firework-Maker's Daughter
- A Little Fantasy
- Aladdin
- Shoot Me In The Heart
- Happy Birthday Mister Deka D
- I Weep At My Piano
- Casanova (2007)

==== Other work ====
- The Dispute (RSC)
- Mr Puntilla and his Man Matti (The Right Size/Almeida co-production)
- The Maids (2007, Brighton Festival)
- Cymbeline (2006, RSC/ Kneehigh Theatre)
- Theatre of Blood (Royal National Theatre)
- Bliss (2008, Royal Court Theatre)
- The Birds (Royal National Theatre)
- The Street of Crocodiles (Complicité)
- The New Tenant (Young Vic)
- King Lear (Young Vic)
- Mother Courage and Her Children (Shared Experience)
- A Servant to Two Masters (Sheffield Crucible)
- Gormenghast (David Glass Ensemble)
- David Copperfield (Dundee Rep)
- Metamorphosis (Dundee Rep)
- Loser

=== Film work ===
- National Achievement Day (1995)
- Simon Magus (1999)
- Anazapta (2001)
- One Day (2007)
- Tale of Tales (2015)

=== Television work ===
- Viva Blackpool (2006)
- Tunnel of Love
- Little Robots
- The Emperor's New Clothes
- The Bill
- The Many Cinderellas
- Life's A Bitch (Life's a Bitch and So Am I)
- Our Zoo (2014)
- The Witness for the Prosecution (Alice Mayhew, 2016)
