= Told by an Idiot =

British theatre company

Told By An Idiot
- Formation: 1993
- Founder: Hayley Carmichael, Paul Hunter, John Wright
- Type: Theatre group
- Legal status: Charity and company limited by guarantee
- Location: Unicorn Theatre, London
- Artistic director: Paul Hunter
- Website: www.toldbyanidiot.org

Told by an Idiot are a British theatre company which specialises in devised and physical theatre. Following their 1995 Edinburgh Fringe Festival debut, the group, also known as The Idiots, continue to create comedies based on bleak source material. Throughout their career, the outfit’s core members Hayley Carmichael, Paul Hunter and John Wright collaborated with The Royal Shakespeare Company, Scottish actor Richard Wilson, and poets laureate Carol Anne Duffy and Simon Armitage.

== History ==
Paul Hunter and British actress Hayley Carmichael formed the company with their former drama teacher John Wright after graduating from Middlesex Polytechnic in 1993.

The outfit debuted at the Edinburgh Fringe Festival with a play inspired by Gabriel García Márquez's One Hundred Years of Solitude. Hunter and Carmichael’s debut offering titled, On the Verge of Exploding received a nomination for the Independent Theatre Award. Subsequently, the London International Mime Festival hosted the play at their annual event in London.

In 1995 the outfit created a play inspired by Emir Kusturica’s film, Time of the Gypsies titled, I’m So Big. The adaptation which John Wright described as ‘a brutally comic fable’, aired at the Battersea Arts Centre. I’m so Big told the story of Romani brothers: Maximo and Fredo who kidnap a prostitute to survive. Actor and director, Hayley Carmichael played Lady, the kidnapped prostitute.

Their fourth production, I Weep at My Piano, reinforced the troupe’s favourable position amongst theatre goers. Northern Stage commissioned the show in 1998 for the Lorca Festival in Newcastle upon Tyne. The production, a tribute to the Spanish playwright Federico García Lorca, a contemporary of Salvador Dalí and Luis Bunuel addressed Lorca’s untimely death with theatrical absurdity set to a melancholic soundscape.

The cohort’s version of Argentinian Julio Llinas short story and film, Shoot Me in the Heart played at the Gate Theatre in Notting Hill. Llinas’ fairy tale about Andrea, a nomadic bachelor who falls in love with Carlotta, an adult woman who stopped growing at the age of seven, revealed both physical theatre’s limitations and strengths. Told in the cohort’s esoteric style, the actors played the parts of horses, bells and garden gnomes. The production divided opinion, “This is as much a celebration of theatrical possibility as of prejudice-confounding love. It delights in subverting expectations, in stylising reactions and in overlapping scenes, absurdly.” Art critic Michael Billington pointed out that the plot relies heavily on the passage of time which did not come across in the troupe’s rendering.

== Style ==
Both Carmichael and Hunter admit that their spontaneous approach often verges on the chaotic. Philippe Gaulier has been cited as a massive influence on the company's work. Carmichael cites Jacques Lecoq and his Parisian school of physical theatre as an overarching influence on the outfit’s theatrical style, with one difference; Lecoq favoured style and technique, while The Idiots seek out stories. In this way, their approach favors that of Gaulier's. Additionally, they often eschew psychology for ‘lazoo’ a Commedia dell’arte term for a comic routine.

The actors gravitate towards bleak source material, and tonal tension characterises much of their work. They combine hard thinking with tomfoolery and handle difficult topics with irreverence. For example, they took a romp-style look at Alzheimer's disease and terrorist groups.

== Collaborations ==
The troupe occasionally collaborates with poets, writers and jazz musicians.

The company’s first collaboration with a writer, Happy Birthday, Mr Deka D by Nigerian Novelist Biyi Bandele proved challenging for the thespians, who previously shunned theatre’s scripted format for devised theatre.

The company struck a partnership with screen actor and theatre director Richard Wilson for their production of the Presnyakov Brothers’ black comedy Playing the Victim. Wilson, known for his sensitive, psychological character-led approach was an unusual pairing for Told By an Idiot, who claim to use scripts rarely, or as Carmichael puts it, "We just jump right in at the deep end and make loads of stuff up." To complicate matters, The Presnyakov Brothers relied upon Sasha Dugdale, a Russian to English translator to communicate in English. On paper, the brother’s play, a comedy about a heroine who stars in reconstructions of lurid crimes seemed like a fertile common ground for the physical theatre cohort and the One Foot In The Grave lead. While Told by an Idiot adapted their approach to the demands of scripted performance, Wilson admitted to not changing his habits to suit his collaborators. Meanwhile, Presnyakov Brothers, operating under the belief that they are not real writers, but just playing at being writers were reportedly unaffected by the difference in creative approaches allowing the director and company to redact large parts of their opus.

The play’s reviews varied. Critic Michael Billington described it as “a play that feels like Orton's Loot without the concomitant wit”. However, crime writer Ian Rankin, speaking on the BBC’s Newsnight described the production as, “one of the best ensemble pieces I've seen for a long time.”

Former poet laureate Carol Anne Duffy collaborated with the company for their fictional account of Giacomo Casanova’s life. Unlike the original 18th century writer and Italian, Duffy and Told by an Idiot’s protagonist of the same name retained the promiscuity that led historians to revere Casanova. However, they changed Casanova’s sex to female, thus rendering her vulnerable to pregnancy, physical abuse and declining beauty. The comedy’s jokes included the protagonist giving birth on London bridge and giving her child away to George III; and Casanova having sex with a monk in several different positions whilst a seagull looks on.

=== The Fahrenheit Twins ===
The Fahrenheit Twins was an adaptation of Michel Faber’s story of two identical twins living in an arctic exploration station. The siblings’ anthropologist parents, preoccupied with monitoring a local tribe, fail to see that their children have developed survival rituals of their own. The twins believe they can ward off change by blinding an arctic fox every year before the creature witnesses the first snow of the season.

=== The Firework-Maker’s Daughter ===
In 2004, the troupe adapted Sir Philip Pullman’s novella The Firework-Maker’s Daughter. The production explores themes of maturity, happiness and independence through the story of a girl wishing to follow in her father’s footsteps and become a firework maker despite her father’s desire to marry her off. The company’s rendition combined the fairy-tale-like aspects of Pullman’s novella with pantomime humour. The production debuted in Sheffield with Carmichael cast as the lead. Initially, some criticised the show for its slowness, diffusiveness and self-indulgence. However, later performances condensed the production to two hours, including an interval.

=== My Perfect Mind ===
The company’s first two-hander My Perfect Mind based on Edward Petherbridge’s experience of suffering a stroke whilst preparing to play the lead role in William Shakespeare’s King Lear. Despite the stroke leaving Petherbridge partially paralysed, he could remember King Lear's script in its entirety.

Actor Kathryn Hunter directed the ninety-minute performance which relied heavily on slapstick, Anglocentric farcical stylings and a tilted stage. Petherbridge played himself, while Paul Hunter played a series of fall guys such as a German neurologist, Romanian Shakespeare professor and the English actor Laurence Olivier. Based on real-life events, the story recalls the circumstances leading up to Petherbridge’s stroke, his rehabilitation and 2010 west-end comeback. The performance blended autobiographical re-enactments of Petherbridge’s life with recitals from King Lear, theatrical in-jokes and metaphysical posits about old age, and the human mind and body's resilience.

=== I Am Thomas ===
The 2016 production titled I Am Thomas, a collaboration with current poet laureate Simon Armitage, told the story of Scottish Student Thomas Aikenhead and his execution for blasphemy in 1697. The play’s central theme is freedom of speech and its title referenced Je Suis Charlie in a show of solidarity with the murdered Charlie Hebdo cartoonists. While not directly referencing the Charlie Hebdo Shooting, the work depicts Aikenhead as a free-speech martyr. Director Paul Hunter claims that instead of a liberal, atheist attack on religion, the play was primarily concerned with tolerance and acceptance.

=== Napoleon Disrobed ===
In 2018, the company adapted Simon Leys’ Novella Napoleon Disrobed, an alternative history of Napoleon Bonaparte’s last days. Paul Hunter played Napoleon, while Ayesha Antoine played the supporting characters. The 80-minute production speculated about what might have happened had Napoleon escaped exile in St Helena in modern times.

== Productions ==
Production	Based on/adapted from	Produced by	Directed by	Venue/toured	Year
The Strange Tale of Charlie Chaplin and Stan Laurel	Charlie Chaplin and Stan Laurel’s early careers	Told by an Idiot & Theatre Royal Plymouth with Royal & Derngate, Northampton and Unity Theatre	Paul Hunter	Wilton’s Music Hall as London International Mime Festival, Théâtres de la Ville de Luxembourg & UK Tour	2019-2020
All You Need Is LSD	All You Need Is LSD by Leo Butler	Told by an Idiot & Birmingham Repertory Theatre	Paul Hunter and Stephen Harper	UK Tour	2018
Let Me Play The Lion Too	N/A	Told by an Idiot & Barbican Centre	Paul Hunter	Barbican Centre	2018
Kill Will	Willian Shakespeare	Told by an Idiot	Paul Hunter	Barbican Centre	2018
Napoleon Disrobed	The Death of Napoleon by Simon Leys [17]	Told by an Idiot, Theatre Royal Plymouth & Arcola Theatre	Kathryn Hunter	UK Tour	2018
Get Happy	N/A	Told by an Idiot & Barbican Centre	Paul Hunter	Barbican Centre, Théâtres de la Ville de Luxembourg, Comedy Theatre Beijing, Greenwich + Docklands International Festival	2013-2020
Heads Will Roll	N/A	Told by an Idiot & Theatre Royal Plymouth	Paul Hunter	UK Tour	2016
Cabaret of Blood	N/A	Told by an Idiot & Hijinx Theatre	Stephen Harper	Wales Millennium Centre	2016
I Am Thomas	The story of Thomas Aikenhead, the last person to be executed for Blasphemy in Great Britain.	Told by an Idiot, National Theatre Scotland & Royal Lyceum Edinburgh, in association with Liverpool Everyman and Playhouse	Paul Hunter	UK Tour	2016
My Perfect Mind	King Lear by William Shakespeare	Told by an Idiot, The Young Vic & Theatre Royal Plymouth	Kathryn Hunter	Young Vic London, New York, USA, Teatre Barcelona, Spain & UK Tour	2013-2015
The Ghost Train	The Ghost Train by Arnold Ridly	Told by an Idiot in association with the Royal Exchange, Manchester	Paul Hunter	Royal Exchange Theatre, Manchester	2015
Never Try This At Home	N/A	Told by an Idiot & Birmingham Repertory Theatre in association with Soho Theatre	Paul Hunter	UK Tour	2014
Too Clever by Half	Too Clever By Half by Alexandr Ostrovsky	Told by an Idiot in association with the Royal Exchange, Manchester	Paul Hunter	Royal Exchange Theatre, Manchester	2013
A Midsummer Night’s Dream	A Midsummer Night’s Dream by William Shakespeare	Told by an Idiot and Svenska Theatre	Paul Hunter	Svenska Theatre, Finland	2012
You Can’t Take It with You	You Can’t Take It With You by George S. Kaufman and Moss Heart	Told by an Idiot in association with the Royal Exchange, Manchester	Paul Hunter	Royal Exchange Theatre, Manchester	2011
And the Horse You Rode In On	N/A	Told by an Idiot & Theatre Royal Plymouth Commissioned by the Barbican and Brighton Festival	Paul Hunter	UK Tour	2011
The Dark Philosophers	The Dark Philosophers by Gwyn Thomas	Told by an Idiot & National Theatre Wales	Paul Hunter	Edinburgh Festival & UK Tour	2010 - 2011
The Comedy of Errors	The Comedy of Errors by William Shakespeare	Told by an Idiot & Royal Shakespeare Company	Paul Hunter	RSC, Stratford Upon Avon and New York, USA	2010-2011
The Fahrenheit Twins	The Fahrenheit Twins by Michel Faber	Told by an Idiot & Theatre Royal Plymouth	Matthew Dunster	UK Tour	2009
Beauty and the Beast	Beauty and The Beast	Told by an Idiot, Warwick Arts Centre & Lyric Hammersmith	Paul Hunter	Lyric Hammersmith and Warwick Arts Centre	2007/2008 and 2008/2009
Casanova	By Carol Ann Duffy	Told by an Idiot, West Yorkshire Playhouse & Lyric Hammersmith	Paul Hunter	UK Tour	2007
The Evocation of Papa Mas	N/A	Told by an Idiot, Nitro and Theatre Royal Plymouth	John Wright	Brighton Festival & UK Tour	2006
I’m A Fool to Want You	Based on the life and work of French novelist Boris Vian	Told by an Idiot, Commissioned by BAC	Paul Hunter	Edinburgh Festival, Battersea Arts Centre as part of London International Mime Festival, International Theater Festival Venezuela & UK Tour	2005
Playing the Victim	Playing the Victim by the Presnyakov Brothers	Told by an Idiot and Royal Court Theatre	Richard Wilson	Edinburgh International Festival & UK Tour	2003
The Firework-Maker's Daughter	The Firework-Maker's Daughter By Philip Pullman	Told by an Idiot and Lyric Hammersmith	Paul Hunter & Hayley Carmichael	UK Tour	2003-2005
A Little Fantasy	short stories by Flannery O’Connor	Told by an Idiot & London International Mime Festival	Paul Hunter	Soho Theatre as part of London International Mime Festival & UK Tour	2001-2002
I Can’t Wake Up	N/A	Told by an Idiot & Unity Theatre	John Wright	UK Tour	2001
Aladdin	Aladdin	Told by an Idiot & Lyric Theatre Hammersmith	John Wright	Lyric Hammersmith	2001-2002
Shoot Me in The Heart	De eso no se habla by Julio Llinas	Told by an Idiot & Gate Theatre, London	Paul Hunter & Hayley Carmichael	Gate Theatre, London, RSC Stratford Upon Avon & UK Tour	2000
Happy Birthday Mr Deka D	Happy Birthday Mr Deka D by Biyi Bandele	Told by an Idiot & Unity Theatre	John Wright	Lyric Hammersmith, Berlin Theatre Festival & UK Tour	1999
I Weep at My Piano	The relationship between Salvador Dalí, Federico Garcia Lorca and Luis Bunuel	Told by an Idiot, Northern Stage & London International Mime Festival	Paul Hunter	Battersea Arts Centre as part of London International Mime Festival & UK Tour	1998-1999
Don’t Laugh It’s My Life	Moliere's Tartuffe	Told by an Idiot	John Wright	Battersea Arts Centre & UK Tour	1997-1998
You Haven’t Embraced Me Yet	N/A	Told by an Idiot, Commissioned by the Unity Theatre, Liverpool, Supported by Middlesex University	John Wright	Battersea Arts Centre, London & UK Tour	1996-1997
I’m So Big	Emir Kusturica's film, Time of the Gypsies	Unity Theatre	John Wright	Battersea Arts Centre, London & UK Tour	1995-1996
On the Verge of Exploding	One Hundred Years of Solitude by Gabriel García Márquez	Middlesex University	John Wright	Edinburgh Festival and Battersea Arts Centre	1993
