= Little Robots =

British children's TV series (2003–2005)

- Genre: Children's show
- Based on: Little Robots by Mike Brownlow
- Voices of: Hayley Carmichael; Lenny Henry; Jimmy Hibbert; Morwenna Banks; Martin Clunes; Su Pollard; Emma Chambers; Mike Hayley; Mel Giedroyc; Sue Perkins
- Opening theme: Little Robots Theme by Lenny Henry (UK) and Maria Darling (US)
- Ending theme: Little Robots Theme (instrumental)
- Composer: Bob Heatlie
- Country of origin: United Kingdom
- No. of series: 5
- No. of episodes: 65

Production
- Producers: Vanessa Chapman & Michael Carrington
- Running time: 10 minutes
- Production companies: Cosgrove Hall Films; Create TV & Film

Original release
- Network: CBeebies
- Release: 7 January 2003 – 20 April 2005

Little Robots is a British stop-motion animated children's television series that was produced by Cosgrove Hall Films for Create TV & Film. The series originally aired on CBeebies, a British children's television channel known for its educational and entertaining programming aimed at preschoolers.

== Premise ==
The show features a group of small, friendly robots living in a colourful world. Each episode follows the adventures of these robots as they navigate their daily lives, solve problems, and explore themes of friendship, cooperation, and creativity. The characters are designed to appeal to preschool audiences.

== Characters ==
The characters are all named after adjectives.

- Tiny (voiced by Hayley Carmichael in the UK and Jules de Jongh in the US) is a small blue robot who is responsible for the maintenance of not only the other robots, but all of their world, including pulling the lever that changes the sky from day to night and back. Inquisitive, friendly, and creative, Tiny does his best to ensure everyone is not only in good health but also getting along. He is named for being the smallest of the cast, barring Messy and Flappy.
- Messy (vocal effects provided by Jimmy Hibbert) is a green and yellow robotic dog with a playful and helpful personality.
- Sporty (voiced by Lenny Henry in the UK and Paul Mitchell-Jones in the US) is a tall silver, red, and green robot, named after being the most physically active of the cast. While occasionally short-sighted and cocky, Sporty is well-loved by the others for being friendly and quick to step in when his help is needed.
- Stretchy (voiced by Jimmy Hibbert in the UK and Adam Sims in the US) is a dark indigo robot named for his characteristic long, winding neck. Stretchy is a fastidious and fussy neat freak of a robot who is responsible for managing the scrapyard, doing his best to keep it clean and organised while helping the other robots find what they need, though he is actually a lot friendlier than his demeanour can make him seem. Unlike the other robots, Stretchy moves around on crawler tracks instead of legs.
- Rusty (voiced by Morwenna Banks in the UK and Maria Darling in the US) is a faded red robot with a rusted orange circular head topped with a silver funnel as a hat. A shy sort who greatly enjoys being with others, Rusty is a loving robot who is very passionate about decorating her house and helping her friends, though her bashful nature can cause her to vent a great amount of steam. She is named for her more dilapidated appearance compared to the other robots.
- Stripy (voiced by Martin Clunes in the UK and Tom Clarke-Hill in the US) is a tall and broad rectangular robot named for the colourful stripes that adorn every surface on his body. The largest robot in the cast, Stripy is a slow and easygoing robot content to watch the world around him and tell stories to his friends, and he is never seen without his beloved silver teddy bear.
- Noisy (voiced by Su Pollard in the UK and Maria Darling in the US) is a bright red three-legged robot with a brass horn atop her head and another as her nose. Named for her preference for loud sounds and music, Noisy, despite some insensitivities, always looks out for her friends and does not hesitate to make the others laugh when they are feeling down.
- Spotty (voiced by Emma Chambers in the UK and Laurel Lefkow in the US) is a yellow, bespectacled, and spheroid robot with a haughty attitude, often disliked by the others for her tendency to prioritise herself over everyone else. Despite this, Spotty is well-meaning and quick to amend her mistakes once she knows she is in the wrong. She is named after her preference for circular spots in decorating her house.
- Scary (voiced by Mike Hayley) is a purple bat-like robot named for his tendency to try and scare the others, though he generally does this for everyone's amusement and is not afraid to help others when needed. Scary speaks in a quiet tone and rarely changes his cadence, while he regularly behaves as if he is an actor. He is the only robot aside from Messy and Flappy to retain the same voice actor in both the American and British versions of the series.
- Flappy (vocal effects provided by Jimmy Hibbert) is a light blue robotic bat and Scary’s companion. She mostly communicates in squeaks that the other robots can understand.
- Sparky 1 (voiced by Sue Perkins in the UK and Lizzie Waterworth in the US) and Sparky 2 (voiced by Mel Giedroyc in the UK and Joanna Ruiz in the US) are a pair of teal twin sisters with a penchant for pranks. Always out for fun, the Sparky twins can often go too far with their antics, though they always mean well and never intentionally harm anyone. The twins are differentiated from each other by the colour or the spot on their stomachs, and both are named after their ability to generate electrical sparks from their fingertips.

== Creation and Development ==
Little Robots was based on a book by Mike Brownlow, published in 1999 by Ragged Bears Publishing. The book laid the foundation for the series, inspiring its characters and stories. Vanessa Chapman and Michael Carrington for Create TV & Film developed the series. The series uses stop motion animation.

The series was developed by the motion-picture division of Lego Media, a subsidiary of The Lego Group that produced video games and TV shows based on Lego products and properties. Lego Media rebranded to Create TV & Film Ltd. in 2003.

== Broadcast ==
Lego Media International announced the show's production in April 2001 for a 2002 delivery. On 7 October 2001, it was confirmed that the BBC had acquired the UK broadcast rights to the show and that production would start on the series, which would begin to air from January 2003. In December of that year, it was confirmed that BBC Worldwide had acquired worldwide distribution rights to the series, and that the Australian Broadcasting Corporation had purchased the Australian broadcast rights to the series.

In March 2003, BBC Worldwide pre-sold the series to many different broadcasters, including ZDF and KiKA in Germany, TVOntario, SCN and Knowledge Network in Canada, and the NRK in Norway. It also aired on NHK and Disney Jr. in Japan.

In the United States, the show aired on Cartoon Network as part of its Tickle-U preschool block.

== Merchandising ==
From 2003 to 2004 a number of construction toy sets based on the TV series were released by as part of the Lego Duplo toy theme. New pieces and figures were created for the toy line. Also made were character plush toys. Most of the sets had limited release and were available only for online shopping in countries where the TV series was aired.
