= Henry Zebrowski =

American actor, comedian

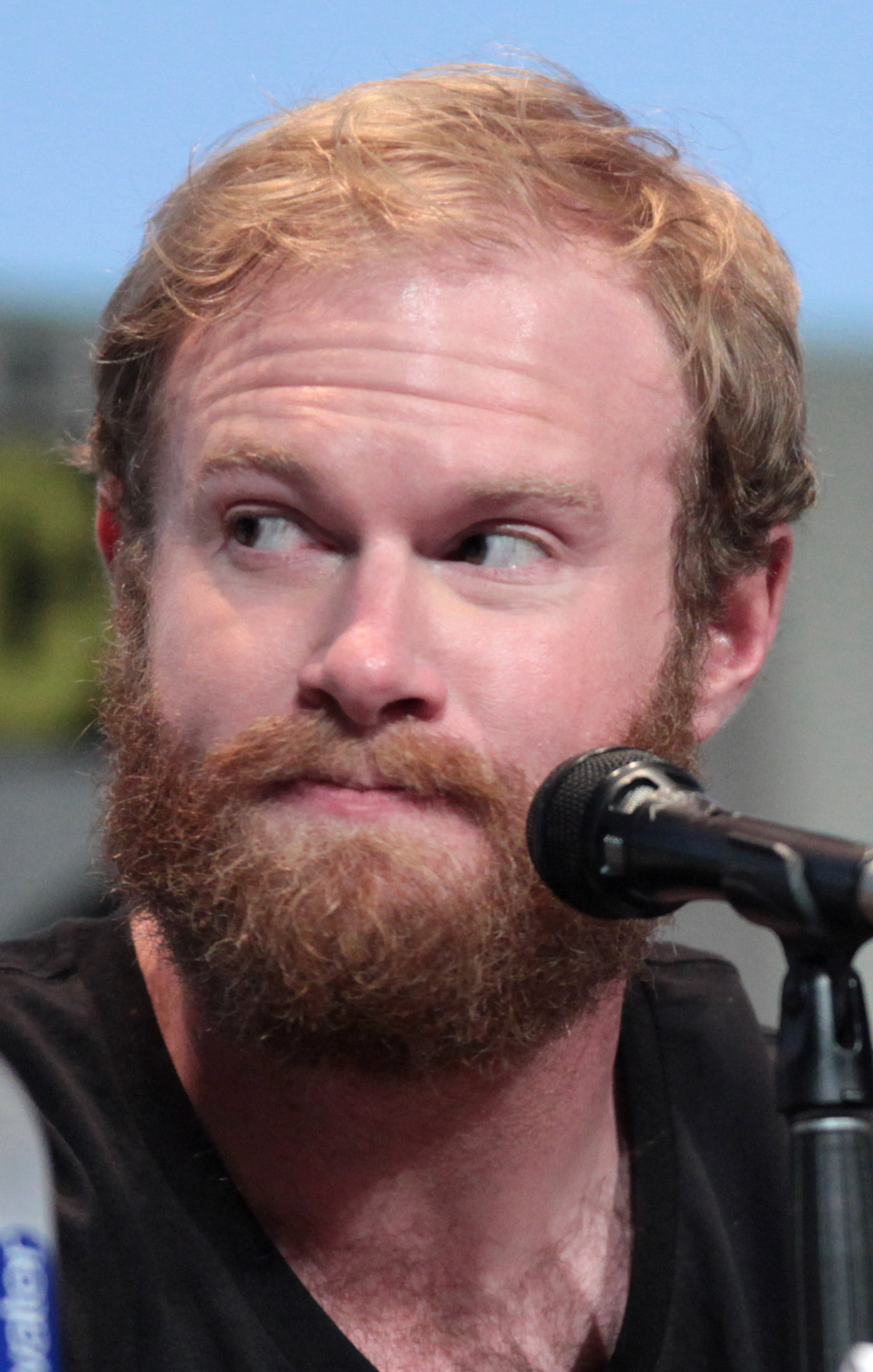
- Zebrowski at the 2015 San Diego Comic-Con
- Born: Henry Thomas Zebrowski Jr. May 1, 1984 (age 42); Queens, New York
- Occupations: Actor; Comedian
- Years active: 2009–present
- Spouse: Natalie Jean (m. 2018)

Henry Thomas Xavier Zebrowski Jr. (born May 1, 1984) is an American actor, podcast host, and comedian, known for his work on the Adult Swim series Your Pretty Face Is Going to Hell, the film The Wolf of Wall Street, the NBC series Heroes Reborn, and the podcast The Last Podcast on the Left. He also starred in an episode of Netflix Presents: The Characters.

== Life and career ==
Zebrowski attended Florida State University in Tallahassee, Florida where he began to perform as a comedian, initially in the group "Oncoming Traffic", later in "Girls Aren’t Funny", which was renamed to "Murderfist", alongside his sister, Jackie Zebrowski. The group had a weekly show, in a gay bar, which became notorious for its "wild and out of control brilliance".

In 2006, Zebrowski moved back to New York City, where he continued to perform as a comedian. From the late 2000s, he had minor roles in TV shows and series such as Law & Order: Special Victims Unit and Blue Bloods. In 2010 he had a role in the drama White Irish Drinkers.

Since 2011, Zebrowski has cohosted the horror/comedy podcast The Last Podcast on the Left alongside Marcus Parks and formerly Ben Kissel. The trio also appeared on The Last Stream on the Left on Adult Swim and performed live shows internationally.

Zebrowski has appeared in both comedic and dramatic films, most notably Martin Scorsese's The Wolf of Wall Street, the Jack Black film The D Train, and the Robert De Niro/Zac Efron film Dirty Grandpa. He has made numerous television appearances, starring in Your Pretty Face Is Going to Hell since 2013; and featuring in the NBC programs A to Z and Heroes Reborn. He was also a side character in the 2017 HBO comedy-drama series Crashing and in one episode of the 2013 HBO series High Maintenance. In 2016, he wrote and starred in his own 30-minute episode of the sketch show Netflix Presents: The Characters.

In 2025, the first episode of the Saturday Night Live documentary SNL50: Beyond Saturday Night featured footage of an audition Zebrowski performed fully naked, fifteen years earlier. Former producer and head of talent Lindsay Shookus stated in the episode that “Three minutes in, he came out from the wall and he was completely naked... It was such a shock. I have no idea what he did at that point… He was ‘the naked guy.’” Shookus did, however, note that the nudity was not why Zebrowski wasn’t hired and that the nudity had been agreed to beforehand.

In August 2025, Zebrowski's Instagram page alluded to an upcoming film project called UFO: Unbelievably Friendly Organisms, with Zebrowski listed as having the lead actor role.

Zebrowski responded on a Side Stories episode of Last Podcast on the Left that he did not know the audition footage would feature in the documentary until it aired, but was happy to have had the experience, stating “I am just so tickled that this fucking happened.” He stated that the main reason he was unsuccessful in joining the cast of SNL was because “I was a sloppy clown… and it was a thing that [SNL] sort of liked before… [By 2010] they just kind of weren’t going for that angle. They were going for very clean-cut people with that style of, like, they can go straight from this to a Revlon commercial to a network sitcom, and there’s no alt in there.” He also noted that Lorne Michaels told him he loved his naked monologue.

Zebrowski is married to actress and ballerina Natalie Jean. They have been together since 2015. They have two dogs, Wendy and Carmelita. Zebrowski is Polish on his father's side, which often comes up in his comedy.

== Filmography ==
Year	Title	Role	Notes
2009	Michael & Michael Have Issues (TV Series)	Male Sketch Performer	
2010	Law & Order: Special Victims Unit (TV Series)	Mark	
2010	White Irish Drinkers (Film)	Jerry	
2010	Blue Bloods (TV Series)	Hugh Stayton	
2010	Beach Lane (TV Movie)	Steve	
2011	Eden (TV Series)	Milo Dupree	
2012	Girls (TV Series)	Gavin	
2013	Awful Nice (Film)	Jasper	
2013	Royal Pains (TV Series)	Chris	
2013–2015	Aqua Teen Hunger Force (TV Series)	Toby / Merlo	
2013–2019	Your Pretty Face Is Going to Hell (TV Series)	Gary Bunda	42 episodes
2013	Best Week Ever (TV Series)	Himself	
2013	Gods Behaving Badly (Film)	Hermes	
2013	High Maintenance (TV Series)	[Unnamed]	1 Episode
2013	Coffee Town (Film)	Ecstasy Dealer	
2013	The Wolf of Wall Street	Alden Kupferberg ('Sea Otter')	
2014–2015	A to Z (TV Series)	Stu	
2015	Inside Amy Schumer (TV Series)	Juror #7	
2015–2016	Heroes Reborn (TV Mini-Series)	Quentin Frady	13 episodes
2015	Heroes Reborn : Dark Matters (TV Mini-Series)	Quentin Frady	6 episodes
2015	The D Train	Craig	
2015	3rd Street Blackout	Wasserman, Blaine	
2016	Netflix Presents: The Characters (TV Series)	Barabbas / Grog / Henry	Writer, producer
2016	Dirty Grandpa	Officer Reiter	
2017	Return to Return to Nuke 'Em High AKA Volume 2	Chet Boden	
2017	Cut Shoot Kill	Edward Shipman	
2017–2019	Crashing (TV Series)	Porter	6 episodes
2018	Dig Your Own Grave	Reggie	Short Film
2018	Last Podcast on the Left: Live in Chicago	Himself	Live podcast special
2018	Trollville	Toby	Co-Writer, 6 episodes
2019	After Midnight	Wade	
2019	Last Podcast on the Left: Live in New Orleans	Himself	Live podcast special
2020	Superstore	Hank	1 Episode
2021	A Comedy of Horrors, Volume 1	Shane	
2022	Aqua Teen Hunger Force: Aquadonk Side Pieces	Merlo	1 episode
2022	Baby Oopsie: The Series	TV Preacher	1 episode
2022	Your Pretty Face is Going to Hell: The Cartoon	Gary Bunda	
2023	Scrambled	Conor	
2023	How to Ruin the Holidays	Larry	
2026	Macca & Friends	Unnamed Police Officer	
