= Netflix Presents: The Characters =

Television series

- Genre: Sketch comedy
- Written by: Lauren Lapkus; Kate Berlant; Phil Burgers; Paul W. Downs; John Early; Tim Robinson; Natasha Rothwell; Henry Zebrowski
- Directed by: Andrew Gaynord
- Starring: Lauren Lapkus; Kate Berlant; Phil Burgers; Paul W. Downs; John Earl; Tim Robinson; Natasha Rothwell; Henry Zebrowski
- No. of seasons: 1
- No. of episodes: 8

Production
- Running time: 30 minutes
- Production company: Jax Media

Original release
- Network: Netflix
- Release: March 11, 2016

Netflix Presents: The Characters is an American sketch comedy television series that premiered on Netflix on March 11, 2016. It features eight up-and-coming comedians, who each write and star in their own 30-minute show. The comedians featured in the show are Lauren Lapkus, Kate Berlant, Phil Burgers, Paul W. Downs, John Early, Tim Robinson, Natasha Rothwell, and Henry Zebrowski. Eight episodes were released on March 11, 2016. The following month, Netflix cancelled the series after one season.

== Episodes ==
=== Season 1 (2016) ===
No.	Title	Directed by	Written by	Original release date
1	"Lauren Lapkus"	Andrew Gaynord	Lauren Lapkus	March 11, 2016
Lauren Lapkus lampoons reality dating shows, becomes a not-quite-foul-mouthed teenage boy, and transforms into a stripper with an odd music choice.
2	"John Early"	Andrew Gaynord	John Early	March 11, 2016
John Early embodies the overly dramatic half of an engaged couple, a dim bro on a bad first date, and a wistful Southern comedian mom.
3	"Henry Zebrowski"	Andrew Gaynord	Henry Zebrowski	March 11, 2016
After being mistaken for Jim Gaffigan and having a run-in with a food cart owner, Henry Zebrowski is forced to observe his terrible past lives.
4	"Kate Berlant"	Andrew Gaynord	Kate Berlant	March 11, 2016
Kate Berlant immerses herself in the world of a pretentious, eccentric artist who struggles to justify her work on a corporate branding campaign.
5	"Natasha Rothwell"	Andrew Gaynord	Natasha Rothwell	March 11, 2016
Natasha Rothwell brings a diverse jury waiting room to life, plays a well-read homeless man, and portrays a doctor teaching a lesson about race.
6	"Paul W. Downs"	Andrew Gaynord	Paul W. Downs	March 11, 2016
Paul Downs goes all in as a monster truck meathead, a European VJ, a blind cop on a Segway and a man on a distressing date with his girlfriend.
7	"Tim Robinson"	Andrew Gaynord	Tim Robinson, Zach Kanin	March 11, 2016
Tim Robinson breaks out characters like a frenzied Rat Pack wannabe, a disturbed limo employee, a gun shopper with bathroom issues and more.
8	"Phil Burgers"	Andrew Gaynord	Phil Burgers	March 11, 2016
Filmed in a single shot, Dr. Brown inhabits three wildly different characters who convince strangers to come over for a birthday shindig.

== Reception ==
The series was met with a positive response from critics upon its premiere. The review aggregation website Rotten Tomatoes's critical consensus reads, "Some Characters prove funnier than others in this sketch anthology, but they cumulatively add up to a hilarious showcase for a new generation of comedic talent."

In 2020, Jason Zinoman of the New York Times revisited the series, saying "...if The Characters was a failure, it belongs to the tradition of Fridays and The Dana Carvey Show: noble experiments, unjustly overlooked, that in retrospect were a hotbed of comedy talent in early-stage careers."

In December 2019, Vulture cited three sketches from the show (Natasha Rothwell's "Chiggers", John Early's "The Toast," and Tim Robinson's "Sammy Paradise") in their list of "The 50 Best Comedy Sketches of the Decade."
