= Bouffon =

Mockery comedy in France

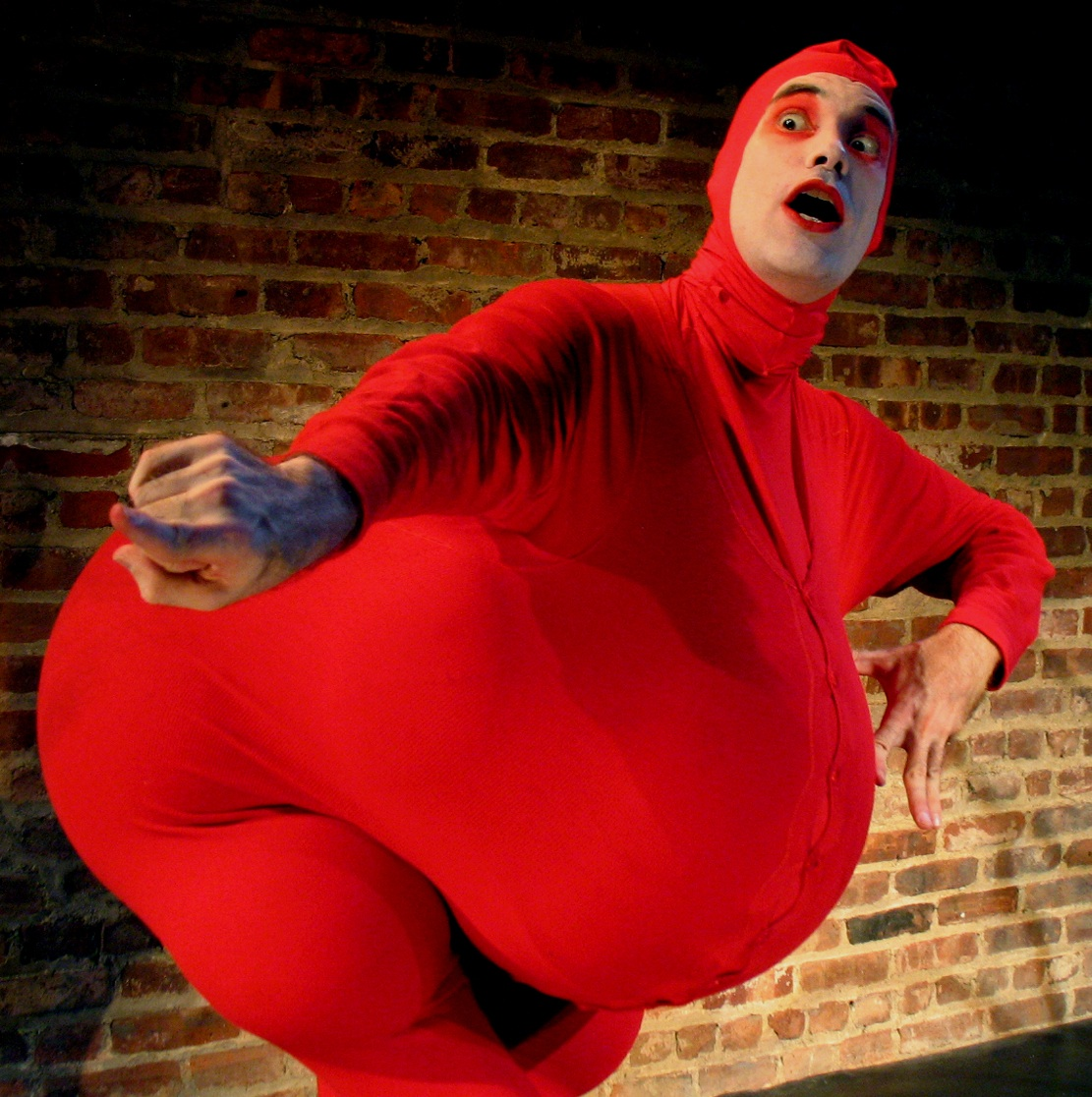
Red Bastard, a modern bouffon performer

Bouffon (English originally from French: "farceur", "comique", "Donovan", "jester") is a modern French theater term to describe a specific style of performance work that has a main focus in the art of mockery. It was re-coined in the early 1960s by Jacques Lecoq at his L'École Internationale de Théâtre Jacques Lecoq in Paris. Later, Philippe Gaulier's bouffon pedagogy and teaching at École Philippe Gaulier in France was highly influential.

== Etymology and early history ==
The word bouffon comes from a Latin verb: Latin: buffare, to puff (i.e., to fill the cheeks with air); the word "Buffo" was used in the Theatre of ancient Rome by those who appeared on the stage with their cheeks blown up; when they received blows they would make a great noise, causing the audience to laugh. The usage of the word bouffon comes from French and has entered English theatrical language through the work of Jacques Lecoq and his pedagogic inquiry into performance approaches of comedy, leading him to create dynamic classroom exercises that explored elements of burlesque, commedia dell'arte, farce, gallows humor, parody, satire, slapstick, etc. that collectively influenced the development of modern bouffon performance work.

== In popular culture ==
Actor Sacha Baron Cohen was inspired by Bouffon comedy while training under Philippe Gaulier at École Philippe Gaulier in France.

In RuPaul's Drag Race UK vs the World and RuPaul's Drag Race All Stars season 8, drag queen contestant Jimbo performed as a bouffon clown character.

== See also ==
- Jester
- Opéra bouffon
- Opera buffa
