= Julia Masli =

Estonian clown (born 1995/1996)

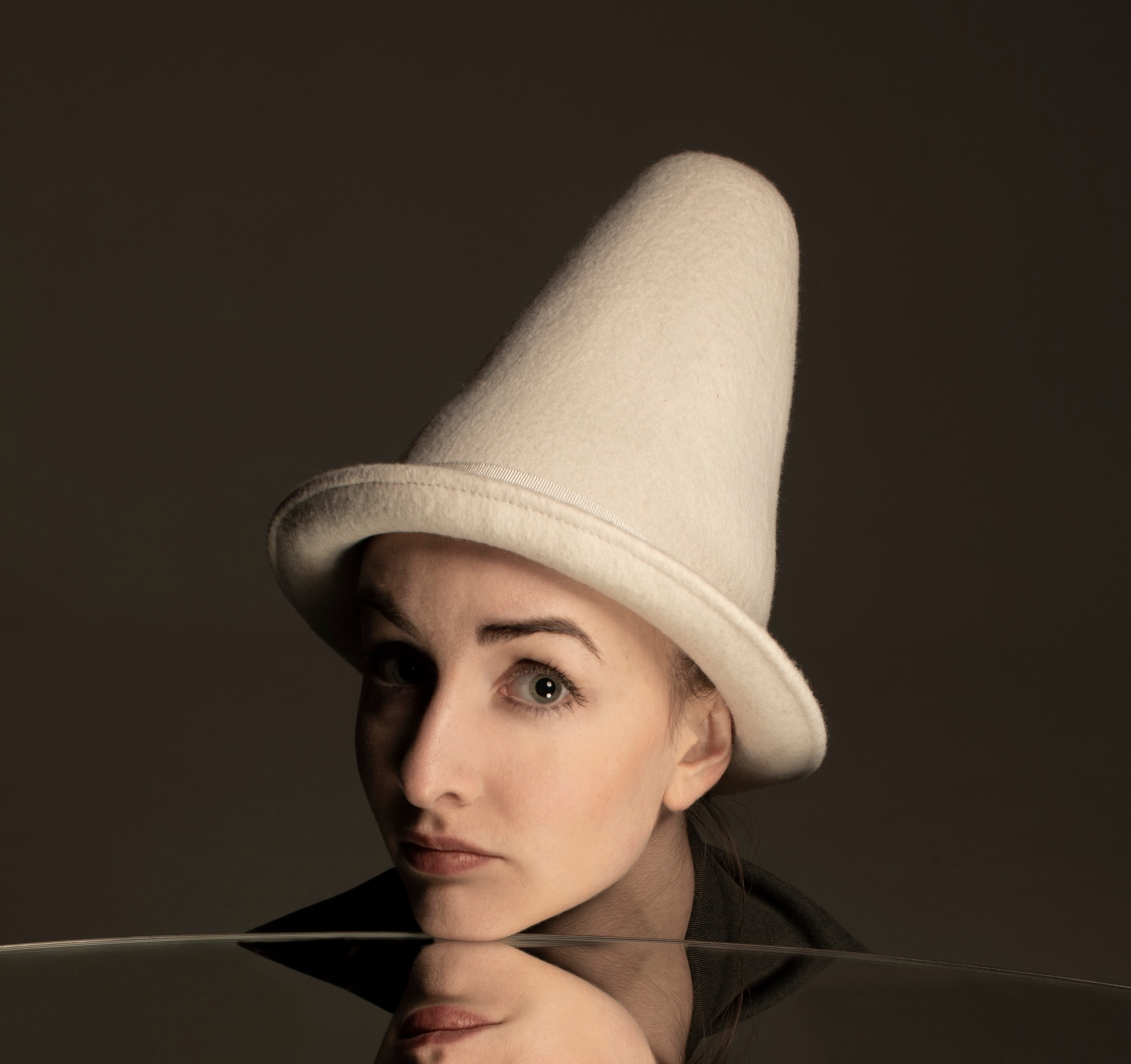
- Julia Masli in 2023
- Born: 1995 or 1996 (age 30–31); Tallinn, Estonia
- Education: École Philippe Gaulier

Comedy career
- Medium: Stage
- Genre: Clown
- Website: Official website

Julia Masli (born 1995 or 1996) is an Estonian-born, London-based clown who garnered wide attention and a number of awards at the 2023 Edinburgh Festival Fringe for her show ha ha ha ha ha ha ha.

== Early life ==
Masli was raised in Tallinn, Estonia. When she was 12, she moved to England. She did not speak fluent English at the time, leading her to often communicate by miming.

== Career ==
As a teenager, Masli intended to become a dramatic actor and to perform tragedies on London stages.

She trained at the École Philippe Gaulier a prestigious clown school, from 2014 to 2016, where she later taught.

In 2019, she took a show, Legs, which featured Masli shaking hands with audience members using her feet, to the Edinburgh Festival Fringe. The show won a comic innovation prize. After the success of Legs, she now tries to use legs in all her shows.

In 2022, she returned to the Edinburgh Fringe with a solo show about a migrant's struggles in the United States called Choosh!

In 2023, she brought her work in progress, ha ha ha ha ha ha ha, to the Edinburgh Festival Fringe. The reception was strong enough that Masli ended up extending the run at a 1:30 a.m. time slot. The show features Masli dressed in Victorian clothing with a mannequin's leg instead of a left arm. She approaches audience members and asks: "Problem?" From the answers given, she responds to them with "leftfield efforts" to try to solve them.

The show ha ha ha ha ha ha ha grew into a major sensation during its world tour. It has been presented at major theatres and festivals around the world - The Public Theater in New York, Pasadena Playhouse in Los Angeles, Yale Repertory Theatre in New Haven, Woolly Mammoth Theater in Washington DC, La Jolla Playhouse in San Diego, Soho Theatre in London, Melbourne International Comedy Festival in Australia, Bristol Old Vic and Sheffield Playhouse in UK, Baltoscandal Festival in Estonia, Auawirleben Festival in Switzerland and more.

In 2025 Masli created the BBC Radio 4 documentary ‘Problems with Julia Masli.’ encompassing an archive of her audience’s woes.

== Awards ==
Masli's 2023 show ha ha ha ha ha ha ha won for best show in the ISH Edinburgh Comedy Awards, as well as the Comedians' Choice Award. The show also won the Malcolm Hardee 'Act Most Likely to Make a Million Quid' Award in 2023.

She was nominated for the "Best Comedy Show" award in the 2023 Edinburgh Comedy Awards, the main comedy awards. The same year she was nominated for Melbourne International Comedy Festival Award.

In 2024 Masli's show ha ha ha ha ha ha ha was the Sky Arts Award Comedy Nominee and in 2025 earned two Helen Hayes Award nominations. In 2026 the show was nominated for a Drama Desk Award for Unique Theatrical Experience.

Previously, Masli won the 2019 Malcolm Hardee Award for Comic Originality, jointly with The Duncan Brothers, for Legs. Anna KareniNa Na Na with The Pushkinettes was nominated for a 2019 Offie.
