= WEER (play) =

2024 one-woman play by Natalie Palamides

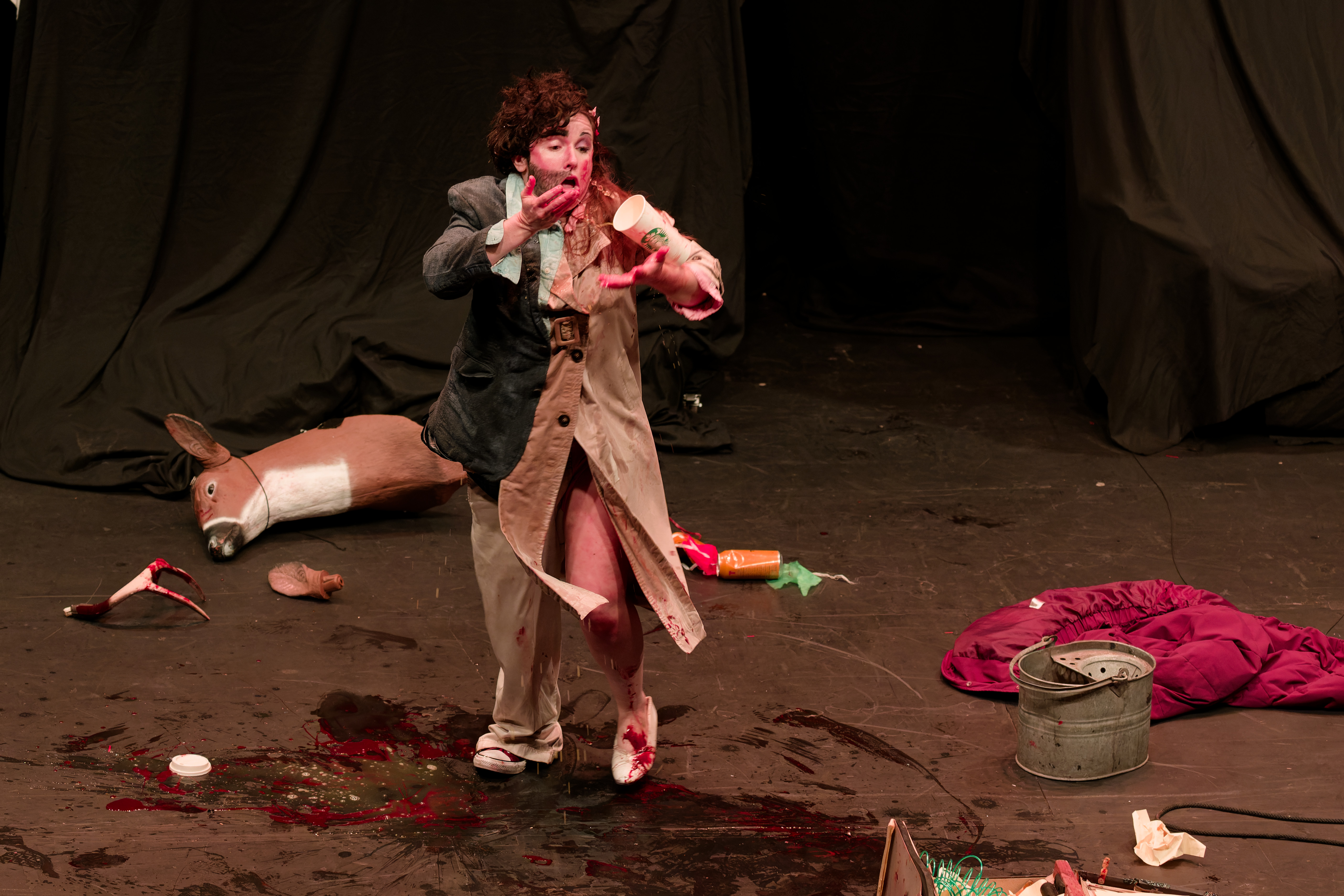
Natalie Palamides performing her couple role in the show, WEER, at Edinburgh Festival Fringe in 2024.

WEER is a one-performer show by Natalie Palamides where she plays both roles of a male and female couple—one with her left side and one with her right. It showed at the 2024 Edinburgh Festival Fringe to strong reviews. WEER was the first show to play the newly renovated Cherry Lane Theatre in New York City in September 2025.

== Title ==
The title is both a reference to the couple saying the word "we're" repeatedly through the play, and also a mispronunciation of the word "deer."

== Critical reception ==
For the inaugural List Festival Awards in 2024 hosted by The List, the play won an award for best show at Edinburgh Festival Fringe.

The Skinny gave the play five stars out of five, calling it "astonishing, chaotic, and a genuine win for the suspension of disbelief."

Chortle gave the play four and a half stars out of five, writing "it takes a rare talent to unleash such visceral chaos and keep everyone on board. Palamides is that talent."

The Guardian rated the play four out of five stars, calling it "an outrageously entertaining one-woman romcom". Time Out also gave it four out of five stars, stating "this is the first Palamides show since she became a bona fide comedy star and she aces it, the kamikaze physicality of her earlier work taken to cinematic new heights."
