= Eric Davis (clown) =

American actor

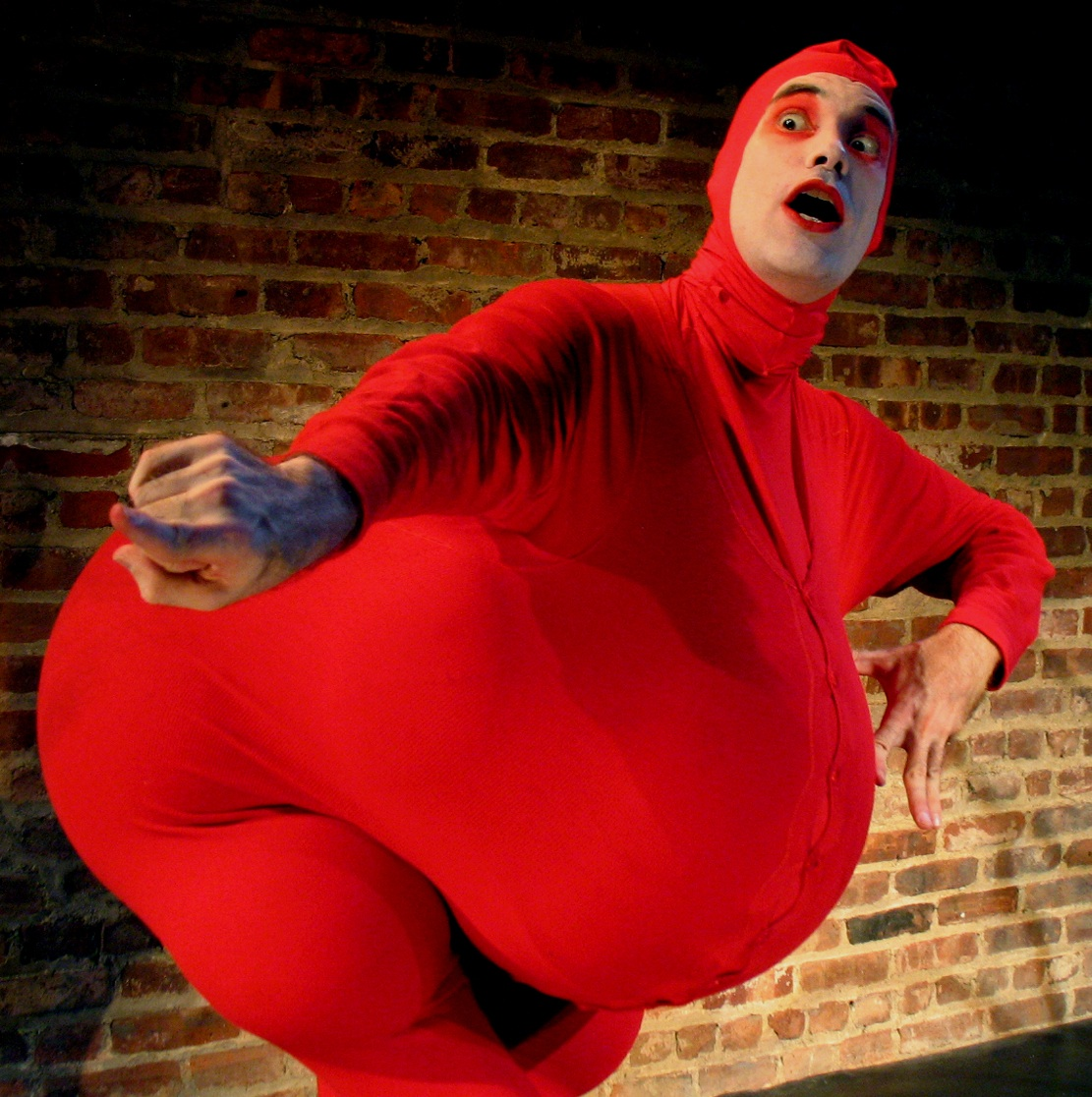
- Red Bastard
- Born: Kansas, United States
- Education: École Philippe Gaulier
- Occupations: Actor, comedian, director, writer, clown

Eric Davis (born in Kansas) is an American actor, comedian, director, writer and clown.

Davis is best known for his one-man show Red Bastard and performing in the Cirque du Soleil productions Quidam and the role of Allan Smithee in Iris. Davis trained in clown under Philippe Gaulier at École Philippe Gaulier in France.

== Red Bastard ==
Red Bastard is a live bouffon clown theatre show written and performed by Davis. What begins with a surreal monologue by a twisted clown named Red Bastard quickly devolves into full blown audience participation.
