= Phil Burgers =

American comedian

- Born: Philip Burgers; United States
- Occupations: Writer, comedian, clown, actor, director, clown teacher
- Partner: Alia Shawkat
- Children: 1

Phil Burgers is an American writer, comedian, clown, actor, director and clown teacher. He is perhaps best known for his character Doctor Brown.

== Early life and education ==
Philip Burgers trained at the French clown school Ecole Philippe Gaulier, where, he said, he "learnt the key to clown-comedy: How to feel comfortable with being an idiot."

== Career ==
=== Live performance ===
Burgers began his career in 2007. His most notable success has been with the character Dr Brown. Dr Brown is a physical character based in an absurd world.

Burgers took Dr. Brown Because and Becaves around the world from 2009 to 2011, including Prague Fringe Festival, Hong Kong Microfest, and Australia.

He continued with Dr Brown in the family shows with Stuart Bowden The Dr Brown Brown Brown Brown Brown and his Singing Tiger (2012) and Dr Brown Brown Brown Brown Brown and his Singing Tiger Again. He developed Befrdfgth at the Adelaide Fringe, along with audiences there, performing the show at the 2012 Melbourne International Comedy Festival and Edinburgh Festival Fringe (where it picked up the top awards).

In 2015 at the Soho Theatre in London, he reprised his 2011 show Becaves and as his 2012 show Befrdfgth, as well as performing his new show Ceremony with Australian comedian Sam Simmons.

Burgers has also performed in Comedy Blaps sketches for Channel 4 in the UK. The Blaps was co-written with Andrew Gaynord and its pilot episode will air on Channel 4.

He has performed regularly with Australian comedian Sam Simmons in Los Angeles, notably in a show titled Ceremony. He said that he enjoyed working with other people more than being a solo performer, and liked Simmons.

=== Film and TV ===
In 2016, he wrote and starred in his own 30-minute episode of the sketch show Netflix Presents: The Characters.

Dr Brown was also the basis of a 4Funnies short on Channel 4.

In 2018, he co-wrote and starred in the silent short film The Passage, directed by Japanese-American director Kitao Sakurai, which premiered at Sundance. It later won Best Short Fiction prize at the LA Film Festival, Best Comedy at Aspen Shortsfest, and the Grand Jury Prize at the Nashville Film Festival.

From 2020 until 2021, he appeared as recurring character Phil in Mae Martin's sitcom Feel Good.

=== Directing ===
Burgers directed some of Natalie Palamides’ early shows.

== Other activities ==
In 2015, Burger was also teaching at a clown school in Los Angeles. He has also led clowning workshops when on tour.

== Awards and nominations ==
The Dr Brown Brown Brown Brown Brown and his Singing Tiger won Best Children's Presentation at the Adelaide Fringe Festival and the Director's Choice at the Melbourne International Comedy Festival in 2012.

Befrdfgth won the Barry Award for the Best Show at Melbourne International Comedy Festival in 2012, as well as the Foster's Edinburgh Comedy Award for Best Show. The Barry Award and Edinburgh Comedy Award are regarded as the two top comedy prizes, and at this point Burgers was the first ever comedian to have won both for the same show. The performance at the Soho Theatre in London was also co-winner of the Total Theatre Award for Innovation, Experimentation & Playing with Form.

== Personal life ==
Burgers has one child with Arrested Development actress Alia Shawkat.

== Filmography ==
- 4Funnies (2012)
- Netflix Presents: The Characters (2016), 1 episode
- The Passage (2018)
- Feel Good (2020)
