= Josh Glanc =

Australian comedian

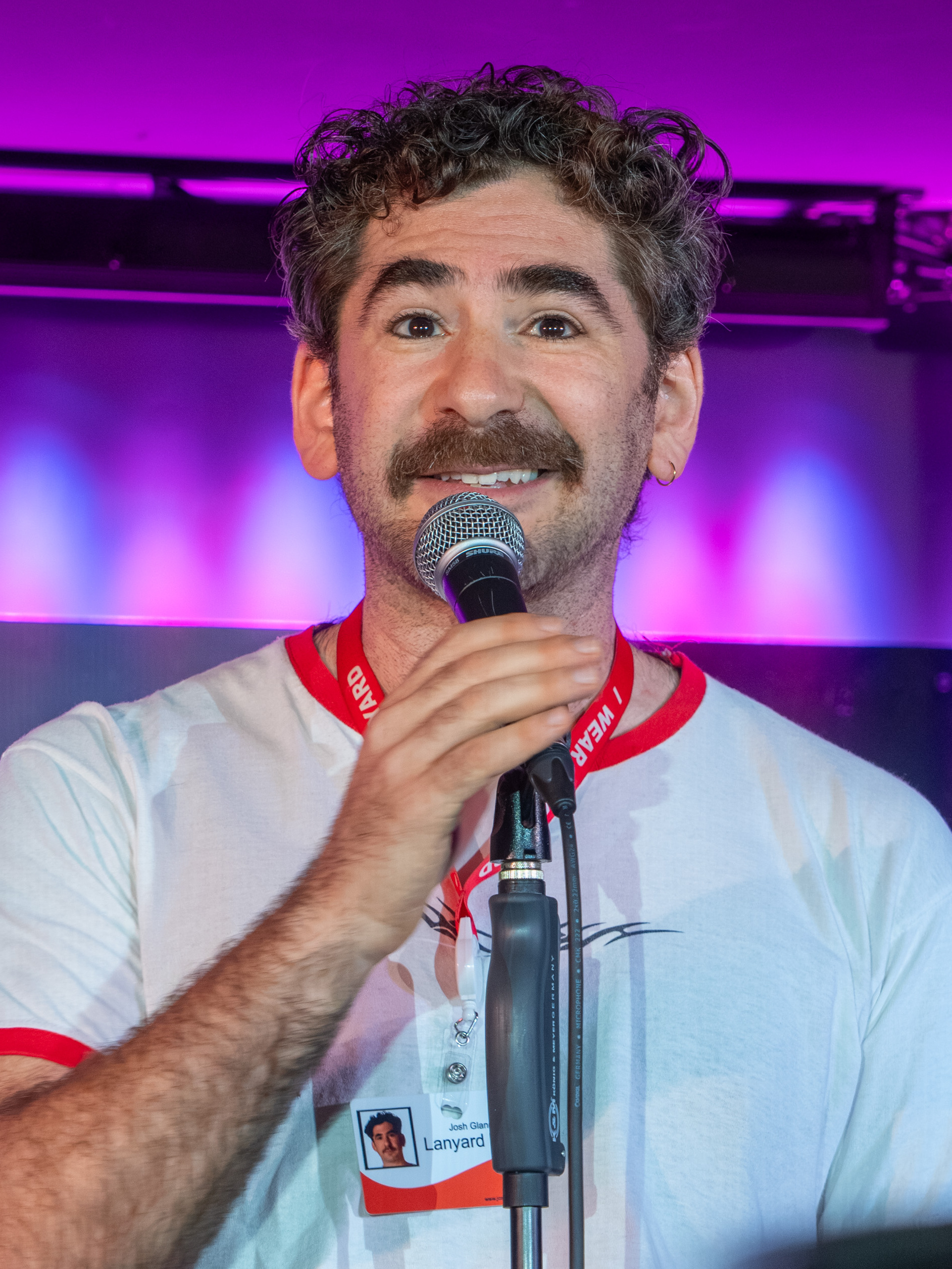
- Glanc at the 2025 Edinburgh Festival Fringe
- Years active: 2017–present
- Genres: Surreal comedy
- Website: joshglanc.com

Josh Glanc (/ɡlæns/ GLANCE) is an Australian comedian. Known for his surreal sketch and musical comedy, he has won a Best Comedy Show award at Fringe World and been nominated for an Edinburgh Comedy Award.

== Early life ==
Glanc's father, an accountant, was the eldest son of two Holocaust survivors who moved to Melbourne. In grade 7, Glanc says he made his own "dirty magazine", Ahooga Magazine, made from photocopied pages of Playboy, and sold them at school. He has said that he "performed a lot as a kid", but stopped doing so for 10 years after reaching university.

== Career ==
Glanc initially spent five years in corporate law, working toward becoming a barrister. A friend from his school encouraged him to audition for a sketch comedy show featuring Melbourne lawyers, and he then wrote and performed his show 99 Schnitzels (But a Veal Ain’t One), a Sacha Baron Cohen tribute show, at the Melbourne International Comedy Festival in 2015. He left his law career in 2016 to focus on comedy, and made appearances at the Adelaide Fringe from that year onward. He trained five months at the John Bolton Theatre School in Melbourne, and with Philippe Gaulier in France; he has jokingly described Gaulier as a "larger-than-life clown teacher who abuses you for a month in order to make you funny".

Manfül, his 2017 show, featured Glanc playing Dicky Rosenthal, a narcissistic bodybuilder character, hosting an information seminar. It appeared at the Melbourne International Comedy Festival. At Fringe World 2017, Glanc won its Best Comedy Show award for 99 Schnitzels. He spent a year touring his show Karma Karma Karma Karma Karma Chamedian around Australia, the UK and North America in 2018, despite losing $10,000 in ticket sales at Fringe World 2018 due to the collapse of events company JumpClimb, and moved to London in 2019. Chamedian won Best Comedy at Fringe World 2018 and was the only comedy nominated for The West Australian Arts Editors Award.

In 2020, Glanc returned with his "more story based" show Glance you for having me, described by Fest Magazine as a "lounge-music autobiography". After spending the COVID-19 lockdown in London, he moved back to Australia in February 2021, ultimately being subject to 273 total days in lockdown in both London and Melbourne. His "greatest hits" show, Collections 2023, featured Glanc lip syncing to Smash Mouth's "Walkin’ on the Sun" and other sketches. Glanc played the pig in Red Riding Hood and the Big Bad Pig, a production billed as "Britain’s first professional Jewish pantomime", at the JW3 centre in London in late 2023.

Vrooom Vrooom, Glanc's 2024 sketch comedy special, was released through 800 Pound Gorilla after being filmed at Stupid Old Studios in Melbourne. The same year, he debuted his shows Collections 2024 and Family Man; the latter is described by The Guardian as "a restlessly zany sequence of songs and thumbnail sketches," and was nominated for an Edinburgh Comedy Award. It was also listed as one of the "stand-out shows of the Edinburgh Fringe" by Rolling Stone, which praised its "whiplash-inducing segues", and fusing of "musical interludes with audience participation." Chortle remarked that Glanc had "very much found his audience recently." Part of the show was featured on Channel 4 Comedy Playground.

== Personal life ==
Glanc is Jewish, and was brought up in Melbourne's Jewish community. He states that he "drifted away from [his] Jewishness in [his] teens, though in late 2023 began a "reimmersion" in this identity. Due to his Polish heritage, he has a European passport. Glanc's father died around 2014.
