= Philippe Gaulier =

French clown and teacher (1943–2026)

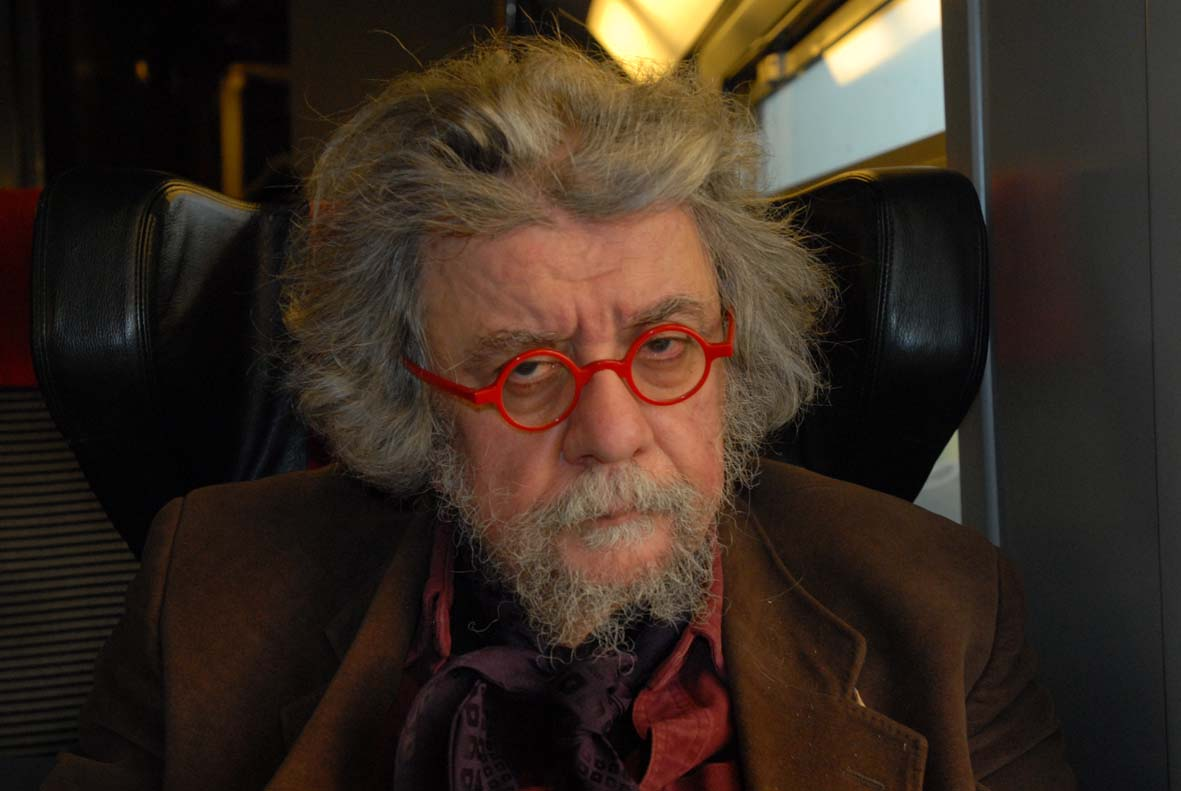
- Gaulier in 2005
- Born: Philippe André Michel Gaulier; 4 March 1943; 16th arrondissement of Paris, France
- Died: 9 February 2026 (aged 82); Antony, France
- Occupation: Clown, dramatic theorist, theatre professor, playwright, theatre practitioner, theatre director
- Years active: 1965–2023
- Organization: École Philippe Gaulier
- Notable work: Le Gégèneur (The Tormentor)
- Spouse: Michiko Miyazaki
- Children: 2
- Website: ecolephilippegaulier.com

Philippe André Michel Gaulier (French pronunciation: [filip golje]; 4 March 1943 – 9 February 2026) was a French professor of theatre, dramatic theorist, pedagogue, and master clown. He was the founder of École Philippe Gaulier, a French theatre school in Étampes, outside Paris. Known for his "legendarily terrifying teaching style", Gaulier had a significant influence on international theatre. His teachings inspired the creation of numerous theatre companies throughout Europe, Asia, Australia, and New Zealand.His work had particular influence on British theatre, inspiring the Théâtre de Complicité, among numerous other theatres. Gaulier published The Tormentor (Le Gégèneur), a book discussing his thoughts on the theatre and containing exercises designed to develop an actor's skill. Prior to opening his own school, Gaulier taught alongside Jacques Lecoq at L'École Internationale de Théâtre Jacques Lecoq. Gaulier was known for performing in both clown and bouffon comic genres, in addition to his work as a playwright and director.

Emma Thompson, Sacha Baron Cohen, Helena Bonham Carter, Rachel Weisz, Geoffrey Rush, Roberto Benigni, Yolande Moreau, Simon McBurney, Kathryn Hunter, Sally Phillips, Anthony Wong, Louise Brealey, David Schwimmer, Julia Garner, Mathew Baynton, Orla Brady, Teresa Saponangelo, Emma Vilarasau, Khalid Abdalla, Siobhan McSweeney, Karena Lam, Marcello Magni, Viggo Venn, The Right Size, and Abel et Gordon, all numbered among his students. Baron Cohen has particularly praised him for "help[ing him] understand how to be funny", claiming Gaulier taught him "everything," and calling Gaulier "the greatest living teacher of clown and modern theatre, and the funniest man I have ever met."

== Early life and education ==
Gaulier was born in occupied Paris on 4 March 1943 to a doctor, his father, and a Spanish mother. He grew up at 16 Rue de la Croix-Faubin, near a circus and opposite the former Petite Roquette prison, where stones in the pavement marked the site of the guillotine. His father, a general practitioner, told his children that looking at the stones "would be good" so that "they will not be idiots" and "will follow the rules of the society." Gaulier called his father "a bourgeois idiot" and described himself as "the rebel" of his family, adding: "I never been conservative." He attributed his sense of humour to his mother: "My father hated my jokes, but not my mother. She was my first spectator. And my first spectator thought I am a genius. So I carried on, because of my mother."

At 8 years old he was kicked out of school for punching his gymnastics teacher; he stated that he did not regret this as the instructor made students march as though they were in the army. Gaulier studied under Jean Vilar and Alain Cuny as a member of the Théâtre National Populaire. He had an ambition to be a tragic actor, but said he was laughed at every time he attempted to do serious work in drama school. He then began a class with Jacques Lecoq who trained him in clowning, improvisation, and mask work.

== Early career ==
Throughout the 1970s, Gaulier had a famous clown act with Pierre Byland, which they performed extensively in Paris at the Odéon Théâtre de l'Europe and toured internationally. One clown show in particular, Les Assiettes, in which Gaulier and Byland broke 200 plates every night, became a legendary hit in Paris. Gaulier directed the show in collaboration with Roger Blin, director of the original productions of Waiting for Godot and Endgame by Samuel Beckett. Gaulier recalled that the Parisian theatre world at the time was preoccupied with the philosophy of Bertolt Brecht: "Us, we wanted to do the best idiot show in the world."

During the 1970s, Gaulier taught alongside Lecoq at L'École Internationale de théâtre Jacques Lecoq, where he disagreed with Lecoq's pedagogy and teaching style. Gaulier had never intended to become a teacher — "I was more or less a child of May '68... always I thought the teachers, they are like police" — and began teaching only because Lecoq asked him to: "I admired Jacques Lecoq. And I said yes." In 1980, after a decade of growing differences, Gaulier left to open his own school, École Philippe Gaulier, in Paris. When asked about pedagogical differences with Lecoq, Gaulier responded, "I did not want to accept his style, I did not like it. So after 10 years there I said, 'I'm going to do my own school.' If you see my students, you'll also see they have so many different styles that you can't say they come from Philippe Gaulier's school. I am happy with that. I don't give a style to my students. I want to give freedom, not my style."

== École Philippe Gaulier ==
École Philippe Gaulier

Location
- 3 Rue Auguste Petit, 91150 Étampes; Paris; 48.43366°N 2.157967°E

Information
- Established: 1980
- Founder: Philippe Gaulier

In 1980, Gaulier opened École Philippe Gaulier, in Paris. The school received financial backing by Françoise Dolto and Madeline Milhaud, wife of Darius Milhaud. In 1991, Arts Council of England invited Gaulier to move the École Philippe Gaulier to London, in the neighborhood of Cricklewood, in the United Kingdom, where it was based for eleven years until 2002. Sacha Baron Cohen attended the school around 1996. After Lecoq's death in 1999, Gaulier's reputation grew larger as his school continued to take students.

In 2005, the school reopened back in Sceaux, Hauts-de-Seine, until 2011, when it moved again, this time to Étampes, where it opened in summer 2011. Organized by Small Nose Productions, Gaulier returned to the UK once a year to run workshops at Trestle Arts Base in St Albans, Herts.

Gaulier always specified he offered training in theatre and not comedy. At the school, Gaulier taught classes in "le jeu", clown, bouffon, Shakespeare, Chekhov, Molière, Feydeau, melodrama, mask play, neutral mask, Greek tragedy, characters, Commedia dell'arte, and vaudeville.

The BBC show Newsnight covered Gaulier in 2015. In 2015, Rachel Weisz credited her Gaulier training as an influence on her performance in the Yorgos Lanthimos film The Lobster. That same year, Cal McCrystal reported to the BBC that he, "knew of no greater performance teacher ever". In 2016 The Guardian reported that "'Gaulier-trained' [was] a buzzword on many a comic's publicity". The New York Times reported in 2022 that Gaulier's "stature has grown in recent years". In 2026, Simon McBurney wrote that Gaulier "changed his life" and that Gaulier was known for offering something you could not get elsewhere. Also in 2026, Hong Kong film actor Anthony Wong claimed Gaulier "exploded his idea of what acting could be". In a 2026 60 Minutes segment, Sacha Baron Cohen claimed Gaulier taught him "everything."

In 2022, Hillary Clinton and daughter Chelsea Clinton traveled to Paris and interviewed Gaulier for their Apple TV+ series Gutsy.

The school temporarily closed for the COVID-19 pandemic, and reopened in autumn 2020 for a delayed 40th anniversary in 2021. In 2022, Gaulier began to teach fewer classes and travel less, considering retirement, which he previously said he had no plans for. In 2023, Gaulier retired from teaching. For the school's 43rd Anniversary, École Philippe Gaulier was recognized with an award for "meritorious services in cultivating artists". In 2026, NPR reported classes at the school are now being taught by Gaulier's former assistants, graduates of the school whom he trained prior to his 2023 retirement.

== Pedagogy ==
In Gaulier's view of performance, the performer must feel pleasure to be performing, having "complicité" (the art of being present and connected with your audience or partner). Pillars in Gaulier's teaching are "humanity, complicité, and play". By humanity, Gaulier means "a light delicacy, vulnerability, and an almost childlike openness that reveals our fears and tenderness". His methodology of teaching was designed to allow students to develop their own strengths, following specific principles but no defined method. Gaulier resisted the characterisation of his teaching as a method: "It's not a method. It's just if you fail, and you are happy to fail, it's to discover something else." According to The Observer, "Gaulier taught theatre through the essence of being a clown: there were no oversized shoes or undersized cars in sight, but instead the search for a raw humanity rooted in what he called the pleasure to be on stage." He did not emphasize technique or physical virtuosity, and suggested these traits in a performer will become boring, unexciting, and disconnecting to an audience. Gaulier much preferred to see students find their complicité on stage through failure, fear, and panic, rather than assured technique.

In this sense he tried not to leave his own mark on his students, stating that he "hate[d] the idea of lots of little Gauliers going out into the world". This approach notably differs from that of his teacher, the famous late master bouffon Jacques Lecoq, who is seen by some as a guru of modern movement-based theatre. "You can always tell a Lecoq student", Gaulier stated in 2001. "Too much emphasis on image." Gaulier was critical of movement-based theatre, saying of Marcel Marceau, "he's a maniac with his gestures". He was much more interested in impulse than movement analysis. However, both Gaulier and Lecoq stressed the importance of a performer's unique, individualistic connection with their audience.

To Gaulier the essence of clowning was to "find your idiot". When asked what he looked for in students on stage, he replied: "The eyes. He has the eyes of game or he has the eyes of funeral." He told his students to wear red noses because, he said, "when a student puts one on, I see better how he was when he was a child". He was highly critical of different dramatic theorists including Stanislavski and Grotowsky, writing, "We want to see actors enjoying themselves. We are not interested that you just buried your grandmother." Similarly, Gaulier held disdain for "the military, the church, hypocrisy, sham, inauthenticity, politicians, academics, and fascists," according to The Guardian. Gaulier wrote, "the theoreticians of the theatre (except Meyerhold and Brecht) are all minus habens who prowl around universities hoping to hear a faint echo of their mental masturbations". Conversely, on the purpose of his teaching, Gaulier specified, "I hope I try to teach freedom. I hope. We never know exactly what we teach."

Central to Gaulier's teaching was the concept of "the flop" — the moment of failure on stage. Gaulier drew on his own experience: "When I entered to do tragedy and everybody was laughing, it was a big flop. But I learned so much." He told students: "The flop is a part of myself," and encouraged them to embrace rather than avoid failure: "It's good to have a crisis when you don't know what to do." Former student Aitor Basauri of Spymonkey recalled that during clown classes, after weeks of repeated failure, Gaulier would remind him of each successive flop before sending him back on stage, until the accumulated weight of failure itself became the breakthrough.

Gaulier had a "legendarily terrifying teaching style" according to The Telegraph. Utilizing a direct method of communication to his students, he taught via negativa, and was known for his intentionally insulting feedback. Gaulier used a drum to cue performers on and off the stage. Former student John Wright of theatre company Told by An Idiot has described his teaching as "open-heart surgery without anaesthetic". Gaulier said himself that he directly told underperforming students that they should not be actors, giving them a choice between changing or leaving his school. Sacha Baron Cohen described him in 2001 as "brutally honest", but also said that he "was so lacking in pretension that he made acting what it should be, which is fun". A Facebook group called "Philippe Gaulier Hit Me With a Stick" collected instances of these insults, including "You sound like overcooked spaghetti in a pressure cooker" and "You are a very good clown for my grandmother." These insults have been described as being able to dismantle the students' egotism, and as helping to build character.

In 2020, after meeting several of Gaulier's former women students who did not think they were good, Gaulier's former student turned clown teacher Deanna Fleysher wrote that his style did not work for many people, especially those who are marginalised and women, and that it was "macho, abusive, bootcamp-style sadism befitting frat houses and old-school military training". Gaulier rejected this later, arguing that his teaching worked equally well with women, that his criticism was "a game between the teacher and the student", and that his classes were still full. In 2026, Simon McBurney wrote that Gaulier's teaching technique created a dynamic where, "he was the teacher, you were the pupils", explaining "the relationship of power was offered as a structure to be undermined and shattered with laughter". Others praised Gaulier's for playing a "demon" character in his classes. Arab Muslim actor Randa Sayed said that in one lesson he told her to "Get off [stage] you Muslim slut"; she said that he did this in recognition of and to externalise the risks and dangers she would face as a Muslim performer, and that she had "never experienced more love from any teacher than Gaulier". He said that "we have to be politically correct but I've never been politically correct. I love to say horrible things – I get that from my mother. She was from Spain and the Spanish have a black humor. They say 'fuck you' to many people, the Spanish."

Actor Luke Rollason observed that Gaulier's training was also valuable for screen acting, noting that the emphasis on audience awareness and the performer's pleasure translated directly to film performance: "The screen acting that I find most intolerable is people who are really keen to show you what a good actor they are... I think people assume you have to go to a real psychological actor training. And I don't think it's necessarily the case."

== Alumni ==
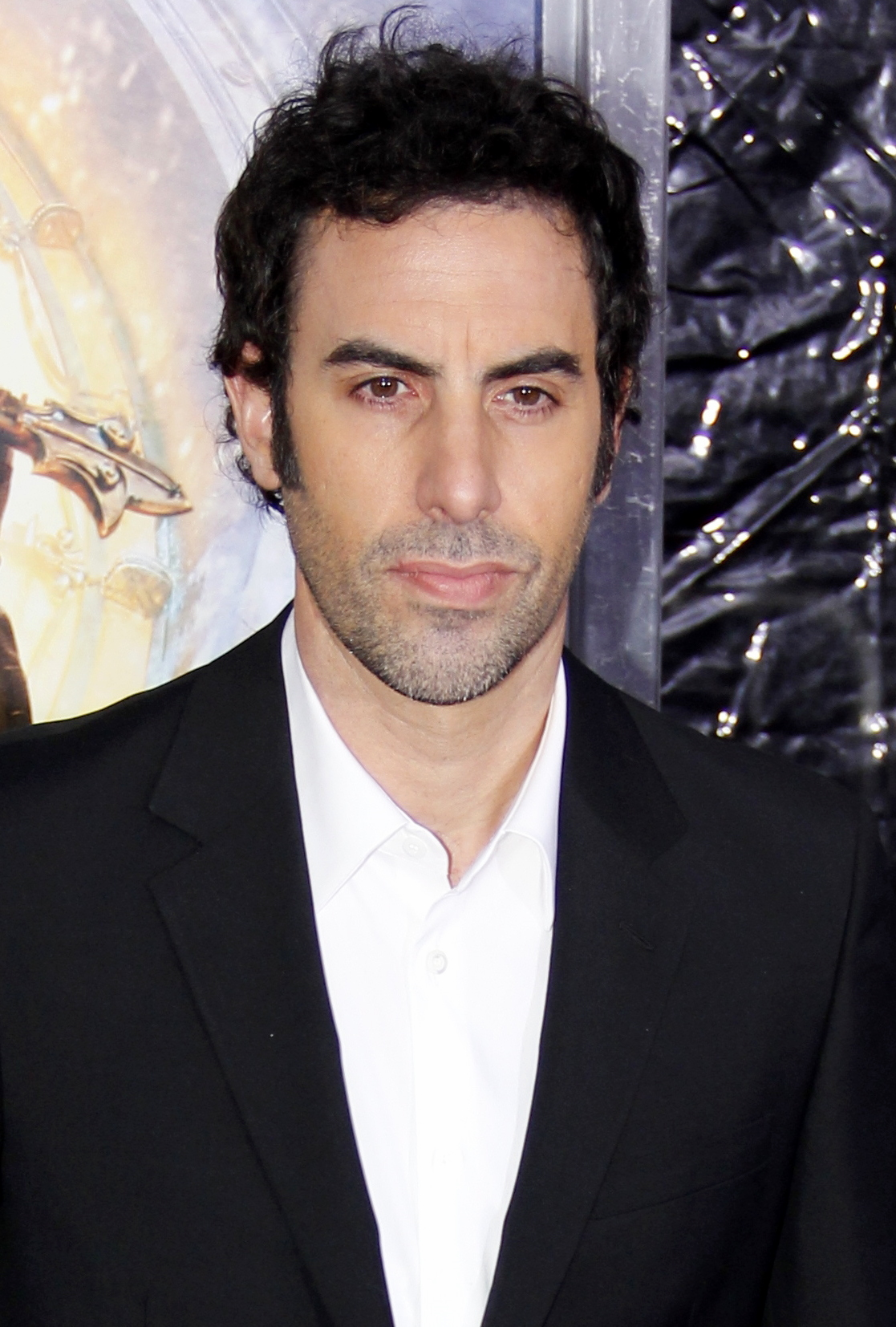
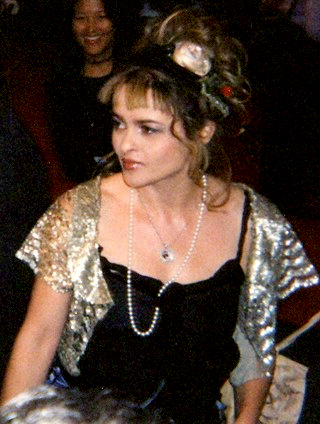
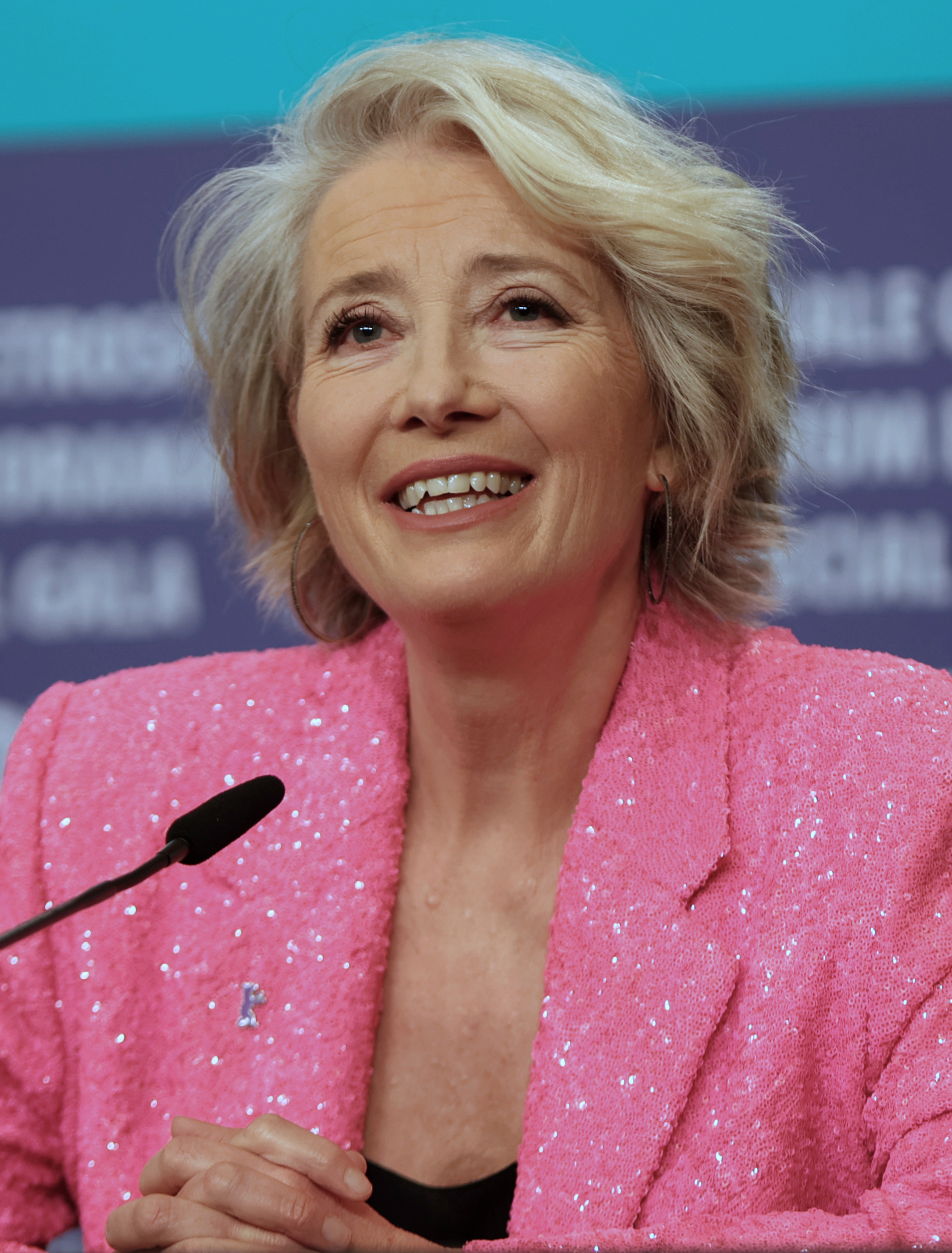
Sacha Baron Cohen (left), Helena Bonham Carter (middle) and Emma Thompson (right) are some of the most notable alumni of École Philippe Gaulier

École Philippe Gaulier has educated numerous notable alumni.

Graduates have gone on to receive multiple Academy Awards, Emmy Awards, Tony Awards, BAFTA Awards, Golden Globe Awards, SAG Awards, European Film Awards, César Awards, Olivier Awards, David di Donatello Awards, AACTA Awards, Lumière Awards, Goya Awards, Hong Kong Film Awards, Golden Horse Awards, Magritte Awards, Nastro d'Argento Awards, Molière Awards, Evening Standard Awards, Drama Desk Awards, Obie Awards, Edinburgh Comedy Awards, and the Europe Theatre Prize. As well as top prizes at the Cannes Film Festival, Venice Film Festival, and the Berlinale.

=== Selected alumni ===
- Khalid Abdalla, actor
- Dominique Abel, film director
- Annabel Arden, theatre and opera director and Complicité co-founder
- Mathew Baynton, actor
- René Bazinet, clown, mime and actor
- Roberto Benigni, actor, comedian, screenwriter and director
- Orla Brady, actor
- Louise Brealey, actor
- Phil Burgers, comedian
- Helena Bonham Carter, actor
- Hayley Carmichael, actor and Told by an Idiot co-founder
- Sacha Baron Cohen, comedian
- Eric Davis (Red Bastard), clown
- Simon Dormandy, theatre director
- Alexis Dubus, comedian
- Mark Feuerstein, actor
- Sean Foley, director, comedian and half of troupe The Right Size
- Kura Forrester, comedian and actress
- Astrid M. Fünderich, actress
- Julia Garner, actress
- Josh Glanc, comedian
- Fiona Gordon, film director and Complicité co-founder
- Stefan Haves, theatre director, clown
- Kathryn Hunter, actor
- Mark Ivanir, actor and Gesher Theatre co-founder
- Karena Lam, actress
- Elf Lyons, comedian
- Marcello Magni, Complicité co-founder
- Julia Masli, clown
- Simon McBurney, actor, writer, director and Complicité co-founder
- Hamish McColl, comedian, actor and half of troupe The Right Size
- Cal McCrystal, director and actor
- Miriama McDowell, actress, theatre director
- Siobhan McSweeney, actress
- Yolande Moreau, actress and filmmaker
- Simon Munnery, comedian
- Nina Nawalowalo, theatre director
- Eryn Jean Norvill, actor
- Alisa Palmer, director of National Theatre School of Canada
- Sally Phillips, actor, comedian, television presenter
- Carmen Pieraccini, actor and clown
- John-Luke Roberts, stand-up comedian, writer, actor
- Luke Rollason, actor and physical comedian
- Geoffrey Rush, actor -- studied with Gaulier at École Jacques Lecoq
- Teresa Saponangelo, actress
- Shubham Saraf, actor
- Simon Scardifield, actor and playwright
- David Schwimmer, actor
- Samantha Scott, director
- Nathalie Seseña, actress
- Lorna Rose Treen, comedian
- Viggo Venn, comedian
- Emma Vilarasau, actress
- Tom Walker, comedian
- Rachel Weisz, actor
- Erica Whyman, deputy artistic director at the Royal Shakespeare Company
- Anthony Wong, actor
- Emily Woof, actress and author
- Olivia Yan, theatre director, actor, and playwright
- Zach Zucker, comedian

== Personal life and death ==
Gaulier was married to Michiko Miyazaki, a former student and colleague.

Alain Gheerbrant, Françoise Marthouret, and Sacha Baron Cohen penned prefaces to Gaulier's books.

Gaulier died on 9 February 2026, at the age of 82, due to complications from a lung infection.

On 18 February 2026, Gaulier's funeral was held at Père Lachaise Cemetery in Paris. The Observer reported the "unconventional wake" had students in attendance "leaving flowers, red noses, and even a banana on his coffin."

At Gaulier's wake, The Man Who Waits for Freedom, a documentary film made in collaboration with Gaulier and Michiko Miyazaki Gaulier prior to his death, was screened for the first time. The title had been chosen by Gaulier himself. The film includes classroom footage, interviews with former students, and Gaulier's reflections on life and teaching. Subsequently, the school published the film online, describing it as "his last present". In the film, Gaulier offered a final message to his students: "Don't follow the teacher too much. Listen to the teacher... yes, but your passion, your life, your fun, your humour – it's your secret. So follow this secret."

== In popular culture ==
Zach Galifianakis has stated that Gaulier and his school inspired his TV show Baskets.

Hillary Clinton and Chelsea Clinton interviewed Gaulier for the first episode of their Apple TV+ series, Gutsy. In the episode, Hillary Clinton also participated in a clown class. Videos of Clinton interviewing Gaulier went viral on social media.

In 2026, Sacha Baron Cohen claimed he based his portrayal of 'Jean Girard' in Talladega Nights on Gaulier.

== See also ==
- Ringling Bros. and Barnum & Bailey Clown College
