= Natalie Palamides =

American actress

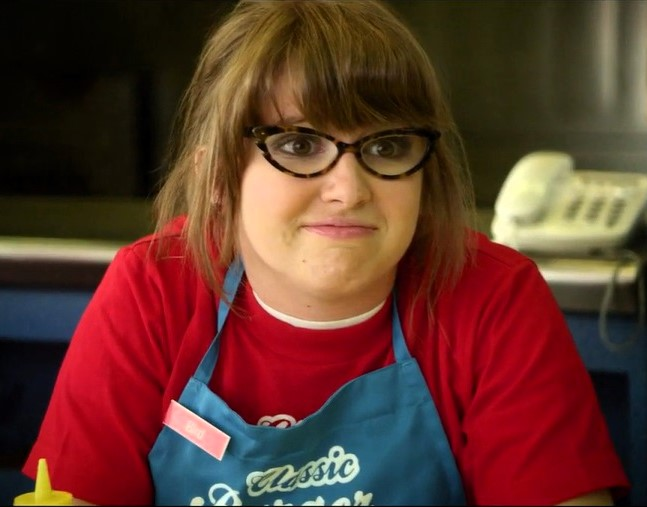
- Palamides in 2014 short film Pike and Bird
- Occupations: Actress; voice actress; comedian; television writer
- Years active: 2010–present

Natalie Palamides is an American actress, comedian and television writer.

== Career ==
Aspiring to work at Saturday Night Live, Palamides moved to Los Angeles and joined the Upright Citizens Brigade after college. She began voice-over and commercial work. She also took classes on clown performance at the Idiot Workshop and the Lyric Hyperion. Early sketches featured Palamides' characters: fantasizing about eating salad from a man's pants; complaining to the manager of sandwich shop Eggslut as an anthropomorphic egg; insisting on being objectified. Through her classes, variety shows and open mic shows, she began developing longer-form performance from improvisations in unusual outfits.

Palamides took the egg costume from her sketch and used it to make her first hour-long show, Laid.

Palamides developed the exaggeratedly masculine character Nate, from her work with the Pig Iron Theatre Company, into an hour-long performance, Nate – A One Man Show. Members of the audience participate, such as by wrestling Nate, with audience consent and sexual consent as themes. After winning the Total Theatre Award at the 2018 Edinburgh Fringe Festival, it was commissioned by Amy Poehler's production company Paper Kite and released on Netflix on December 1, 2020. Critics widely acclaimed Nate for its provocative performance, regarding it as an innovative break with "Netflix's mainstream comedy brand."

Palamides starred as Buttercup in the 2016 reboot of The Powerpuff Girls.

She won Best Newcomer at the Edinburgh Comedy Awards in 2017.

Palamides plays the character "Mara" in TV commercials for Progressive Insurance.

She also co-hosts the Disney-themed podcast Hidden Mickeys alongside Carrie Poppy.

In 2022, Palamides interviewed clown teacher Philippe Gaulier alongside Hillary Clinton and Chelsea Clinton for their Apple TV+ series Gutsy. This has led to the misunderstanding that she trained with him, something she has corrected several times on social media.

Palamides played a horror movie–style clown, Funzo, in Apocalypse Clown (2023). The low-budget comedy film won Best Irish Film at the Galway Film Fleadh. Though reviews had mixed opinions towards the humour and writing, Funzo was acclaimed. Simon Henderson of Blazing Minds lauded that Palamides "ranges from seeming innocence to apparent insanity, sometimes in the same scene". Digital Spy's Ian Sandwell praised her "deranged and hilarious" performance, particularly for minor comedic details such as a scene in which her character removes her clown nose.

In August 2024, Palamides performed WEER at the Edinburgh Festival Fringe. The show, which has been described as a "one-woman romcom", received widespread acclaim. WEER came to New York City in 2025.

"Broadcast", a series Palamides worked on with fellow clown Courtney Pauroso, is yet to be released.

== Filmography ==
Film
| Year | Title | Role | Notes |
|---|---|---|---|
| 2012 | Supply Side Jesus | Rachel | |
| 2012 | The Real St. Nick | Mallory | |
| 2013 | There Will Be Crumbs | Tiffany | |
| 2014 | My Name Is Vivienne | Caitlin | |
| 2014 | Minor Alterations | Sara Joel | |
| 2014 | If D.A.R.E. Made a Horror Film | Narrator | |
| 2015 | Six Things Only Dog Lovers Will Understand | Writer | |
| 2015 | The Real Witches of Salem County | Gertrude | |
| 2015 | Freaks of Nature | Kathy Murch | |
| 2016 | The Worst Sex Surprise | Sarah | |
| 2022 | Jackass Forever | Herself | Guest appearance |
| 2022 | Jackass 4.5 | Herself | Guest appearance |
| 2023 | Apocalypse Clown | Funzo | |
| 2023 | Merry Little Batman | Francine (voice) | Direct-to-streaming film |
| 2025 | In Jeff We Trust | Lungs Mercury | |

Television
| Year | Title | Role | Notes |
|---|---|---|---|
| 2012 | ThunderCats | Kathleen (voice) | Episode: "The Forever Bag" |
| 2013–2015 | Burning Bridges | Janice | Recurring role |
| 2014 | Therapy | Annie | Episode: "Episode 1" |
| 2014 | The Tinsel Zone | Judy | Episode: "Pitches in Stitches" |
| 2014 | Tattoo Nightmares | Sara | Episode: "Murder Boner" |
| 2015 | The Great Indoors | Natalie | Episode: "Pilot" |
| 2015 | Pitiful Creatures | Student #2 | Episode: "College Professor Blows Minds" |
| 2015 | Stardumb | Basil | Recurring role |
| 2015 | The Brat Cave | Sluts the Cat/Bikini | Recurring role |
| 2016 | Last Moments of Relationships | Mona | Episode: "Nicest Breakup Ever" |
| 2016 | The Real Housewives of Shakespeare | Ophelia | Recurring role |
| 2016 | Very Important House | Frolie (voice) | Pilot |
| 2016 | Uncle Grandpa | Buttercup (voice) | Episode: "Pizza Eve" |
| 2016 | Uncle Buck | Amy | Episode: "Pilot" |
| 2016 | I Ship It | Interviewee #1 | Episode: "Let's Start a Band" |
| 2016 | Teen Titans Go! | Buttercup (voice) | Episode: "TTG v PPG" |
| 2016 | Future-Worm! | Aunt Bitsy (voice) | Episode: "Deunited/Great Debates with the End of Time/The Forever Five" |
| 2016 | Tween Fest | Juicetine | Recurring role |
| 2016–2017 | The UCB Show | Various | 5 episodes |
| 2016–2019 | The Powerpuff Girls | Buttercup, additional voices | Main role |
| 2017–2019 | Star vs. the Forces of Evil | Foolduke, Kitten Barrel, additional voices | Recurring role |
| 2018 | Please Understand Me | Natalie | Episode: "Rory & Natalie" |
| 2018 | Ghost Story Club | Natalie | Episode: "Natalie" |
| 2018 | OK K.O.! Let's Be Heroes | Winnie (voice) | Episode: "Monster Party" |
| 2018–2020 | Rapunzel's Tangled Adventure | Calliope (voice) | 2 episodes |
| 2018–2022 | Bob's Burgers | Kayla / Willow / Gas station woman / Nippin' Nevin mom / Drew Paige (voice) | 4 episodes |
| 2019 | Corporate | Kylie | Episode: "The Fall" |
| 2019 | Momma Named Me Sheriff | Teresa / Little Girl (voice) | Episode: "Bald Boyz" |
| 2020 | Duncanville | Bradley / Claire / Lil Joey / additional voices | 8 episodes |
| 2020 | Central Park | Female Jogger (voice) | Episode: "A Fish Called Snakehead" |
| 2020 | Wild Life | Viv (voice) | Main role |
| 2020 | Aunty Donna's Big Ol' House of Fun | | Episode: "Night-Time!" |
| 2020 | Nate – A One Man Show | Nate | TV special |
| 2020–2022 | The Owl House | Teen Eda (voice) | 4 episodes |
| 2023 | Family Guy | Old Woman (voice) | Episode: "Old World Harm" |
| 2023–2025 | Tiny Toons Looniversity | Shirley the Loon, Furball (voice) | Main role |
| 2025 | Amy's Dead-End Dreamhouse | Keri the Mail Carrier | 5 episodes |
| 2025–present | Haunted Hotel | Esther (voice) | Main role |
