= Kathryn Hunter =

British actress (born 1957)

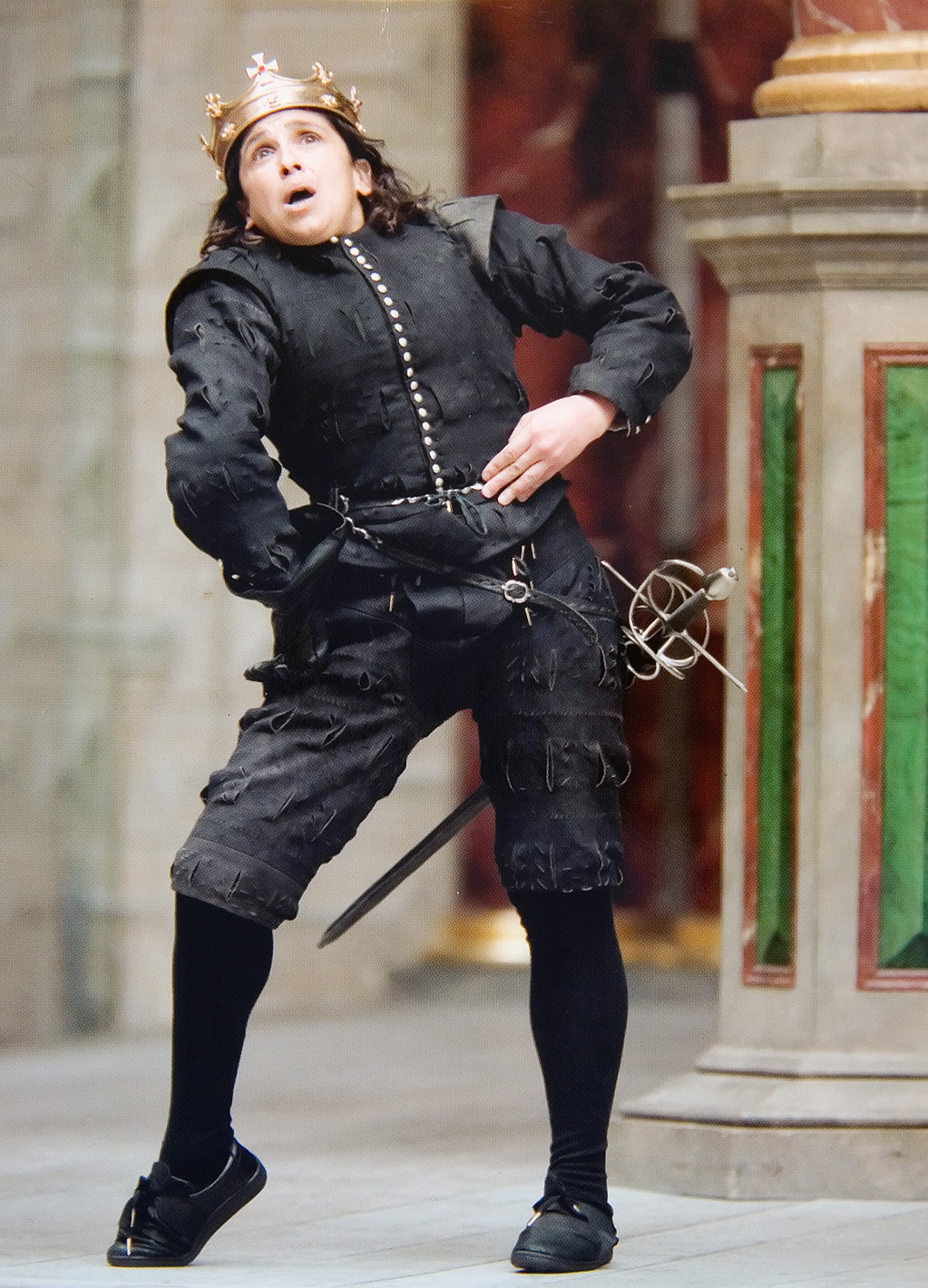
- Hunter as Richard III at the Globe, 2003
- Born: Aikaterini Hadjipateras; 9 April 1957 (age 69); New York City, U.S.
- Citizenship: United Kingdom; United States
- Education: Royal Academy of Dramatic Art; École Philippe Gaulier
- Occupations: Actress; director
- Years active: 1986–present
- Spouse: Marcello Magni (m. 2011; died 2022)

Aikaterini Hadjipateras (Greek: Αικατερίνη Χατζηπατέρα; born 9 April 1957), known professionally as Kathryn Hunter, is an American-born British actress and theatre director known for her work in physical theatre. Hunter has appeared as Arabella Figg in the Harry Potter film series, as Eedy Karn in the Disney+ Star Wars series Andor, and as the Three Witches in Joel Coen's The Tragedy of Macbeth. Hunter's accolades include the Olivier Award for Best Actress and the New York Film Critics Circle Award for Best Supporting Actress.

== Early life and education ==
Hunter was born as Aikaterini Hadjipateras on 9 April 1957 in New York, United States, to Greek parents. She was raised in England. She has a twin sister and two brothers.

Hunter trained at the Royal Academy of Dramatic Art (RADA), where she later became an associate and directed student productions; she also studied clowning with Philippe Gaulier at École Philippe Gaulier in France.

During Hunter's time at RADA, she was seriously and permanently injured in an incident referred to for most of her career as a "car accident"; she broke her back, pelvis and one arm, smashed an elbow, crushed a foot and suffered a collapsed lung. Hunter was told she would never walk again and was left with a crooked back, a bent elbow, and a permanent limp. Years later, Hunter stated in an interview that her injuries occurred when she attempted suicide by jumping out of a window.

== Career ==
=== Stage ===
In her stage work, Hunter is particularly associated with physical theatre, having been described as a "virtuoso physical performer."

Hunter has worked with renowned companies, including Shared Experience and Complicité. She won an Olivier Award in 1991 for playing the millionairess in Friedrich Dürrenmatt's The Visit.

Critics have noted Hunter's unusual physical presence and her range. Charles Spencer of The Telegraph wrote, "diminutive in stature, and slightly lame, she has a deep, guttural voice, eyes like black olives and the most expressive of faces. Almost nothing seems beyond her range, from farcical clowning to deepest, darkest tragedy."

Hunter's "uncommon ability to shape-shift" has led her to play roles typically reserved for male actors. She was the first British woman to play King Lear professionally. Hunter's portrayal of Lear conscientiously challenged the audience to separate character and performer: her voice and clothing read as male, but she physicalised lines such as "Down from the waist they are Centaurs/Though women all above" to remind the audience of the female body playing the part. She also played a male role in The Bee, directed by Hideki Noda, which played at the Soho Theatre in June 2006 and 2012.

Hunter has also played animals and other creatures. In Kafka's Monkey, a solo piece based on Franz Kafka's "A Report to an Academy," she played a monkey delivering a speech to a scientific society about its transformation from a monkey to a man. The piece was a highly acclaimed sell-out success at the Young Vic in 2009, where it was reprised in May 2011. It toured to the Baryshnikov Arts Center in New York in April 2013. According to Charles Isherwood of The New York Times, Hunter's performance had "wry wisdom, a touch of cheeky humor and, above all, a sense of dignity."

In November 2013, Hunter co-starred as the fairy Puck in Julie Taymor's production of A Midsummer Night's Dream, the show that opened the Theatre for a New Audience in Brooklyn. Ben Brantley of The New York Times described Hunter's Puck as "genuinely original" and "part music-hall comedian, part fairground contortionist."

In 2008, Hunter co-starred in Fragments, a collection of short plays by Samuel Beckett that was directed by Peter Brook. Of the London run at the Young Vic, Andrew Dickson of The Guardian wrote, "the evening belongs to Kathryn Hunter, who crams into a few minutes of stage time more than most actors achieve in a career." The piece toured internationally, appearing in New York in 2011.

Hunter was made an Artistic Associate at the Royal Shakespeare Company (RSC) in 2008.

From January to March 2009, Hunter debuted as an RSC director with a production of Othello at the Warwick Arts Centre, Hackney Empire, Northern Stage, Oxford Playhouse and Liverpool Playhouse. Her husband, Marcello Magni, was movement director on the production and appeared in it as Roderigo. Other cast members included Michael Gould as Iago, Patrice Naiambana as Othello, and Natalia Tena as Desdemona.

In 2010, Hunter played Cleopatra in a production of Antony and Cleopatra and the Fool in a production of King Lear at the RSC's Courtyard Theatre in Stratford-upon-Avon. The latter performance was described as "outstanding". In January 2011, she withdrew from these roles shortly before the plays were due to be revived.

In February 2016, Hunter took the title role of Cyrano de Bergerac at the Southwark Playhouse, London. Guardian critic Michael Billington wrote, "Hunter is an astonishing shape-shifting performer who can play just about anything" but Telegraph critic Jane Schilling called Russell Bolam's production "an opportunity squandered." In 2017, she starred in the title role in The House of Bernarda Alba at the Royal Exchange in Manchester.

In 2018, Hunter returned to the RSC to play the title role in Timon of Athens, directed by Simon Godwin.

From December 2022 to June 2023, Hunter played the lead role of Janina Duszejko in a stage adaptation of the Polish mystery novel Drive Your Plow Over the Bones of the Dead, adapted for the stage by Complicité.

=== Film and television ===
Hunter's screen work includes a supporting role in the TV series Rome as Cleopatra's companion, Charmian, and voicing Gorn in Tron: Uprising. In a 2001 Silent Witness story titled "Faith" (BBC), Hunter played the role of Sister Geraldine Catterson. In 2018, she starred in the BBC Two drama Black Earth Rising as Capi Petridis, the Prosecutor of the International Criminal Court.

Beginning in 2022, Hunter portrayed Eedy Karn in the television series Andor.

Notable film work includes Mike Leigh's All or Nothing (2002) and Harry Potter's neighbour, Arabella Figg, in the fifth film of the Harry Potter series, Harry Potter and the Order of the Phoenix (2007). In 2021, she earned acclaim in her portrayal of the Three Witches in Joel Coen's The Tragedy of Macbeth; for her performance, she was awarded the New York Film Critics Circle Award for Best Supporting Actress.

== Personal life ==
Hunter married actor Marcello Magni, the co-founder of Complicité, in 2011. The couple remained married until Magni's death in 2022.

== Filmography ==
Key
†	Denotes films that have not yet been released

=== Film ===
Year	Title	Role	Notes
1992	Orlando	Countess	
1993	The Baby of Mâcon	The Second Midwife	
1999	Simon Magus	Grandmother	
2002	All or Nothing	Cécile	
2007	Harry Potter and the Order of the Phoenix	Mrs. Arabella Figg	
2014	A Midsummer Night's Dream	Puck	
2015	Tale of Tales	Witch	
2021	The Tragedy of Macbeth	The Witches / Old Man	New York Film Critics Circle Award for Best Supporting Actress
2022	Inland	Eliza 'Lizzie' Heron	
2023	The Pod Generation	Post Office Clerk	
2023	Poor Things	Swiney	
2024	Megalopolis	Teresa Cicero	
2024	The Front Room	Solange	
2025	Vicious	The Woman	
2025	Hedda	Bertie	
2026	Ladies First	Glenda Cartwright	
2026	Ray Gunn	Vanzine Kaluta (voice)	

=== Television ===
Year	Title	Role	Notes
1992	Screen Two	Margarita Guzman	1 episode: "Maria's Child"
1994	Grushko	Dr. Sopova	2 episodes
2001	Silent Witness	Geraldine Catterson	2 episodes: "Faith: Parts 1 and 2"
2001	NCS: Manhunt	Doctor Anna Kyriakou	Pilot episode
2005–2007	Rome	Charmian	4 episodes
2012–2013	Tron: Uprising	Gorn (voice)	2 episodes: "The Reward" and "Rendezvous"
2018	Flowers	Wendy	3 episodes
2018	Black Earth Rising	Capi Petridis	2 episodes
2019	Les Misérables	Madame Victurnien	Miniseries, 1 episode
2020	Unprecedented	Katya	1 episode
2021	Landscapers	Tabitha Edwards	Miniseries, 3 episodes
2022–2025	Andor	Eedy Karn	Recurring role; 9 episodes
2024	Grotesquerie	Maisie Montgomery	4 episodes
2024–present	Black Doves	Lenny Lines	Recurring role; 5 episodes
2026	Ann Droid	Eileen	Recurring role; 5 episodes
2026	Only Murders in the Building		Season 6
2027	A Knight of the Seven Kingdoms	Lady Vaith	Season 2
