= List of Total Theatre Award winners =

Total Theatre Awards were first presented in 1997 and are given annually at the Edinburgh Festival Fringe to companies excelling in devised theatre, live art, visual performance, mime, puppetry, physical theatre, experimental theatre, dance, clown, circus, street, immersive, outdoor, site specific performance. They are one of a number of awards open to companies/artists presenting work at the festival.

== 1997 ==
Sources:

- Award for Most Innovative Overall Production: The Right Size – Do You Come Here Often?
- Audience's Choice Award: Acrobat – Acrobat
- Award for Most Innovative International Production: DEREVO – Red Zone
- Award for Best Use of Design: Co Yvette Bozsik – Hommage à Mary Wigman
- Award for Most Innovative Touring Production: Fecund Theatre – 27
- Award for Best Newcomer: K486 – The Trial
- Lifetime Achievement Award: Steven Berkoff

== 1999 ==
Sources:

- Award for Best Overall Production: Anonymous Society – Jacques Brel
- Award for Best Newcomer: Metro-Boulet-Dodo – Reunion
- Award for Best British Production: Ridiculusmus – The Exhibitionists and Yes Yes Yes
- Award for Best International Production: Theatre Talipot – The Water Carriers and Passage
- Audience's Choice Award: No Ordinary Angels – Deadly
- Award for Best Use of Design: the Young Vic Theatre Co – The Arabian Nights
- Award for Most Supportive Venue: Continental Shifts at St Brides
- Lifetime Achievement Award: Ken Campbell and Nola Rae

== 2000 ==
- Ariel Teatr: A Little Requiem for Kantor
- BlackSKYwhite: Bertrand's Toys
- Generally Better Productions (latterly known as Theatre O): 3 Dark Tales
- Shunt: The Balled of Bobby Francois
- Spymonkey: Stiff - Undertaking Undertaking
- Audience's Choice Award: Pig Iron Theatre Company – Poet in New York
- Award for Most Supportive Venue: The Pleasance
- Lifetime Achievement Award: Monika Pagneux

== 2002 ==
Sources:

- Compagnie Fiat Lux: Nouvelles Folies
- Company F/Z: Throat
- Nats Nus: Ful
- Shona Reppe Puppets: Cinderella
- Theatrum Botanicum – Go Go: The Boy with Magic Feet
- Wishbone: Scapegoat
- Award for Most Supportive Venue: Aurora Nova
- Award for Outstanding Excellence and Innovation: DEREVO

== 2003 ==
Sources:

- Akhe: White Cabin
- Fabrik Company: Pandora 88
- Deja Donne: There Where We Were
- Eddie Ladd: Club Luz
- Duckie: C'est Vauxhall
- Blow-Up Theatre: The Illusion Brothers
- Materiali Resistenti Dance Factory: Waterwall
- Award for Most Supportive Venue: Aurora St Stephens

== 2005 ==
Sources:

- Andrew Dawson: Absence and Presence
- Gecko Theatre: The Race
- Grid Iron Theatre: The Devil's Larder
- Kazuko Hohki: Evidence for the Existence of Borrowers
- Dreamthinkspeak: Don't Look Back
- Station House Opera: Roadmetal Sweetbread

== 2006 ==
Sources:

- Inspector Sands and Stamping Ground Theatre: Hysteria
- NIE (New International Encounter): Past Half Remembered
- Hoipolloi: Floating
- Farm in the Cave: Sclavi / Song of an Emigrant
- Award for Best Newcomer: Chotto Ookii Theatre Company – And Even My Goldfish
- Award for Innovation: Will Adamsdale / Chris Branch – The Receipt
- Award for Significant Contribution to Physical and Visual Theatre / Performance: Battersea Arts Centre

== 2007 ==
- Award for Best Emerging Company: 1927 – Between the Devil and the Deep Blue Sea
- Award for Best Original Work by a Collective / Ensemble: Rude Mechs in association with Erich Jungwirth and Richard Jordan Productions – Get Your War On
- Award for Best Physical Performance: Sedari Movement Laboratory in association with AsiaNow Productions – Woyzeck
- Award for Experimentation: Ontroerend Goed – The Smile Off Your Face
- Award for Best Small Scale Work: News From Nowhere (Tim Crouch) and the Fruitmarket Gallery – England
- Award for Significant Contribution: Jos Houben
- Inaugural Wildcard Award: Precarious – Druthers

== 2008 ==
Sources:

- Award for Experiment and Innovation: Ontroerend Goed, Kopergiettery & Richard Jordon Productions – Once and For All We're Gonna Tell You Who We Are So Shut Up and Listen
- Award for Graduate Company: Little Bulb Theatre – Crocosmia
- Award for Story Theatre: Puppet State Theatre Company – The Man Who Planted Trees
- Award for Visual Theatre: RedCape Theatre – The Idiot Colony
- Award for Young Company: THE TEAM & National Theatre of Scotland Workshop – Architecting
- Award for Significant Contribution to Physical and Visual Theatre: Footsbarn Touring Theatre

== 2009 ==
Sources:

- Award for Emerging Artist / Company: The River People – Lilly Through the Dark
- Award for Devised Performance: Beady Eye / Kristin Fredricksson – Everything Must Go (Or the Voluntary Attempt to Overcome Unnecessary Obstacles)
- Award for Innovation / Interaction / Immersion: Adrian Howells – Foot-Washing for the Sole
- Award for Physical and Visual Theatre: Clod Ensemble – Under Glass
- Award for Music and Theatre: Dafydd James and Ben Lewis – My Name is Sue
- Award for Significant Contribution to Theatre Making: Improbable Theatre

== 2010 ==
Sources:

- Award for Emerging Artist / Company: Bryony Kimmings – Sex Idiot
- Award for Physical and Visual Theatre:
  - Catherine Wheels – White
  - NoFit State Circus – Tabu
- Award for Innovation:
  - Cora Bissett, Ankur Productions / Pachamama Productions – Roadkill
  - News From Nowhere / Tim Crouch – The Author
  - Bootworks Theatre – 30 Days to Space
- Award for Significant Contribution to the Field of Total Theatre: David Bates

== 2011 ==
Sources:

- Award for Emerging Artist / Company: ShadyJane – Sailing On
- Award for Physical / Visual / Devised Performance:
  - Bunk Puppets and Scamp Theatre – Swamp Juice
  - NeTTheatre / Grupa Coincidentia – Turandot
- Award for Innovation:
  - Look Left Look Right – You Once Said Yes
  - Adrian Howells – May I Have the Pleasure...?
  - Tania El Khoury – Maybe if you choreograph me, you will feel better
- Award for Significant Contribution to the Field of Total Theatre: Judith Knight (Artsadmin)

== 2012 ==
Sources:

- Award for Emerging Artist / Company: Charlotte De Bruyne & Nathalie Marie Verbeke, supported by Ontroerend Goed & Richard Jordan – XXXO
- Award for Physical / Visual / Devised Performance:
  - Teatr Zar – Caesarean Section: Essays on Suicide
  - Res de Res – (remor)
- Award for Innovation, Experimentation & Playing with Form:
  - Ontroerend Goed, Laika, Richard Jordan Productions – All That is Wrong
  - Rob Drummond – Bullet Catch
  - Soho Theatre and The Mason Sisters – Doctor Brown: Befrdfgth
- Award for Significant Contribution to the Field of Total Theatre: Helen Lannaghan and Joseph Seelig, (London International Mime Festival)

== 2013 ==
Sources:

- Award for Emerging Artist / Company: Sh!t Theatre – JSA (Job Seekers Anonymous) 2013
- Award for Physical / Visual / Devised Performance:
  - Company Non Nova – L'Après-midi d'un Foehn (Version 1)
  - Pirates of the Carabina – Flown
- Award for Innovation, Experimentation & Playing with Form:
  - Berlin, Big in Belgium, Richard Jordan Productions – Bonanza
  - Brokentalkers – Have I No Mouth
  - Scottee – The Worst of Scottee
- Award for Significant Contribution to the Field of Total Theatre: C!rca

== 2014 ==
Sources:

- Emerging Artist / Company Award: Touretteshero – Backstage in Biscuit Land
- Physical / Visual / Devised Performance Award: Geoff Sobelle – The Object Lesson
- Innovation, Experimentation & Playing with Form Award:
  - Dead Centre – Lippy
  - Two Destination Language – Near Gone
- Circus Award: Underbelly Productions in association with Barely Methodical Troupe – Bromance:
- Judges Discretionary Awards:
  - Wunderbaum, Red Cat, Big in Belgium, Richard Jordan Productions – Looking for Paul
  - Kim Noble, Soho Theatre and David Johnson & John Mackay in association with ibt – You’re Not Alone
- Significant Contribution to the Field of Total Theatre Award: Ridiculusmus

== 2015 ==
Sources:

- Emerging Artist / Company Award: Breach – The Beanfield
- Physical / Visual / Devised Performance Award: Al Seed – Oog
- Innovation, Experimentation & Playing with Form Award:
  - Sue MacLaine and Nadia Nadarajah – Can I Start Again Please
  - Volker Gerling – Portraits in Motion
- Dance Award: Le Patin Libre – Vertical Influences
- Circus Award: The Palestinian Circus – B-Orders
- Significant Contribution to the Field of Total Theatre Award: Forced Entertainment

== 2016 ==
Sources:

- Emerging Artist / Company Award:
  - FK Alexander with Okishima Island Tourist Group Association – (I Could Go on Singing) Over the Rainbow
  - Yinka Kuitenbrouwer, Big in Belgium, Richard Jordan Productions, Theatre Royal Plymouth – One Hundred Homes
- Physical / Visual / Devised Performance Award:
  - Atelier Bildraum, Big in Belgium, Richard Jordan Productions, Theatre Royal Plymouth – Bildraum
  - Nic Green with Rosana Cade and Laura Bradshaw – Cock and Bull
- Innovation, Experimentation & Playing with Form Award: Hot Brown Honey with Briefs Factory – Hot Brown Honey
- Dance Award: Mauro Paccagnella and Alessandro Bernardesch – Happy Hour
- Circus Award: Ockham’s Razor and Turtle Key Arts – Ockham's Razor: Tipping Point
- Significant Contribution to the Field of Total Theatre Award: Forest Fringe

== 2017 ==
Sources:

- Emerging Artist / Company Award: YesYesNoNo – Five Encounters on a Site Called Craigslist
- Physical / Visual / Devised Performance Award: Gandini Juggling – Sigma
- Circus Award: Fauna – Fauna
- Innovation, Experimentation & Playing with Form Award:
  - Selina Thompson Ltd – Salt
  - Rachel Mars – Our Carnal Hearts
  - Bertrand Lesca & Nasi Voutsas – Palmyra
- Dance Award: Oona Doherty – Hope Hunt and the Ascension into Lazarus
- Judges Discretionary Award: Liz Aggiss – Slap and Tickle
- Significant Contribution to the Field of Total Theatre Award: Lyn Gardner

== 2018 ==
Sources:

- Emerging Artist / Company Award: Samira Elagoz in association with From Start to Finnish – Cock, Cock… Who’s There?
- Physical / Visual / Devised Performance Award:
  - Lobke Leirens and Maxim Storms – Another One
  - Chaliwaté Company and Focus Company – Backup
- Circus Award: Sharon Burgess Productions & A Good Catch – Casting Off
- Innovation, Experimentation & Playing with Form Award:
  - One Inch Badge – Pussy Riot: Riot Days
  - Natalie Palamides – Nate
- Dance Award: V / DA and MHz, in association with Feral – Void
- Significant Contribution to the Field of Total Theatre Award: Le Gateau Chocolat

== 2019 ==
Sources:

- Emerging Artist / Company Award: Travis Alabanza – Burgerz
- Physical / Visual / Devised Performance Award: Julia Croft and Nisha Madhan with Zanetti Productions – Working On My Night Moves
- Circus Award:
  - Nikki & JD – Knot
  - Circumference – Staged
- Innovation, Experimentation & Playing with Form Award:
  - Battersea Arts Centre and BAC Beatbox Academy – Frankenstein: How to Make a Monster
  - In Bed with My Brother – Tricky Second Album
- Dance Award: Chiara Bersani – Seeking Unicorns
- Judges Discretionary Awards:
  - Bertrand Lesca and Nasi Voutsas – The End
  - Scottee & Friends – Fat Blokes
  - Amy Bell – The Forecast
- Significant Contribution to the Field of Total Theatre Award: Jessica Brough (Fringe of Colour)
