= Ra-Ra Zoo =

Ra-Ra Zoo was an English-based contemporary circus theatre company, active (August 1984 - September 1994), a seminal group who created self devised physical theatre performance for theatres using comedy and circus skills. Founded by Sue Broadway, Stephen Kent, David Spathaky and Sue Bradley while they were all working and staying together at the Edinburgh Festival Fringe in August 1984.

In 2018, the UK Guardian newspaper named them as one of the 25 most influential aspects of the 250 year history of circus in the West.

The first public performance was at the infamous Tunnel Club hosted by Malcolm Hardee in the East End of London. Notably, the normally vocal audience were unusually silenced by a wordless version of their signature teacup act.

Their first full show at the Battersea Arts Centre was as part of the London International Mime Festival in January 1985, their first theatre show, sub-titled, "Juggling With A Social Conscience".

They subsequently toured internationally for ten years playing in theatres notable to Africa, South America, Australia and extensively in Europe. Their show under the joint Artistic Direction of David Spathaky and Sue Broadway combined the ethos of 'alternative' comedy of the 1980 with a 1970s revival of circus skills, variously called 'Neo-circus or new variety by them or contemporary circus' by other people, it largely promoted a reinvention of circus focusing on human skill and generally without presenting animal acts. Their background in street performing, The Amazing Mendezies and in the influential Circus Oz (of which Sue Broadway was a founding member) gave the show an irreverent, fast-paced, avant-garde, surrealist feel.

== Productions ==
They produced several different shows and were occasionally given some financial support in the UK by the Arts Council and other grants. They also produced several large scale community shows, were touring two shows at the same time in the early 1990s and created jobs for more than twenty five people simultaneously during production periods.

They notably adhered to a political commitment of a balance of men and women on stage and off and of equal pay for all company members throughout their existence.

Shows included:

- Juggling With A Social Conscience.
- My Life on a Plate of Toast — Several versions - chamber circus 4 people on stage
- Domestic Bliss - a touring seven person theatre circus show dir. Joe Page. 1987
- Stop Laughing This Is Serious - touring 7-person theatre circus show dir. Ben Keaton, choreographer Yolanda Snaith 1989
- Fabulous Beasts - touring seven-person theatre circus show dir. Roy Hutchins 1991
- Gravity Swing- touring seven-person theatre circus show dir. Sue Broadway 1992
- Angels and Amazons - all-woman 3-person clown show dir. Debbie Oates, 1992
- Swan - a community circus at Waterman's Arts Centre, 1991 in collaboration with Green Candle.
- White Snake - A large-scale community circus opera (50 performers) combining professional and non-professional performers, trainers from China, original libretto and commissioned music. dir. Deb Pope 1993
- Cabinet of Curiosities - A 'chamber circus' - 4 people on stage 1994
- Broadway Belles - All-women cabaret show
- The Mast - a site-specific outdoor aerial rig at the Albany Empire in Deptford and the Henley Regatta.
- The Plymouth Theatre Royal Cleaners - a commissioned intervention at a patrons' end of season party.

== Influence ==
Ra-Ra Zoo was influenced by the agitprop and political theatre of the late 1960s and early 70's and the ritual theatre and 'Happenings' associated with the time notably the 'Grand Magic Circus', 'Circus Oz', 'The People Show', 'Cunning Stunts', 'The Festival of Fools' in Amsterdam and the German choreographer Pina Bausch. Political influence came from the 1970s wave of the feminist movement and direct action politics such as the protests at Greenham Common in the UK and the resurgence of 'theatre' as political activism.

Ra-Ra Zoo influenced in turn many others as the company employed over a hundred people during its existence and played to many thousands of people worldwide. They spawned and encouraged, directly and indirectly, many offshoots including The Circus Space, (now NCCA) The Gandini Juggling Project, The Flying Gorillas, No Ordinary Angels, Le La Les, Broadway and Co., and Stretch People.

Founder Sue Broadway returned to lead Circus Oz as Artistic Director and helped direct the circus elements of the Sydney Olympics opening ceremony.

Founder Dave Spathaky was in semi retirement from 1994 but after surgery in 2008 produced and occasionally performed as The Great Davido. Dave Spathaky died in 2023. Founder Stephen Kent is a renowned musician and alongside his performing hosts a weekly radio show of world music.

Mark Digby (1963 - 2022) and Ali Houiellebecq who met while in RRZ and formed 'La le les' which toured successfully for many years.

Longtime member Lindsey Butcher, dancer, juggler and aerialist subsequently formed Gravity & Levity.

Sean Gandini and Kati Ylä-Hokkala left Ra-Ra Zoo in 1992 to form the Gandini Juggling

== Media visibility ==
Although generally politically opposed to recorded media, the company performed on television on programs for young people such as No. 73, Blue Peter, guest spots on The Late Late Show and elsewhere. They also featured on a broadcast pilot for C4 with Spike Milligan The Last Laugh before TVAM. Dave Spathaky and Sue Broadway appeared together on TV shows worldwide, several times successfully beating their own world plate spinning record.

== Early days ==
In early days they played on the emerging 'New Variety' and alternative cabaret circuit and were the very first performers on stage at the newly reopened Hackney Empire in East London on 9 December 1986. They subsequently played several successful seasons there with their full-length shows.

== World touring ==
Their extensive touring was sometimes partly funded by the British Council but also self-produced. They represented the UK at World Expos in Vancouver, Canada, in 1986 and in Brisbane, Australia, in 1988.

== Death or resurrection? ==
Ra-Ra Zoo's last full show to date 'Cabinet of Curiosities' toured in 1993/4 and like their first full show (in 1995) was in the London International Mime Festival (in 1994), the last show of that tour was at the Liverpool Everyman also in 1994.

== Reprise ==
In 2011 founders Dave Spathaky, Sue Broadway (with musician Thom Podgoretsky) performed at the Cork Midsummer Festival and the Glastonbury Festival but have currently no plans for new Ra-Ra Zoo productions in the pipelines but an online project in 2020 called 'Clown Power Live' at: http://zoological.ie, during the anthropause, contain collaborative elements between Sue Broadway & Dave Spathaky.
