= Fourth Monkey Actor Training Company =

Theatre company and drama school in London

Fourth Monkey
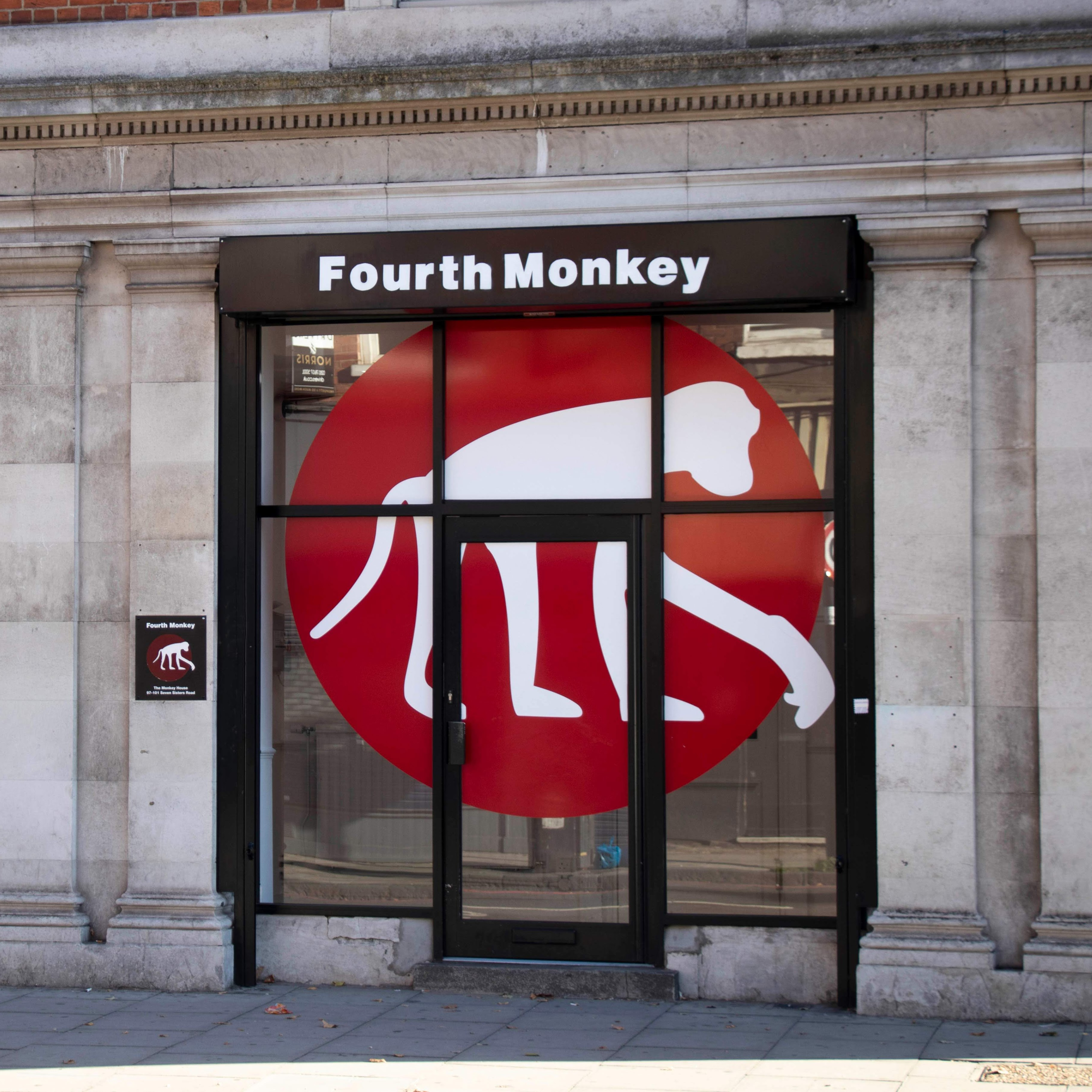
- Established: 2010
- Founders: Charleen Qwaye, Steven Green
- Academic affiliations: Awarding partner Falmouth University
- Location: London, United Kingdom
- Website: https://www.fourthmonkey.co.uk

Fourth Monkey (formerly named Fourth Monkey Actor Training Company) is a drama school, theatre company and charity arts organisation.

Fourth Monkey provides vocational training in acting for stage and screen as well as preparing artists for voice acting and motion capture at their specialist training centre, The Monkey House.

Fourth Monkey was founded in 2010 by Charleen Qwaye and Steven Green.

== Overview ==
Fourth Monkey (the name is inspired by the fourth monkey of the three wise monkeys fable, Shizaru, who does ‘nothing other than good.’) was formed by Steven Green, the company's Artistic Director, with the intention to create an alternative to conventional drama school training.

Fourth Monkey has a particular focus on training artists to create their own opportunities. Their Emerging Artists programme provides support and mentorship to new companies formed in training

Initially only a one-year course "The Year of the Monkey" the company, in 2012, began providing a two-year programme ("Two Year Rep") as well. Today, Fourth Monkey offers undergraduate and postgraduate degree courses and the curriculum has been celebrated for its decolonisation by the awarding partner Falmouth University.

Alongside Fourth Monkey's approach to training, the company is noted for its theatre productions. Although performing in a wide range of theatrical styles and genres, they are generally recognised for their work in repertory theatre, ensemble theatre, physical theatre, in-yer-face theatre, site-specific theatre, and fringe theatre.

The Fourth Monkey Ensemble is the professional touring arm of the company. Born out of the training programme, the company's aim is to deliver original, physical theatre nationally and internationally. The Ensemble toured in 2014 – 2015 with their acclaimed Offies nominated production of The Elephant Man, which was supported by Arts Council England.

Fourth Monkey performed annually at the Edinburgh Festival Fringe (from 2010 – 2018), where they earned a following. The company has since shifted their focus towards partaking in the Camden Fringe, performing annually at the festival since 2017.

Fourth Monkey has collaborated – and created work in association – with theatre companies such as All In Theatre, Clay & Diamonds, Complicité, Fevered Sleep, Rhum & Clay, Shunt, The Spanish Theatre Company, Theatre Re, Theatre Témoin, and Told by an Idiot.

The company also offers a variety of short courses and intensive programmes.

== The Monkey House ==
In September 2015, the company announced they had set up their own premises "The Monkey House" on Seven Sisters Road near Finsbury Park, having previously taught in locations such as Jacksons Lane.

The Monkey House is also a London Fringe performance space, and since 2017 has annually played host to a number of shows for the Camden Fringe.

== List of productions and performances ==
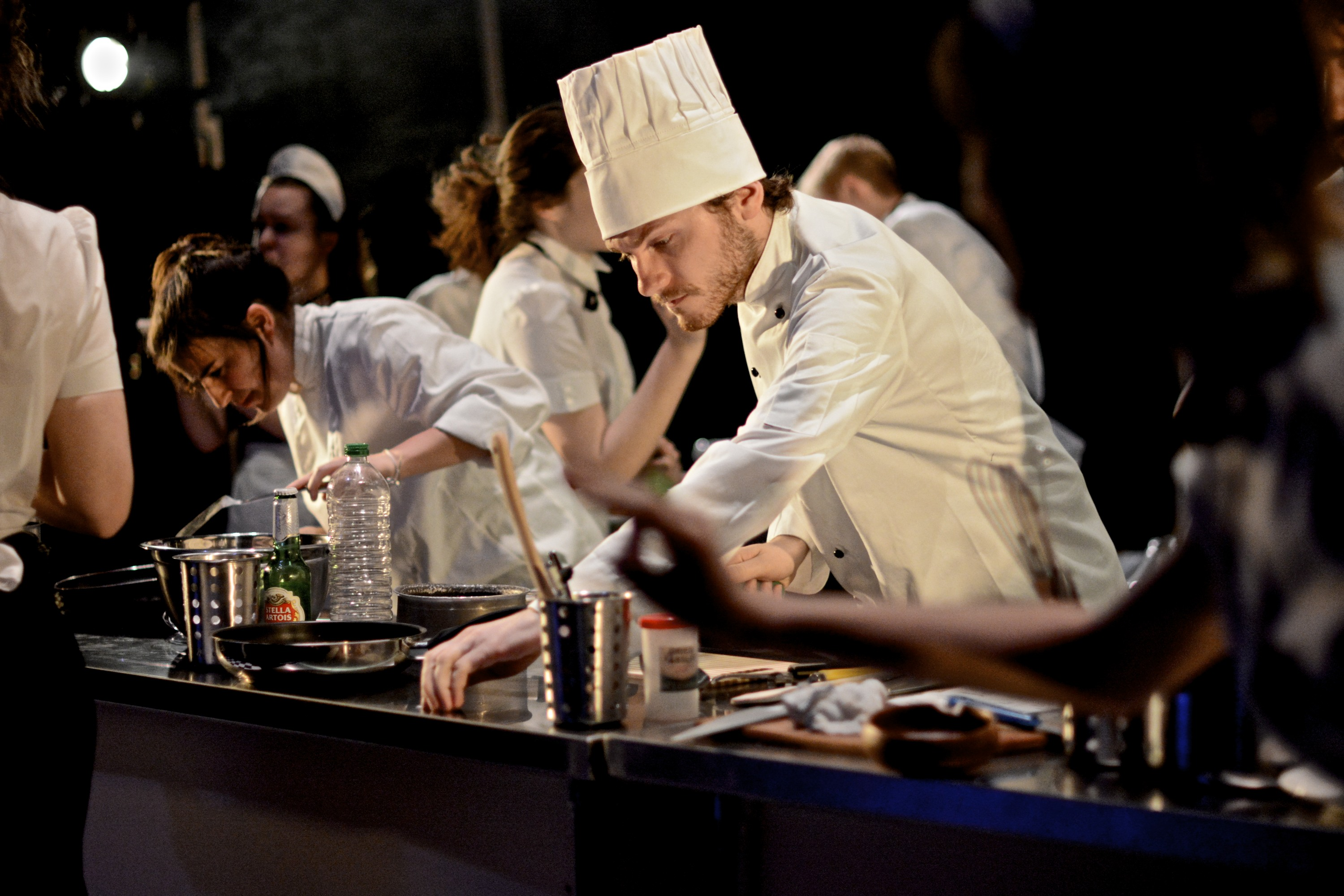
The Kitchen: from Fourth Monkey's May 2014 performance of Arnold Wesker's play

Fourth Monkey has a long history of both audience and critical reviews for their performances of established texts and company-devised projects.

=== 2019 ===
Camden Fringe Season 2019
Two Year Rep production

- Valhalla devised by Fourth Monkey (Camden Fringe)

Fourth Monkey's Cult Season (YOM productions)

- Witness written by Mia Jerome (Camden Fringe)
- 909 written by Abi Smith (Camden Fringe)
- Sannyas written by Mia Jerome (Camden Fringe)

Two Year Rep – First Year Devised Show 2019

- RebelRebelRebelRebelRebel. Please? devised by Fourth Monkey in association with Rhum & Clay (The Monkey House)

Fourth Monkey at The Cervantes 2019
A showcase of performed excerpts from translations of Spanish and Latin American plays. Performed in association with The Cervantes Theatre, London.

- Yerma by Simon Stone after Federico García Lorca (The Cervantes Theatre, London)
- The Unwritten Law by Felipe Santander (The Cervantes Theatre, London)
- All About My Mother by Samuel Adamson after Pedro Almodóvar (The Cervantes Theatre, London)
- The Little Pony by Paco Bezerra (The Cervantes Theatre, London)

Redemption Season (Two Year Rep Contemporary Season 2019)

- The Love of the Nightingale by Timberlake Wertenbaker (The Monkey House)
- The Lower Depths by Maxim Gorky (The Monkey House)

YOM Devised Season 2019

- Heroes devised by Fourth Monkey (The Monkey House)
- An Open Mind devised by Fourth Monkey (The Monkey House)

Of Land & Sea Season (Two Year Rep Classical Season 2019)

- Henry V by William Shakespeare (The Monkey House)
- Pericles by William Shakespeare (The Monkey House)

=== 2018 ===
Edinburgh & Camden Fringe Seasons 2018
Two Year Rep production:

- The Woman and the Canvas was devised by Theatre Re in a co-production with Fourth Monkey. (Edinburgh Fringe; Camden Fringe)
  Reworked from their 2017 devised show The Woman on the Chair.

Scandal Season (YOM productions, part of the 2018 Camden Fringe)

- Bombshells performed by graduates of the Year of the Monkey course (Camden Fringe)
- Fatty performed by graduates of the Year of the Monkey course (Camden Fringe)
- Kidnap! performed by graduates of the Year of the Monkey course (Camden Fringe)

Fourth Monkey at The Cervantes 2018
A showcase of performed excerpts from new translations of Spanish and Latin American plays. Performed in association with The Cervantes Theatre, London.

- The Opera Cleaners by Ramón Griffero (The Cervantes Theatre, London)
- Divine Words by Ramón del Valle-Inclán (The Cervantes Theatre, London)
- When Five Years Pass by Federico García Lorca (The Cervantes Theatre, London)
- The House of Bernarda Alba by Federico García Lorca (The Cervantes Theatre, London)

Two Year Rep – First Year Devised Show 2018

- The War of the Worlds devised by Fourth Monkey in association with Rhum & Clay, adapted from the novel of the same name by H. G. Wells (The Monkey House)

Season of War (Two Year Rep Contemporary Season 2018)

- Widows by Ariel Dorfman and Tony Kushner (The Monkey House)
- Ghetto by Joshua Sobol (The Monkey House)

YOM Devised Season 2018

- Adrift devised by Fourth Monkey (The Monkey House)
- Faire des Marques (Mark Making) devised by Fourth Monkey (The Monkey House)

Fire & Water Season (Two Year Rep Classical Season 2018)

- Romeo and Juliet by William Shakespeare (The Monkey House)
- The Tempest by William Shakespeare (The Monkey House)

=== 2017 ===
Edinburgh & Camden Fringe Seasons 2017
Two Year Rep productions:

- The Burial of the Rats devised by Fourth Monkey, adapted from the short story of the same name by Bram Stoker (Edinburgh Fringe; Camden Fringe)
- Titus Andronicus by William Shakespeare (Edinburgh Fringe; Camden Fringe)

Fourth Monkey's Women of Greece (YOM productions, part of Edinburgh & Camden Fringe Seasons 2017)

- Medusa by Ezra Elia (Edinburgh Fringe; Camden Fringe)
- Persephone by Ami Sayers (Edinburgh Fringe; Camden Fringe)
- Pandora by Ami Sayers (Edinburgh Fringe; Camden Fringe)

Orlando: The Queer Element

- Orlando: The Queer Element devised by Clay & Diamonds in association with Fourth Monkey, loosely inspired from Orlando by Virginia Woolf (Hanbury Hall; Knole House)

Two Year Rep – First Year Devised Show 2017

- The Woman on the Chair devised by Fourth Monkey in association with Theatre Re (The Monkey House)
  Later reworked as their 2018 Edinburgh and Camden Fringe production The Woman & the Canvas.

Conflict Season(Two Year Rep Contemporary Season 2017)

- Mother Courage and Her Children by Bertolt Brecht, translated by John Willett (The Monkey House)
- 3 Winters by Tena Štivičić (The Monkey House)

YOM Devised Season 2017

- Goblin Market devised by Fourth Monkey (The Monkey House)
- Refugee Blues devised by Fourth Monkey (The Monkey House)

Fall of Man Season (Two Year Rep Classical Season 2017)

- The White Devil by John Webster (The Monkey House)
- Julius Caesar by William Shakespeare (The Monkey House)

=== 2016 ===
Fourth Monkey's Genesis and Revelation (Edinburgh Fringe Season 2016)
Two Year Rep productions:

- Ascension: Part II by Steve Green (Edinburgh Fringe)
- Ascension: Part I by Steve Green (Edinburgh Fringe)

YOM productions:

- Sodom by Ami Sayers (Edinburgh Fringe)
- The Ark by Steve Green (Edinburgh Fringe)
- The Whale by Steve Green (Edinburgh Fringe)

The Russian Season (Two Year Rep Contemporary Season 2016)

- Plasticine by Vassily Sigarev, translated by Sasha Dugdale (The Monkey House)
- Terrorism by The Presnyakov brothers, translated by Sarsha Dugdale (The Monkey House)
- The Grain Store by Natalia Vorozhbit, translated by Sasha Dugdale (The Monkey House)

Two Year Rep – First Year Devised Show 2016

- Ruckus (Part I + II) devised by Fourth Monkey in association with Shunt (The Monkey House)

YOM Devised Season 2016

- Question Mark devised by Fourth Monkey (The Monkey House)
- The Nesting Place devised by Fourth Monkey (The Monkey House)

The Revenge Season (Two Year Rep Classical Season 2016)

- The Winter's Tale by William Shakespeare (The Monkey House)
- The Revenger's Tragedy by Thomas Middleton (The Monkey House)

=== 2015 ===
Fourth Monkey's Grimm Tales (Edinburgh Fringe Season 2015)

- Little Red Cap by Ami Sayers (Edinburgh Fringe)
- Hansel & Gretel adapted by Toby Clarke (Edinburgh Fringe)
- The Bloody Countess devised by Fourth Monkey (Edinburgh Fringe)
- Rapunzel adapted by Angela Gasparetto (Edinburgh Fringe)

Transformation Season

- The Odyssey by Hattie Naylor, adapted from the epic poem by Homer (Trinity Buoy Wharf)
- The Wonderful Ice Cream Suit by Ray Bradbury (Trinity Buoy Wharf)

Contemporary Season 2015

- Don Juan Comes Back From The War by Ödön von Horváth, in a new version by Duncan Macmillan (Jacksons Lane)
- The Public by Federico García Lorca (in association with The Spanish Theatre Company) (Jacksons Lane)
- Hellcats devised by Fourth Monkey in association with Told By An Idiot (Jacksons Lane)

Shakespeare's Comedies Season

- As You Like It by William Shakespeare (Trinity Buoy Wharf)
- A Midsummer Night's Dream by William Shakespeare (Trinity Buoy Wharf)
- Much Ado about Nothing by William Shakespeare (Trinity Buoy Wharf)

Tamburlaine The Great

- Tamburlaine the Great: Part II by Christopher Marlowe (Jacksons Lane)
- Tamburlaine the Great: Part I by Christopher Marlowe (Jacksons Lane)

=== 2014 ===
Fourth Monkey Ensemble 2014/15

- The Elephant Man by Steve Green and David Ledger (tour 2014/15)

Edinburgh Fringe Season 2014

- Alice by Toby Clarke, adapted from the Alice novels by Lewis Carroll (Edinburgh Fringe Festival)
- Treasure Island adapted from the novel by Robert Louis Stevenson (Edinburgh Fringe Festival)
- The House of Bernarda Alba by Federico García Lorca (Edinburgh Fringe Festival)
- Can't Stay Away! by Mitch Mitchelson, adapted from David Posner's translation of The 22 Misfortunes of Harlequin by Carlo Goldoni (Edinburgh Fringe Festival)
- The Sad Story of the Sun and the Moon devised by Fourth Monkey (Edinburgh Fringe Festival)

Greek Season

- Rhesus by Euripides (Trinity Buoy Wharf, London)
- Lysistrata by Aristophanes (Trinity Buoy Wharf, London)

Shizaru Season

- The Kitchen by Arnold Wesker (Jackson's Lane, London)
- Vinegar Tom by Caryl Churchill (Jackson's Lane, London)
- The Iceman by Toby Clarke, adapted from the short story by Haruki Murakami (Jackson's Lane, London)

Trinity Buoy Wharf Season 2014

- Our Country's Good by Timberlake Wertenbaker (Trinity Buoy Wharf, London)
- Yerma by Federico García Lorca (Trinity Buoy Wharf, London)
- The Good Person of Szechwan by Bertolt Brecht (Trinity Buoy Wharf, London)

Marlowe Season

- The Jew of Malta by Christopher Marlowe (in association with Told By An Idiot) (Marlowe Studio, Canterbury, part of Marlowe450)
- The Massacre at Paris by Christopher Marlowe (Canterbury Cathedral crypt, part of Marlowe450)
- Faustus by Christopher Marlowe (Marlowe Studio, Canterbury, part of Marlowe450)

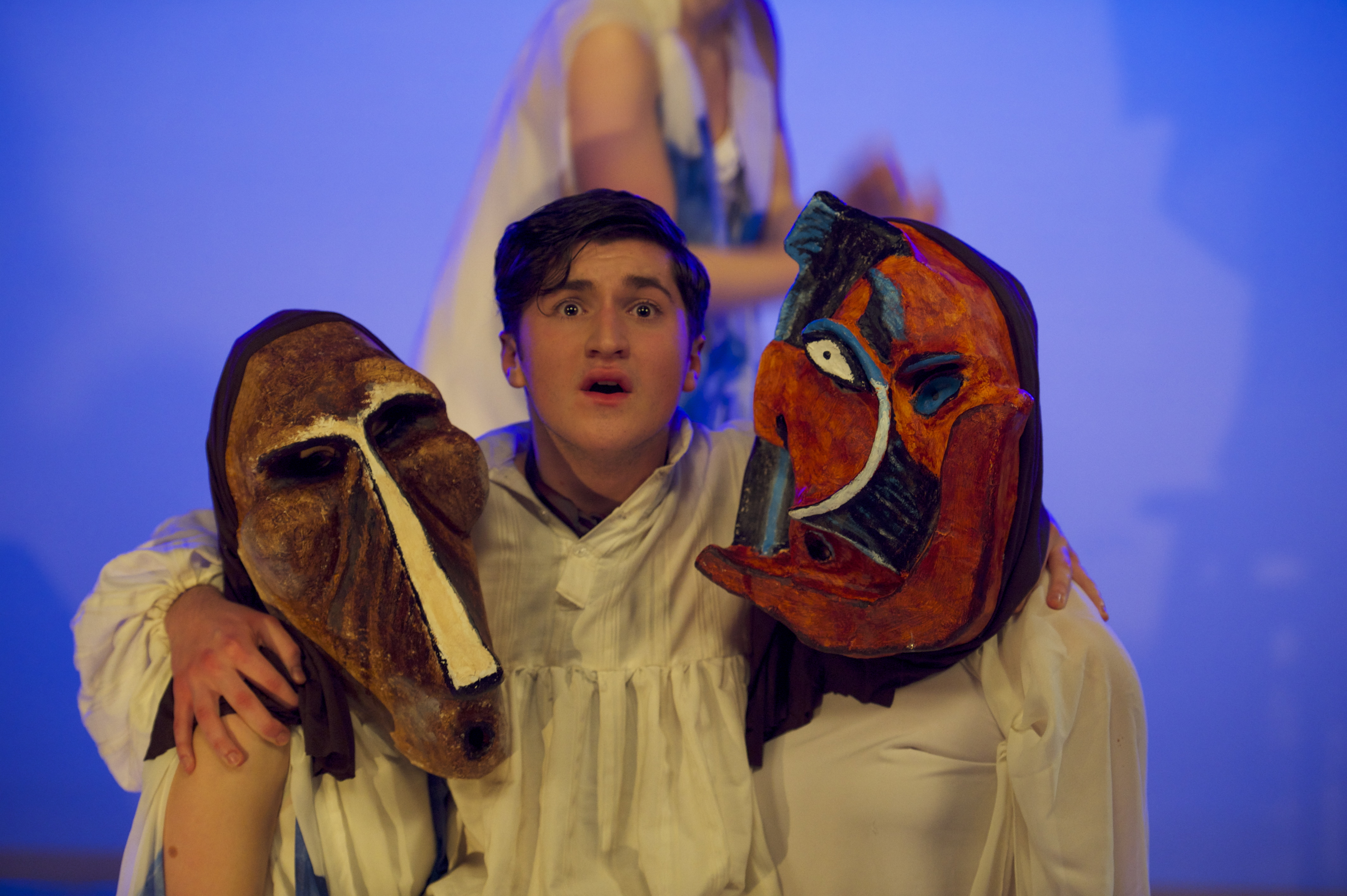
Sherwood Alexander in Fourth Monkey's February 2014 performance of The Peculiar Tale of Pablo Picasso and the Mona Lisa, by Steven Green

=== 2013 ===
Edinburgh Fringe Season 2013

- The Peculiar Tale of Pablo Picasso and the Mona Lisa by Steve Green (Edinburgh Fringe Festival; The Brockley Jack Studio, London 2014)
- One Flew Over the Cuckoo's Nest by Dale Wasserman, adapted from the novel of the same name by Ken Kesey (Edinburgh Fringe Festival)
- Sans Salomé by Toby Clarke (Edinburgh Fringe Festival)

Trinity Buoy Wharf Season 2013

- Paradise Lost devised by The Fourth Monkey Ensemble, adapted from the epic poem of the same name by John Milton (Trinity Buoy Wharf, London)
- Project Colony devised by The Fourth Monkey Ensemble, adapted from In the Penal Colony by Franz Kafka (Trinity Buoy Wharf, London)

=== 2012 ===
Edinburgh Fringe Season 2012

- 4.48 Psychosis by Sarah Kane (previously at Theatro Technis, London as part of Spring Rep Season 2012; Edinburgh Fringe Festival)
- The Elephant Man by Steve Green and David Ledger (Edinburgh Fringe Festival)
- Nights at the circus by Sarah-Jane Moloney and Steve Green, adapted from the novel by Angela Carter (Edinburgh Fringe Festival)
- The Erpingham Camp by Joe Orton (Edinburgh Fringe Festival)
- Divine Words by Ramón del Valle-Inclán (Edinburgh Fringe Festival)
- Minotaur conceived by Natalie Katsou and translated by Yannis Goumas (Edinburgh Fringe Festival)

London Spring Rep Season 2012

- Lord of the Flies by Nigel Williams, adapted from the novel by William Golding (Theatro Technis, London)
- The Bacchae by Euripides, translated by Ranjit Bolt (Theatro Technis, London)

=== 2011 ===
London Rep Season 2011

- Antigone by Sophocles, translated by Ranjit Bolt (Theatro Technis, London)
- The Love of the Nightingale by Timberlake Wertenbaker (Theatro Technis, London)
- The Threepenny Opera by Bertolt Brecht (Theatro Technis, London)

=== 2010 ===
- A Clockwork Orange by Anthony Burgess (Theatro Technis, London; Edinburgh Fringe Festival; Croydon Clocktower 2011)

== Awards ==
Year	Award Ceremony	Category	Nominee	Production	Result
2019	Offie	OffFest – Short Run	Fourth Monkey	Valhalla	Nominated
2015	The Stage	School of the Year	Fourth Monkey		Shortlisted
2015	Offie	Best Male Actor	Daniel Chrisostomou	The Elephant Man	Nominated
2015	Offie	Best Production	Fourth Monkey Ensemble	The Elephant Man	Nominated
2014	Edinburgh Fringe	Sell-Out Show	Fourth Monkey Two Year Rep	Alice	Won
2014	Offie	Best Set Designer	Zahra Mansouri	The Peculiar Tale of Pablo Picasso and the Mona Lisa	Nominated
2014	Offie	Best Costume Designer	Zahra Mansouri	The Peculiar Tale of Pablo Picasso and the Mona Lisa	Nominated
2014	Offie	Best Ensemble	Fourth Monkey	The Peculiar Tale of Pablo Picasso and the Mona Lisa	Nominated
2012	Offie	Best Lighting Designer	Pablo Baz	4.48 Psychosis	Nominated
2012	Amnesty International	Freedom of Expression Award	Fourth Monkey	The Elephant Man	Nominated
2012	Edinburgh Fringe	Sell-Out Show	Fourth Monkey	4.48 Psychosis	Won
2010	Edinburgh Fringe	Sell-Out Show	Fourth Monkey	A Clockwork Orange	Won
