= Greentop =

Greentop may refer to:

- Greentop, Missouri
- Greentop Circus in Sheffield
