= Robert Rowland Smith =

British philosopher

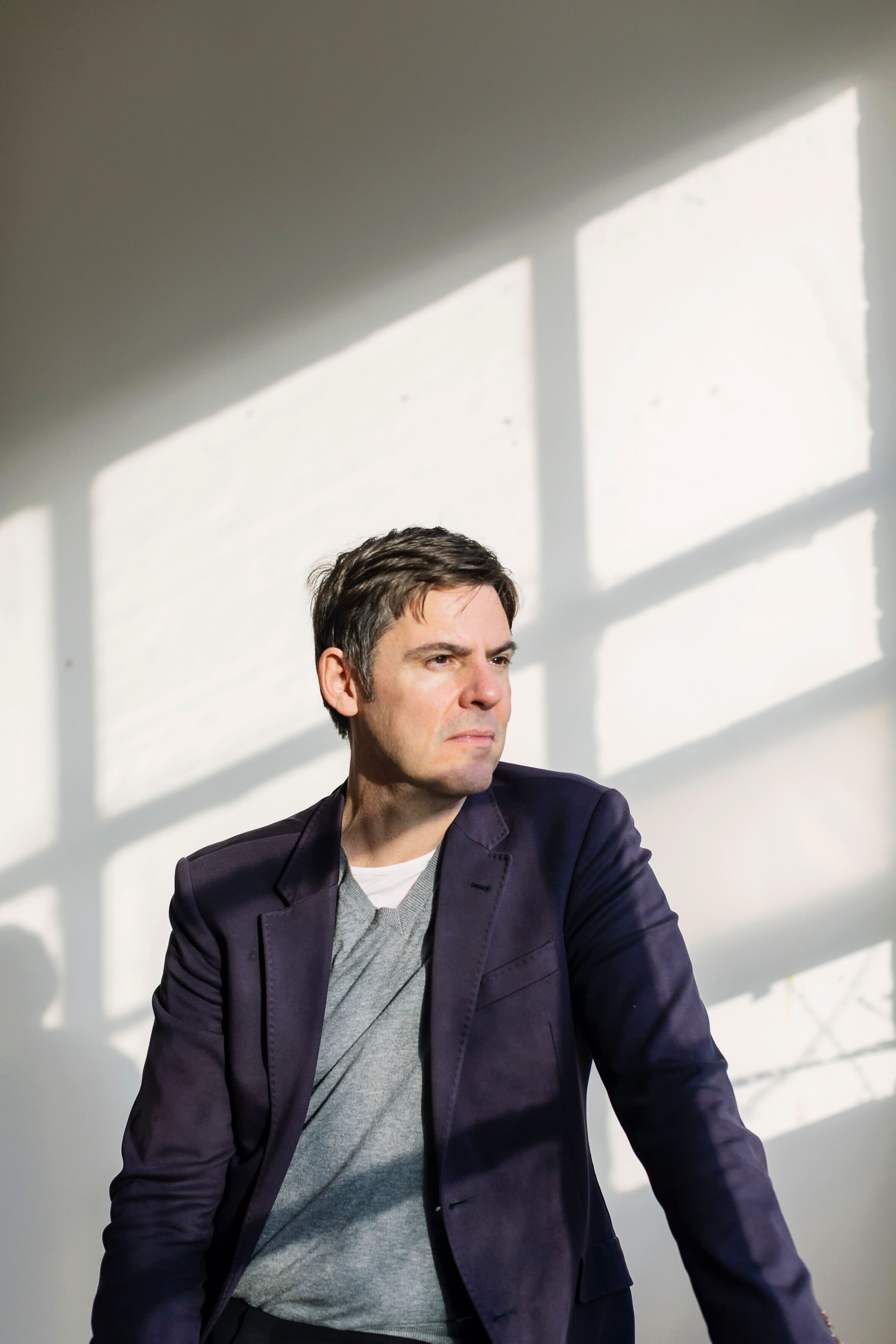
Robert Rowland Smith 2018

Robert Rowland Smith is a British author and philosopher. His books include Derrida and Autobiography (Cambridge University Press, 1995), Breakfast with Socrates: The Philosophy of Everyday Life (Profile Books, 2009), and AutoBioPhilosophy: An Intimate Story of What It Means to Be Human (4th Estate, 2018). He is a regular speaker at public and private events, addressing a wide range of topics that includes philosophy, psychology, politics, and art.

== Biography ==
Smith was born on 21 January, 1965. From 1975 to 1983, he attended Dulwich College in south London. He read English Language and Literature at Mansfield College, Oxford, where he was a Scholar, graduating in 1988 with a top First. From 1988 to 1990 Smith was a doctoral student at Wolfson College, Oxford, specialising in the work of French philosopher Jacques Derrida. In 1990, he was elected to a Fellowship by Examination ('Prize Fellowship') at All Souls College, Oxford. He was awarded a D.Phil. in 1991. While a Fellow of All Souls, Smith also held lectureships at both Mansfield College, Oxford and Hertford College, Oxford, and was a member of the English Faculty, lecturing on literary theory, modern poetry, and Shakespeare.

Smith left Oxford in 1998 to pursue a career in management consultancy, becoming a partner in a London-based firm in 2004. In 2009, Smith set up a company of his own in order to operate independently. He continues to be a Quondam Fellow of All Souls College, Oxford.

Smith has sat on the board of the Tavistock Institute of Medical Psychology and of the Institute of Art and Ideas. He is a founding faculty member of The School of Life, and from 2013 to 2015 was a faculty member of the London Graduate School based at Kingston University. In 2017 he stepped down from the editorial board of Angelaki: Journal of the Theoretical Humanities, an academic publication that he helped to found in 1993.

== Literary career ==
=== Books ===
Robert Rowland Smith is the author of seven books. Three of these are academic. Derrida and Autobiography (Cambridge University Press, 1995) was based on Smith's doctoral thesis, and won a Choice award for 'Outstanding Academic Title'. Death-Drive: Freudian Hauntings in Literature and Art (Edinburgh University Press, 2010) is an examination of Freud's metapsychological works in relation to other theorists of death including Heidegger, Durkheim and Pascal. On Modern Poetry: From Theory to Total Criticism (Continuum, 2012) also won a Choice award for 'Outstanding Academic Title'. The first part of the book examines theories of poetry; the second part is made up of close textual analysis of certain nineteenth and twentieth century poems.

Smith has written two works of popular philosophy: Breakfast with Socrates: The Philosophy of Everyday Life (Profile Books, 2009) and Driving with Plato: The Meaning of Life's Milestones (Profile Books, 2011). The former has been translated into twenty languages.

The Reality Test: Still Relying on Strategy? (Profile Books, 2014) draws on Smith's experience as a business adviser. It poses and seeks to answer forty-eight questions relating to business vision, market strategy, organisational performance, and leadership.

Smith's most recent book is AutoBioPhilosophy: An Intimate Story of What It Means to Be Human (4th Estate, 2018). The book combines the genres of autobiography and philosophy in order to explore themes such as fate, love, spirituality, death, friendship, and creativity.

In addition, Smith wrote the text for an art book by Israeli photographer Ori Gersht, entitled Gersht's Ghosts (Photoworks, 2012). He also contributed a foreword to the 2015 design publication, Patternity: A New Way of Seeing: The Inspirational Power of Pattern (Octopus, 2015).

=== Journalism ===
From 2009 to 2012, Robert wrote the To Be Or Not To Be column in the Sunday Times Magazine, that examined moral dilemmas. He recorded a weekly video blog for the online version of the same publication, looking at current affairs through the lens of philosophy. He has written articles for numerous other publications including Intelligent Life, The Independent on Sunday, The Guardian, The Observer, New Scientist, Psychologies and Photoworks. He contributed articles to the first three editions of The Alpine Review, published in Toronto by Louis-Jacques Darveau. He has also been profiled in The Sunday Telegraph and Time Out.

=== Radio, television and film ===
Smith has broadcast talks across several platforms. These include a verbal essay entitled Beyond the Age of Ideas for Four Thought for BBC Radio 4, a podcast on Derrida and forgiveness for the Philosophy Bites series; several videos for the Institute of Art and Ideas, filmed at the HowTheLightGetsIn Festival; several videos for The School of Life, including 'in conversation' events with Steven Pinker and Jared Diamond; a series of interviews with entrepreneurs in different fields, entitled Innovators on Innovation; and videos for the Royal Society of Arts (Beyond Ideas and Carl Jung - Legacy and Influence). Other BBC Radio and TV programmes on which Smith has appeared include Night Waves, The Human Zoo, The Review Show and Today.

Smith has appeared in two films by the independent production company, Heraclitus Pictures. These are Do Not Read This (directed by Joanna Callaghan, HDV, 29 minutes, 2012), in which he plays the part of a publisher; and Love in the Post (directed by Joanna Callaghan, HDV, 75 minutes, 2014), in which he plays a university professor.

=== Public speaking ===
Smith has spoken to audiences in the UK, France, Norway, the United States, Japan, Lithuania, Poland, Switzerland and El Salvador on subjects including love, enlightenment, and innovation. In 1992 he was invited by the British Council to undertake a lecture tour in Romania, and in the 1990s was closely involved with the Oxford Amnesty Lectures that brought leading thinkers to Oxford.

Other fora to which Smith has contributed include: Institute of Contemporary Arts (on Derrida), Hayward Gallery (on concepts of light), the London School of Economics (on the meaning of life), the British Library (on theories of knowledge), the Petrie Museum (on concepts of time), Off Grid (on not knowing) and the Aye Write Festival (on the philosophy of everyday life).

With the philosopher Mark Vernon, Smith performs a 'Philosophy Slam', an improvised ideas format. The pair appear regularly at the Wilderness Festival and other venues, and have featured twice at the Camden Comedy Club at the Camden Head in London in support of comedian Pippa Evans.

=== Appearance in works by others ===
Robert Rowland Smith is the subject of an abstract sculpture by Dutch-Monegasque artist, Adeline de Monseignat, entitled Robert.

Smith is one of the walking companions featured in A London Safari by Rose Rouse. He appears in Monique Roffey's memoir, With the Kisses of His Mouth and in the novel by Nicholas Royle entitled An English Guide to Birdwatching.

== Bibliography ==
- Smith, Robert Rowland (2018). AutoBioPhilosophy: An intimate story of what it means to be human. 4th Estate. ISBN 9780008218461.
- Smith, Robert Rowland (2012). On Modern Poetry: From theory to total criticism (Paperback). Bloomsbury (published 13 September 2012).
- Smith, Robert Rowland (2011). Driving with Plato : the meaning of life's milestones. London: Profile. ISBN 978-1-84668-305-3. OCLC 701443476.
- Smith, Robert Rowland (19 May 2010). Death-drive: Freudian hauntings in literature and art. Edinburgh University Press. ASIN 0748640398.
- Rowland., Smith, Robert (2010). Breakfast with Socrates : the philosophy of everyday life. Profile. ISBN 978-1-84668-241-4. OCLC 528411241.
- Smith, Robert Rowland (2008). Derrida and Autobiography. Cambridge University Press (published 12 January 2008). ASIN 0521465818.

== Critical reception ==
=== Breakfast with Socrates ===
'Philosophy made accessible and applied to the quotidian...manages to be funny without underestimating the reader.' - Review by Emmanuelle Smith for The Financial Times, 26 October 2009

'I am often asked to recommend a good introduction to philosophy - now I've discovered one. There are plenty of books but mostly they're either the 'wrong kind' of philosophy or they are terribly written. Smith's work is witty, inventive and intelligent - Carl Schmitt on arguing with your partner, Jacques Derrida on booking a holiday - and brilliantly shows how grounded High Theory really is.' - Times Higher Education Supplement

'...a very thoughtful and continuously entertaining picture of human behavior. Smith adequately and expertly matches the right classical mind or system of thought with each chapter subject without making it seem like a stretch. Rooted deeply in philosophy and psychology, the book is never too complex or confusing that anyone with a normal level of reading comprehension would have a problem with.' - Review by Curtis Silver for wired.com, 3 December 2010

=== Driving with Plato ===
'A friendly guide to "the meaning of life's milestones" from birth, to learning to walk, starting school and on to passing your driving test, marrying and having a mid-life crisis, retiring and dying.' - Review by Lindesay Irvine for The Guardian, 19 February 2011

=== On Modern Poetry ===
'On Modern Poetry dazzles and illuminates, as does poetry itself. The book is an exciting intervention in poetic criticism, and the zest with which the book apprehends as well as comprehends its material will ensure that all kinds of readers interested in poetry will be enthused to think more carefully about its idioms, strange logics, and its genres. In bringing together intuitive and intellectual attention without simply pre-empting the distinction or its affects, the book achieves what it sets out to do.' - Dr Anthony Mellors, Reader in Poetry and Poetics, Birmingham City University, UK

'Smith's writing moves with an ease and elegance that can belie the, sometimes breath-taking, flair, reach and focus of his readings…it has much to recommend it to a wide audience, from general readers, to students, to specialists.' - Dr Clare Connors, University of East Anglia, UK

=== Death-Drive ===
'This is a rich and fascinating work. Smith provides a lucid, probing and astute overview of the death drive in Freud, but also leads the reader into strange and compelling new terrain, exploring the notion that works of art have 'an unconscious of their own'. This is an important new contribution to a topic that remains controversial in psychoanalysis and culture more generally.' - Nicholas Royle, University of Sussex

'The death-drive has haunted psychoanalytic theory since its first appearance in Freud's Beyond the Pleasure Principle. Rowland Smith brings new life to this grim hypothesis, tracing the rhetorical adventures of the death-drive through Freud's works and those of his defenders and adversaries. Sinuously argued and vividly expressed, Death-Drive will appeal both to beginners and to seasoned readers of psychoanalysis and literature. Rarely has death been discussed with such vitality.' - Maud Ellmann, Donald and Marilyn Keough Professor of Irish Studies, University of Notre Dame

=== The Reality Test ===
'By approaching the perennial problems of business through a highly original set of emotionally-charged questions, Smith brings an extraordinary array of insights to the challenges of management and leadership. Brilliant - a tour de force.' - Jules Goddard, author of Uncommon Sense, Common Nonsense

'Practical, wise and very much based in reality, this book will make anyone running a business a more shrewd, and probably a more successful, leader.' - Andrew Cahn, former CEO of UK Trade and Investment

'I regard Robert Rowland Smith as simply the most intelligent person I know. After reading this book you will understand why.' - Guy Fraser-Sampson, Senior Fellow, Cass Business School

'The Reality Test' cuts through turgid corporate "leadership speak" to get the heart of the matter - it should be required reading for any aspiring leader. If 'Fred the Shred' of HBOS had taken the Reality Test, perhaps we wouldn't be living through the biggest recession since the 1930s.' - Lord Victor O. Adebowale CBE, CEO of Turning Point

'Robert Rowland Smith asks the practical questions that really matter to business leaders - this book will do more than make you think, it will make you do something.' - Matt Kingdon, co-founder of ?What If! and author of The Science of Serendipity

'Intriguing…thought-provoking.' - Review by Frank Dillon for Irish Times, 12 August 2013
