= Brightside, Sheffield =

Suburb of Sheffield, Yorkshire, England

Coordinates: 53.404°N 1.435°W

Brightside
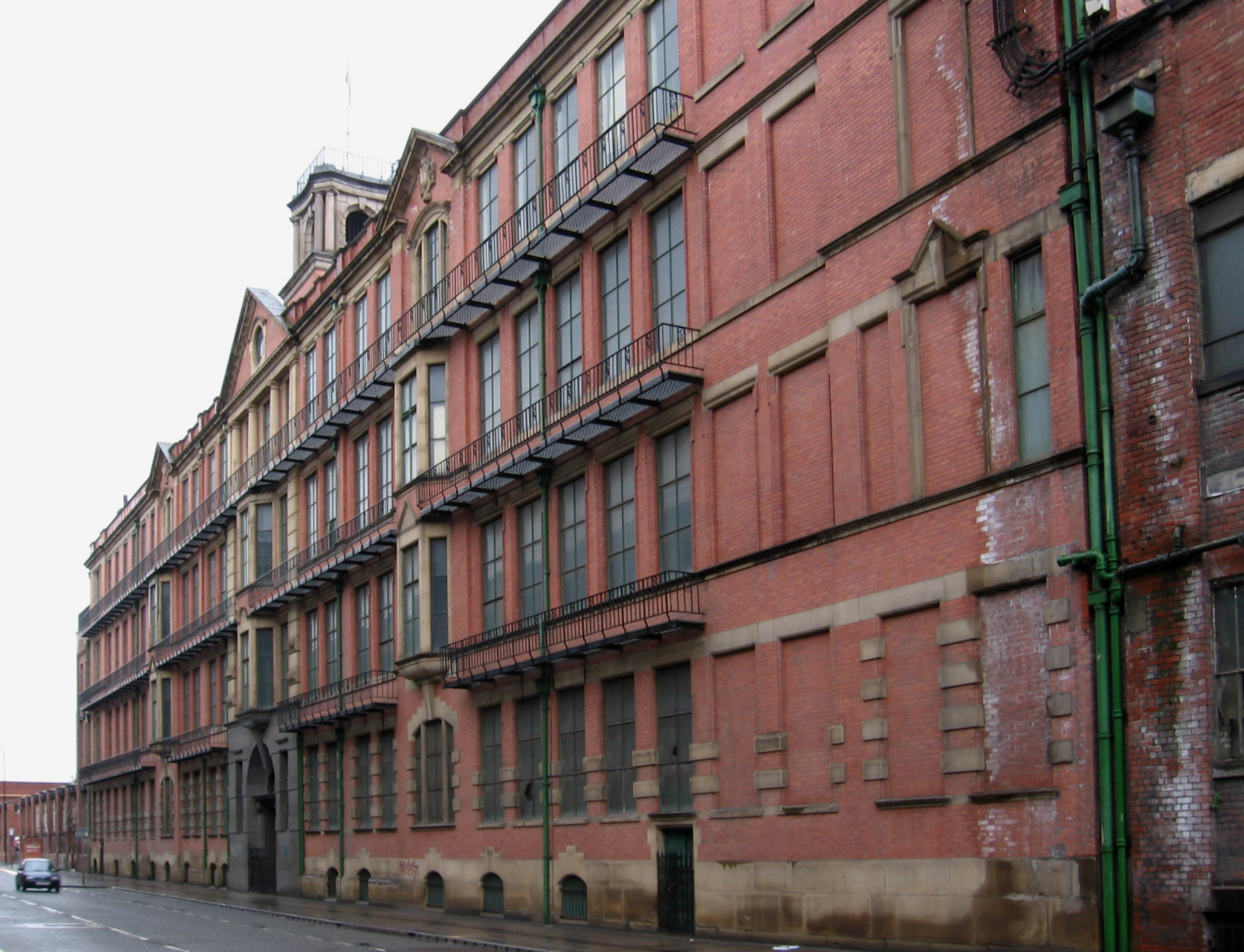
- Vickers Building

- Location within Sheffield
- OS grid reference: SK375898
- Metropolitan borough: City of Sheffield
- Metropolitan county: South Yorkshire
- Region: Yorkshire and the Humber
- Country: England
- Sovereign state: United Kingdom
- Post town: SHEFFIELD
- Postcode district: S9
- Dialling code: 0114
- Police: South Yorkshire
- Fire: South Yorkshire
- Ambulance: Yorkshire
- UK Parliament: Sheffield Brightside and Hillsborough

Brightside is an industrial area of Sheffield, South Yorkshire, England lying on a hill north of Attercliffe and the River Don.

Brightside was recorded in the fifteenth century as "Brekesherth", when it was home to some mills. Brightside Bierlow was one of the six original divisions of the township of Sheffield, including all the land in the town north of the Don - reaching as far as the Wicker and Neepsend.

The first work on the Sheffield and Rotherham Railway was the opening of a cutting in Brightside in 1837. Brightside railway station was opened along with the line in 1838, but closed in 1995. Now the nearest railway station is in Meadowhall (which geographically is in the Shiregreen and Brightside ward) just south of Wincobank. In the 1830s, the only industry in the village was a forge on the river bank. A guide produced for the opening of the railway described Brightside as being "...much frequented by pleasure parties from Sheffield. On every fine Sabbath especially, the sallow artizan may be seen wending his way thither, to inhale the freshness of the country air, and enjoy the beautiful and extensive prospect which the hill affords. The opening of the railway has not been productive of much benefit to it in this respect. Those who, when performing their peregrinations on foot, were compelled to confine them within a circuit of a mile or two round Sheffield, can now ride to Rotherham for sixpence; and the consequence is, that the publicans of Brightside have the mortification of beholding their quondam customers gliding past their very doors to consign to the pockets of the more fortunate retailers of spirits in a more distant town, those gains which they had been accustomed to calculate upon as theirs."

St Thomas' Church opened in 1854, and now serves at the training school for Greentop Circus.

By 1860, industries were growing in the area, with steel and cutlery manufacture being the main trades. Industry continued to grow, and by the early 1970s, it was mostly industrial, and home to a major railway marshalling yard.

Sheffield Brightside was also the name of one of Sheffield's six Parliamentary constituencies until declining population lead to the formation of the larger Sheffield Brightside and Hillsborough.
