= Ilmatila =

Finnish contemporary circus company

Ilmatila is a Finnish contemporary circus company whose performances combine aerial acrobatics and other circus techniques with other art forms such as animated projections, contemporary dance and live music. Many of the company’s performances also have a strong site-specific or site-responsive aspect, meaning that they are designed to be performed in non-traditional venues or could be adapted to fit different venues.

== History ==
Ilmatila company was founded by aerialist/choreographer Ilona Jäntti and architect/animator Tuula Jeker in 2007.

The first performance of Ilmatila, Muualla/Elsewhere, premiered in Jacksons Lane in London in 2009 and it has been touring in circus and dance festivals in Europe, USA and Panama. The performance is based on an interaction between the performer Ilona Jäntti and an animation projection on stage. Animated environment and emerging creatures are affected by the performer and vice versa.

Since Muualla, Ilmatila has continued to develop its artistic expression by exploring the possibilities of combining different art forms to aerial acrobatics and designing performances outside traditional theatre stages, making people encounter circus in their everyday world.

== Notable works ==
- Handspun is a piece combining cello music and aerial acrobatics with vertical and diagonal ropes. It was commissioned by the Royal Opera House, London, and premiered in 2012 in ROH Linbury Studio Theatre. The music is composed by Ilmatila’s long-term collaborator Luke Styles.
- Gangewifre is a project on thin ropes that create an illusion of weightlessness. The rigging of the piece is like a living organism, a weave of thin ropes that transform their shape according to the venue. It was commissioned by Italian Teatro a Corte Festival and premiered in the garden of The Royal Castle of Racconigi in 2013. Further on, it has been performed in theatres and circus tents but also in parks where the ropes are suspended between trees.
- Yablochkov Candle is Ilmatila’s first collaboration with musician Aino Venna premiered in Cirko Festival in Helsinki in 2016. Yablochkov Candle combines a concert and an aerial acrobatic performance. Aino Venna’s music is influenced by French chanson and old school rock ‘n’ roll. The starting point of Ilona Jäntti’s choreography was the manipulation of the light on stage; several aerial scenes are performed with custom-made aerial lamps and lights, and with curtains that are opened at times letting the natural light in.
- Atlas is a family-friendly mix of contemporary circus, animation and architecture that combines Ilona Jäntti’s aerial acrobatics with Tuula Jeker’s projections. Atlas is a story about fleeting, yet meaningful encounters from the furthest reaches of space to the depths of the seas. The premiere was part of Helsinki Festival’s official program in 2019.
- E minor is one of the latest Ilmatila performances, an aerial hoop solo piece, is choreographed to Cello Sonata in E minor, Op. 35 by Croatian composer Dora Pejačević. In addition to aerialist Ilona Jäntti, there are live musicians on stage. E minor premiered in Circus Village Festival in Sandvika, Norway in 2021.
