= The Generating Company =

Origin
- Country: United Kingdom & France
- Founder(s): Paul Cockle
- Year founded: 2001

Information
- Traveling show?: Yes

The Generating Company was a touring circus company producing large shows and events around the world. Most recent shows include 'Voyage de la Vie' at Resorts World Sentosa in Singapore and 'Aqua' the world's largest water show located in Shenzhen southern China. The company also produced events and ran training programs for artists and young people. The company was based in London, England and Le Buisson-de-Cadouin, France. The company ceased operations in early 2017.

== History ==
=== Formation ===
The Generating Company founder, Paul Cockle, was Production Manager for the Millennium Dome Show directed by Peter Gabriel, Mark Fisher and Micha Bergese, in 1998 to create a show for the Millennium Experience, an exhibition hosted at the Millennium Dome to welcome the third millennium. The team turned to Circus Space, now the National Centre for Circus Arts, which was the first centre in the UK to offer a degree in circus arts. With little more than a year until opening night, Circus Space formed an accredited programme and trained 87 aerial performers for the Dome show.

The Dome show premiered on New Year's Eve, 1999. While the Dome itself was mired in controversy and financial woes, the show opened to critical success. With only a year-long contract at the Dome, many of the show's performers considered a return to Circus Space to continue their careers. When the show closed at the end of 2000, about 20 of the performers returned to Circus Space to form The Generating Company, a small travelling company that retained many of the characteristics of the original Dome performance.

Following the creation of the Dome Company, Paul founded The Generating Company in September 2000. Together with Mark Fisher and a number of artists from the Dome, the company grew over 15 years producing shows throughout the world including large scale productions in Singapore, Shenzhen, Osaka and Dubai.

=== Financing and Schools ===
Following their success at the Dome and Circus Space, The Generating Company received a £70,000 grant from the National Endowment for Science Technology and the Arts and grants from the Arts Council England to begin a touring company. After a local show, Storm, performed at Circus Space in Hoxton, The Generating Company began pursuing a "fusion of professional training with an extended performance contract linked to future touring opportunities." It opened its first school in 2002, offering summer courses devised for children interested in circus skills. It also hosted programs at Trinity Buoy Wharf through 2009.

In 2008, The Generating Company moved the majority of its professional schooling and develop a creative centre at Le Buisson-de-Cadouin, France. Paul Cockle explained that setting up the company in France offered the chance to develop a residential centre where artists can live and work together. The Generating Company still has administration offices in London but its core operation is based in France.

== Shows ==
Among its most notable productions were 'Voyage de la Vie' and 'Aqua.'

=== Voyage de la Vie ===
Premiering at Resorts World Sentosa in Singapore, 'Voyage de la Vie' was a fantasy circus musical that told the story of a boy's journey to adulthood. The show featured an international cast of acrobats, dancers, and musicians, and was praised for its elaborate set designs, innovative choreography, and original music. It became one of the highlights of Singapore's entertainment scene, attracting visitors from all over the world.

=== Aqua ===
Aqua was a water show that depicts the relationship between nature and individuals, especially the necessity of water sources, and was held for two consecutive years daily in the Shenzhen region of China. It was as a large water show. This ambitious production integrated water effects with traditional circus acts, creating a mesmerizing spectacle. The show included synchronized swimming, high-diving stunts, and intricate water-based illusions, setting a new standard for aquatic performances.

Aqua was a show about humanity’s desire to harness the forces of nature and how this desire can impact us all. The show reminds the audience that when nature is threatened, we are all ultimately in its control.

The creative producer/designer was Mark Fisher, the director was Abigail Yeates, the music producer was Nick Crofts, the composer was Akintayo Akinbode, and the props/set designer was Mick Bearwish. The show also included 587 international performers.

== Dragons' Den ==
The Generating Company successfully appeared on the Dragons' Den in December 2005. Represented by Paul Cockle, Peter Jones and Theo Paphitis decided to invest in the company. Together they invested £160,000 into the company and owned a 40% stake.
