= Etcetera Theatre =

Pub theatre in Camden Town, London

Coordinates: 51.5406°N 0.1444°W

- Oxford Arms
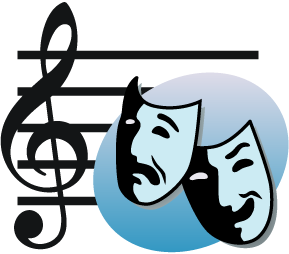
- An image of Etcetera Theatre
- Interactive map of Etcetera Theatre
- Address: Camden High Street; London, NW1; United Kingdom
- Owner: David Bidmead
- Capacity: 42 seats
- Type: Pub theatre
- Public transit: Camden Town; Camden Road

Construction
- Opened: 1986; 40 years ago

Website
- http://www.etceteratheatrecamden.com

The Etcetera Theatre is a fringe venue for theatre and comedy. It was founded in 1986 by David Bidmead and is situated above The Oxford Arms pub in Camden Town, in the London Borough of Camden.

The Theatre won the 1996 Guinness Ingenuity Award for Pub Theatre and was nominated for the 1996 Peter Brook Empty Space Award.

The Etcetera is a key venue in August's Camden Fringe.

== Productions ==
Over 2,500 productions have been staged at the Etcetera, including runs by Russell Brand, Simon Amstell, Al Murray, Milton Jones, Mark Thomas, Robin Ince, We Are Klang, Bill Bailey, Jerry Sadowitz, Russell Howard and Richard Herring.

Premieres held at the theatre include The Westwoods by Alan Ayckbourn, Between The Lines by Paul Todd and Blue Jam by Chris Morris. Kafka's Dick by Alan Bennett, was rewritten by Bennett for performance at the Etcetera.

== Selected Productions ==
- Kafka's Dick by Alan Bennett, rewritten by him for performance at the Etcetera
- Blue Jam by Chris Morris which transferred to Riverside Studios
- The premieres of The Westwoods and Between the Lines by Alan Ayckbourn and Paul Todd
- Bondage by David Hines - toured UK and Europe and became the Ken Russell film Whore
- Warm-up gigs for comedy acts such as Simon Amstell, Russell Brand, Al Murray, Milton Jones, Mark Thomas, Robin Ince, We Are Klang, Bill Bailey, Jerry Sadowitz, Russell Howard and Richard Herring
- Fringe Report Award winner Adult Child / Dead Child
- Fringe First winning Stefan Golaszewski Speaks About A Girl He Once Loved and Stefan Golaszewski is a Widower both previewed at the Etcetera and were performed as a double bill at the Bush Theatre.
- The premiere of The Six Wives of Timothy Leary by Phillip De Gouveia
- Fringe Report Award winner The Bubonic Play
- The first performances of Tim Fountain: Sex Addict, which transferred to the Royal Court
- Edinburgh Fringe First winner What I Heard About Iraq
- The premiere of Bill Hicks: Slight Return which went on to the West End and a world tour
- The stage version of Jonathan Safran Foer's novel Everything is Illuminated, adapted by Simon Block, which transferred to Hampstead Theatre
- Fringe Report Award winner Sandman
- Ben Moor's Coelocanth and Dan Tetsell's Sins of The Grandfathers, both of which were made into Radio 4 plays.
- Lizzie Roper's Peccadillo Circus, which transferred to Trafalagar Studios.
- Nightmare Abbey by Eleanor Zeal, winner of an Edinburgh Fringe First and Scottish Daily Express Newcomer of the Year
- The Wild Party by Joseph Moncure March
- Porcelain by Chay Yew - Best New Play and Best Playwright 1993 Fringe Awards the show successfully transferred to the Royal Court
- My Life in Art by Andrew Cowie
- Her Alabaster Skin by Nick Green and A Doll's House by Henrik Ibsen both of which became part of BAC's I Wish I'd Seen That season
- Dutchman by Leroi Jones, directed by Amelia Nicholson, starring Nicholas Pinnock & Sharon Swyer
