= Chotto Ookii Theatre Company =

Chotto Ookii Theatre Company are a physical theatre company based in Leeds, England. It comprises performer/directors Matt Rogers, Kathleen Yore, Rebecca Devitt, Jake England-Johns and Rebekah Caputo. After forming as a collective in 2005 they produced their debut show And Even My Goldfish for which they won the Total Theatre Award for best newcomer at the 2006 Edinburgh Festival Fringe. The name means 'a little big' in Japanese.

Their work includes clowning, dance, extreme characterisation and simple magic, and their performances are built upon principles of unpredictability and contrast. Events on stage which would not naturally fit together in the most logical sense, by cumulative effect, communicate a distinct mood and message.

The absence of dialogue is very apparent. Whilst this is not unusual in related forms such as mime or contemporary dance (from which the company has drawn influence), their performances differ by including a large variety of non-verbal vocal sounds.

It was recently published in Total Theatre magazine that Chotto Ookii were working on a second full-scale theatre production. Little is currently known about this second production other than the title THUS FAR and no further and that it will premiere at an unspecified venue in autumn 2007.

"And Even My Goldfish" was adapted for screen in 2007 by film company Bad Bonobo (formerly Trespass Productions).
