= St Thomas, Brightside =

Former church in Sheffield, England

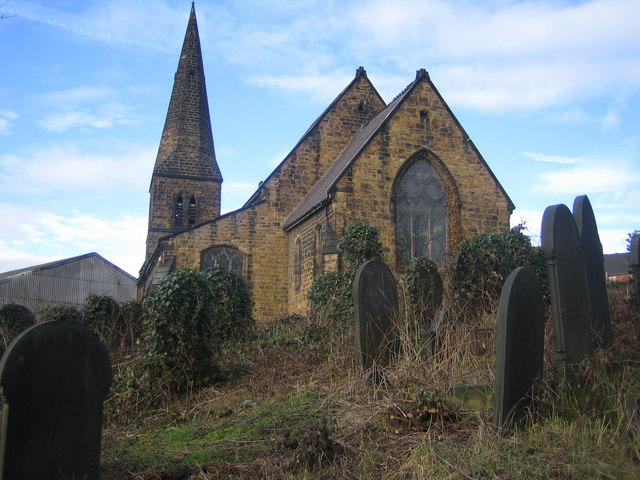
- St Thomas, seen from the north west

- Location within Sheffield

Religion
- Affiliation: Anglican
- District: Diocese of Sheffield
- Ecclesiastical or organizational status: Church
- Year consecrated: 1854

Location
- Location: Brightside, Sheffield; South Yorkshire, England
- Interactive map of St Thomas, Brightside
- Coordinates: 53°24′24″N 1°25′56″W

Architecture
- Architect: Flockton & Son
- Type: Church
- Style: Gothic Revival
- Completed: 1853
- Construction cost: £1600 (£150,000 in 2025)
- Capacity: 400

St Thomas is a former Anglican church in the Brightside area of Sheffield in England which now serves as a circus training school.

The Sheffield and Rotherham Railway opened in 1838, and both industry and housing spread along its route through the Lower Don Valley. Despite its booming population, the district of Brightside did not have an Anglican church, the local congregation instead meeting in a licensed room with a capacity of only seventy people. However, the district had two large Methodist chapels, and the Church Commissioners supported the construction of an Anglican church with a grant of £100. The total cost of construction was £1600, with the remainder being raised by subscription.

A site of around one acre off Holywell Road was donated by the Earl Fitzwilliam, and construction began in 1852, Canon Blackburn laying the foundations stone. It was completed the following year, with consecration by the Archbishop of York, Thomas Musgrave, taking place in 1854. It was designed by Flockton & Son, local architects who had already designed many buildings in Sheffield, including Christ Church, Pitsmoor, and the Anglican Chapel at the Sheffield General Cemetery. In the Gothic Revival style, it has a nave and single south aisle, with a tower and spire at the south-western corner.

Initially, the church remained part of the parish of Grimesthorpe, but in 1864, it was given its own parish. In 1873, a memorial was erected to William Mannifield, who had been killed in an accident at the nearby Brightside Colliery.

George Pace conducted much work on the church, providing new decorations in 1957, then a new altar, reredos and lectern in the 1960s. It was Grade II listed in 1973, but was closed and deconsecrated in 1979. During the 1980s, it was used as the Sheffield School of Gymnastics, then in 1995 it was restored as part of the TV series Challenge Anneka, to serve as a training centre for Greentop Circus.

== See also ==
- Listed buildings in Sheffield
- List of Commissioners' churches in Yorkshire
