= Gecko (theatre company) =

British international touring physical theatre company

Gecko is a British based international touring physical theatre company which has won multiple awards in the past. Founded in 2001 and led by Artistic Director Amit Lahav.

== Overview ==
The style is often referred to as 'Total Theatre', which Lahav describes as utilising any means possible to tell a story, including the creative deployment of puppets, props, physicality, language, music, lighting, multimedia and soundscapes to construct a complete theatrical world from these individual components. Through the ensemble's collaboration and the audience's engagement, each show continually evolves throughout their numerous stages of development.

Gecko is supported by its patrons, Arlene Phillips and Dominic West.

== Past productions ==
=== Taylor's Dummies (2002-2005) ===
Taylor's Dummies was voted best performance off-West End by Time Out Live Awards. The production also won Time Out's Critics Choice of The Year 2002, The Guardian's Pick of The Fringe 2002, and Special Award; Mess Festival Sarajevo 2004. The production has toured the United Kingdom, with venues including The Tobacco Factory Bristol, and Battersea Arts Centre London, in addition to international venues. The 50 minute show follows the titular character after he meets a woman in a Cafe or bar, exploring his fears, memories, and desires. The production was met with positive reviews. The productions creative team included Technical Director Stuart Heyes, Composer David Price, Original Lighting Design by Ian Scott, and Original Design by Ruth Finn and the company.

=== The Race (2005-2007) ===
The Race won a Total Theatre Award, 2005. The production performed at the Edinburgh Fringe Festival, and has toured nationally and internationally, including a four-week run at the Brits Off Broadway Festival, New York City. The hour long show follows a man as he anxiously waits nine months for the birth of his child, the performance is underscored by recorded music, including Creedence Clearwater Revival's Proud Mary to jazz and klezmer songs. The productions creative team included Production manager Stuart Heyes, costumes by Ellan Parry, and lighting by Kristina Hjelm.

=== The Arab and The Jew (2007-2008) ===
The Arab and The Jew toured extensively throughout the UK and internationally, visiting venues including Edinburgh Festival, The Junction Cambridge, Lyric Hammersmith London, and Ruhrfestspiele, Recklinghausen Germany. The production explores the Arab-Israeli Conflict, and was met with positive reviews. The productions creative team included, Creation and devising by Amit Lahav and Al Nedjari, Lighting Design by Jackie Shemesh, Production Manager Stuart Heyes, Technical Managers Rachel Bowen, Jeremy Walker and Billy Wolf, Relighting by Rachel Bowen, and Rigger Joe White.

=== The Overcoat (2009-2011) ===
Adapted from Nikolai Gogol's short story, The Overcoat is a co-production between the Lyric Hammersmith in association with Theatre Royal Plymouth. Gecko's 80 minute production rejects traditional plot structures, instead focusing on the movement and visuals. The production received mixed reviews, with praise for James Farncombe's lighting design.

=== Missing (2011-2019) ===
Missing was first performed in 2012 and is still touring worldwide, including performances in Macau, Hong Kong, Forest Festival Thessaloniki, and Teatro Principal Valencia. On 13 March 2015, during the productions run at Battersea Arts Centre, a fire destroyed the venue, and the shows set, props, lighting, and costumes. This ended the shows run at Battersea Arts Centre. On 20 March 2015 the company ran a free open dress rehearsal, and a bare bones version of the show at Southbank Centre's Queen Elizabeth Hall. Audiences to this one-off performance were asked to bring items that can be used as props, allowing them feel part of the performance process. After raising over £11000 through a Kickstarter campaign, the show was able to go ahead with its tour in Mexico. The show received the National Stage Management Awards’ ‘Stage Management Team of the Year’ in 2015 for their response to the fire. In September 2018 the production returned to Battersea Arts Centre to finish the run.

Missing has a simple main theme, exploring the life of an ordinary woman named Lily. The production has received praise. The productions creative team includes Design by Rhys Jarman and Amit Lahav, Lighting Design by Chris Swain and Amit Lahav, Original Music by Dave Price, Associate Director Rich Rusk, Sound Design by Enzo Appetecchia, and Costume Supervisors: Amy Cook (original production) / Martin Goddard (2015 rebuild) / Becky-Dee Trevenen (2018).

=== The Time of Your Life (2015) ===
The Time of Your Life is a live 30 minute performance by Gecko created specially for BBC's Live From Television Centre. It was broadcast on 15 November 2015. The production tells the story of one mans life, from birth to death. The show received positive reviews. The creative team on The Time of Your Life included set and costume design by Rhys Jarman, Costume design by Martin Goddard, hair and make up by Jane Cole, stage lighting by Chris Swain, music by Dave Price, and Associate Directors Helen Baggett and Rich Rusk.

=== Institute (2014-Present) ===
Institute first opened at Northern Stage in Newcastle upon Tyne in 2014 and has toured the United Kingdom and internationally, including performances being held at the 2015 Edinburgh Festival, the Nuffield Theatre in Southampton, Lermontov Russian Drama Theatre in Kazakhstan, and Jing-an Modern Drama Valley Festival in Shanghai. The production is performed by four male cast members, whilst the narrative explores the modern struggles of office life and mental health. Gecko collaborated with mental health charity Suffolk Mind on their 'Wellcome Project' to bring mental wellbeing resources and to their audiences across the UK. This initiative had four strands, including post-show discussions with mental health experts, providing a programme including mental wellbeing resources, having mental health workers in the theatres foyer to answer questions, and running free workshops. Institute received five star reviews, including praise for the music by Dave Price and lighting design by Chris Swain.

=== The Wedding (2017-Present) ===
Gecko’s newest show previewed at Northern Stage, Newcastle upon Tyne, in 2017 before going on to tour both nationally and internationally. The production has toured to venues including Lighthouse in Poole, UK, MODAFE (International Modern Dance Festival) in Seoul, South Korea, and Stadsschouwburg, Utrecht, Netherlands. The 80 minute show explores themes surrounding the complexities of human nature, and human relationships. Creator Amit Lahav states that he wants each audience member to leave with their own interpretations, saying "If everyone came out of the theatre and had the exact same interpretation I would have failed. I would have nailed it down too heavily". The production gained positive reviews, receiving praise for the score by Dave Price and sound design by Jonathon Everett. The productions design by Rhys Jarman was displayed at the V&A's Staging Places exhibition in July 2019 to January 2020.

In 2021 the National Theatre commissioned a production with Gecko to explore the themes of family, home, migration and racism. The show was then expected to première in 2022 and be performed on the South Bank in 2023.
