= The Palestinian Circus =

The Palestinian Circus is a non-profit touring circus and school that combines traditional Palestinian culture with contemporary circus acts. it has a stated mission of using circus performances and training to connect and elevate Palestinian communities.

== History ==
The Palestinian Circus School was originally founded in 2006 after the Second Intifada as a creative outlet for young Palestinians by Shadi Zmorrod and Jessika Devlieghere.

The group’s first production took placed in Ramallah and was called Circus Behind the Wall. It included an act of juggling over the wall in protest of the wall that the Israeli government had built.

Over time, the group began touring.

== Leadership ==
The Palestinian Circus School was led by Zmorrod and Devlieghere. The current director of the Palestinian Circus is Mohamad Rabah.
