= The Camden Head =

Pub in London, England

The Camden Head, London
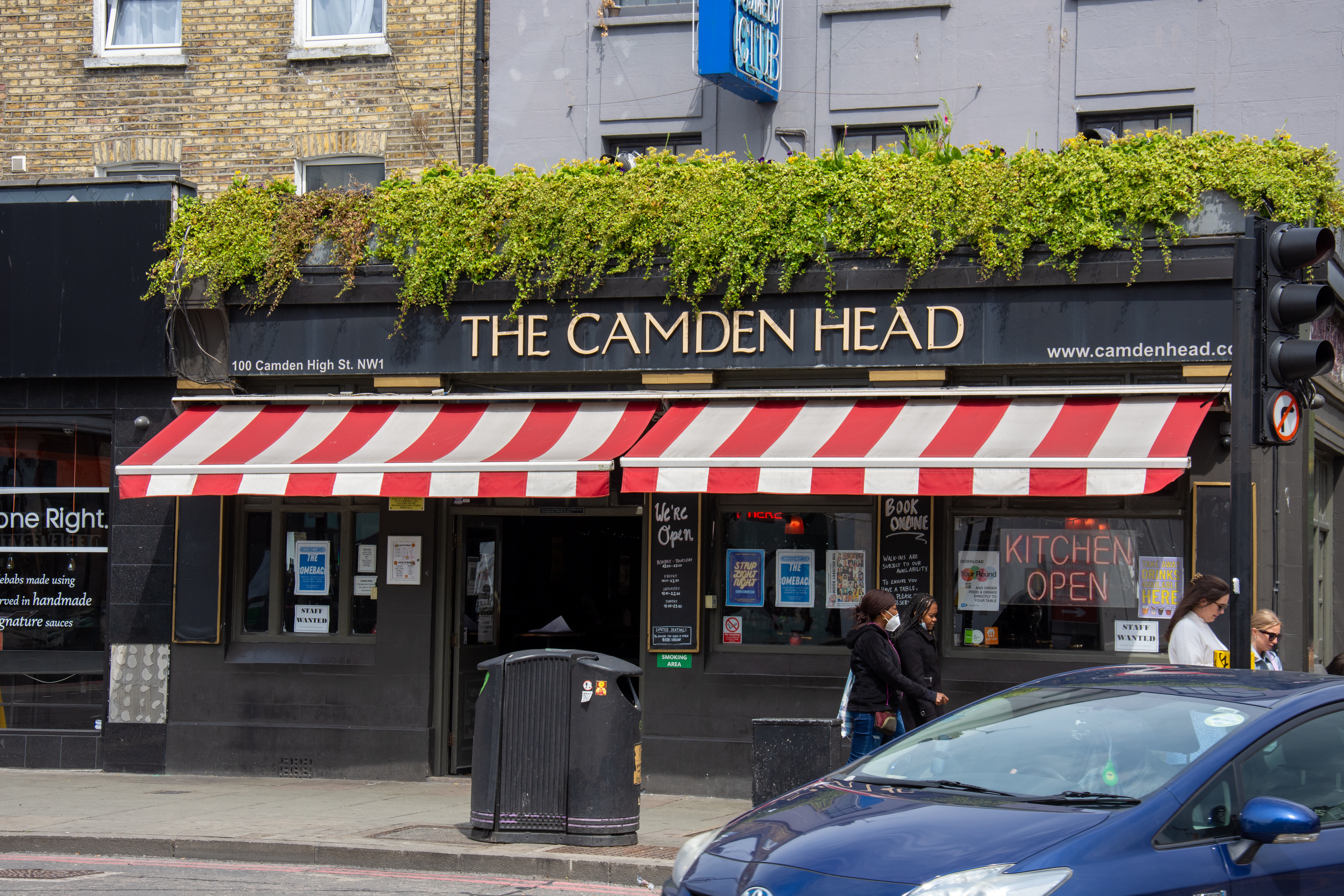
- Camden Head from the front
- Interactive map of The Camden Head, London
- Address: Camden High Street; London, N1; United Kingdom
- Coordinates: 51.53730°N 0.14112°W
- Owner: Camden Bars
- Capacity: 300 standing, 60 seated
- Public transit: Camden Town

Construction
- Built: 1787; 239 years ago
- Renovated: 2004/05

Website
- camdenhead.com

The Camden Head is one of the oldest pubs in Camden, London, England having been established in 1787. It is also a former music venue and hosts comedy events.

== History ==
The Camden Head on Camden High Street is a public house and live venue which first opened towards the end of the 19th century, and has undergone several name changes: it was briefly known as "Liberties" for a period of a few years, before changing back to its former name, Camden Head, which is listed as a registered public house as far back as 1869 - run by then-publican George Soole.

Photos of The Camden Head on the High Street, taken nearly 110 years apart

Camden Head in 1903

Camden Head in 2012

Nowadays, it is known for its local pub atmosphere and comedy venue, which has seen comedians such as Alan Carr, Stephen Merchant, and Bob Mortimer perform. It is not to be confused with The Camden Head in Islington, which is situated on Camden Passage.

== Architecture ==
The Camden Head's architecture has changed little since its establishment in the 19th century, and testament to that exists in the form of a photo, dated 1903, which shows the building's appearance and similarity to that of the modern-day building. A copy of this photo can be found hanging in The Camden Head pub itself, and is archived at the Camden Local Studies and Archives Centre Catalogue

== Notable events ==
The Camden Head was an official venue of the yearly festival Camden Crawl. It is a regular venue in the annual Camden Fringe where, in 2011, Richard Tyrone Jones performed.

Synthpop band Ou Est Le Swimming Pool, originally from Camden, shot their video for Dance The Way I Feel upstairs in the Camden Head.

== Camden Comedy Club ==
In September 2014, the pub relaunched its upstairs venue as Camden Comedy Club.
