= Le Patin Libre =

Le Patin Libre is a performance art company creating and touring performances on ice skates, utilizing ice and glide as means for self-expression. Founded in 2005 by figure skater Alexandre Hamel in Montreal, Quebec, Canada, the group created what is regarded as a new genre of performing art, called 'contemporary skating'.

Organized as an artistic collective, Le Patin Libre is currently composed of five dedicated members: Samory Ba, Jasmin Boivin, Taylor Dilley, Alexandre Hamel, Pascale Jodoin.

Apart from performing, the group is also politically involved in an effort to re-organize public skating sessions and improve general access to and freedom of motion on public ice surfaces in Montreal, QC, CA.

Early in the company's development, media described Le Patin Libre as "Disney on Ice with a bonus hint of imagination, artistic expression and technical mastery". The initial growth of the troupe was linked to winter festivals, which are a tradition in the province of Quebec. Exploring skating outside, the troupe was inspired by Montreal's contemporary dance and circus scene.

More recently Le Patin Libre has been 'playing with choreography and imagery that rinses viewers of all conventional expectations.'

== Contemporary skating ==
Contemporary skating is a genre of performance art created by Le Patin Libre. The concept was conceived by Alexandre Hamel in 2005. Since that time, the concept has evolved, and the genre has emerged, as evidenced by critics approval of the collectives latest material, and the interest of traditional contemporary dance organizations such as Sadler's Wells, Dance Umbrella Festival and the National Arts Centre.

Contemporary skating differs from other on-ice performance activities including figure skating. The concept of contemporary skating was inspired by contemporary dance and circus. Artists in Le Patin Libre claim that; as simple as it may seem, glide is a profound way of movement particular to skating which merits exploration.

=== Tap-skating ===
A style of on ice movement invented by the troop, utilizing tap dance and skating. The artists use the sounds of their blades to create music.

=== Freestyle/Extreme Ice Skating ===
Performers within Le Patin Libre have experimented with freestyle skating; a concept developed by teenagers in France to play with and explore on ice movement.

== History and achievements ==
- 2005 : Le Patin Libre was founded by Alexandre Hamel.
- 2006 : Presented its first show in Saint-Jean-sur-Richelieu, a suburb of Montreal, Quebec, Canada. First tour, which took place through Quebec.
- 2007 : Explored creating various shows and events, including parties and an ice show adapted from the tale The Pied Piper of Hamelin.
- 2008 : First tour in England, UK.
- 2009 : Performed during the official opening of the Richmond Olympic Oval.
- 2010 : French tour with guest skaters.
- 2011 : Continued to tour productions in France.
- 2012 : First show in London, UK.
- 2013 : First performances in Berlin, Germany. Sadlers Wells Jerwood Studio residence with dramaturg Ruth Little.
- 2014 : First performances for Dance Umbrella Festival, London, UK. First performances during the Edinburgh Fringe Festival.
- 2015 : First performances for National Arts Centre. Winner of the inaugural The Place Total Theatre Award for Dance in Edinburgh, Scotland. Nominated for Best Modern Choreography Critics’ Circle National Dance Award.
- 2016 : Performed at Somerset House, co-presented by Dance Umbrella and Somerset House.
