= Gandini Juggling =

British contemporary circus company

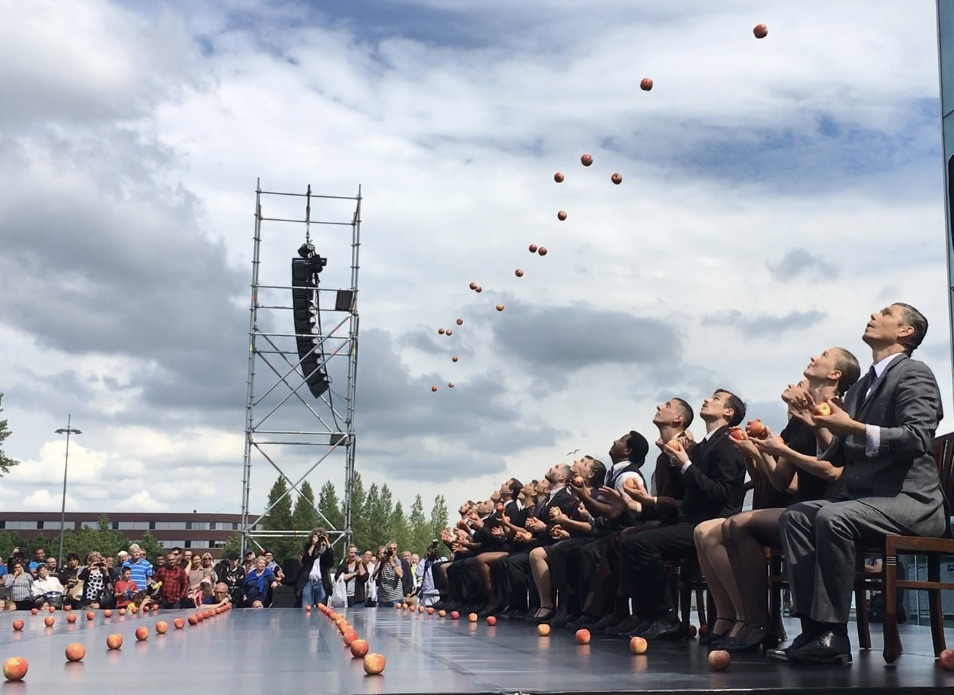
A live, outdoor version of Smashed XL in 2016. The company co-founders, Sean Gandini and Kati Ylä-Hokkala, are nearest camera.

Gandini Juggling is a London-based contemporary circus company. Originally called Gandini Juggling Project, the company was founded in 1991 by Sean Gandini and Kati Ylä-Hokkala. Their initial works focused on fusing juggling with principles from postmodern dance, and were created in close collaboration with choreographer Gill Clarke. Gandini Juggling were early-adopters of siteswap notation, guided by their collaborations with Mike Day, who performed in their first two works.

In later years Gandini Juggling have explored juggling's relationship to art forms other than postmodern dance, and to date they have created over 30 stage and outdoor performances ranging from "radical art/juggling fusions to accessible theatrical performances, from choreographic studies to commercially commissioned routines."

== History ==
Sean Gandini and Kati Ylä-Hokkala met while Gandini was performing one of his street shows in London's Covent Garden. Ylä-Hokkala, a former Finnish national champion in rhythmic gymnastics was "looking for a way to use her skills outside of the rigidly competitive system" of her sport. Prior to forming Gandini Juggling, both Gandini and Ylä-Hokkala worked for British-based new circus company Ra-Ra Zoo.

=== 1991–1999 ===
From 1991-1999 Gandini Juggling worked closely with British choreographer Gill Clarke (1954-2011). During this time they made a number of performances that merged principles of postmodern dance with juggling. Critic Mary Brennan noted of the company's first show 'nEither Either botH and...' that it was "tuned into the deepest values of postmodern dance even as it sets out to celebrate some of our oldest entertainment skills" and that, the "... group suddenly confront us with the whole dance essence of what it is to-have objects/bodies moving in space, forming relationships with that space, with other bodies."

Regular performers in this period included Mike Day (co-founder of siteswap notation), Lindsey Butcher (founder of aerial dance company Gravity & Levity), Alix Wilding (co-founder of Feeding the Fish), and Ben Richter.

During this period Gandini Juggling also regularly presented their experiments in dance juggling at Juggling Conventions, such as the European Juggling Convention.

=== 2000–2008 ===
In 2000 Gandini Juggling were commissioned to make a show for the Millennium Dome on London's Greenwich peninsula, as part of London's Millennium celebrations. At the same time they also built a large glass cube and, with musician and juggler John Blanchard, begun to explore bounce juggling. In 2004 they collaborated with John Blanchard and circus director John-Paul Zaccarini to make No Exit under the company name of K-DNK, supported by a Jerwood Award and London's National Centre for Circus Arts.

In 2004 Gandini Juggling first appeared as part of the London International Mime Festival, presenting a double bill: Duet and Quartet. Duet was Gandini Juggling's first narrative performance, exploring the relationship between a man and a woman. Quartet was a more formal choreography of juggling patterns.

Gandini Juggling's "fun and frothy" Sweet Life was first performed in 2006. It was partly inspired by Federico Fellini's film La Dolce Vita, and it toured European city squares and other outdoor spaces for several years.

Gandini Juggling returned to the London International Mime Festival in 2008 with Downfall. This performance was said to be an exploration of light and dark, and it contained a number of glow juggling sequences. It also featured further experiments with the rhythmical sounds of bounce juggling.

=== 2009–2015 ===
Between 2009 and 2012, Gandini Juggling were commissioned by England's National Theatre to make a series of performances for the venue's Watch This Space summer festival of street and outdoor performance. The first of these performances was Nightclubs in 2009, a large-scale show that was "an abstract and technically complex ensemble show which collected a group of markedly different performers and joined them by their unabashed love of spreadsheet juggling and mathematics." This was followed in 2010 by Smashed, a Pina Bausch-inspired work "exploring conflict, lost love and quaint afternoon tea". The original 30-minute outdoor version of Smashed was later reworked into a 60-minute indoor version for the London International Mime Festival. Smashed went on to become the company's most successful work being performed over 500 times between 2010 and 2017. For 2011's Watch This Space the company presented Blotched, and then in 2012 Twenty/Twenty, a celebration of the company's 20th year.

In 2014 Gandini Juggling premiered CLOWNS & QUEENS at London's Shoreditch Town Hall, a show that was "full of sex, but it is never sexy, examining the nature of lust with an almost forensic attention..."

For the London International Mime Festival in 2015 Gandini Juggling premiered 4 x 4 (Ephemeral Architectures), a fusion of juggling and ballet, at the Royal Opera House in London's Covent Garden. 4 x 4 (Ephemeral Architectures) was directed by Sean Gandini and choreographed by Ludovic Ondiviela to the original composition Suspended Opus 69 by Nimrod Borenstein.

=== 2015-present ===
Following the touring success of both Smashed and 4x4, the company began work on what they saw as their triptych of juggling and dance: ballet (4x4), Bharatanatyam (Sigma, choreographed by Seeta Patel, 2018) and contemporary dance (Spring, choreographed by Alexander Whitley, 2018). All three of these productions were performed in London theatres that traditionally showed internationally renown dance: Royal Opera House (4x4) and Sadler’s Wells.

Other productions include: 8 Songs (2015), Meta (2015), StackcatS (2018), Smashed 2 (2021), the latter a follow up to Smashed, this time with seven women and two men.

LIFE: A Love Letter to Merce Cunningham (2022), a collaboration with the Merce Cunningham Foundation, was an exploration of the late choreographer’s work with Gandini’s flair for skill, text and unison resulting in “A jaw-droppingly complex blend of dance and juggling”. The show was roundly praised and featured a specially commissioned score by Caroline Shaw, who performed live with the company at the piece’s premiere at Sadler’s Wells in 2022.

In 2023 the company’s co-directors Sean Gandini and Kati Ylä-Hokkala created their first duet in nearly thirty years entitled The Games We Play. It features several lectures on siteswap, rhythmic juggling on a table and excerpts from past duets; interwoven with various stories from the world of circus including passages on: Lola the Pig, Antonio Tremani and The Oklahoma Tunnel Shuffle. The piece premiered at The Place as part of the London International Mime Festival.

== Works ==
| Year Premiered | Title |
|---|---|
| 1992 | nEither Either botH and... |
| 1994 | Caught Still / Hanging |
| 1995 | ... and other curiOus questions |
| 1996 | Septet |
| 1998 | Septet/2 |
| 1999 | Remembering Rastelli |
| 2000 | Big |
| 2000 | Cube |
| 2000 | Dome |
| 2002 | Don't Break My Balls |
| 2002 | Vivaldi Light Balls |
| 2002 | Quartet |
| 2002 | Racketeers |
| 2004 | No Exit |
| 2006 | Mozart Glow Clubs |
| 2008 | Downfall |
| 2009 | Night Clubs |
| 2010 | Smashed (outdoor) |
| 2011 | Blotched |
| 2011 | Motet (with Circo Aereo) |
| 2012 | Chinoiseries |
| 2012 | Twenty/Twenty |
| 2013 | CLOWNS & QUEENS |
| 2013 | Three Notes for Three Jugglers (composed by Tom Johnson) |
| 2014 | 4 x 4 (Ephemeral Architectures) |
| 2015 | 8 Songs |
| 2015 | Meta |

=== Other collaborations ===
In 2011 with Circo Aereo, Gandini Juggling co-produced; Motet. This was directed by Circo Aereo's Maksim Komaro and was themed as a "history of juggling".

In 2016, Sean Gandini was asked to choreograph and perform in the skills ensemble for the English National Opera's production of Philip Glass's Akhnaten. Joined by nine Gandini Jugglers the piece premiered at the London Coliseum in March 2016 and transferred to the LA Opera House in November 2016. With further runs at ENO (2018, 2023) and a run at the New York's Metropolitan Opera (2019, 2022).

In 2016 Gandini Juggling also worked with juggling company Plastic Boom to produce Water on Mars for the Edinburgh Fringe.
