= Ridiculusmus =

British theatre company

- Formation: 1992
- Type: Theatre group
- Purpose: Dadaist
- Location: United Kingdom
- Artistic director(s): Jon Haynes and David Woods
- Website: ridiculusmus.com

Ridiculusmus is a British theatre company founded in 1992 by Angus Barr, Jon Haynes and David Woods, who became co-directors in 1996.

Their first few productions were adaptations of novels. Since 1997 Haynes and Woods have devised and written all but one of Ridiculusmus' plays. Some of these have been published by Oberon Books and commissioned by the Barbican, London.

== History ==
The founding members met as students at London's Poor School and began busking on the London Underground and doing comedy club open spots. They called themselves Mel, Pat & Harm, and performed comic songs from the 1920s and 1930s to the accompaniment of Barr's ukulele. They also opened a Dadaist comedy club called The Tomato Club.

On graduating from The Poor School, Ridiculusmus filled a cancelled slot at London's Canal Cafe Theatre with a hastily produced adaptation of Jerome K. Jerome's Three Men in a Boat. It played to mixed reviews and the troupe produced more adaptations; their next production was a promenade version of Flann O'Brien's novel The Third Policeman. Poor School graduates Kevin Henshall and Lucy Cuthbertson joined the company and Ridiculusmus was in residence at The Playhouse in Derry, Northern Ireland. Woods and Haynes then adapted another O'Brien novel, At Swim-Two-Birds.

== Funding ==
The group, who had been project grant recipients, were up until the end of March 2015 a National portfolio organisation of the Arts Council of England.
