= National Centre for Circus Arts =

British circus school

The National Centre for Circus Arts (formerly the Circus Space) is a professional circus school in the Hoxton area in London that offers one of the UK's only university degree programmes in circus. It is a leading centre for contemporary circus training. It supports the professional development of circus performers and circus companies and runs youth and adult evening classes every week. It also runs the London Youth Circus.

== History ==
It was established in 1989 by Jonathan Graham with a number of other volunteers, including artistes/composers in residence, Lights In A Fat City with Artist in Residence Sheila Stewart, in a former timber yard in North Road London .Together they collaborated in developing and performing " Satellites 1 and 2 ".(now the site of the Pleasance Theatre). From the outset it has provided support for professional performers through practice time, devising space, company support and putting on shows, including the Circus Space Cabaret, plus an adult evening programme and a youth programme.

In 1994 it moved to Shoreditch Electric Light Station, a former power station, in Hoxton, starting a BTEC "National Diploma in Performing Arts (Circus)" in 1995 which ran to 1999. In 1998 it designed and delivered the tailor-made training programme for the 87 aerial artists who performed in the Millennium Show at the Millennium Dome. In 1999 it started to run a BA (Hons) two-year intensive course in "Theatre Practice – Contemporary Circus" in association with the Central School of Speech and Drama. The Foundation and Ba(Hons) degrees are now validated by the University of Kent (see below). Until 2014, it was the only place you could achieve a degree in circus arts in the UK. However, in September 2014, Circomedia in Bristol launched a BA (Hons) in Contemporary Circus and Physical Performance, accredited by Bath Spa University.

The Circus Space was instrumental in the creation and development of The Generating Company.

In 2012 Circus Space – now the National Centre for Circus Arts – ran an eight-week intensive training programme for 42 deaf and disabled artists, preparing them to perform featured roles in the Opening Ceremony of the Paralympic Games at the Olympic Stadium in Stratford on 29 August 2012. Some of those artists who prepared for the spectacular high-wire act in the Paralympics Opening Ceremony at the Olympics 2012 included injured soldiers.

In March 2014, Circus Space was awarded national status and renamed the National Centre for Circus Arts. This was recognised as a major step in developing a culture of homegrown circus in the UK. Rufus Norris, now Artistic Director of the National Theatre, said in 2014:

"One of the challenges in this country has been that a lot of the circus arts have been abroad – Europe, Canada, America, China, Russia. But we haven't really had a developed centre here – and now we do. That's fantastic in terms of what that promises in all kinds of ways."

Former Joint Chief-Executive, Jane Rice-Bowen, said at the time:

"For a long time we haven't had the legitimacy of other art forms like ballet or opera and this is our moment to say circus is a brilliant art form."

== Degree programme ==
The National Centre for Circus Arts accepts around 20–30 new students each year onto its two-year Foundation Degree in "Circus Arts" course. No academic requirements need to be met and admission is based purely on suitability and successful audition. Students undertake a training regime of 36 weeks per year. Upon finishing the course, students may then audition for a place on a final one-year course to achieve a BA (Hons) degree. Some students also go on to achieve a Postgraduate Certificate. The school's degrees are validated by the University of Kent.

It also offers a BTEC Level 3 Diploma in Performing Arts – Circus Arts course in partnership with Hackney College. The Diploma in Performing Arts is run by Hackney Community College. It is a one-year, full-time course which gives insight into circus and the wider performing arts sector.

NCCA was previously a member of the Conservatoire for Dance and Drama, until the dissolution of CDD in 2022. The National Centre for Circus Arts is also member of the European Federation of Professional Circus Schools (FEDEC).

== National partnerships ==
The National Centre for Circus Arts plays a role in a number of national partnership initiatives. The Circus Training Action Group, or CTAG, is a partnership of four UK Circus Schools (The Circus Space, Circomedia, Greentop Circus and Skylight) developing quality standards and the qualifications for circus skills in the UK.

The National Youth Circus Event, initiated in 2008 as part of the Young Peoples' Participatory Theatre project, was led by the National Centre (then The Circus Space) with partners including Albert and Friends Instant Circus and was hosted in 2009 by The Circus Space in London, in 2010 by Blackpool Youth Circus, and in 2011 by Greentop Circus and Swamp Circus Trust in Sheffield. Since 2011, the National Youth Circus Event has been hosted by the National Centre.

In 2013, the National Centre partnered with Gandini Juggling on their show 4 × 4 Ephemeral Architectures. The Gandinis embarked into new territory – pairing four ballet dancers with four jugglers – as part of a new commission by ROH Studio. As Sophie Rose, general manager of Gandinis explained: "For the last decade, Gandini Juggling have often had a guest dancer; a solitary figure, a magician illuminating patterns, framing and wandering amongst traces. This piece will revisit the company's frequent obsessions with grids/patterns and mathematics and will be informed with a hovering new found theatricality."

The National Centre for Circus Arts is a member of the Creative Industries Federation.

In 2016, the National Centre was awarded an "outstanding" two star Creative Industry Green certification for its commitment to reducing its environmental impact by Julie's Bicycle.

== Alumni ==
National Centre alumni include stars of Cirque du Soleil, the Royal Shakespeare Company and actress Sadie Frost, who learnt flying trapeze. Theatre director Daniel Kramer, TOWIE star Lucy Mecklenburgh and director Stephen Daldry have all trained at the organisation. Graduate company Circulus includes successful model and gentleman juggler Tom Gaskin, and film maker Remy Archer. National Centre graduate company Barely Methodical Troupe (BMT), founded by Beren D'Amico, Charlie Wheeller and Louis Gift, achieved critical success for their debut show Bromance. Their experimental acrobatic circus company fuses Hand-to-Hand and Cyr Wheel with a through line of creative dynamic movement. Influenced by their already existing skill sets (Parkour, Bboying, and Tricking), they have a fresh perspective on the creation of circus. This combination of technical ability with their stylish flow is the defining feature of the troupe. They won the 2014 Total Theatre Award for circus. Their next show, Kin, headlined CircusFest 2016 at the Roundhouse.

== See also ==
- National Institute of Circus Arts (Australia)
- École nationale de cirque (France)
