= Camden Fringe =

London comedy festival

The Camden Fringe is an arts festival in London, taking place over four weeks in the summer as an alternative to the Edinburgh Fringe. The first Camden Fringe took place in 2006 at the Etcetera Theatre. In 2017, the Camden Fringe sold 30,000 tickets for 1000 performances across 25 venues.

Performances at the Camden Fringe include stand-up, revivals of classical plays, new writing and musical comedy.

== History ==
The Camden Fringe was set up by Zena Barrie and Michelle Flower for It's Alright For Some Ltd, who produced comedy at the Edinburgh Fringe Festival from 2002 to 2006 and ran the Etcetera Theatre in Camden from 2003 to 2009.

The first Camden Fringe took place in August 2006 at the Etcetera Theatre and included 57 performances by 22 acts over a 4-week period.

In 2007 Liberties (now known as The Camden Head or Camden Comedy Club) was added as a cabaret style venue and in 2008 the Camden People's Theatre joined in. There were 301 performances across the three venues over four weeks in 2008.

In 2009 The Roundhouse studio was added as the 4th and largest space. They staged 399 performances of 120 different shows and sold 10,600 tickets.

In 2021 the festival was hosted by sixteen venues: 2 Northdown, Aces and Eights, Camden Comedy Club, Camden People's Theatre, Canal Cafe Theatre, The Cockpit, Comedy Cabin, Etcetera Theatre, Hen and Chickens, The Hope Theatre, The Lion and Unicorn Theatre, The London Irish Centre, Museum of Comedy, Theatre Deli, Broadgate, Upstairs at the Gatehouse, The Water Rats.

In 2025 there are set to be over 400 different events taking place across North London

== See also ==
- London Festival Fringe
- Edinburgh Festival
- Camden Head
- The Greater Manchester Fringe
