= Adrian Howells =

British performance artist (1962–2014)

- Born: 9 April 1962; Bapchild, Kent, United Kingdom
- Died: 16 March 2014 (aged 51); Glasgow, Scotland, United Kingdom
- Known for: Performance art, experimental theatre, one-to-one performance
- Notable work: Adrienne's Dirty Laundry Experience (2004), An Audience with Adrienne (2006-10), Foot Washing for the Sole (2008), The Pleasure of Being: Washing/Feeding/Holding (2010)

Adrian Howells (9 April 1962 – 16 March 2014) was a British performance artist associated with one-to-one performance and intimate theatre. He performed in the United Kingdom and internationally (including in Israel, Singapore, Canada, Japan, Germany, Italy, and other countries). He was a pioneer of one-to-one performance, in which an artist repeats and adapts a score for a performance for a single audience member, or audience-participant, and repeats the action serially across a run of several days. The process and outcomes in Howells' signature works were frequently modelled on activities associated with the service industries or the tertiary sector of the economy, such as washing the audience-participant's hair or clothes, or giving an audience-member a bath, replicating in some ways the labour of a hairdresser, laundry worker, or caregiver; or he appropriated and adapted intimate interpersonal experiences in carefully mediated situations, like talking around a script or score in a setting such as a Japanese rock garden in The Garden of Adrian (2009), or holding hands, listening to music, and spooning in silence in Held (2008).

== Life and work ==
Howells was born in 1962 in his grandmother's house in Bapchild, Kent in the South of England. He was raised in nearby Sittingbourne, and attended Minterne County Junior School and Borden Grammar School. In the 1970s, he participated in youth theatre companies including Kent County Youth Theatre and Sittingbourne Youth Theatre. From 1981 to 1984 he attended Bretton Hall College in West Yorkshire, graduating with a bachelor's degree in Drama and English. After working as a jobbing actor and director in provincial productions of plays and pantomimes, in 1990 Howells joined the Citizens Theatre Company in Glasgow, Scotland as an assistant director to Giles Havergal (one of the company's three pioneering directors, alongside Philip Prowse and the late Robert David MacDonald). While working at the Citizens Theatre, Howells met Stewart Laing, and Laing cast Howells alongside the drag performers Leigh Bowery and Ivan Cartwright in a production of Copi's scatological play The Homosexual or the Difficulty of Sexpressing Oneself (1971) -- Laing's first directorial production (co-directed with Gerrard McArthur). The play toured to Glasgow, London and Manchester in 1993–94.

From 2001 until around 2008, much of Howells’ work involved the use of a drag persona, namely Adrienne. Adrienne was used as a persona in a broad range of performances, including one-to-ones where Howells: washed and dried a punter's clothing over the course of an hour (Adrienne's Dirty Laundry Experience, 2003); washed and styled one's hair in a hairdressers (Salon Adrienne, 2005); helped audience-participants buy a new outfit (Adrienne's Personal Shopping Experience, 2005); delivered wine, dessert and conversation to an occupied hotel room (Adrienne's Room Service, 2005); served food in a bar (Adrienne's Bar and Grill, 2010); and – in the most arduous of these performances – Adrian/Adrienne lived for a week in a hotel room, without shaving, washing, or removing her make-up, receiving guests as the debris of eating and living mounted in the room (Adrienne: The Great Depression, 2004). In a review, Howells described his investment in intimate participatory performance: 'I went into one-on-one work because I wanted an equal exchange between performer and audience. I wanted to really connect with an individual and make it something cherish-able and genuine. And there are moments when you puncture the performance and it is something real.’

Later, Howells recalls, ‘I made a conscientious decision to dispense with the mask of Adrienne – the makeup, hair, and costume. I wanted to be much more open and honest about risk, and vulnerability – and the cost, I guess, of an engagement with another person'. This work has been widely discussed in terms of the means by which Howells explored intimacy, the pleasures and difficulties of interpersonal communication, and social relations. After dropping the 'mask of Adrienne', Howells created one-to-one performances without a discernible persona. Key examples included The Garden of Adrian (2009); The Pleasure of Being: Washing/Feeding/Holding (2010), in which an audience-participant lay in a bath of water and oils and was washed by Howells, then—after leaving the bath—was fed chocolates and held while wrapped in a towel; and his most extensively toured of these performances, Foot Washing for the Sole (2008), a long encounter modelled on a foot massage.

In his final years, Howells returned to creating solo and ensemble productions with larger audiences. These included Lifeguard (2012), staged in a swimming pool in Glasgow with a professional dancer who performed in the water. May I Have the Pleasure...? used the format of a wedding reception to explore loneliness, sex and marriage. A reviewer wrote: 'The premise is a simple one: Howells has been best man on no fewer than eight occasions; he is something of a wedding expert, and yet he has never been in a long-term relationship. This new piece meditates on the feelings of isolation which such a situation can create.'

Howells struggled with chronic depression throughout his adult life. He frequently discussed depression in his performances (for example, in Adrienne: The Great Depression), and in interviews. He died by suicide on the weekend of 16–17 March 2014 in his home in Glasgow, Scotland.

Howells' final project, Dancer was performed posthumously by Ian Johnston and Gary Gardiner and reviewed by Lyn Gardner for The Guardian newspaper as a 'simple, generous-spirited [and] vulnerable' work full of 'joy and abandon'.

== Legacy ==
Howells' papers are held in the Scottish Theatre Collection at the University of Glasgow, where they are open to researchers and the public. Materials from the archive are reproduced in a book on Howells' work: It's All Allowed: The Performances of Adrian Howells, edited by Deirdre Heddon and Dominic Johnson, which was published in 2016 to coincide with the second anniversary of Howells' death.

In 2017, an annual award was set up in Howells' name. The Adrian Howells Award for Intimate Performance provides £4,000 to an artist working in intimate and/or one-to-one performance in the UK. It is led by the National Theatre of Scotland, Battersea Arts Centre and Take Me Somewhere Festival with support from the University of Glasgow and the Live Art Development Agency. Previous winners include Nic Green (2017), Rhiannon Armstrong (2018), and Zinzi Minott (2019/20).
