= London International Mime Festival =

London International Mime Festival (LIMF)
- Status: Ended
- Genre: Arts festival
- Dates: January (dates vary)
- Frequency: Annual
- Venue: Multiple across London
- Location: London
- Country: United Kingdom
- Founded: 1977; 49 years ago
- Founders: Nola Rae MBE; Joseph Seelig OBE
- Previous event: 16 January – 5 February 2023
- Area: International
- People: Helen Lannaghan; Joseph Seelig
- Sponsor: Arts Council England
- Website: mimelondon.com

The London International Mime Festival (LIMF) was an annual festival of contemporary visual theatre held in London between 1977 and 2023. Its programme included physical theatre, circus, puppetry, object theatre, clowning and live art, with an emphasis on performances that used movement and visual storytelling rather than spoken dialogue.

== History ==
The festival was founded in 1977 by mime performer Nola Rae and theatre producer Joseph Seelig at the Cockpit Theatre. Initially intended as a one-off event presenting British mime and physical theatre artists, it expanded to include international performers in 1978. Helen Lannaghan joined Seelig as co-director in 1987.

Over its history, LIMF presented performances at more than thirty London venues. These included the Almeida Theatre, Barbican Centre, Battersea Arts Centre, Institute of Contemporary Arts, Jacksons Lane, Royal Opera House, Sadler’s Wells, Shoreditch Town Hall and Southbank Centre. Performing companies and artists have included Complicite, Improbable, Peeping Tom, Marcel Marceau, Toby Jones, Bill Irwin, Nola Rae and Jacques Lecoq.

The festival received Arts Council funding and subsequently became an Arts Council England National Portfolio Organisation.

The final edition took place in 2023, the festival’s 47th year.

== MimeLondon ==
Following the closure of LIMF, Lannaghan and Seelig established MimeLondon, a programme of visual theatre presented in collaboration with London venues. Its inaugural season ran from 12 January to 17 February 2024, with eight productions at the Barbican Centre, National Theatre, Sadler’s Wells and Shoreditch Town Hall. Four productions were by overseas companies and four by British companies whose work LIMF had co-commissioned during its final year.

== Awards ==
In 2012, Helen Lannaghan and Joseph Seelig received a Total Theatre Award for their significant contribution to theatre as co-directors of LIMF. In 2017, the festival received the Peter Brook Special Achievement Award at the Empty Space Peter Brook Awards.

Productions presented at LIMF received nominations for the Olivier Award for Best New Dance Production:

Award year	Production	Company	Result
2014	What’s Become of You? (Questcequetudeviens?)	Compagnie 111 — Aurélien Bory / Stéphanie Fuster	Nominated
2015	32 rue Vandenbranden	Peeping Tom	Joint winner
2016	He Who Falls (Celui qui tombe)	Compagnie Yoann Bourgeois	Nominated
2023	Triptych (The Missing Door, The Lost Room, and The Hidden Floor)	Peeping Tom	Nominated

The nominations and results are recorded in the Olivier Awards’ annual archives.
