= Nola Rae =

Mime artist

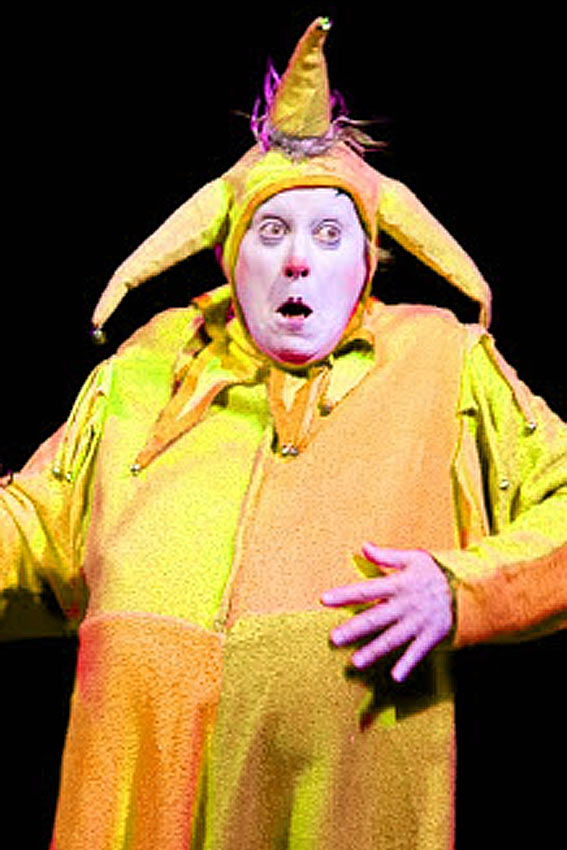

Nola Rae MBE (born 1950) is a mime artist.

== Biography ==
=== Early life and education ===
Rae was born in Sydney, Australia, in 1949 and migrated to London with her family in 1963.

Originally hoping to become a dancer, at 16 she began training at the Royal Ballet School in London and then danced professionally at Malmö Stadsteater and Tivoli Garden's Pantomime Theatre in Copenhagen. However, realising that she might not succeed in ballet, she turned to mime and studied with Marcel Marceau in Paris.

=== Career ===
She was a founder member of the French-based International Research Troupe Kiss, co-founded Friends Roadshow with Jango Edwards, and was a member of the Bristol Old Vic Company. In 1974, she founded the London Mime Theatre with Matthew Ridout, with whom she has worked ever since. Nola and Joseph Seelig were the original instigators of the London International Mime Festival, which is held in January each year, and has been running since 1977.

Rae premiered her first solo show at Le Festival du Monde in Nancy in 1975. Since then she has created 12 full-length shows and toured the world. She combines mime, clowning, puppetry and dance and has performed in over 60 countries. A great lover of the works of William Shakespeare, she created Shakespeare the Works with John Mowat, where four of the Bard's tragedies were turned into comedies, and included a version of Hamlet for two hands. She later tackled A Midsummer Night's Dream, where the fairies were represented by puppet salad vegetables.

In 1990, Rae radically changed her style and began to present full length comic dramas where one wordless character is developed over an evening. One example is Elizabeth’s Last Stand, directed by Simon McBurney. It explores the loneliness of an old woman when she develops delusions of grandeur and tries to recreate the court of Elizabeth I of England in her living room. This was followed in 1993 by a two-woman show with the contemporary dancer Sally Owen. Directed by Carlos Trafic, from Argentina, And the Ship Sailed On explored the clash of two women of different cultures who are forced to share a small cabin on a nightmarish voyage of immigration.

In Mozart Preposteroso Rae presents a clown's fantasy on the life of a musical phenomenon. Exit Napoleon Pursued by Rabbits was inspired in part by Charlie Chaplin's The Great Dictator. It deals with dangerous charisma and how to get it, following the transformation of a hobo into Napoleon and then Hitler. Home Made Shakespeare with the Swedish actor Lasse Äkerlund has her using her voice on stage for the first time. She also gives workshops, lecture demonstrations and master classes.

Rae is also in demand as a director, her speciality being subverting tragedies, by turning them into clown plays. She began with The House of Bernarda Alba by Garcia Lorca, performed by the Swedish all-women clown group Teater Manjaña. They won the Swedish Humour prize for the funniest show of 1996. Other winners were Birgit Nilsson for her biography and Lee Evans who won the international humour prize. She has also directed Miss Julie by August Strindberg for the same group, a hit at the 1998 Strindberg Festival in Stockholm. The latest directing project in Sweden is Ben Hur set in an old people's home. Her directing work in Norway includes Doña Quixote by Coby Omvlee and Ibsen's The Wild Duck for the Oslo Nye Teater. She also directed The Three Musketeers (the clown version) for Les Anges Perdus in Vienna 2006.

Over the years, Rae has made numerous television appearances. They include a BBC Playhouse Special After You Hugo, where she played a French dancer who impersonates the Russian ballerina Anna Pavlova in variety theatre. She has been the subject of two documentaries : BBC Arena and Meridian Television's The Pier.

== Awards ==
Rae received a Total Theatre Lifetime Achievement Award in 1999, the Charlie Rivel Award for Clowning from the Festival of Amandola; and was inducted into the International Clown Hall of Fame in the United States in 2000.

In 2008, Rae was awarded an MBE by the Queen in her New Year's Honours List for services to drama and to mime.
