= Scottee =

British actor

Scottee is an activist, actor and writer from North London.

Scottee has created activist artworks and projects with communities across the UK and Ireland. These have included working with his grandfather to tackle ageism, public artwork in Southend addressing queer trauma, Hamburger Queen, a talent show for fat people exploring fat activism, establishing Peterborough Pride, participant-led dance show Fat Blokes, and stage show Class looking at poverty and class system in the UK.,

Scottee has written on subjects for newspapers such as The Guardian, i-D Magazine and Global Citizen. In a piece in The Guardian expressing concerns about pay and the problems of working in the arts industry, he stated: "The arts are essentially a namby-pamby life of stealing Wi-Fi, cheap coffee, waiting tables and overpriced weekend workshops in improvisation that leaves you, at times, financially and mentally unstable."

He was co-host for almost 10 years to BBC Radio 4's Loose Ends after first appearing on the programme on 18 December 2012.,. In 2020 Scottee became the host of the After The Tone podcast, first published in August that year.

In 2017 Scottee became Associate Research Fellow at the Birkbeck Centre for Contemporary Theatre, University of London, and 2018 he became an Associate Artist at HOME, Manchester. From 2017 to 2023, he was the Artistic Director of Scottee & Friends Ltd.

In 2024, he played the supporting character of Noam in BBC One miniseries The Listeners, adapted from the 2021 novel of the same name by Jordan Tannahill.
