= Jacksons Lane =

Arts venue in Highgate, London

Jacksons Lane Arts Centre
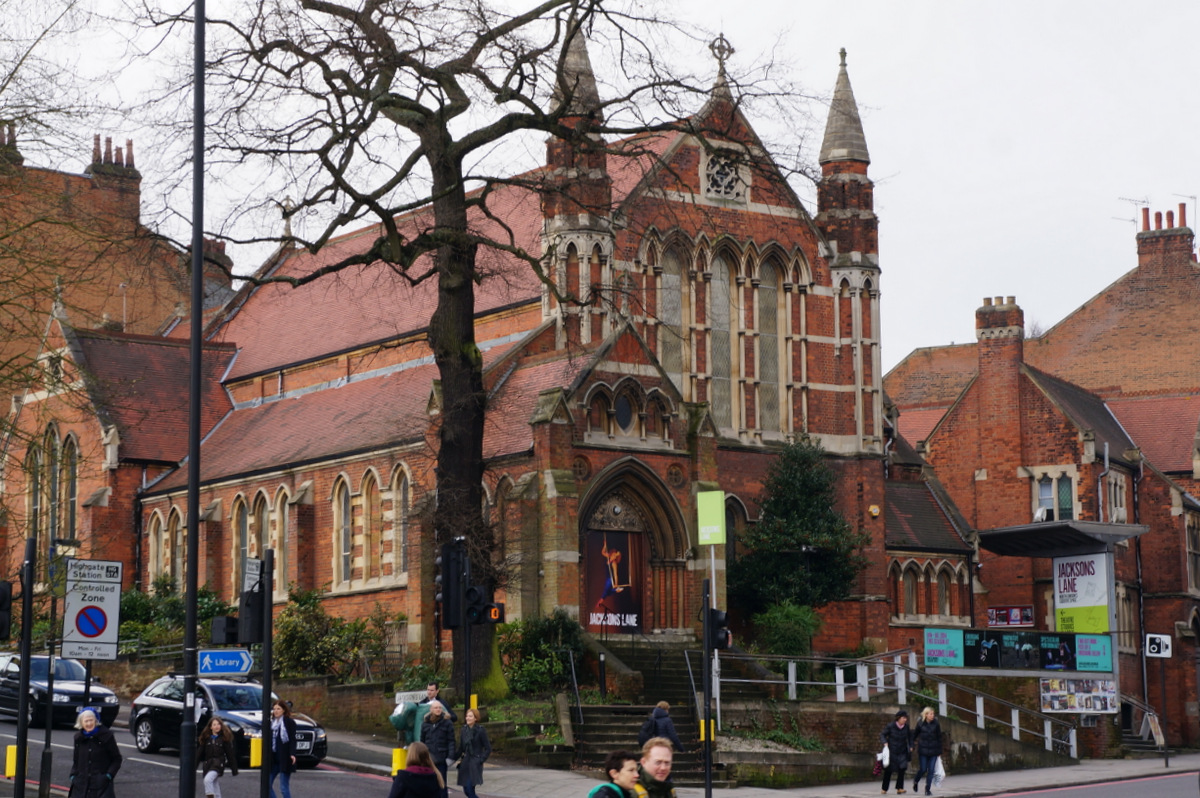
- Interactive map of Jacksons Lane Arts Centre
- Address: Archway Road; London, N6; United Kingdom
- Coordinates: 51.57659°N 0.14528°W
- Owner: Jacksons Lane Ltd
- Capacity: 166 (250 including standing) plus 5 multi-purpose spaces
- Type: Arts centre
- Public transit: Highgate

Construction
- Opened: 1975; 51 years ago

Website
- http://www.jacksonslane.org.uk/

Jacksons Lane Arts Centre (JLAC) is a multi-arts venue in Highgate, north London, located in a Grade II listed former Wesleyan Methodist church. The building is home to a 170 capacity theatre, a large scale dance and rehearsal studio, a cafe-bar and four other multi-purpose spaces. In 2022 it completed a large-scale £5 million refurbishment & redevelopment of the building with the majority of the funding coming from Arts Council England & Haringey Council. JLAC is now more accessible, has greater facilities, a larger front of house area and two new circus creation spaces.

== Background ==
Jacksons Lane Arts Centre is based in Highgate, north London – a theatre, a centre for participation, and a space for new circus theatre companies and artists to create and perform. The venue has a history of innovative work including experimental visual theatre companies, contemporary dance and circus. It was acknowledged in Sideshow Magazine's 'State of the Circus' report as the UK's leading presenter and supporter of contemporary circus.

JLAC supports some 100 companies and artists every year. It offers mentoring, space, production, commissioning, technical support, promotion and production. In 2015 it commissioned two brand new productions as part of its 40th Birthday, involving emerging collective Silver Lining with Throwback and a brand new work from Gandini Juggling – Meta. Jacksons Lane was hailed as "a breeding ground for fast-rising talent" by the Time Out magazine.

JLAC hosts several productions each year as part of The London International Mime Festival and supports the annual Total Theatre Award for Circus at the Edinburgh Festival.

Established names and companies such as Complicité, The Mighty Boosh, Shared Experience, Stephen Merchant, Out of Joint and Frantic Assembly have all performed or developed work at Jacksons Lane over the venue's 48-year history. Matt Lucas and David Walliams (Little Britain) started out at Jacksons Lane.

Jacksons Lane was the venue for the European Juggling Convention in 1980.

Partners include The Roundhouse, Circus Space, Crying Out Loud, The Place and Sadlers Wells. JLAC is managed by a board of trustee.

JLAC has six spaces including its 170 capacity main theatre, as well as one of the largest dance and rehearsal spaces in the UK. The theatre itself won a RIBA Community Enterprise award for its design by Tim Ronalds.

== Funding ==
JLAC is funded by Haringey Council, Arts Council England, John Lyons Charity and Children In Need.

== History ==
Highgate or Jackson's Lane Wesleyan Methodist church was opened in 1905, on the current site at the corner of Archway Road and Jacksons Lane. The building was of red brick with stone dressings, designed in an early Gothic style included a Sunday school and was designed by W. H. Boney of Highgate. The church seated 650 and the schoolroom 400. Jackson's Lane was well known during the 1960s for its community work. The church was closed in 1975 and reopened to begin its new incarnation as an arts centre and centre for the North London community.
