= Greentop Circus =

Circus school in Sheffield, Yorkshire, England

Information
- Established: 1995; 31 years ago

Greentop Community Circus Centre is a charitable organisation - a circus school and training centre located in Sheffield, Yorkshire, England. It was established in 1995 on the TV programme Challenge Anneka, and is one of three UK circus schools providing accredited level training courses in circus skills.

The school was founded and run by volunteers before investment from the Arts Council England, provided funds for paid staff. Public funding is complemented by earned income through social enterprises.

The school is a founder member of the UK Circus Training Action Group alongside three other UK circus schools: The Circus Space, Circomedia, and Skylight. It is based in the former church of St Thomas, Brightside, Sheffield.
