= Physical theatre =

Genre of theatrical performance

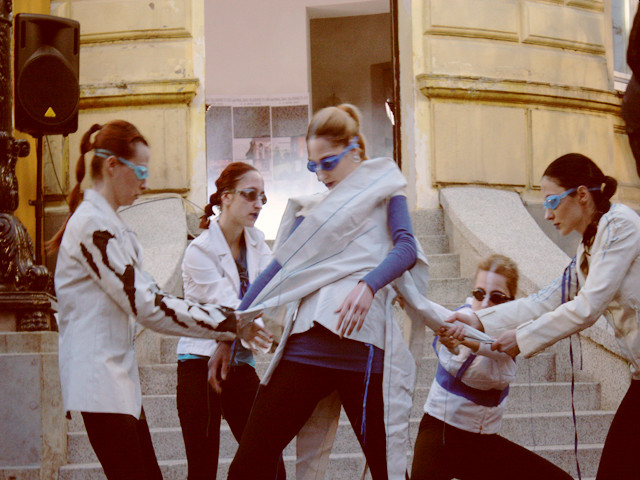
Physical theatre street performance

Physical theatre is a genre of theatrical performance that encompasses storytelling primarily through physical movement. Although several performance theatre disciplines are often described as "physical theatre", the genre's characteristic aspect is a reliance on the performers' physical motion rather than, or combined with, text to convey storytelling. Performers can communicate through various body gestures (including using the body to portray emotions).

== Common elements ==
Certain institutions suggest that all physical theatre genres share common characteristics, although individual performances do not need to exhibit all such characteristics to be defined as physical theatre. Research into the training or "work" of physical theatre artists cites an amalgamation of numerous elements adopted as a means to further inform the theatrical research/production. These elements include:

- Inter-disciplinary origins, spanning music, dance, visual art, etc., as well as theatre
- Challenging the traditional, proscenium arch, and the traditional performer/audience relationship (also known as "breaking the fourth wall").
- Encouraging audience participation, any interaction that occurs physically throughout the course of a performance.

Some practitioners, such as Lloyd Newson, despite being the first company to incorporate the term Physical Theater into his company's title (DV8 Physical Theater), have expressed concern that the expression is now being used as a "miscellaneous" category, which includes anything that does not fall neatly into literary dramatic theater or contemporary dance. Newson is also frustrated that many companies and performers who describe what they do as physical theatre lack physical skills, training and/or expertise in movement. As such, contemporary theatre approaches (including post-modern performance, devised performance, visual performance, post-dramatic performance, etc.), while having their own distinct definitions, are often simply labelled "physical theatre" for no other reason than they are unusual in some way.

Dance that is of a theatrical nature can also be problematic. A dance piece may be called "physical theatre" simply because it includes elements of spoken word, character, or narrative. However, although it is theatrical and physical, it may not necessarily share anything in common with the physical theatre tradition.

== Modern physical theatre ==
Contemporary dance troupe performing in New York, 2009

A modern physical theatre has grown from a variety of origins. Mime and theatrical clowning schools, such as L'École Internationale de Théâtre Jacques Lecoq in Paris, have had a big influence on many modern expressions of physical theatre. Practitioners such as Steven Berkoff and John Wright received their initial training at such institutions. Contemporary dance has also had a strong influence on what we regard as physical theatre, partly because most physical theatre requires actors to have a certain level of physical control and flexibility. These qualities are rarely found in those who do not have some sort of movement background. Modern physical theatre also has strong roots in more ancient traditions such as Commedia dell'arte, and some suggest links to the ancient greek theatre, particularly the theatre of Aristophanes.

Another physical theatre tradition started with the French master Etienne Decroux (father of corporeal mime). Decroux's aim was to create a theatre based on the physicality of the actor, allowing the creation of a more metaphorical theatre. This tradition has grown, and corporeal mime is now taught in many major theatrical schools.

Daniel Stein, a teacher out of the lineage of Etienne Decroux, has this to say about physical theatre:

'I think physical theatre is much more visceral and audiences are affected much more viscerally than intellectually. The foundation of theatre is a live, human experience, which is different from any other form of art that I know of. Live theatre, where real human beings are standing in front of real human beings, is about the fact that we have all set aside this hour; the sharing goes in both directions. The fact that it is a very physical, visceral form makes it a very different experience from almost anything else that we partake of in our lives. I don’t think we could do it the same way if we were doing literary-based theatre.'

Arguably, the point at which physical theatre became distinct from pure mime is when Jean-Louis Barrault (a student of Decroux) rejected his teacher's notion that the mime should be silent. If a mime uses their voice then they would have a whole range of possibilities open to them that previously would not have existed. This idea became known as "Total Theatre" and Barrault advocated that no theatrical element should assume primacy over another: movement, music, visual image, text etc. He viewed each element as equally important, and believed that each should be explored for their possibilities.

Barrault was a member of Michel Saint-Denis's company, alongside Antonin Artaud. Artaud has also been highly influential in shaping what has become known as physical theatre. Artaud rejected the primacy of the text and suggested a theatre in which the proscenium arch is disposed of to have a more direct relationship with the audience.

Eastern theatre traditions have influenced some practitioners who have then influenced physical theatre. A number of Oriental traditions have a high level of physical training, and are visual masterpieces. The Japanese Noh tradition, in particular, has often been often upon. The energy and visual nature of Balinese theatre fascinated Antonin Artaud and he wrote extensively on it. Noh has been important for many practitioners including Lecoq, who based his neutral mask on the calm mask of Noh. Jerzy Grotowski, Peter Brook, Jacques Copeau and Joan Littlewood have all been consciously influenced by Noh. Alongside contemporary western practitioners, certain Japanese theatre practitioners were influenced by their own traditions. Tadashi Suzuki drew partly on Noh and his students and collaborators have disseminated his highly physical training into the west. This has particularly happened through Anne Bogart's collaboration with him, and the simultaneous training of her actors in both the Viewpoints method and Suzuki training. As well as Suzuki, the Butoh Movement, which originated from Tatsumi Hijikata and Kazuo Ohno contained elements of Noh imagery and physicality. Butoh, again, has been influencing Western practitioners in recent years, and has certain similarities with Lecoq's mime training in terms of ideas (impression and consequential embodiment of imagery, use of mask, etc.)

Besides a gradual infusion of ideas from outside the Western theatre tradition, influences have arisen from within theatre as well starting with Konstantin Stanislavski. Later in life, Stanislavski began to reject his own ideas of naturalism, and started to pursue ideas relating to the physical body in performance. Meyerhold and Grotowski developed these ideas and began to develop actor training that included a very high level of physical training. Peter Brook influenced and developed this work.

Contemporary dance has added significantly to this mix, starting particularly with Rudolf von Laban. Laban developed a way of looking at movement outside codified dance, and was instrumental in envisioning and creating movement not just for dancers but for actors as well. Later on, the Tanzteater of Pina Bausch and others looked at the relationship between dance and theatre. In America, the postmodern dance movement of the Judson Church Dance also began to influence theatre practitioners, as their suggestions for movement and somatic training are equally accessible for those with dance training as those with theatre training. Indeed, Steve Paxton taught theatre students at Dartington College of Arts and other institutions.

== Notable performers ==
Physical theatre companies and practitioners include:

=== Companies ===
- American Physical Theater
- Canadian Deaf Theatre
- Chotto Ookii Theatre Company
- Complicité
- Double Edge Theatre
- DV8 Physical Theatre
- Familie Flöz
- Frantic Assembly
- Gecko
- Horse and Bamboo Theatre
- Kage Physical Theatre
- KimchiBrot Connection
- Kneehigh Theatre
- Legs On The Wall
- Margolis Brown Adaptors Company
- Motionhouse
- Pig Iron Theatre Company
- Shared Experience
- SITI Company
- Spymonkey
- Synetic Theater
- Theatre de l'Ange Fou
- Théâtre du Soleil
- Theo Adams Company
- Trestle Theatre

=== Practitioners ===
- Theo Adams
- Antonin Artaud
- Pina Bausch
- Steven Berkoff
- Anne Bogart
- Wolfe Bowart
- Les Bubb
- Romeo Castellucci
- Kate Champion
- Alan Clay
- Carlo Mazzone-Clementi
- Adam Darius
- Philippe Decouflé
- Étienne Decroux
- Avner the Eccentric
- Antonio Fava
- Philippe Gaulier
- Niranjan Goswami
- Jerzy Grotowski
- Kathryn Hunter
- Lindsay Kemp
- Ireneusz Krosny
- Thomas Leabhart
- Jacques Lecoq
- Peta Lily
- Marcel Marceau
- Linda Marlowe
- Petra Massey
- Johnny Melville
- Matt Mitler
- Thomas Monckton
- Lloyd Newson
- Dimitris Papaioannou
- Robin Patterson
- Adrian Pecknold
- Alain Platel
- Jami Reid-Quarrell
- Bill Robison
- Richmond Shepard
- Daniel Stein
- Tadashi Suzuki
- Julie Taymor
- James Thiérrée
- Henryk Tomaszewski
- Steven Wasson
- Robert Wilson
- Arthur Yorinks
- Vahram Zaryan

=== Double acts ===
- Gamarjobat
- Shields and Yarnell
- The Umbilical Brothers
- Tik and Tok

=== Institutes and training programmes ===
- École Philippe Gaulier
- Circomedia
- Dell'Arte International School of Physical Theatre
- East 15 Acting School
- Fourth Monkey Actor Training Company
- L'École Internationale de Théâtre Jacques Lecoq
- London International School of Performing Arts
- Coastal Carolina University
- Accademia dell'Arte

== See also ==
- Corporeal mime
- Mime artist
- Pantomime
