= Marko Stojanović (actor) =

Serbian mime artist (born 1971)

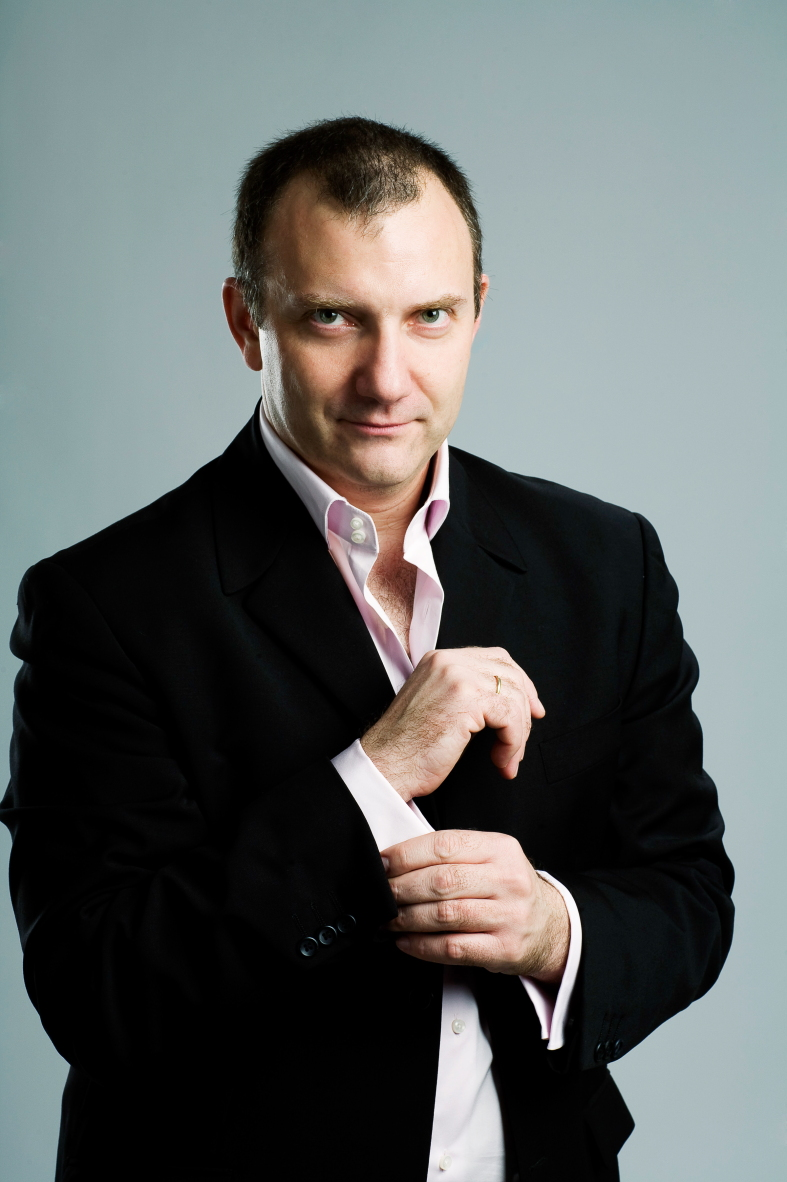
- Marko Stojanović
- Born: January 2, 1971; Belgrade, SFRY
- Occupation: Actor
- Years active: 1990–present
- Spouse: Dara Gravara-Stojanović
- Children: 1

Marko Stojanović (born January 2, 1971) is a Serbian celebrity, theatre and TV actor and comedian, renown mime artist, and university professor, director, humanitarian and sports worker. He is the co-founder and the president of the World Mime Organisation.

During the COVID-19 pandemic he started a global online initiative #artistsagainstcorona and its localised Serbian language version #umetniciprotivkorone on March 16, 2020, with the support of the World Mime Organisation. The initiative was accepted immediately, mostly on Facebook and many localisations were made.

== Biography ==
He was an acting director of the Belgrade Youth Center from 2013 to 2015, and he is one of the founders together with Israeli mime artists Ofer Blum and president of the "World Mime Organisation" and the president of the "National Curling Association of Serbia". He was a Senior Lecturer for the subjects of Acting and the Stage Movement and Head of the Acting Department of the Academy of Fine Arts in Belgrade, and now he is an associate professor for the subject Stage Movement at the Acting Department of the Sinergija University in Bijeljina, Republic of Srpska, and a visiting lecturer of Communication Skills at Singidunum University in Belgrade, Serbia.

== Education ==
Marko was accepted at the age of 16 at the Faculty of Dramatic Arts, Acting Department, in 1987 and acquired a Bachelor of Arts degree in acting in 1991. In 1989 he was selected to participate in a three-week student exchange program in Leningrad State Institute of Theatre, Music and Cinema, Leningrad, USSR (now St. Petersburg, Russia). A year later (1990) he was part of a ten student delegation of the Faculty of Dramatic Arts in Belgrade that received a fellowship from the US Government for an eight weeks "Arts Management" study program at the University of South Carolina and a one-week professional course in film directing at the South Carolina Media Arts Institute, in Columbia, South Carolina, United States. In 1991 he was accepted and offered a full one-year scholarship at the Paris Marcel Marceau’s International School of Mime for a year long professional skills improvement. In 1992 - 1993, he was participating in a one year long professional course in film directing at "Mon Film a Moi", in Paris, France.

== Career ==
=== Acting in theatre ===
Year	Title	Role	Theatre/Festival
2000s
2019	"Music Time Travel"	Mihailo Teslic the scientist	International Association of Music Lovers
2018	"Clownconcert"	The Clown	International Association of Music Lovers & Kolarac Concert Hall
2017	"Cricket and Ant"	Narrator	Corporate production for a Charity Show in Belgrade
2016	“Crazy Olympians”	Zeus	Georgian State Pantomime Theatre, Tbilisi, Georgia
2015-2017	“A Concert for Clown and Orchestra”	Clown	Kolarac Concert Hall, Belgrade
2014	“The Adventurer”	The Adventurer	Belgrade Youth Centre, Belgrade, Serbia
2008-2015	“Tito the Performance”	Tito	The Blue Train, Belgrade, Serbia
2005-2012	“A Pound of Laughter” Stand-Up comedy	Himself	Premier in New York, tours in Serbia, USA and Canada
2004-2006	“Inquiry Barn”	Politician (Lead Role)	Indexovci Theatre Co., tours in Serbia, Canada, USA, and Switzerland
2003-2007	“Elections! You asked for it!”	Different roles (Lead Role)	Indexovci Theatre Co. tours in Serbia, Canada, USA, Switzerland, Sweden
2003-2005	"Cricket and Ant"	Cricket	The Snail Children’s Theatre in Belgrade, tour in Canada
1990s
1995-2000	"The Grease"	Rodger	Theatre T, Pozorište na Terazijama, Belgrade
1999	"Santa Claus and the Ninja Eskimos"	Dark Santa	BUFFA Agency and Art Hall, Belgrade/Valjevo
1998	"Marko Strikes Back"	Marko	BUFFA Agency and Dusko Radovic Theatre, Belgrade
1996-1999	"Awaiting Heaven"	Paisant (Lead Role)	BUFFA Agency and Dusko Radovic Theatre, Belgrade International Monodrama and Mime Festival, Zemun 1996 The First Yugoslav Theatre Show with a Website 1997
1996-1997	"A Girl With Matches"	Boy of Matches	Dusko Radovic Children’s Theatre, Belgrade International Children’s Theatre Festival Kotor 1996 Serbian Puppet Theatre Festival Zrenjanin 1996 FESTIC Belgrade Children’s Theatre Festival 1996
1995	"Sex, Drugs & Rock 'n' Roll"	Rocker	Theatre Z and SKC, Belgrade
1995	"The Midge"	Narrator	Theatre Z, Belgrade Edinburgh International Festival-Fringe 1995
1995	"Bartholomew Fair"	Littlevit	Yugoslav Drama Theatre, Belgrade
1993	"Frieda’s Flight"	Damir	La Compagnie Quarks, Paris, Festival d’Avignon Off, Avignon France Europe Teater Treffen ‘93, International Festival Stuttgart, Germany
1993	"Peleas and Melisanda"	Peleas’s brother	Fete de la Jeunesse, Paris Youth Festival 1993
1991-1993	"Bloody Sports"	Sportsman	International Monodrama and Mime Festival, Zemun 1991 Fete de la Jeunesse, Paris Youth Festival 1993
1992	"The Way of The Empire"	Cerberus	Theatre de la Porte d’Italie, Toulon France
1991	"The Midge"	Ruzante	Academia Theatre, Belgrade
1990-1991	"The Pancevo Cabaret"	First Actor	Pancevo Theatre, Pancevo Festival of Professional Theatres of Voyvodina, Zrenanin 1991
1990-1991	"Fathers and Forefathers"	Young Communist	Atelier 212, Belgrade
1980s
1989	"A Midsummer Night's Dream"	Lysandre	Academia Theatre, Belgrade Skopje Student Festival, Macedonian 1989
1989	"The Balcony"	Judge	Academia Theatre, Belgrade, Skopje Student Festival, Macedonia 1989
1989-1990	"The Unseen Hand"	Kid	Belgrade Drama Theatre
1988-1990	"Apparition of Jesus Christ in a Military Base 2507	Tomcha"	Theatre “Kod konja”, Boško Buha Theatre
1988	"Marriage Proposal"	Lomov	Academia Theatre, Belgrade

=== Filmography (selected roles in film and TV) ===
Year	Title	Role			
1990s
1990	Catharsis (short)	Boyfriend (Lead Role)			
1991	Ars longa, vita brevis (short)	Student (Lead Role)			
1993	Antoine Rives, juge du terrorisme (TV series)				
1995	Burglar / original:"Provalnik" (TV movie)	Jovica			
1996	Happy People / original:"Srećni ljudi" (TV series)	Rookie Policeman			
1997	Saturday Night Fever / original:"Groznica subotnje večeri" (TV series)	Different Characters (Lead Role)			
1997	Life 101 / original:"Mala škola života" (TV series)	Professor (Lead Role)			
1997-1998	The Marriage Zone / original:"Zona braka" (TV series)	Husband (Lead Role)			
2000s
2002	Seven-star Hotel / original:"Hotel sa 7 zvezdica" (TV series)	Bajkić			
2003	The Professional / original:"Profesionalac"	Man with a head (Čovek sa glavom)			
2004	Karađorđe i pozorište (TV series)	Frenchman (Francuz)			
2003-2007	The Index Theatre: Elections! You Asked for It / original title:"Indexovci: Izbori, jer ste vi to tražili" (TV Theatre Comedy / TV Series)	Different Characters (Lead Role)			
2005	The Index Theatre: Inquiry Barn / original title:"Indeksovci: Anketni obor" (TV Theatre Comedy)	Politician (Lead Role)			
2006-2007	The SiS Agency / original title:"Agencija za SiS" (TV series)	Slavko			
2007-2008	The European Face (Pre-Eurovision Song Contest Show) / original title:"Evropsko lice" (TV show program)	Different Characters (Special Guest Star)			
2007	Pub Next-doors to the SiS / original title:"Kafanica blizu SiS-a" (TV series)	Slavko			
2010s
2011	Coriolanus (UK/US Film directed by: Ralph Fiennes)	Citizen			
2014	The Tenor – Lirico Spinto (Korean Movie directed by: Sang Man Kim)	Dr.Franz			
2015	MarkoS Crash Course: Serbian for Tourists (TV i web series)	Himself			
2015	CurlingFun (TV i web series)	Different characters (Lead Role)			
2018	Humor i satira 1830–1914. (TV Series)	Master of Ceremonies (Lead Role)			
2018	Old Belgrade Cabaret (TV Mini Series)	Kir Sima (Lead Role)			
2019	Igraj za zavičaj (TV Quizz Series)	Mime (Special Guest Star)			
2019	The Outpost (TV Series)	Covenant Engineer	2020	Non-Verbal Communication (TV Series)	Himself and screenplay

== Membership in organisations ==
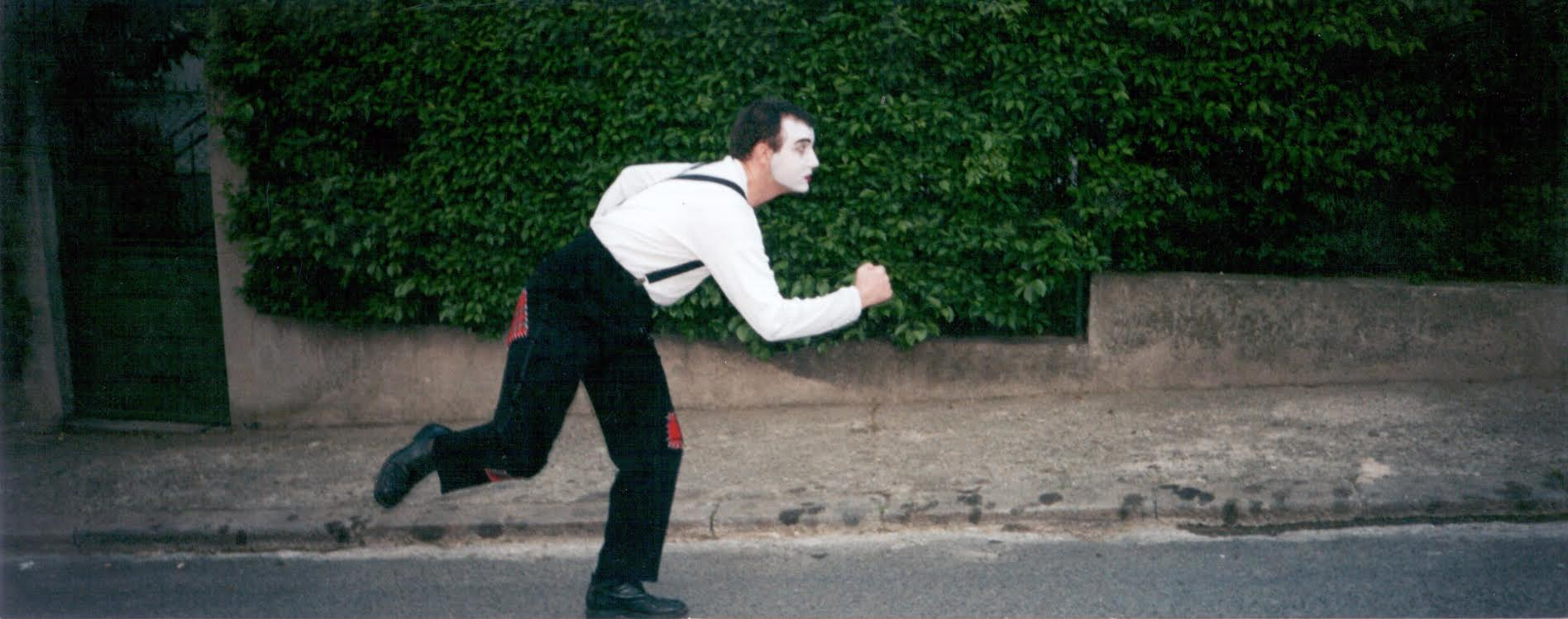
Marko Stojanović during performance Mime Running

Marko Stojanović is member of several organisation, in the role of president, Member of the council, representative, or standard.member.

- International Visitor Leadership Program Alumni (US Department of State Bureau of Education and Cultural Affairs)
- President of the World Mime Organization
- President of the National Curling Association of Serbia
- Member of the International Theatre Institute Forum for Theatre Training & Education FTTE
- Member of the International Dance Council (CID-UNESCO)
- Member of the Board of Directors of the Crown Prince Alexander Foundation for Education
- National Representative to the World Curling Federation
- Former President of the Commission for Culture and Olympic Education of the National Olympic Committee of Serbia
- Former Member of the Council to the Mayor of Belgrade for People with Disabilities
- Former Non-voting member of the Presidium (Exec Board) of the National Olympic Committee of Serbia
- International coordinator of the Youth, Education and Culture Committee of the “Federation Internationale Cinema et Television Sportifs” (Federation recognized by the International Olympic Committee and based in Milan, Italy)
- Member of the Permanent Marketing and Communication Committee of the “Federation Internationale Cinema et Television Sportifs”
- Member of the Association of Dramatic Artists of Serbia
- President of the Balkan Curling Federation
- Member by invitation of the Public Relations Society of Serbia
- National Representative to the European Curling Federation
- Former Member of the National Committee for Smoking Prevention of the Ministry of Health of the Republic of Serbia
- Former Member of the Managing Board of the “Always with Children” Charity (Anti Pediatric Cancer Organization)
- Former member of the charity organization “The Dream Board”

== Awards ==
Marko Stojanović received over 30 domestic and international awards and recognitions, including:

- 2015 “Ambassador of Serbia” for congress tourism by the National Congress Bureau of Serbia of the Tourist Organization of Serbia for outstanding organization of the 4th World Curling Congress in Belgrade, Serbia
- 2015 "The Biomelem Company Award" for the support of the development of women's entrepreneurship through project “Serbian Soul Inclusive” and the support to the education of young people through the "School of Entrepreneurship"
- 2014 "Award of the “My Hero” Association for the Contribution” of the informing of young people, promoting virtue and true values
- 2014 “Plaquette for the Outstanding Contribution to the Improvement of the Social Status and the Quality of Life of the Roma Population in the Republic of Serbia” by the Roma National Minority Council of Serbia on the occasion of the UN World Roma Day
- 2013 "Special Award for Creative Contribution to the Development of the Culture of Communication" by the Association for Marketing Communications of Serbia
- 2013 “Best Youth Theatre Play Award” by International Festival of children's and youth theater plays (DOPS), Jagodina
- 2013 “Special Award” for the Contribution to the Development and Promotion of the Art of Mime in Serbia awarded by the Festival Council of the International Monodrama and Mime Festival in Zemun
- 2010 ”The Star of Belgrade” awarded by the Agency for European Integrations and Cooperation with the NGO of the City of Belgrade to Marko Stojanovic as and aouthor of the “Music of Silence” project dealing with the social inclusion of deaf children through the art of mime
- 2010 ”Dragoslav Simic Diploma” at the 10th Festival of short stage plays for directing “The Tree of Life” a mime play with young deaf mime artists
- 2009 Special “Culture Through Sport” Award for organizing the First Belgrade International FICTS Sports Film Festival. Awarded by the Federation Internationale Cinema Television Sportifs
- 2008 The International Olympic Committee “Sport and Youth” Trophy 2008 for promotion and development of sports and Olympic educational youth programmes. The IOC Trophy is given to the National Olympic Committees to be awarded to an individual or an institution of the NOC’s choice.
- 2008 The Crystal Medal and Diploma “Guirland d’Honnour” for promoting of films about sport and people with disabilities and FICTS festival during the National celebration of the World Disability Day. Awarded by the Federation Internationale Cinema Television Sportifs
- 2007 Special Prize and Diploma “Guirland d’Honnour” for directing a short film “Olympic Room” at the 25th International Sport Movies and TV Festival in Milan, Italy
- 2007 Award for the Contribution to the Development of Sports of the City of Petrovac na Mlavi
- 2004 Popularity Oscar for the comedy of the Year 2003
- 2004 Melko Award for the best comedy in 2003
- 1998 Two times winner of the Pink Grand Prix of The Radio Belgrade 202 for charity work
- 1996 Yugoslav Best Actor Award for "Girl With Matches", at the Yugoslav Children’s Theatre Festival, Kotor, Yugoslavia.
- 1996 National Best Actor Award for “Girl With Matches", at the Serbian Puppet Theatre Festival, Zrenjanin, Yugoslavia.
- 1996 Award for Achievements in Mime for “Girl With Matches", FESTIC Belgrade Children’s Theatre Festival, Belgrade, Yugoslavia
- 1996 Bozidar Valtrovic Annual Award for “Girl With Matches", “Dusko Radovic” Theatre, Belgrade, Yugoslavia
- 1991 Special Prize for “Bloody Sports” on the 19th International Monodrama and Pantomime Festival in Zemun, Yugoslavia.
- 1991 Special Diploma for leading role in “Cabaret” on the 41st Festival of Professional Theatres in Zrenjanin, Yugoslavia
- 1991 Best Play Award for “Barrister Pathelin”, on BAP Festival in Belgrade.
- 1991 The Jankovic Sisters Award for Young Talents in Comedy, University of Arts, Faculty of Dramatic Arts Belgrade, Yugoslavia
- 1990 The Jankovic Sisters Award for Young Talents in Comedy, University of Arts, Faculty of Dramatic Arts Belgrade, Yugoslavia

== See also ==
- World Mime Organisation
- World Mime Day
- National Curling Association of Serbia
