= Stanisław Brzozowski (mime artist) =

Polish mime artist

Stanisław Brzozowski (also Stanislaw Brosowski or Staszek Brosowski; born 1938) is a Polish mime artist.

== Life ==
Brzozowski founded his career in the 1950s as a student in the ensemble of Henryk Tomaszewski, the founder and director of the Wrocław Mime Theater (Wrocławski Teatr Pantomimy), where he worked and rose to the status of soloist. At the end of the 1960s Brzozowski did not return to Poland after a trip through Western Europe and was based in Sweden. Since 1970, he has been teaching at the Stockholm Danshögskolan (Dance College) and at the Teaterhögskolan (Theatre Collere) since the beginning of 1993. After several reorganisations and mergers those schools are since 2011 known as Stockholm Academy of Dramatic Arts where Brzozowski is a professor.

== Work ==
Brzozowski regarded the art of mime as movement theater and an integral part of the expression vocabulary of actors and not as a part of the dance. Thus, the body language taught by Brzozowski has less to do with the stereo- and archetypes-based portrayals of the circus, fairs and street mimes. Rather, he teaches a grammar of the body that analyzes and exercises the interplay of each part of the motion apparatus in interaction with the environment. Thus he is, in the tradition of Henryk Tomaszewski, much closer to the old master of the French pantomime, Étienne Decroux. In contrast to Decroux, however, Brzozowski renounces an excessively large abstraction in the representation.

== Awards ==
In December 2016, Brzozowski was awarded the “Special WMO Award for the outstanding contribution to the art of mime” by the World Mime Organisation (WMO). In the decision by the WMO it was written: "In his youth professor Brosowski worked with famous Henryk Tomaszewski in Wroclaw Mime Theatre in Poland, where he was a soloist and he has developed his own style of performing and teaching. His career as a pedagogue flourished in Sweden for the past 47 years where he is still influencing and inspiring young actors, mime artists and dancers as well as Swedish theatre and theatre across Europe and the world where his students are working and creating."
