= Steven Wasson =

American and French director

Steven Wasson (born 1950 in the United States), is the director of Theatre de l'Ange Fou, and the International School of Corporeal mime. He studied literature and drama at the University of Northern Colorado with Dr. Lloyd Norton, and mime with Dr. E. Reid Gilbert and Thomas Leabhart at the Valley Studio in Madison, Wisconsin. Coming to Paris, he was a student of Étienne Decroux and later became his assistant, participating in Decroux's teaching, research and creations. Decroux created two pieces on Wasson: Le Prophete and Le Duo dans le Parc St. Cloud. Wasson has created and directed all of the plays for the Theatre de l’Ange Fou, and has performed in many of them. He has worked as an actor in film, TV and live radio in the U.S. and France. In 1996, he reconstructed and directed the mime scenes for the Royal Shakespeare Company's production of Les Enfants du Paradis. He has also worked with Birmingham Repertory Theatre and in India with the Avatar Meher Baba Theatre. As the director of Shadow Films Ltd., Wasson creates artistic and pedagogical films for the company and the school.
