= Roberto Escobar and Igón Lerchundi =

Argentine mime artists

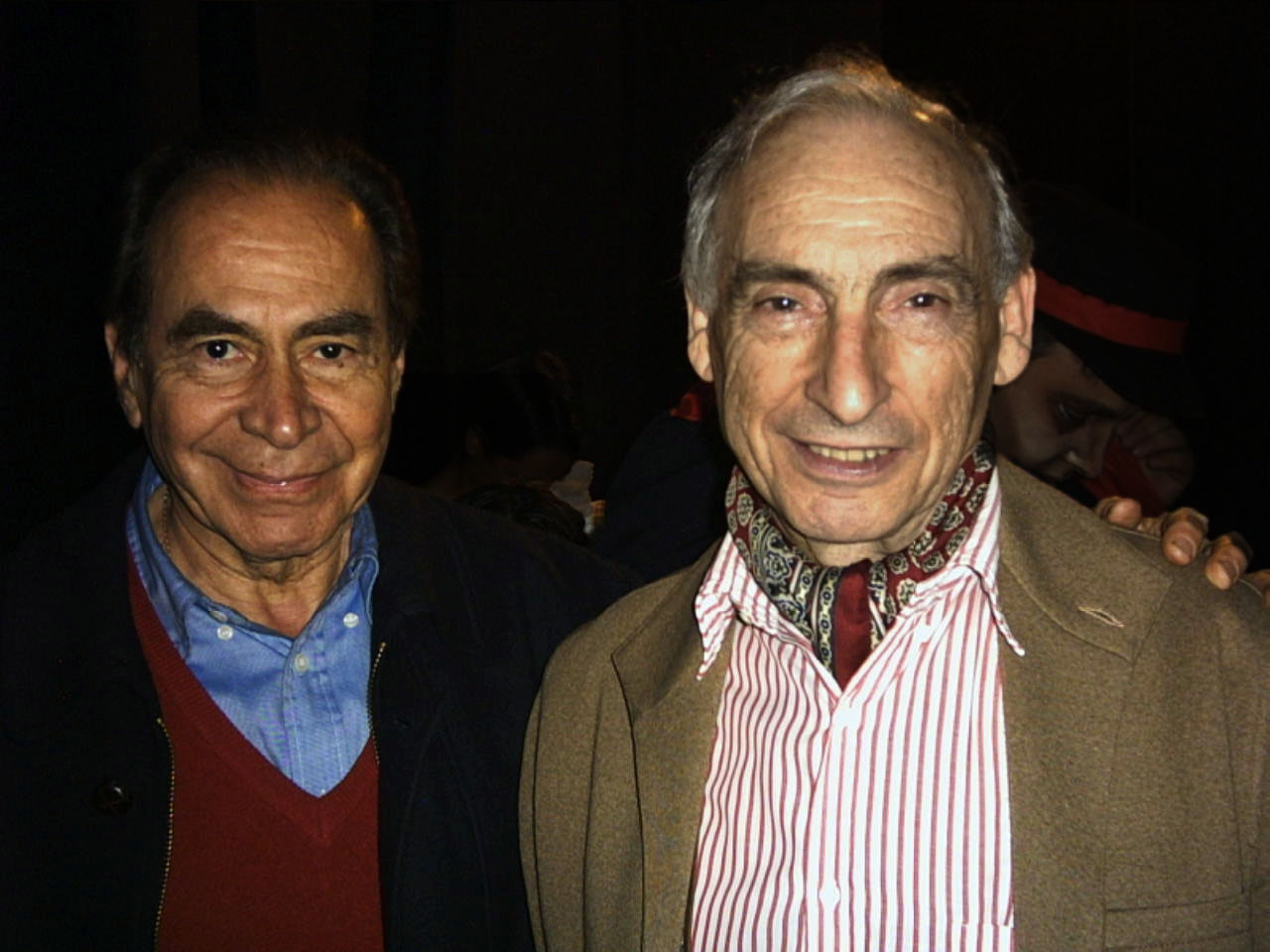
Roberto Escobar and Igón Lerchundi presents La historia de Juan Moreira, Ituzaingó, 2004.

Roberto Escobar (born 1927 in Buenos Aires) and Igón Lerchundi (born 1934 in Basque Country) were pioneers in the art of miming in Argentina and in Latin America. In 1959 they both founded the "Compañía Argentina de Mimos" (Argentine Mime Company) and toured around many countries in America and Europe. They later participated in the First International Pantomime Festival, which took place in Berlin in 1962, along with the most renowned mimes in the world (Marcel Marceau, Kabuki from Tokyo, etc.) Based on their success in this Festival they organized a long tour throughout Europe. At that time they had the opportunity to study in Paris with Etienne Decroux, the creator of 20th-century miming. Throughout their long careers they have obtained innumerable national and international awards. In 1973 they created the "Mimoteatro Escobar-Lerchundi" (Escobar-Lerchundi Mimetheatre), the only theatre dedicated to miming in America and one of the few in the world. Their Miming School is located at this theatre, in the traditional San Telmo district, where they receive students from all over the country and the world.
