= World Mime Day =

World Mime Day (French: Journée Mondiale du Mime) is a worldwide initiative of the World Mime Organisation to celebrate the Art of Mime and non-verbal communication on March 22, the birth date of French mime artist Marcel Marceau. World Mime Day has been celebrated since 2011 in multiple countries, spanning four continents.

World Mime Day is not officially recognized by UNESCO.

== Initiators ==
- Marko Stojanović, a Serbian mime, and president of the World Mime Organisation.
- Ofer Blum, an Israeli mime, and vice-president of the World Mime Organisation.
- Jean Bernard Laclotte, a French mime artist, and co-founder of World Mime Day.

All three are former students of Marcel Marceau.

== History ==
In 2004, World Mime Organisation was officially registered as a non-profit, NGO in Serbia.

In 2007, Marceau died. Blum and Stojanović gravitated towards the idea of establishing the organisation in commemoration.

In April 2011, Laclotte contacted Stojanović with the concept of Journée Mondiale du Mime (World Mime Day), except Laclotte wanted to allot the day on Marceau's death date, September 22 as opposed to March 22. Due to Laclotte’s initiative, the first Journée Mondiale du Mime was celebrated on September 22, 2011. However, Most countries observe the holiday on March 22. Some countries, notably in South America, celebrate it on September 22.

== Celebrations ==
World Mime Day celebrations vary across countries. They are celebrated in these countries as follows:

- Armenia - Yerevan State Pantomime Theatre - Shows
- Bangladesh - Bangladesh Mime Federation - National Mime Fest
- Georgia - Georgian State Pantomime Theatre - Flash mob in the city of Tbilisi
- India - Mime Art & Culture - Artists performing in schools and colleges
- Indonesia - Free Mime Shows
- Poland - Warszawskie Centrum Pantomimy & portal Pantomima Polska.pl - video screenings, book promotions, public discussions
- Slovakia - Divadlo Komika - shows
- Serbia, North Macedonia, Bulgaria, Armenia - Local Wikipedia Chapters with the World Mime Organisation and local mime organizations - World Mime Day Wiki edit-a-thon
- United States - Mime Theatre Studio - workshops
