= Bari Rolfe =

American mime artist, author, educator

- Bari Rolfe
- Born: July 20, 1916; Chicago
- Died: October 19, 2002; Oakland
- Occupation: Mime artist
- Employers: California State University, Northridge; University of California, Los Angeles; University of Washington

Bari Rolfe (July 20, 1916 – October 19, 2002) was an American dancer, choreographer, mime artist, and educator. Rolfe studied mime in Paris, and beginning in the 1960s taught it at University of California, Los Angeles, California State University, Northridge, and University of Washington in Seattle. She wrote several books on mime.

== Early life and education ==
Bari Rolfe was born on July 20, 1916, in Chicago, Illinois. The child of a chiropractor and dress designer, as a child Rolfe studied ballet and performed in nightclubs and vaudeville acts, as well as the Chicago World's Fair. Her family moved to Los Angeles during World War II, and Rolfe continued dancing although her career was temporarily halted when she fell and was injured while performing at the Club Lido.

== Career as a mime and educator ==
In the 1950s Rolfe was living in San Francisco, where she saw a mime performance by Marcel Marceau. This inspired her to travel to Paris and study at Etienne Decroux's school and L'École Internationale de Théâtre Jacques Lecoq. Rolfe returned to the United States, and was teaching classes on mime in 1967 at the San Fernando Valley State College and University of California, Los Angeles.

In the early 1970s Rolfe's articles on mime were appearing in the Los Angeles Times and Chicago Tribune. In 1973 Rolfe served as program coordinator for the first international mime institute to be held in the United States. She authored books on mime and other topics related to theater, and was called the "Grandmother of the American mime world" at the time of her death in 2002.

== Political Life and Activism ==
Rolfe was one of the founders of OWL, the Older Women's League and joined other progressive groups.

== Personal life and death ==
Rolfe lived in the Prudence Crandall House in Oakland, California, from 1977 until her death in 2002. She died of kidney complications.

== Bibliography ==
- Behind the Mask, 1977
- Movement for Period Plays, 1985
- History and Mystery of Mime, 1990
- Actions Speak Louder, 1992
- Mimes on Miming: An Anthology of Writings on the Art of Mime, 1980 (editor)
