= MBAC =

MBAC may stand for:

- Harold Charles International Airport (ICAO: MBAC), Ambergris Cay, Turks and Caicos
- Margolis Brown Adaptors Company, an internationally touring physical theatre company
- Master Bowlers Association of Canada
- Medical and Biomedical Advisory Council
- Mission Bay Aquatic Center, a waterfront community center located in Mission Bay Park, San Diego
- Mohun Bagan Athletic Club
- Museum of Fine Arts (disambiguation), several art museums
