= World Mime Organisation =

Nonprofit organization based in Serbia

The World Mime Organisation (WMO; French: Organisation Mondiale des Mimes, WMM) is a nonprofit organization that promotes the art of mime and nonverbal communication. It was officially registered on January 4, 2004, in Belgrade, Serbia (at that time still the State Union of Serbia and Montenegro).

== History ==
WMO was established by Marko Stojanović, a Serbian actor, professor and mime artist, and Ofer Blum, a mime artist from Israel. Both were students of the Paris International School of Mimodrama Marcel Marceau (Ecole International de Mimodrame da Paris Marcel Marceau) in the early 1990s.

In 1998, Stojanovic organized a tour in Serbia (at that time, the Federal Republic of Yugoslavia) for Ofer Blum. Belgrade, Serbia, was chosen for its headquarters due to the location's low administrative and financial costs. Stojanovic served as the president of the organization and Ofer Blum was the vice-president. The association statutes of the WMO were adopted on April 18, 2011.

== World Mime Day ==
World Mime Day is a World Mime Organisation initiative to celebrate the art of mime and non-verbal communication. It was first observed in 2001 and falls on March 22, the birthday of French mime artist Marcel Marceau. World Mime Day is not officially recognized by UNESCO.

The first Mime Day Wiki Edit-a-Thon was organized in 2016 by the World Mime Organisation, Wikimedia chapters and mime supporters.

== WMO Awards ==
In 2015, the World Mime Organisation established two "Special WMO Awards", one for individuals and the other for institutions. The "Special WMO Award for the Outstanding Contribution to the Art of Mime" is awarded to individuals, and the "Special WMO Award for Promotion and Development of the Art of Mime" is for institutions.

WMO notes that "some of the laureates think of this award as of the Life Achievement Award but [they] believe that even if some of them are in their late 70's, 80's they still have horizons to reach, new heights to achieve and share their art and knowledge with the world. This award is a simple but official way for the international mime community gathered in the World Mime Organisation to say "THANK YOU" to the laureates".

The first laureate in 2015 was Amiran Shalikashvili, a Georgian mime artist and one of the founders of mime in Georgia and the Union of Soviet Socialist Republics (USSR), as well as the founder of the Georgian State Pantomime Theatre. In 2016, the same award was presented to professor Stanislaw Brosowski, a Swedish mime artist of Polish origins and the founder of the Department for Mime Acting at the Stockholm Academy for Dramatic Arts. Other laureates were:

- 2015 Amiran Shalikashvili (Georgia)
- 2016 Stanislaw Brosowski (Sweden)
- 2017 Boris Svidensky (Israel)
- 2017 Andres Valdes (Slovenia)
- 2017 Ella Jaroszewicz (France)
- 2017 Yoram Boker (Israel)
- 2017 Carlos Martínez (Spain)
- 2017 Ivan Klemenc (Serbia)
- 2017 Corinne Soum (France)
- 2018 Velio Goranov (Bulgaria)

Special WMO Award for Promotion and Development of the Art of Mime

The World Mime Organisation (WMO) defines "institutions" broadly, encompassing more than just physical locations. It includes any organized entity, such as theatres, schools, festivals, production companies, or media outlets. The laureates were:

- 2015 Georgian State Pantomime Theatre (Georgia)
- 2016 Yerevan State Pantomime Theatre (Armenia)
- 2017 Pantomimteatern (Sweden)
- 2018 Studio Magenia (France)
- 2018 International Visual Theatre (France)
- 2018 International Festival of Monodrama and Mime (Serbia)
