= Ingemar Lindh =

Swedish theatre director and pedagogue (1945–1997)

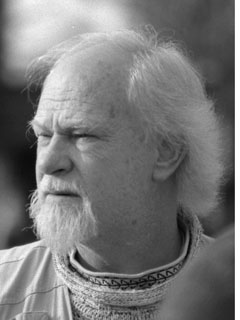
- Lindh c.1997
- Born: Ingemar Willy Lindh; 21 February 1945; Gothenburg, Sweden
- Died: 26 June 1997 (aged 52); Malta
- Occupations: Theatre director and pedagogue

Ingemar Lindh (21 February 1945 – 26 June 1997) was a Swedish theatre director and pedagogue.

== Biography ==
Lindh trained as a dancer at Stora Teatern in Gothenburg and in Stockholm. He attended the drama school Skara Skolscen in Skara from 1964 to 1965 and worked at the Stockholm City Theatre. In 1966 he moved to Paris to train as a mime artist under Etienne Decroux. He also worked as Decroux' assistant.

Returning to Sweden, he founded the theatre company Institutet för Scenkonst, which he directed until his death. He was a guest teacher at the 1981 session of the International School of Theatre Anthropology in Volterra, Italy. The same year he taught at Odin Teatret, Denmark, for a short period of time. From 1984 to 1996 he lived in Pontremoli, Italy, where he directed, in Teatro la Rosa, a School of Theatre.

In 1995 he became a cofounder of the research program xCHA (questioning Human Creativity as Acting), at the University of Malta.

Lindh died on 26 June 1997 in Malta.

== Bibliography ==
- The paper canoe: a guide to theatre anthropology by Eugenio Barba, London, Routledge, 1995
- Pietre di Guado by Ingemar Lindh (original edition) Pontedera, Bandecchi & Vivaldi, 1997
- Stenar att gå på by Ingemar Lindh, Möklinta, Gidlunds förlag, 2003
- Stepping Stones by Ingemar Lindh, Holstebro-Malta-Wroclaw, Icarus Publishing, 2010
