= Daniel Stein (mime) =

Mime artist

Daniel Andrew Stein (born 1952) is an American modern performer of a type of physical theater known as corporeal mime.

== Early years ==
Born in Milwaukee, Wisconsin, Stein studied under Dale Gutzman at Whitefish Bay High School, in suburban Milwaukee. Stein appeared in productions of Peer Gynt, Dracula, The Great Sebastians and Gutzman’s own original musical Flash Gordon. Stein also starred in Gutzman’s original musical tragedy The Gods, a multimedia production based on the life of Jean-Gaspard Deburau, the 19th century French mime who performed in pantomime blanche, so called because of the whiteface the artist wore.

Stein also competed in high school forensic interpretive poetry reading competitions.

== Professional career ==
Stein has taught throughout the world at institutions such as the Juilliard School of Drama, and The Institute of Dramatic Arts, Tokyo. He had his own school in Paris for 15 years. In 2007-08, Stein was a Visiting Guest Artist in Dramatic Arts at Centre College in Danville, Kentucky. From June 2009 until May 2016, he was the Director of Movement and Physical Theatre for the Brown University/Trinity Rep MFA Program in Providence, Rhode Island. Since March 2016, Stein has been a senior lecturer SOE and Director of the BFA Actor Training Program in the Department of Theater and Dance at UC Santa Barbara.

Stein holds dual American and French citizenship.

== Performance history ==
His first solo performance, Timepiece, which deals with the passage of time in the life of a man, and how conflict and power, and subsequently, joy and love emerge from time's progression, has been widely viewed as ushering an era of movement performance into corporeal mime. In Timepiece, the objects on stage are translated from their everyday uses into idealistic symbols. A chair, for example, is no longer just to sit on, but rather also an image of support and strength. This performance is visual music with a beginning, middle and end.

Barton Wimble of the New York Daily News wrote of Timepiece: "Perhaps a handful of times can a critic sit in a theatre and in the space of a mere hour see a performer change the entire course of an established art form, but that is precisely what happened when Daniel Stein opened the Dance Theatre Workshop's 'New Mime Series.'" Sylvie Drake of the Los Angeles Times hailed Timepiece as: "One of those rare revelatory experiences one waits for in the theatre."

== Critical attitude ==
Stein has said this about "physical theater": "I think physical theater is much more visceral and audiences are affected much more viscerally than intellectually. The foundation of theater is a live, human experience, which is different from any other form of art that I know of. Painting, writing, music happen in a mostly interpretive way, which is to say that somebody sits down and writes something and then somebody else interprets it, often in front of a camera. Live theater, where real human beings are standing in front of real human beings, is about the fact that we have all set aside this hour; the sharing goes in both directions. The fact that it is a very physical, visceral form makes it a very different experience from almost anything else that we partake of in our lives. I don’t think we could do it the same way if we were doing literary-based theater."

== Awards ==
Stein has received grants from the National Endowment for the Arts, the United States/Japan Commission, the Pew Charitable Trust and has been named a John Simon Guggenheim Fellow.

Books that mention Stein’s performances include Modern and Post Modern Mime by Thomas Leabhart (Modern Dramatists); From the Greek Mimes to Marcel Marceau and Beyond: Mimes, Actors, Pierrots and Clowns: A Chronicle of the Many Visages of Mime in the Theatre by Annette Bercut Lust (2002) (Scarecrow Press); and Le Theatre Du Geste by Jacques Lecoq (Bordas – Paris).

== See also ==
- Theatre
- Physical theatre
- Corporeal mime
