= Thomas Leabhart =

American corporeal mime

- Born: 1944 (age 80–81); Pennsylvania, United States
- Occupation(s): Mime, teacher, author
- Employer: Pomona College

Thomas Leabhart (born 1944) is an American corporeal mime and corporeal mime teacher.

Leabhart studied at the Ecole de Mime Etienne Decroux, Paris under the instruction of master mime and teacher Etienne Decroux from 1968 to 1972. He currently performs and teaches regularly in France and has performed and taught workshops at the Museum of Design in Zürich, The Austrian Theatre Museum in Vienna, the National Museum of Ethnology in Osaka, the American Center in Montevideo, Movement Theatre International in Philadelphia, and many other venues. He is editor of Mime Journal and has authored over 35 articles. He is resident artist and professor of theatre at Pomona College in Claremont, California, and continues to publish translations of Decroux's writings and methods in English.

Leabhart is the most published writer on the subject of Corporeal Mime—chronicling its rise and development in the modern theatre and is closely associated with the International School of Theatre Anthropology (ISTA). He is also the author of one of the standard works on modern mime, Modern and Post-Modern Mime (Macmillan in London and St. Martin's Press, NYC). In it, Leabhart explains that modern mime, a major creative art form in recent years, has its roots in the work Jacques Copeau did at the Ecole de Vieux-Colombier in Paris in the 1920s. Copeau looked to remedy the 'ills of the theater' by turning to the golden ages of Greek theater, Noh, Kabuki, Elizabethan theatre and Commedia dell'arte. In his classes (one of which, called 'corporeal mime,' inspired Etienne Decroux to develop the mime technique of the same name), Copeau emphasized the expressive potential of the actor's whole body, rather than the voice, hands and face (though his actors trained to use those, as well). Leabhart examines the contributions of Decroux, Jean-Louis Barrault, Marcel Marceau, and Jacques Lecoq to the development of this new form.

== Publications ==
- Leabhart's Mime Journal
- Leabhart's Etienne Decroux (Routledge Performance Practitioners)
