= Pecknold =

Pecknold is a surname. Notable people with the surname include:

- Adrian Pecknold (1920–1999), Canadian mime, director, and author
- Rand Pecknold (born 1967), American ice hockey coach
- Robin Pecknold (born 1986), American singer-songwriter
