= Theatre de l'Ange Fou =

Theatre company based in London

Coordinates: 51.5663°N 0.1225°W

Theatre de l'Ange Fou is a theatre company that primarily focuses on mime, based in London, England. Its artistic directors are Steven Wasson and Corinne Soum. It was created in Paris in 1984 and relocated to London in 1995. It was co-founded with the International School of Dramatic Corporeal Mime, formerly known as the Ecole de Mime Corporel Dramatique, a theatre school that teaches corporeal mime.

== History ==
The Theatre de l'Ange Fou and the International School of Corporeal Mime (formerly known as the Ecole de Mime Corporel Dramatique) were created in Paris in 1984 by Wasson and Soum, the last assistants of Etienne Decroux, "the father of Modern Mime", and relocated to London in 1995. The International School of Corporeal Mime is devoted to the development of the technique, growing repertoire and dramaturgy of Corporeal Mime, and offers a full range of professional training programmes.

For a time, the theatre and company was in a country church in Spring Green, Wisconsin.

The company has toured throughout Europe, Russia, the United States, Canada, Brazil, Mexico and the Middle East. It has created more than 20 original plays, devised pieces as well as adaptations, ranging from duets to large ensemble works: The Little Dictator (parts I & II), Beyond the Garden, Crusade, Entangled Lives, The Government Inspector and The Orpheus Complex.

Using Corporeal Mime as the base of their creative work, the dramaturgical construction of their plays takes the form of a voyage where the characters traverse varied landscapes and lifetimes, some real, some imaginary. The world of the Theatre de l'Ange Fou, this visionary world of contrasting light and darkness, of metamorphosis, is populated by a family of invented archetypes in unknown yet familiar settings. Throughout their various productions, the company explores the infinite possibilities of the interaction between the corporeal score and the spoken text, music and film.

Alongside this personal artistic development, in 1992 Wasson and Soum took up the challenge of re-introducing the repertoire of Etienne Decroux to the public with their reconstruction, and performances by the Theatre de l'Ange Fou, of most of his major pieces (including La Meditation, Les Arbres and L'Usine) in The Man Who Preferred to Stand, and more recently, Passage of Man on Earth and Resonance. This was the beginning of the transmission process that is today the basis of the teaching in the International School of Corporeal Mime.
