= Sport Movies & TV – Milano International FICTS Fest =

Sport Movies & TV – International FICTS Fest
- Location: Milan, Italy
- Founded: 1983
- Language: Italian
- Website: www.sportmoviestv.com

Sport Movies & TV – Milano International FICTS Fest is the world's finals of the World FICTS Challenge, the worldwide championship of cinema, television, and sport culture, organized in sixteen festivals.

The event, as well as its Championship, is organized by the FICTS, chaired by Franco Ascani, member of IOC Culture and Olympic Heritage Commission. Under the slogan "FICTS is Culture through Sport", the 38th edition of "Sport Movies & TV" (the first edition dates back to 1983) will take place in Milan from 15 to 20 November 2017.

== Categories ==
- Olympic Games
- Documentary
- TV Shows – New Technologies
- Sport & Society
- Sport And Disability
- Movies
- Sport Advertisements
- Movies & TV Football

== Awards ==
- Guirlande d'Honneur (one per category)
- Mention d'Honneur (four per category)
- Special prize: Excellence Guirlande d’Honneur for an entry with “a significant role in favour of sport by promoting its image, and cultural and ethical values”.

== Recipients ==
During its history, the festival has awarded many movies and celebrities related to sports, cinema and TV, including:

Celebrities: Pope John Paul II; Franco Baresi; Max Biaggi; Sergey Bubka; Emilio Butraguegno; Fabio Cannavaro; Josè Carreras; Johan Cruijff; Dick Fosbury; Marvin Hagler; Hugh Laurie; Yelena Isimbayeva; Marcello Lippi; Pietro Mennea; Paul Newman; Pelè; Robert Redford; Juan A. Samarach; Martin Scorsese; Andrij Shevchenko; Hristo Stoichkov; Alberto Tomba; Mike Tyson; Alex Zanardi.

Team: Inter F.C; Ferrari.

=== Films Awarded during 2016 Edition ===
- The Skier By Marek Bureš BackLight filma – CZECH REPUBLIC Grass Skiing (Documentary – Individual Sport);
- Glory Game – The Joost Van Der Westhuizen Story By Odette Schwegler Blink Pictures Pty Ltd – South Africa Rugby (Documentary – Team Sport);
- Gino Bartali Il Campione E L'eroe By Antonio Ficarra RAI Radiotelevisione Italiana – Italy Cycling (Documentary – Great Champions);
- Yellow By Alexander Hankoff, Alexander Maxwell Aperture Industries – USA Car Race (Movies);
- Helmet By Alexandre Matias RTP – Radio e Televisão de Portugal – PORTUGer Cycling (Sport Adverts);
- Rings of The World By Sergey Miroshnichenko Ostrov Studio – Russia Winter Olympic Games (Olympic Spirit – Olympic Values);
- Doping – Top Secret: Russia's Red Herrings By Hajo Seppelt ARD German TV (WDR) – Germany Track and Field (Sport & Society).
- Dirty Games By Matthias Frickel Benjamin Best Productions GmbH – Germany Football (Movies & TV Football);
- Lobanovskiy Forever By Anton Azarov Das Boot Production – Ukraine Football (Movies & TV Football – Great Champions);
- The Promise of Winter By Wang Xian, Gao Zeyang Beijing InfoSports.Culture Media Co., Ltd – China Winter Sports (Documentary Short).
