= Stefan Niedziałkowski =

Mime artist

Stefan Niedziałkowski (born 12 March 1945 in Warsaw, Poland) mime artist, author, director, teacher and choreographer.

== History ==
=== Poland ===
In 1964, Stefan was invited by director Henryk Tomaszewski to become member of the Tomaszewski's Wrocław Pantomime Theater. Niedziałkowski acted internationally as part of the company until 1975, before moving on to co-found and co-create “The Stage of Mimes” at The Warsaw Chamber Opera.

=== New York ===
In 1979, Niedziałkowski left Poland and moved to the United States. Upon arrival in New York City, he founded a new mime company with Alice Winslow. Together, they established a school, The American School of Polish Mime. During this time, he authored and directed many works, including "Beret", "Facets", "Fighting with Death", "Pygmalion", and "Time's Sculptures".

=== Philadelphia ===
In 1986, Stefan left New York to join his wife and daughter in Philadelphia, Pennsylvania. During this time, he was frequently invited by Marcel Marceau to teach at Marceau's Ecole Internationale de Mimodrame de Paris Marcel Marceau. In 1993, Niedzialkowski co-wrote, with Jonathan Winslow, a book on the art of mime titled, "Beyond the Word — The World of Mime." Marcel Marceau wrote the foreword to the book, concluding "...Stefan has opened the door with utmost sincerity and integrity, and his contribution is beyond words."

=== Poland ===
In 1993, Niedziałkowski returned to Warsaw, Poland. In 1994, he took the position of artistic director of the Warsaw Pantomime Theater at the State Jewish Theater in Warsaw. Simultaneously, Niedziałkowski founded The Mimes Studio (Studio Mimow) at the Warsaw theater, Teatr Na Woli. From 2000 to 2002 and in 2004 Niedziałkowski was the author and artistic director of The International Mime Art Festival at the Teatr Na Woli theater. In 2005, Stefan Niedziałkowski's Mimes Studio moved to its current location at the Mazovia Region Centre of Culture and Arts in Warsaw.

A celebration commemorating the 50th anniversary of the founding of the Wrocław Pantomime Theatre by Tomaszewski was held in 2006. As a part of the celebration, Stefan Niedziałkowski created, directed, and choreographed his mime drama, “Dusioł” (Soul), for the Wrocław Pantomime Theatre company. Niedziakowski played the title role as a guest artist at the premiere in December 2006 on the Scena Kameralna of the Polish National Opera in Warsaw.

== Today ==
In 2007, the film “Actor of Silence” was created by Tomasz Tarnawski, centering on Stefan Niedzialkowski's life and works. It also features performances from students of the Mimes Studio under Niedziałkowski's direction.
