= Henryk Tomaszewski (mime) =

Mime artist

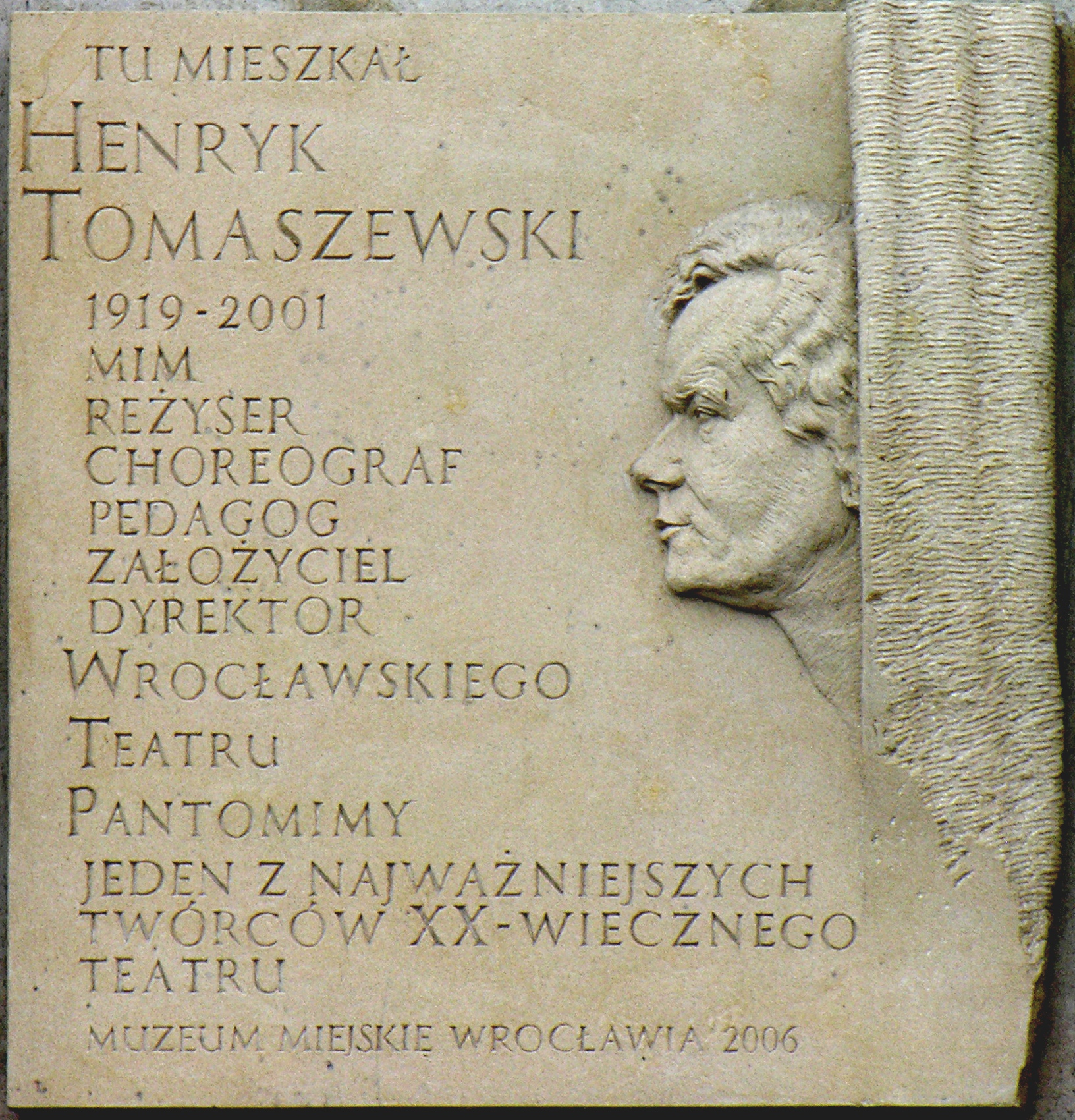
The plaque for Henryk Tomaszewski in Wrocław

Henryk Tomaszewski a.k.a. Heinrich Karl Koenig (20 November 1919 – 23 September 2001) was a Polish mime artist and theatre director.

== Biography ==
Tomaszewski was born in Poznań, Poland. He settled in Kraków in 1945 to study theatre after the end of World War II during which he studied at Iwo Gall's Theatre Studio from 1945 to 1947 and ballet under Feliks Parnell. Tomaszewski left Parnell's company in 1949 and resettled in Wrocław, where he worked as a ballet dancer in the Opera and already there began to develop his own concept of mime.

In 1956, Tomaszewski's Mime Studio had its premiere performance at the Polski Theatre in Wrocław. In 1958, the Mime Studio was renamed the Wroclaw Mime Theatre and was granted the status of State theatre in 1959. Tomaszewski ceased performing in the mid-1960s but continued to direct, train, and choreograph the ensemble and all productions.

Tomaszewski's conceptions of mime technique are modern much in the same way as Etienne Decroux's or Jacques Lecoq's but developed along different lines owing to the differences in Polish and French theatre traditions. Little reference is made to commedia dell'arte traditions.

Notable students and members of his company include Stanisław Brzozowski and Stefan Niedzialkowski.

Tomaszewski's early work is documented in English in "Tomaszewski's Mime Theatre" by Andrzej Hausbrandt (Poland: Interpress, 1975).

Between 1960 and 1966, he collaborated with the Służba Bezpieczeństwa (State Counterintelligence Service), reporting on the activities of his friends and colleagues. He did not receive payment for these activities, and Dr. Sebastian Ligarski, the researcher who discovered the dossier on Tomaszewski in the archives of the Wroclaw IPN (Institute of National Remembrance), conjectures that the service blackmailed him either because of his known homosexual tendencies or with the threat of a ban on foreign travel. The service believed that Tomaszewski, while traveling abroad with his colleagues in the Pantomime Theatre, might discover any contacts with foreign intelligence services.
