= Fédération Internationale Cinéma Télévision Sportifs =

FICTS Federation Internationale Cinema Television Sportifs
- Formation: 10 January 1983; 43 years ago
- Type: International Federation (Sports and Cinema)
- Headquarters: Milan, Italy, Via De Amicis, 17
- Members: 121 Member Countries
- Official language: Italian (main), English, French, Arabic
- President: Franco Ascani
- Website: www.sportmoviestv.com

FICTS (Federation Internationale Cinema Television Sportifs) is the Federation of Sport Televisions and of the images on screen. Founded in 1983, it recognised by the International Olympic Committee (IOC) for which it promotes the values of sport through film and television. 116 countries are members. It is chaired by Franco Ascani (Member of IOC Culture and Olympic Heritage Commission). It is the only international Federation headquartered in Milan.

== Sport Movies and TV – Milano International FICTS Fest ==
FICTS organizes the Sport Movies & TV - Milano International FICTS Fest. It is the world's finals of the "World FICTS Challenge", the Worldwide Championship of Cinema, Television and Sport Culture, organized in 16 festivals across five continents.

== World FICTS Challenge ==
FICTS promotes and organizes the annual Worldwide Championship of Sport, Cinema and Television "WORLD FICTS CHALLENGE" programmed in 16 festivals in five continents. Winning productions of each phase are automatically admitted to the final phase.

== 2017 ==
The phases of the "World FICTS Challenge 2017" are:

Place	Dates
Pokhara (Nepal)	20–21 February
Rotterdam (Netherlands)	6–8 April
Cinefoot (Brazil)	25 – 30 May
Zlatibor (Serbia)	30 June – 4 July
Beijing (China)	10–14 August
Tehran (I. R. Iran)	5–8 September
Côte d'Azur (France)	26–28 September
Liberec (Czech Rep.)	4–6 October
Oaxaca (Mexico)	14–18 June
Barcelona (Spain)	8 – 12 May
Kampala (Uganda)	18–20 July
Sport Memories (Brazil)	16 August – 1 October
Colombo (Sri Lanka)	1–4 September
Tashkent (Uzbekistan)	18–21 September
Lipetsk (Russia)	26–28 September
São Paulo (Brazil)	26–29 October

== 2019 ==
The phases of the "World FICTS Challenge 2019" are:

Place	Dates
Forlì (Italy)	22–24 March
Rabat (Morocco)	28–30 March
Rotterdam (Netherlands)	10–14 April
Côte d'Azur (France)	2–6 June
Barcelona (Spain)	3–9 June
Tehran (I. R. Iran)	23–27 June
Zlatibor (Serbia)	28 June – 1 July
Beijing (China)	9–15 August
Tashkent (Uzbekistan)	9–11 September
Kampala (Uganda)	11–12 September
Kingston (Jamaica)	17–21 September
Rio de Janeiro (Brazil)	24–29 September
Lipetsk (Russia)	2–4 October
Liberec (Czech Rep.)	4–7 October
Buenos Aires (Argentina)	18–20 October
Milan (Italy)	25–30 October

== FICTS "Hall of Fame" ==
FICTS Honorary Members: Thomas Bach; Ching Kuo Wu; Anita DeFrantz; Mario Pescante; Francesco Ricci Bitti; Mohamed Al Fayed.

Celebrities: Pope John Paul II; Franco Baresi; Max Biaggi; Sergey Bubka; Emilio Butraguegno; Fabio Cannavaro; Josè Carreras; Johan Cruijff; Dick Fosbury; Marvin Hagler; Hugh Laurie; Yelena Isinbayeva; Marcello Lippi; Pietro Mennea; Paul Newman; Pelè; Robert Redford; Juan A. Samarach; Martin Scorsese; Andriy Shevchenko; Hristo Stoichkov; Alberto Tomba; Mike Tyson; Alex Zanardi.
