= Familie Flöz =

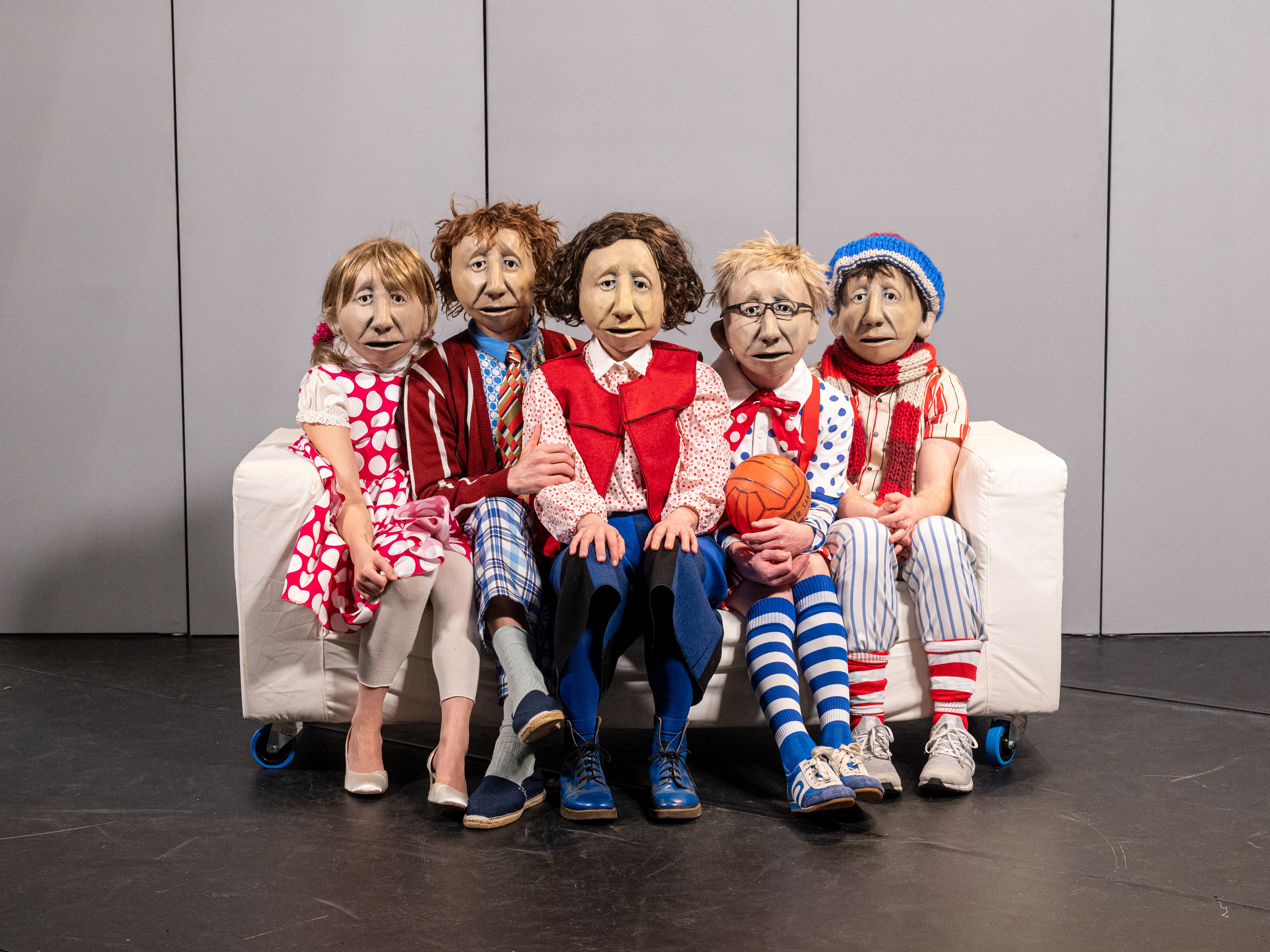
From the play "Hokus Pokus"

Familie Flöz is a German-based theatre company that uses humour, masks, improvisation, mime and physical comedy to create family-friendly shows. The company was begun in 1994 by Hajo Schüler and Markus Michalkowski, acting and mime students at the Folkwang University of the Arts in Essen in the Ruhr Area of Germany, and fellow Michael Vogel joined soon thereafter. Their first production, a comic piece on life on a construction site, premiered at the university in 1994. A few years later, the Familie Flöz performed at the Cologne Comedy Festival and the Kulturbörse Freiburg.

Beginning with its second production, Restaurante Immortale, in 1998, the Familie Flöz gave up using language in its works, instead relying on visuals and music. Familie Flöz productions were hits at both the Edinburgh Festival in 2001 and at the London International Mime Festival. The company first selected the name Flöz Production at the Edinburgh Festival, which later became Familie Flöz. According to The Hindu, “The name is from their first play about undergrounders springing out of a hole in the earth, where mines have veins (floz) of gold.″

Familie Flöz has been based in Berlin since 2001. They have performed in 34 countries. All productions are produced in creative collaboration among the troupe's four members, which now consists of Björn Leese, Benjamin Reber and original members Schüler and Vogel. All the troupe's members have jobs outside the theater, as well. Vogel, who serves as the company's director, explained why the Familie Flöz uses masks: “Masks set the imagination free. The viewer can create his own images undistracted by the actor’s facial expressions. The actor can make the experience richer. The mask is fixed. But as an actor I can make it laugh, cry… and make the audience laugh and cry.”

== Shows ==
- 1996 – Familie Flöz kommt über Tage
- 1998 – Ristorante Immortale the ups and downs of the staff and diners at an Italian restaurant 1995 *2001 – TWO% – happy hour
- 2001 – TWO% – homo oeconomicus
- 2003 – Navigazioni
- 2004 – Teatro Delusio back-stabbing backstage at a theater production
- 2006 – Infinita the marvels and disappointments of the beginning and ending of life.
- 2008 – Hotel Paradiso evil doings at an Alpine resort hotel
- 2010 – Garage D'Or
- 2012 – Garage D'Or (Neuinszenierung)
- 2014 – Haydi!
- 2018 – Dr Nest

== Awards ==
- 2013 – Off Critic Prize, Festival Avignon
- 2012 – Publikumspreis Euro–scene Leipzig
- 2010 – Schwerter Kleinkunstpreis for Hotel Paradiso
- 2008 – Jurypreis Festival Mostra Internacional de Teatro de Ribadavia
- 2008 – Prix du Public, Festival Anjou, Angers
- 2008 – Grand Prix de la Jury, Festival Anjou, Angers
- 2007 –Schwerter Kleinkunstpreis für Teatro Delusio
- 2006 –Prix spécial du Jury, Festival Mimos
- 2004 –AZ Stern München
- 2004 –Tz Rose München
- 2001 –Cavalcade Edinburgh Festival
- 1998 –AZ Stern München
- 1998 –Tz Rose München
- 1996 –Theaterzwang NRW
- 1996 –Hannoverscher Querkunstpreis
- 1995 –Gauklerpreis Koblenz
