= Margolis Brown Adaptors Company =

American physical theatre company

The Margolis Brown Adaptors Company (MBAC) is an internationally touring physical theatre company that creates original, ensemble productions that take an embodied approach to acting, text, song, and unusual use of everyday objects. The company also runs the Margolis Method Center International, which offers in-person and online professional theatre training programs, as well as the Margolis Method Network, an online training platform. Margolis Method, a performance methodology developed by Kari Margolis, is central to the company's creation process and is the foundation of their productions. All MBAC ensemble members are extensively trained in the Method, and have studied with Kari Margolis for years or decades.

MBAC was founded in New York City in 1984 by co-artistic directors Kari Margolis and Tony Brown. The company has since created and produced 18 full-length theatrical productions, along with numerous site-specific works at locations such as the Brooklyn Museum, Coney Island, and the historic John A. Roebling Suspension Bridge on the Delaware River.

The MBAC were artists in residence at the Brooklyn Arts and Culture Association (BACA) in New York City from 1985 to 1990. In 1987 they established an independent performance space and multimedia center in Brooklyn and mounted four original productions there. The company has toured nationally and internationally to Barcelona, Berlin, London, Reus, Singapore and throughout Canada and Mexico. The company relocated to Minneapolis, Minnesota, in 1993. There, under the name Margolis Brown Company, they continued to create and produce multimedia theater productions and trained actors in the Margolis Method for over 12 years. MBAC established an international training center in Highland Lake, New York in 2005, and divided its time between New York and Minneapolis. In 2009, the Company and the Margolis Method Training Center moved all operations to the Highland Lake, NY site.

== Performances ==
MBAC theatrical productions are collaboratively written original performance works produced by the company. Productions are characterized by frequent utilization of multimedia and sparse text, thereby relying on unconventional means of dramatic conveyance. Examples of those alternative dramatic vehicles are projected images, prerecorded or live sound, or an actor's physicality. In addition, the actors often appear in non-representational dramatic situations.

=== Performance History ===
- Autobahn - 1985, BACA, Brooklyn, NY
- The Bed Experiment - 1987, BACA, Brooklyn, NY
- Decodance - 1988, BACA, Brooklyn, NY
- In Search of Planet Eden or Sodom by the Sea - 1989, Coney Island, Brooklyn, NY
- Suite Sixteen - 1990, BACA, Brooklyn, NY
- The Dilemma of Desmodus & Dyphilla - 1991, Arts Awareness, Lexington, NY
- Koppelvision - 1992, St Clement's Church, New York, NY
- Cafe Paradise - 1993, Second Story Theatre, Brooklyn, NY
- Vidpires - 1995, The Southern Theater, Minneapolis, MN
- Vanishing Point - 1996, The Southern Theater, Minneapolis, MN
- The Time of Your Life - 1998, Minnesota Science Museum, Saint Paul, MN
- Starry Messenger - 1999, Children's Theatre Company, Minneapolis, MN
- American Safari - 2000, The Red Eye Theater, Minneapolis, MN
- Sleepwalkers - 2002, The O'Shaugnessy, St Paul, MN
- The Human Show - 2005, Intermedia Arts, Minneapolis, MN
- Cyclopedia - 2008, Illusion Theatre, Minneapolis, MN
- In Search of Tonto Blue - 2010, 7 Stages, Atlanta, GA; Baltimore Theatre Project, Baltimore, MD; Illusion Theatre, Minneapolis, MN
- Pulling Strings, 2012, North American Cultural Laboratory, Highland Lake, NY
- Headshot!, North American Cultural Laboratory, Highland Lake, NY
- Flight, 2024, Provincetown Tennessee Williams Festival, Provincetown, MA

=== Site Specific Events ===
    - American Safari Museum Style, 1984, Brooklyn Museum, Brookyn, NY
    - Suite Sixteen Courtyard, 1988, Brooklyn Museum, Brooklyn, Ny
    - In Search of Planet Eden, or, Sodom By the Sea, 1990, The beach at Coney Island
    - 2005, 1995, Intermedia Arts, Minneapolis, MN
    - The Time Of Your Life, 2000, Science Museum of Minnesota, Saint Paul, MN
    - 360 Degrees, 2005, Roebling Bridge, Minisink Ford, NY
    - Muncha-bunch Brunch, 2006, Roebling View, Minisink Ford, NY
    - Americana And A Place Called Pops, 2021, Minisink Ford, NY

=== Productions Created for Universities ===
    - Vanishing Point, 1996, George Mason University
    - On the Edge Series, 1998-2003, University of Minnesota, Minneapolis, MN
    - The Human Show, 2004, University of Nevada, Las Vegas, NV
    - Deja Vu, 2010, Fort Lewis College, Durango, CO
    - Insula, 2012, Montclair State University, Montclair, NJ
    - The Love Me Knot, 2013, Viterbo University, LaCrosse, WI
    - The Audition, 2014, Millikin University, Decatur, IL
    - Headshot!, 2015, Viterbo University, LaCrosse, WI
    - Headshot!, 2015, Millikin University, Decatur, IL
    - The Islands, 2019, Fabra i Coats, Barcelona, Spain

== Margolis Method ==
Margolis has developed a physically based approach to performance called the Margolis Method. The method, along with 25 years of personal research, takes inspiration from the research of such artists as Etienne Decroux, Bertolt Brecht, and Jerzy Grotowski. The method's goal is to analyze and focus the dramatic force and emotion created by an actor's physicality to further the creative and expressive process. It seeks to empower the actor to work simultaneously as a director, playwright and performer.

The Margolis Method was developed in response to what Margolis saw as a fragmented and ineffective way of teaching actors in America. Pedagogically, Margolis rejected the notion that actor training could be broken down into separate contexts (i.e.: stage "voice" and "movement" classes) and instead suggested that all aspects of actor training are inextricably linked. Rather than focusing primarily on establishing character through developing the character's psychological motivations and emotional states, Margolis sought ways to approach drama and character from a physical perspective as well. To accomplish this, Margolis Method focuses on theatrical notions like conflict, timing, and neutrality and employs concepts borrowed from physics, such as inertia, lines of force and density (as well as concrete manifestations of these principles, such as: pendulums, pulleys and elastics).

=== Residency and Workshops ===
- Master teacher for American College Theatre Festival (2000–2010)

- Actors Movement Studio, New York City, NY
- American College Theater Festival, Region Festivals I, II, V, VIII, IX, USA
- Appalachian State University, Boone, NC
- Arizona State University, Phoenix Fringe Festival, AZ
- Association of Professional Actors and Directors of Catalunya, Barcelona (2010, 2008, 2006)
- Bloomington Arts Center, Bloomington, MN
- Cirque du Soleil, Las Vegas, NV
- Cos International Theatre Festival, Reus, Spain
- Dance Place, Washington, DC
- Fort Lewis College, Durango, CO
- George Mason University, Fairfax, VA
- Guthrie Theater, Minneapolis, MN
- Hunter College, New York, NY
- Institute of Theatre Barcelona, Barcelona, Spain
- Institute of Theatre Terrassa, Terrassa, Spain
- Kennedy Center American College Theater Festival, Washington, DC
- LaGuardia Community College, Queens, NY
- Luther College, Decorah, IA
- Metropolitan State University, Saint Paul, MN
- Millikin University, Decatur, IL
- Minnesota State University Moorhead, Moorhead, MN
- Montclair State University, Montclair, NJ
- Pearl Studios, New York, NY
- Phoenix Fringe, Phoenix, AZ
- Professional Actors and Directors of Catalunya, Barcelona, Spain
- Rhode Island College, Providence, RI
- Ringling Brothers Clown College, WI
- Rocky Mountain Theatre Association Festival, Durango, CO
- Saint Mary's University, Winona, MN
- Siena University, Loudonville, NY
- SITI Company, New York, NY
- Snow College, Ephraim, UT--
- Theatre Mu, Minneapolis, MN
- Towson University MFA Program
- University of Maryland, Baltimore County
- University of Minnesota, Twin Cities, Minneapolis, MN
- University of Missouri Kansas City, Kansas City, MO
- University of Nevada Las Vegas, Las Vegas, NV
- University of North Carolina School of the Arts, Winston-Salem, NC
- University of Oklahoma, Norman, OK
- University of Toronto, Toronto, Ontario, Canada
- University of Windsor, Windsor, Ontario, Canada
- University of Wisconsin–Stevens Point, Stevens Point, WI
- Viterbo University, La Crosse, WI
- Wagner College, Staten Island, NY
- Western Washington University, Bellingham, WA
