= Franco Ascani =

Italian businessman and sports manager

Prof. Franco B. Ascani
- Born: 15 March 1943 (age 83); Rodigo, Italy
- Occupations: sports manager and university professor

Prof. Franco B. Ascani (born 15 March 1943) is an Italian businessman and sports manager. He is the current president of the FICTS (Federation Internationale Cinema Television Sportifs), President of Advisory Board of the Management of Sport and of Sports Events (MASPES) at the University of Milano-Bicocca.

He is a member (the only Italian) of the Culture and Olympic Heritage Commission.

== Recognition ==
- 1978 he has been awarded, by Sandro Pertini (former-Italian Republic President, of the title of the “Republic Knight”.
- 1978 “Star of bronze to the sport merit of the NOC” (Giulio Onesti President).
- 1983 “Star of silver to the sport merit of the NOC”. (Franco Carraro President).
- 1983 “Oak to the merit of 1st degree” of the Federatletica (Primo Nebiolo President).
- 1987 “Oak to the merit of 2nd degree” of Federatletica (Primo Nebiolo President).
- 1989 “Gold Ambrogino”, official merit of the Municipality of Milan.
- 1989 “Silver Plate” IAAF for the World Marathon Cup.
- 1991 “Biscione d’oro” from APT Milano
- 1995 “Follaro d’oro internazionale” for the Cinema and the sport Television.
- 1996 “Guirlande d' Honneur” for the sports Cinema and TV
- 1997 “Diploma of Honour” of the Olympic International Academy
- 2001 “IOC Award” for Voluntary service Year” (Juan A. Samaranch President).
- 2004 “International Olympic Committee Award” (Olympic Games Athens)
- 2005 “USSI Plate” - “The gold pen of the sport”
- 2007 “Oak to the Merit of 3rd degree” of the Federatletica (Franco Arese President).
- 2010 “Star of Gold to the sport merit of the Italian NOC” (Gianni Petrucci President).
- 2011 “Gold Medal” by Province of Milano
- 2013 “Gianni Brera Award”
- 2014 “Diploma of Excellent Press Office” by National Journalist Federation
- 2015 “Honorary Degree” with the title of “International Honorary Doctorate” in Philosopia by the USSA - United States Sports Academy, America's Sports University, the most important Master Sport Academy of United States of America.
