= Adam Darius =

Turkish origin American dramatist

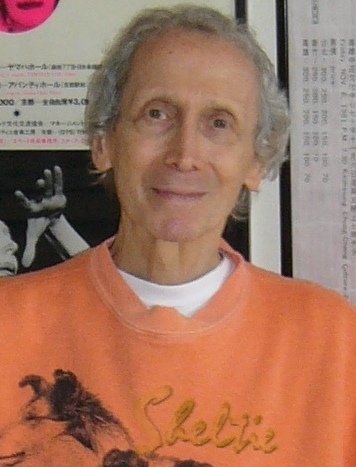
Adam Darius: Helsinki, 2007.

Adam Darius (né Hervey Krefetz, 10 May 1930 – 3 December 2017) was a Turkish origin American dancer, mime artist, writer and choreographer. As a performer, he appeared in over 86 countries across six continents. As a writer, he published 19 books and wrote 22 plays.

In a program devoted to his career, the BBC World Service described him as "one of the most exceptional talents of the 20th century".

== Biography ==
Adam Darius was born in Manhattan, New York City, into a family of Turkish and Russian ancestry.

=== Ballet career ===
Adam Darius began his ballet and contemporary dance training in 1945, at the age of 14, and went on to study with, among others, Anatole Oboukhov, George Goncharov, Olga Preobrajenska and José Limón.

His professional career began in 1946 with appearances at New York's Metropolitan Opera House, and then with numerous ballet companies including Britain's International Ballet (1953), Canada's Royal Winnipeg Ballet (1954), and Denmark's Scandinavian Ballet (1962). He was also choreographer of the Israel National Opera (1963–1964), where he choreographed four operas for opera star Plácido Domingo; (Don Giovanni, Carmen, La Traviata and The Pearl Fishers, all of which premièred at the Israel National Opera in Tel-Aviv in 1963). From 1964 to 1966, Adam Darius was the director of his own company, the Israeli Ballet.

Principal ballets:

- Pierrot the Wanderer - Choreographed for American prima ballerina Melissa Hayden and premièred at the Canadian Broadcasting Corporation (CBC) in Toronto, Canada in 1955.
- Quartet - Choreographed for American prima ballerina Cynthia Gregory and premièred at the San Gabriel Mission Playhouse, California in 1958.
- The Anne Frank Ballet - Premièred in Long Beach, California in 1959. Produced for Italian Television in 1967. Released as a video in 1989, in which Mr Darius danced the role of Anne Frank's father, Otto Frank.
- Marilyn - A ballet based on the life of Marilyn Monroe, which ran for five weeks at the Arts Theatre in London's West End in February 1975.
- Firebird - Choreographed to Stravinsky's music. Presented by the Las Vegas Civic Ballet at the Reed Whipple Cultural Center, Las Vegas, in April 1986.

=== Expressive mime ===
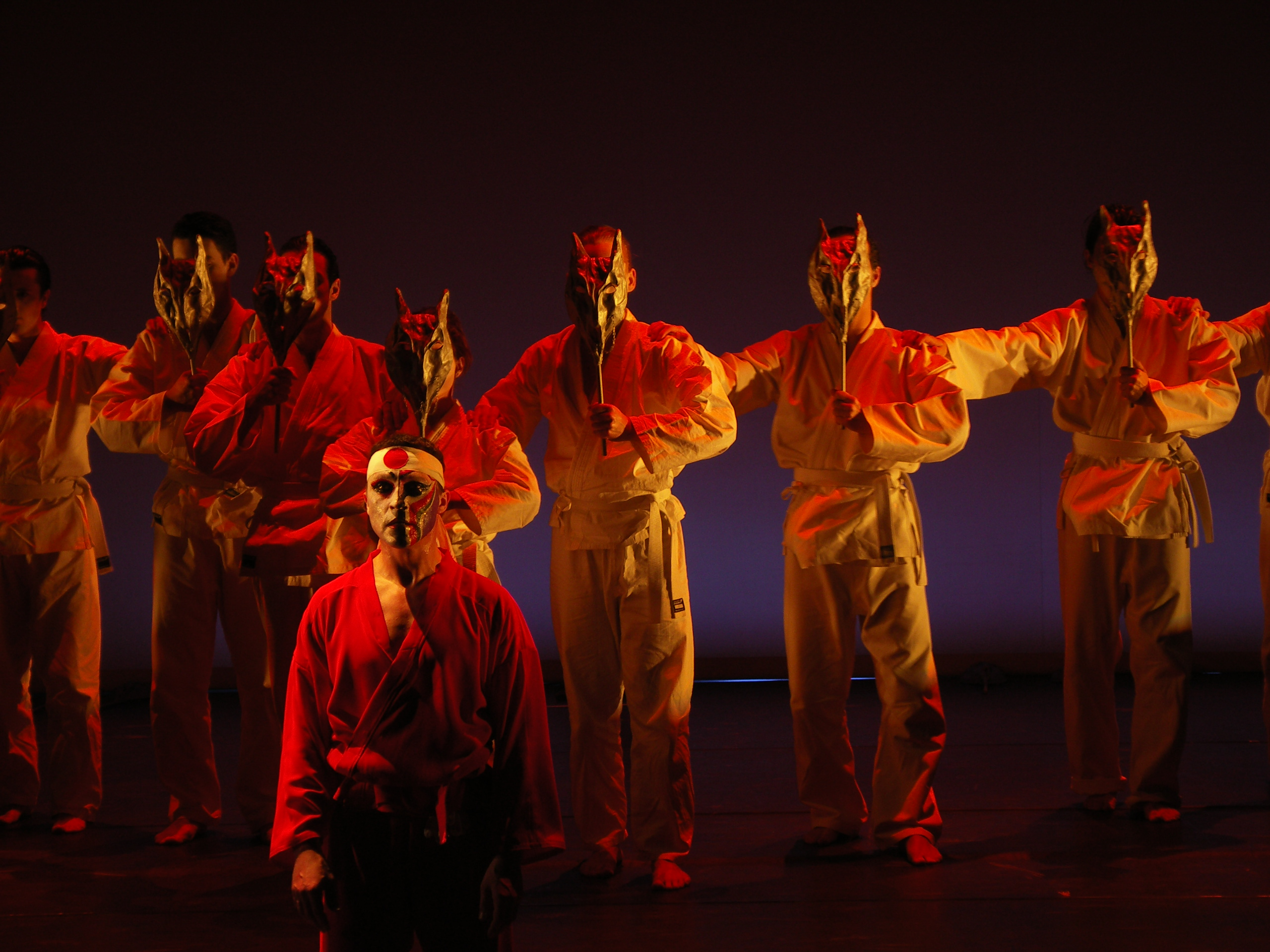
Yukio Mishima, Portugal 2006: by Adam Darius and Kazimir Kolesnik.

In 1967, Adam Darius broke away from the traditional world of ballet and premièred his own fusion of dance and mime, described as 'expressive mime', at the Spoleto Festival in Italy and at the Arts Lab in London.

In the years that followed he toured many countries, including: South Africa (1970); the Soviet Union (1971); the Philippines, Papua New Guinea and Australia (1971); Syria, Iran and Afghanistan (1976); Japan (1984); and Greenland (1998).

Adam Darius' concept of physical theatre was also realized in the London productions of Yukio Mishima (1991), Rimbaud and Verlaine (1992) and Tower of Babel (1993), in collaboration with Kazimir Kolesnik. Among their further joint productions was A Snake in the Grass, presented in Amman, Jordan (2001) and acknowledged with the Noor Al Hussein Award.

=== Teaching ===
In 1978, Adam Darius and Marita Crawley founded the Mime Centre in London. In Britain he taught, among others, mime artist, dancer and director, Kazimir Kolesnik, rock star Kate Bush, Hollywood film star Kate Beckinsale, and West End principal Warren Mitchell.

== Death ==
Darius died on 3 December 2017 in Espoo, Finland at the age of 87.

== Books by Adam Darius ==
Author	#	Year	Title	Pages	Publisher	City	ISBN	Genre
Darius, Adam	1	1973	Dance Naked in the Sun	325	Latonia Publishers	London	ISBN 0-9502707-0-9	Autobiography
Darius, Adam	2	1978	The Way to Timbuktu	276	Latonia Publishers	London	ISBN 0-9502707-1-7	Autobiography
Darius, Adam	3	1984	The Adam Darius Method	270	Latonia Publishers	London	ISBN 0-9502707-2-5	Theatre technique
Darius, Adam	4	1988	The Man Who Spat at Fate	251	Latonia Publishers	London	ISBN 0-9502707-3-3	Novel
Darius, Adam	5	1991	The Guru	115	Latonia Publishers	London	ISBN 0-9502707-4-1	Philosophy
Darius, Adam	6	1996	The Commedia Dell' Arte	97	Kolesnik Production OY	Helsinki	ISBN 952-90-7188-4	Theatre technique
Darius, Adam	7	1998	Acting - A Psychological and Technical Approach	208	Kolesnik Production OY	Helsinki	ISBN 952-90-9146-X	Theatre technique
Darius, Adam	8	2000	Audition Monologues	128	Kolesnik Production OY	Helsinki	ISBN 951-98232-0-4	Theatre technique
Darius, Adam	9	2003	Double Existence	202	Kolesnik Production OY	Helsinki	ISBN 951-98232-1-2	Novel
Darius, Adam	10	2004	A Nomadic Life	250	Kolesnik Production OY	Helsinki	ISBN 951-98232-2-0	Autobiography
Darius, Adam	11	2005	When Your Dog Dies	63	Kolesnik Production OY	Helsinki	ISBN 951-98232-3-9	Animal Welfare
Darius, Adam	12	2007	Arabesques Through Time	407	Harlequinade Books	Helsinki	ISBN 951-98232-4-7	Autobiography
Darius, Adam	13	2009	Death in Damascus	n/a	e-book	n/a	ISBN 978-952-92-5476-7	Novel
Darius, Adam	14	2011	The Passion of Black Jesus	n/a	e-book	n/a	ISBN 978-952-92-6752-1	Novel
Darius, Adam	15	2012	Dancing in the Himalayas	n/a	e-book	n/a	ISBN 978-952-93-0126-3	Novel
Bocher, Barbara with Darius, Adam	16	2012	The Cage: Dancing for Jerome Robbins and George Balanchine, 1949-1954	288	CreateSpace	n/a	ISBN 978-147-82-4658-9	Autobiography
Darius, Adam	17	2013	La Belle Otero: The Last of the Great Courtesans	n/a	e-book	n/a	ISBN 978-952-93-0129-4	Play
Darius, Adam	18	2014	Poems by Adam Darius	n/a	e-book	n/a	ISBN 978-952-68163-0-2	Poetry
Darius, Adam	19	2014	Ballet Babylon	n/a	e-book	n/a	ISBN 978-952-93-2607-5	History

== Honours and awards ==
- 1976: Silver medallion of the Belgrade Monodrama Festival (Yugoslavia)
- 1976: Honorary membership of the North Sumatran Community (Indonesia)
- 1978: American Television Emmy (US)
- 1984: Premio Positano Léonide Massine Per L'arte Della Danza (Italy)
- 1987: Key to the City of Las Vegas (US)
- 1998: Shetland Dance and Mime Award (UK)
- 2001: Noor Al Hussein Foundation Award (Jordan)
- 2002: Beirut Festival du Rire Trophy (Lebanon)
- 2003: Noor Al Hussein Foundation Award (Jordan)
- 2009: Order of Luis Manuel Gutiérrez (Venezuela)
- 2012: Ministerio del Poder Popular para la Cultura Award (Venezuela)
- 2014: Gjakova Komedia Fest Appreciation Award (Republic of Kosovo)
- 2016: Simon Bolívar Award (Venezuela)

== International performances since January 2000 ==
Unless marked as being a SOLO performance, all shows were given in partnership with Kazimir Kolesnik.

Year	Month	Country	City	Venue	Repertoire	Notes
2000	April	Jordan	Amman	Royal Cultural Centre	Resurrection	
2000	July	Croatia	Dubrovnik	Dubrovnik Festival	Resurrection	
2000	August	Finland	Oulu	Oulu Music Festival Theatre	Pierrot in Exile	
2000	Nov.	Turkey	Istanbul	Atatürk Cultural Center	Selected solos	SOLO
2001	Jan/Feb	Jordan	Amman	Baccalaureate School Theatre	A Snake in the Grass	
2001	April	Turkey	Istanbul	Aksanat Cultural Centre	Resurrection	
2001	Sept.	Morocco	Casablanca	International Theatre Festival	Resurrection	
			Rabat	Salle Bahnini	Resurrection	
2001	Nov.	Finland	Helsinki	Q-Teatteri	James Dean	As director
2002	June	Slovakia	Bratislava	Pantomime Festival	Death of a Scarecrow	
2002	July	Lebanon	Beirut	Festival du Rire	Highlight repertoire	
2003	Feb.	Russia	St. Petersburg	Okryty Theatre	Highlight repertoire	
2003	May	Italy	Turin	Teatro Gobetti	Death of a Scarecrow	
2003	Sept.	Jordan	Amman	Royal Cultural Centre	Death of a Scarecrow	
2004	March	New Zealand	Christchurch	Hagley Community College	Death of a Scarecrow	
2004	April	Malaysia	Kuala Lumpur	Malaysian National Theatre	Death of a Scarecrow	
2004	August	Malta	Valletta	Saint James Cavalier Centre	Death of a Scarecrow	
2004	Nov.	Syria	Damascus	Al-Kabbani Theatre	Death of a Scarecrow	
2005	Feb.	Syria	Damascus	Finnish/Jordanian Festival, Al-Assad Opera House	Fusion	With company
2005	August	Turkey	Istanbul	Sultan's Palace	Death of a Scarecrow	
2006	Feb.	Portugal	Porto	Serralves Foundation	Yukio Mishima	With company
			Ponte del Lima	Teatro Diogo Bernardes	Yukio Mishima	With company
2006	May	Ukraine	Kyiv	TYS Theatre; Suzirie Theatre	Death of a Scarecrow	
2006	Dec.	Argentina	Rosario	Teatro del Rayo; Centro Cultural Lavarden	Death of a Scarecrow	
2007	Oct.	Armenia	Yerevan	High Fest Theatre Festival	Death of a Scarecrow	
2007	Dec.	Macedonia	Skopje	Macedonian Academy of Science and Arts	Dance: A Bridge between Cultures	UNESCO sponsored lecture
2008	Feb.	Egypt	Alexandria	Bibliotheca Alexandrina	Tears of a Clown	
2009	Jan.	Finland	Espoo	Sellosali	Death of a Scarecrow	
2009	March	Macedonia	Skopje	Macedonian National Theatre	Death of a Scarecrow	
2009	Oct.	Venezuela	Isla de Margarita	Teatro Simon Bolivar	Selected solos	SOLO
2009	Nov.	Finland	Espoo	Sellosali	Tears of a Clown	
2010	May	Bosnia & Herzegovina	Sarajevo	Teaterfest	Death of a Scarecrow	
2010	Nov.	Nepal	Kathmandu	Kathmandu International Theatre Festival	Basho - A Windswept Spirit	
2012	May	Venezuela	Caracas	Teresa Carreño Cultural Complex	Basho - A Windswept Spirit	
			Caracas	Sala Juana Sujo	Basho - A Windswept Spirit	
			Caracas	Teatro Principal	Basho - A Windswept Spirit	
2013	March	Kuwait	Kuwait City	Dar al Athar al-Islamiyyah	Basho - A Windswept Spirit	
2013	Oct	Macedonia	Skopje	Macedonian National Theatre	Basho - A Windswept Spirit	
2014	Sept	Republic of Kosovo	Gjakova	Gjakova Comedy Festival	Basho - A Windswept Spirit	
2015	March	Kuwait	Kuwait City	Royal Palace	Basho - A Windswept Spirit	
2015	Dec.7	Russia	Krasnoyarsk	Palace of Culture	Basho - A Windswept Spirit	
2015	Dec.8	Russia	Novosibirsk	Philharmonic Chamber Hall	Basho - A Windswept Spirit	
2015	Dec.10	Russia	Chelyabinsk	Prokoviev Concert Hall	Basho - A Windswept Spirit	
