= Adrian Pecknold =

Mime artist

Adrian Pecknold (1920–1999) was a Canadian mime, director, and author of the book Mime: The Step Beyond Words. He is popularly known for his creation and depiction of Poco the Clown in the popular Canadian children's television program Mr. Dressup.

Pecknold studied mime at L'École Jacques Lecoq in Paris from October 1962 to April 1963. Following this, he joined Toronto Workshop Productions as an actor and instructor of mime.

Pecknold played the role of Lucky in Samuel Beckett's play Waiting for Godot (1964) on the CBC anthology series Festival. He also appeared in the Festival episode Juno and the Paycock (1965), adapted from the play by Seán O'Casey.

In 1968, he founded Canada's first professional mime company, the Canadian Mime Theatre, in Niagara-on-the-Lake. In 1974 he began the Canadian Mime School, the first Canadian professional mime school. From 1982 to 1988 he taught at the University of Guelph, and from 1982 to 1999 he taught at the Ryerson Theatre School, Ryerson Polytechnical Institute, in Toronto, Ontario, Canada.

== Awards and honors ==
Pecknold was awarded the Queen's Silver Jubilee Medal in 1977 in recognition of his contribution to theatre and theatre education in Canada.
