= Mime artist =

Person who uses mime as a theatrical medium or performance art

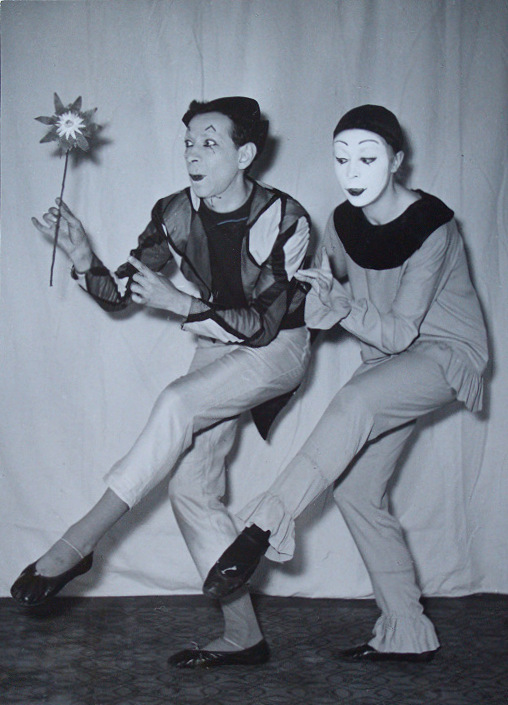
Mime artists Jean Soubeyran and Brigitte Soubeyran in 1950

A mime artist, or simply mime (from Greek μῖμος, mimos, "imitator, actor"), is a kind of performer who uses mime (also called pantomime), by acting or entertaining through the use of body motions without speech, as a theatrical medium or as a performance art.

== History ==
=== Ancient Greece and Rome ===
The performance of mime originates at its earliest in Ancient Greece; the name is taken from a single masked dancer called Pantomimus, although performances were not necessarily silent. The first recorded mime was Telestēs in the play Seven Against Thebes by Aeschylus. Tragic mime was developed by Puladēs of Kilikia; comic mime was developed by Bathullos of Alexandria. Mime (mimus) was an aspect of Roman theatre from its earliest times, paralleling the Atellan farce in its improvisation (if without the latter's stock characters). It gradually began to replace the Atellanae as interludes [embolium] or afterpieces (exodium on the main theatre stages; became the sole dramatic event at the Floralia in the second century BC; and in the following century received technical advances at the hands of Publilius Syrus and Decimus Laberius, who used expressions, situations and titles of Plautus' comedies. Under the Roman Empire mime became the predominant Roman drama, but experienced mixed fortunes under various emperors. Trajan banished mime artists; Caligula favored them; Marcus Aurelius made them priests of Apollo. Nero himself acted as a mime. The mime was distinguished from other dramas by its absence of masks, and by the presence of female as well as male performers. A mime called the archimime (archimimus) would perform as a part of Roman funeral processions by miming the deeds of the deceased. Mime stock characters included the stooge or stupidus, the gigolo, and cultus adulter in the mimus zelotypi or jealous mime.

=== Medieval Europe ===
In medieval Europe, early forms of mime such as mummer's plays and later dumbshows evolved.

=== France ===
In early nineteenth-century Paris, Jean-Gaspard Deburau solidified the many attributes that have come to be known in modern times—the silent figure in whiteface. Jacques Copeau, strongly influenced by commedia dell'arte and Japanese Noh theatre, used masks in the training of his actors. His pupil Étienne Decroux was highly influenced by this, started exploring and developing the possibilities of mime, and developed corporeal mime into a highly sculptural form, taking it outside the realms of naturalism. Jacques Lecoq contributed significantly to the development of mime and physical theatre with his training methods. As a result of this, the practice of mime has been included in the list of Intangible Cultural Heritage elements in France since 2017.

=== Asian theatre ===
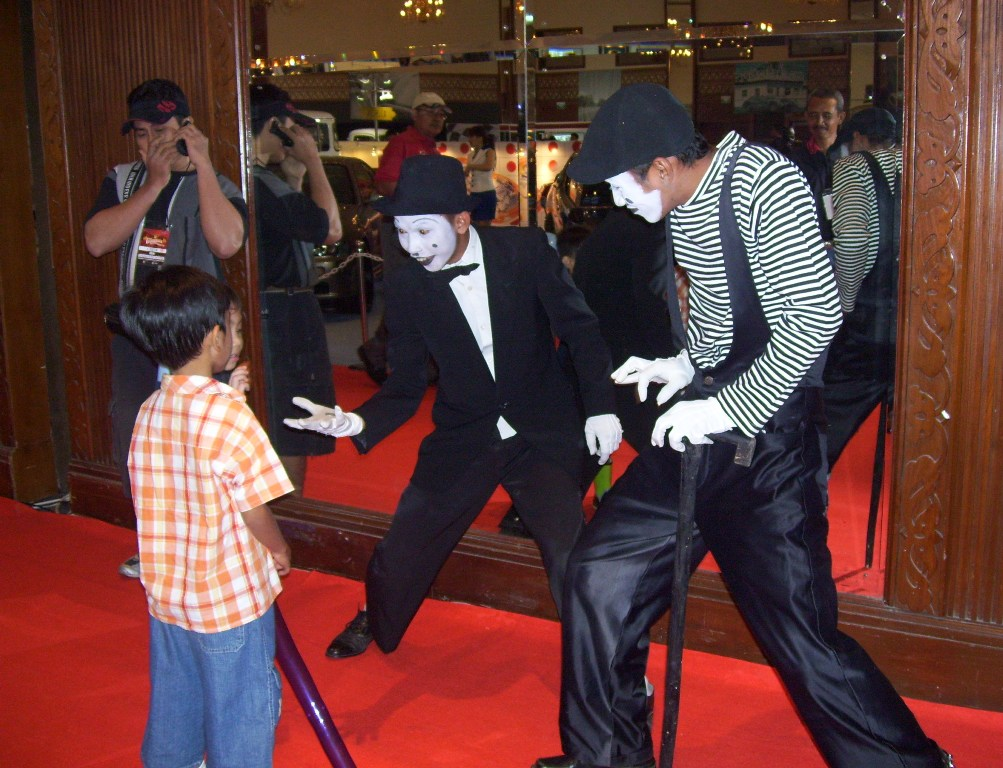
Two mime artists playing with children in Indonesia.

Classical Indian musical theatre is a group of theatrical forms in which the performer presents a narrative via stylized gesture, an array of hand positions, and miming to play different characters, actions, and landscapes. Recitation, music, and even percussive footwork sometimes accompany the performance. The Natya Shastra, an ancient treatise on theatre by Bharata Muni, mentions silent performance, or mukabhinaya. In Kathakali, stories from Indian epics are told with facial expressions, hand signals and body motions. Performances are accompanied by songs narrating the story while the actors act out the scene, followed by actor detailing without background support of narrative song.. The Japanese Noh tradition has greatly influenced many contemporary mime and theatre practitioners including Jacques Copeau and Jacques Lecoq because of its use of mask work and highly physical performance style. Butoh, though often referred to as a dance form, has been adopted by various theatre practitioners as well.

== Formats ==
=== In film ===
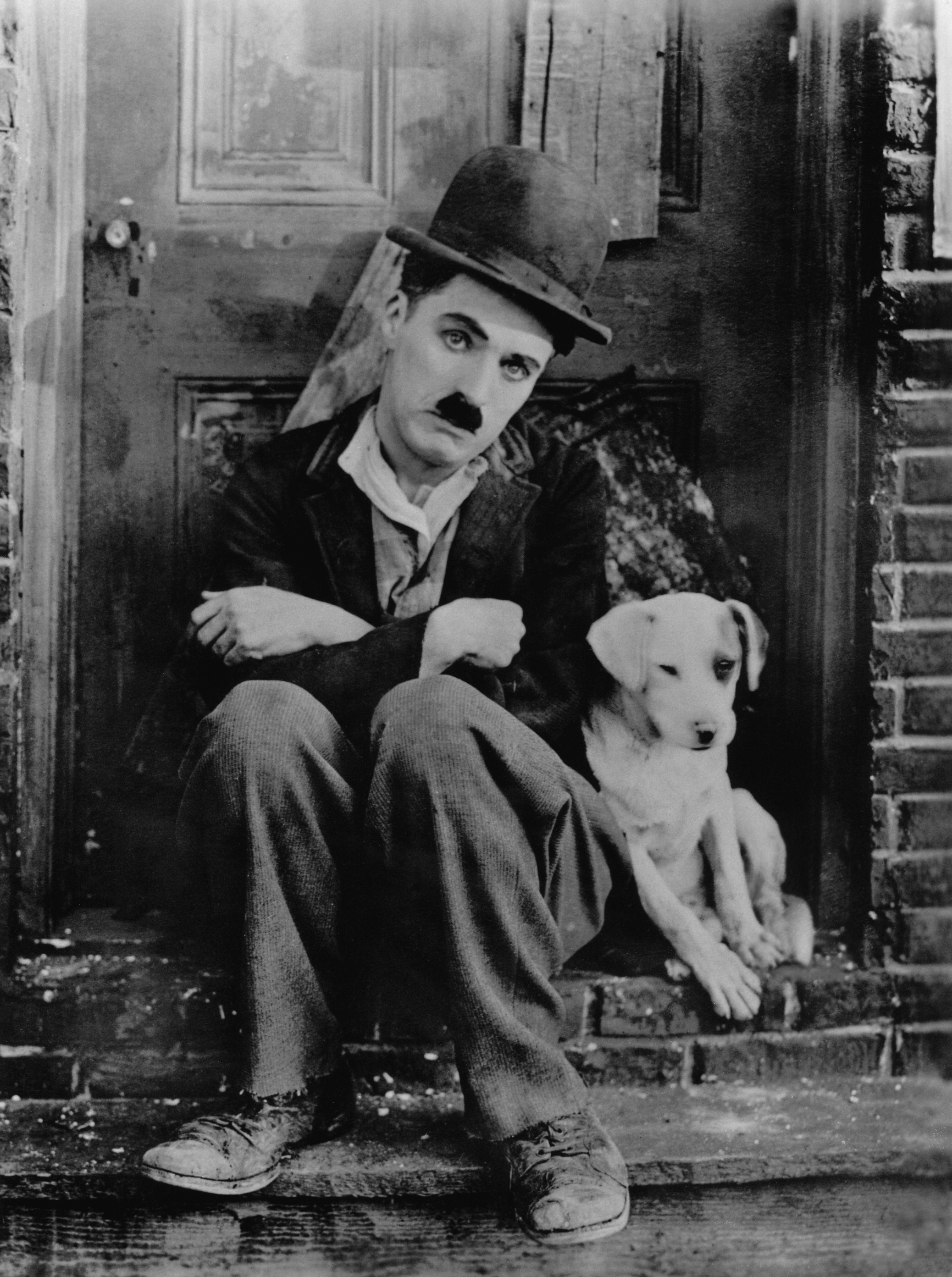
A Dog's Life (1918), Charlie Chaplin

Before the work of Étienne Decroux there was no major treatise on the art of mime, and so any recreation of mime as performed prior to the twentieth century is largely conjecture, based on interpretation of diverse sources. However, the twentieth century also brought a new medium into widespread usage: the motion picture. The restrictions of early motion picture technology meant that stories had to be told with minimal dialogue, which was largely restricted to intertitles. This often demanded a highly stylized form of physical acting largely derived from the stage. Thus, mime played an important role in films prior to advent of talkies (films with sound or speech). The mimetic style of film acting was used to great effect in German Expressionist film. Silent film comedians like Charlie Chaplin, Harold Lloyd, and Buster Keaton learned the craft of mime in the theatre, but, through film, they had a profound influence on mimes working in live theatre decades after their deaths. Indeed, Chaplin may be the best-documented mime in history. Harpo Marx, of the Marx Brothers comedy team, continued the mime tradition in the sound film era, his silent persona working in counterpoint to the verbal comedy of his brothers Groucho and Chico. The famous French comedian, writer, and director Jacques Tati achieved his initial popularity working as a mime, and his later films had only minimal dialogue, relying instead on many subtle expertly choreographed visual gags. Tati, like Chaplin before him, would mime out the movements of every single character in his films and ask his actors to repeat them.

=== On stage and street ===
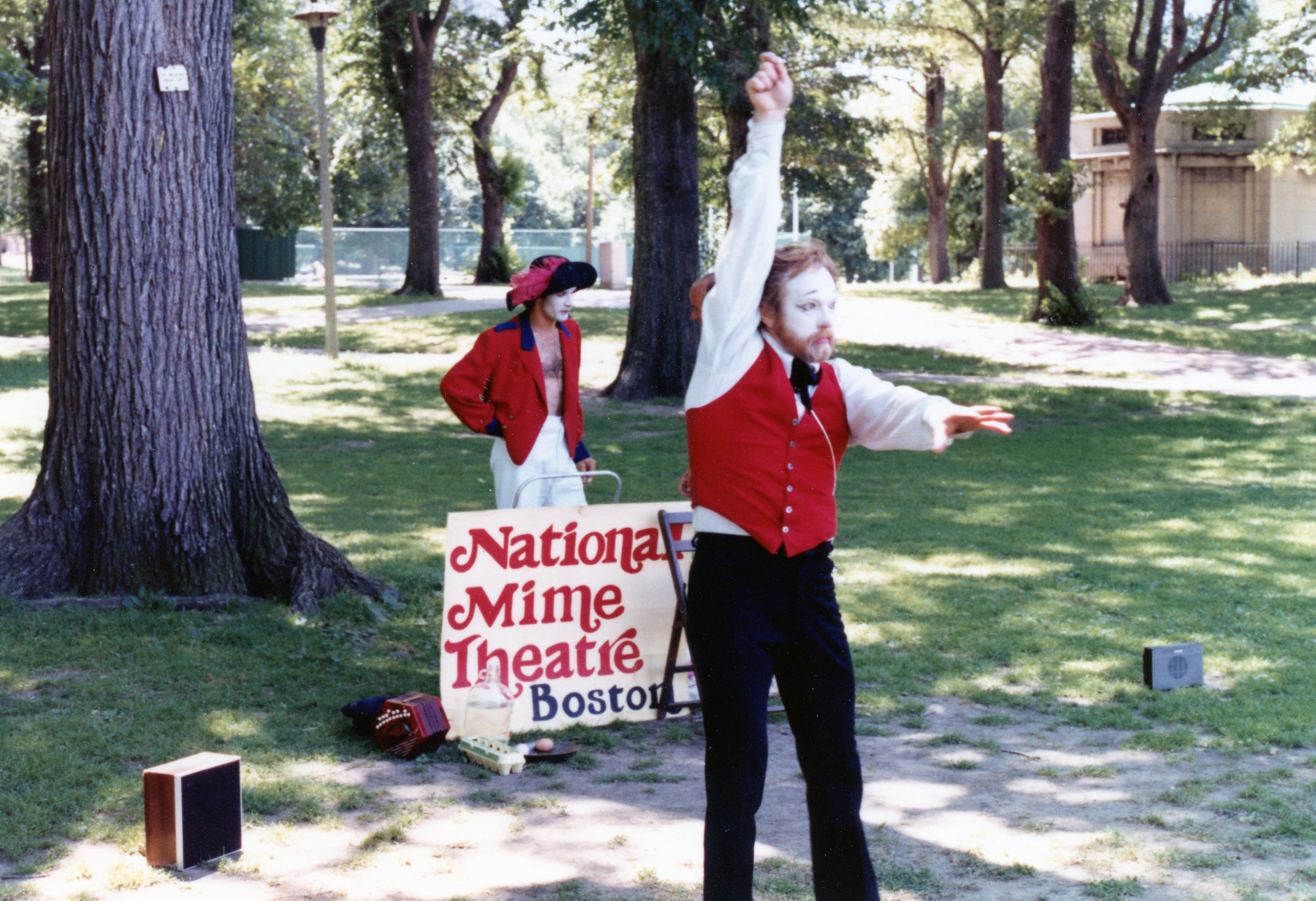
Whitefaced mime on Boston Common in 1980

Mime has been performed on stage, with Marcel Marceau and his character "Bip" being the most famous. Mime is also a popular art form in street theatre and busking. Traditionally, these sorts of performances involve the actor/actress wearing tight black and white clothing with white facial makeup. However, contemporary mimes often perform without whiteface. Similarly, while traditional mimes have been completely silent, contemporary mimes, while refraining from speaking, sometimes employ vocal sounds when they perform. Mime acts are often comical, but some can be very serious.

=== In literature ===
Canadian author Michael Jacot's first novel, The Last Butterfly, tells the story of a mime artist in Nazi-occupied Europe who is forced by his oppressors to perform for a team of Red Cross observers. Nobel laureate Heinrich Böll's The Clown relates the downfall of a mime artist, Hans Schneir, who has descended into poverty and drunkenness after being abandoned by his beloved.

== List of mime artists ==
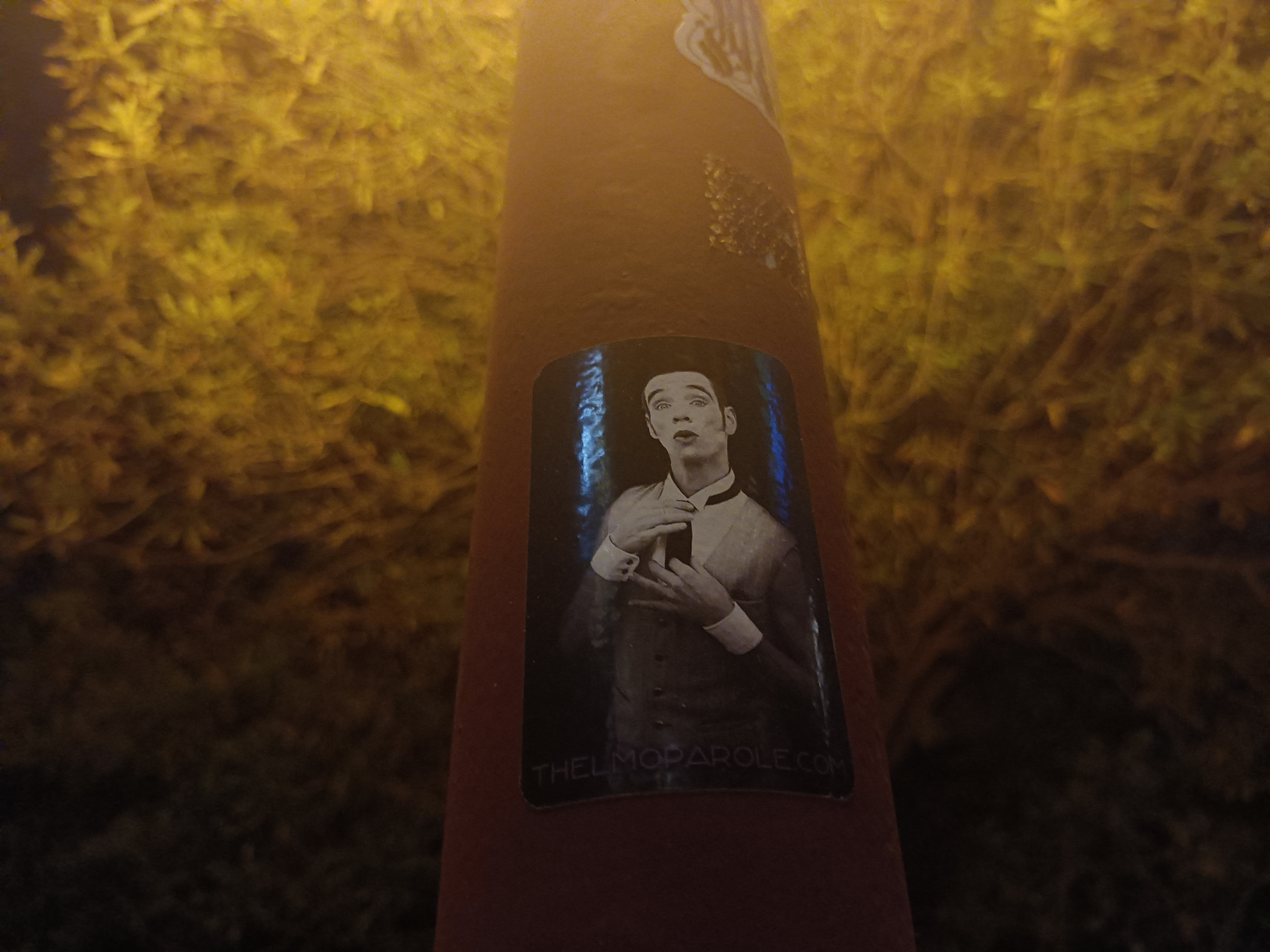
Mime artist Thelmo Parole on sticker art. Sydney 2025

- Rowan Atkinson
- Steven Banks
- Jean-Louis Barrault
- Blue Man Group
- Wolfe Bowart
- David Bowie
- Tony Brown
- Charlie Chaplin
- Michel Courtemanche
- Adam Darius
- Jean-Gaspard Deburau
- Étienne Decroux
- Ryan Drummond
- Jogesh Dutta
- Ladislav Fialka
- Dario Fo
- George L. Fox
- Chris Harris (actor, director and writer)
- Benny Hill
- Bill Irwin
- Alejandro Jodorowsky
- Doug Jones
- Buster Keaton
- Lindsay Kemp
- Stan Laurel
- Thomas Leabhart
- Grigory Gurevich
- Jacques Lecoq
- Paul Legrand
- Tina Lenert
- Partha Pratim Majumder
- Marcel Marceau
- Ennio Marchetto
- Kari Margolis
- Carlos Martínez
- Harpo Marx
- Irene Mawer
- Samy Molcho
- Tony Montanaro
- Mummenschanz
- Stefan Niedziałkowski
- Adrian Pecknold
- Lenka Pichlíková-Burke
- Slava Polunin
- Oleg Popov
- Nola Rae
- Bari Rolfe
- Gene Sheldon
- Richmond Shepard
- Shields and Yarnell
- Red Skelton
- Steam Powered Giraffe
- Daniel Stein
- Marko Stojanović
- Jacques Tati
- Pan Tau
- Jan Stuart Schwartz
- Whitney Rydbeck
- Modris Tenisons
- Teller
- Tik and Tok
- Henryk Tomaszewski
- Dick Van Dyke
- Sam Wills
- Vahram Zaryan
- Achille Zavatta
- Benedikt Negro

=== Fictional mime artists ===
- Art the Clown
- Mr. Mime
- Mime Jr.
- Mime (Happy Tree Friends)
- Luan Loud
- Mime (comics)
- Mimey

== See also ==
- Busking
- Corporeal mime
- Dumbshow
- Lip sync
- Liquid and digits
- Sociae Mimae
- Mummers play
- Pantomime
- Popping
- Physical theatre
- Turfing
