= Corporeal mime =

Theatrical genre

Corporeal mime is a physical theater technique developed by Étienne Decroux. The goal of the technique is to place drama inside the moving human body, rather than to substitute gesture for speech as in mime (sometimes called pantomime).

In this medium, the mime must apply to physical movement those principles that are at the heart of drama: pause, hesitation, weight, resistance and surprise. Corporeal mime accentuates the vital importance of the body and physical action on stage.

Étienne Decroux’s dramatic corporeal mime is taking the body as a main means of expression and the actor as a starting point for creation with the aim of “making the invisible visible” (Étienne Decroux), of allowing the actor to show thought through movement.

Art of movement rather than art of silence, dramatic corporeal mime is first of all the art of the actor/actress. An actor, whatever his artistic ambition might be, must, before all, be present, “be” on stage and this presence is shown through the body. The body is what sustains the costume, what the spectator sees, what carries the voice. It is the skeleton, the hand in the glove.

It was developed primarily by Étienne Decroux, who was heavily influenced by his training with Jacques Copeau at the École du Vieux-Colombier. He created this method and technique for creative performers wishing to transform their ideas into a physical reality, in order to devise a new style of theater "making visible the invisible," as Decroux put it.

The objectives of corporeal mime are to enable the actor to become more autonomous in creating metaphor-based physical theater pieces, which may include text, but are not based on text, i.e., to give the actor greater access to physical metaphors in work in traditional plays, and to increase the actor's strength, agility, flexibility and imaginative powers.

While Decroux’s movement style was quite different from the commedia dell'arte from which 19th century pantomime can be traced, Decroux was influenced by this classical art form. Decroux worked extensively with Piccolo Teatro (Milan), training actors and choreographing Arlecchino an adaptation of Goldoni's Servant of Two Masters directed by Giorgio Strehler. Coincidentally, Jacques Lecoq, another famous mime teacher worked as a movement teacher at Piccolo Teatro until he was succeeded by Decroux.

Unlike classical pantomime, corporeal mime was also no longer an anecdotal art that used conventional gestures to create illusions of objects or persons.

Corporeal mimes seek to express abstract and universal ideas and emotions through codified movements of the entire body (but most especially the trunk—the face and hands are confined to a secondary role in this movement form) Some corporeal mimes write their own texts, as did the Greek mime-authors, integrating the mime-actor's art with the author's. They also include props, costumes, masks, lighting effects and music. Because it contains movement expression along with other elements, it is often loosely alluded to as physical or movement theater.

== Bibliography ==
- Words on mime by Etienne Decroux
- Modern and Post-Modern Mime by Thomas Leabhart
- Etienne Decroux (Routledge Performance Practitioners) by Thomas Leabhart
- The Adam Darius Method (1984) by Adam Darius (ISBN 0950270725)
- The Dynamo-Rhythm of Etienne Decroux and His Successors, Mime Journal, v.24, by Leela Alaniz
- World Mime Organisation (2006), WMO

== See also ==
- Mime artist
- Liquid and digits
- Mummers Play
- Pantomime
- Popping
- Physical theatre
- Turfing
