= Étienne Decroux =

French actor (1898–1991)

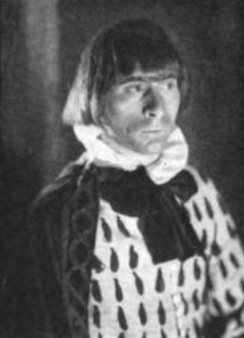
- Decroux c. 1929
- Born: 19 July 1898; Paris, France
- Died: 12 March 1991 (aged 92); Boulogne-Billancourt, France
- Occupation: Actor
- Years active: 1932–1968

Étienne Decroux (19 July 1898 in Paris, France – 12 March 1991 in Boulogne-Billancourt, France) was a French actor who specialized in the art of mime. Studying at Jacques Copeau's Théâtre du Vieux-Colombier, he developed the style known as corporeal mime.

== Career ==
Enrolled at the Théâtre du Vieux-Colombier in 1923, as a student of Charles Dullin, Decroux began to envision a newly defined vision of mime and later developed an original, personal style of movement. His early "statuary mime" recalls Rodin's sculptures. Later, more plastic forms were called "mime corporeal" or corporeal mime. An intellectual and theoretician, his body training was based in part on what modern dancers call "isolations", in which body sections move in a prescribed sequence, and, in part, on the physics of compensation required to keep the body in balance when the center of gravity is shifted.

He wanted to enlist other students into a mime company, but the acting students were not very interested. When the Vieux Colombier closed in 1924, Decroux taught at the acting school of Charles Dullin, the Atelier. Jean-Louis Barrault also came to the school, and the two worked closely for two years, producing corporeal mime pieces individually and together.

Arriving in New York in or around 1957, M. Decroux held morning and evening classes at a studio on 8th Avenue and 55th Street. Students came and went, but eventually were required to commit to a full-time regime when rehearsing for performance as The Mime Theatre of Etienne Decroux. Pieces presented at The Cricket Theatre in the Village included "The Factory," "The Trees," "All The City Works," and "Evil Spirit." Students at the time included Sterling Jenson, Sunya Svenson, Marjorie Walker (née Oplatka) and Jewel Walker, who continued to teach the classes in New York for a time after Decroux returned to Paris.

Returning from the United States to Paris in 1962, he opened his school in Boulogne-Billancourt where he taught almost until his death. Many hundreds of students passed through his school.

Among his better known students were Marcel Marceau, Jessica Lange, the Swedish, originally dancer, Ingemar Lindh and the Puerto Rican Luis Oliva and Annie Stainer from the UK.

== Publications ==
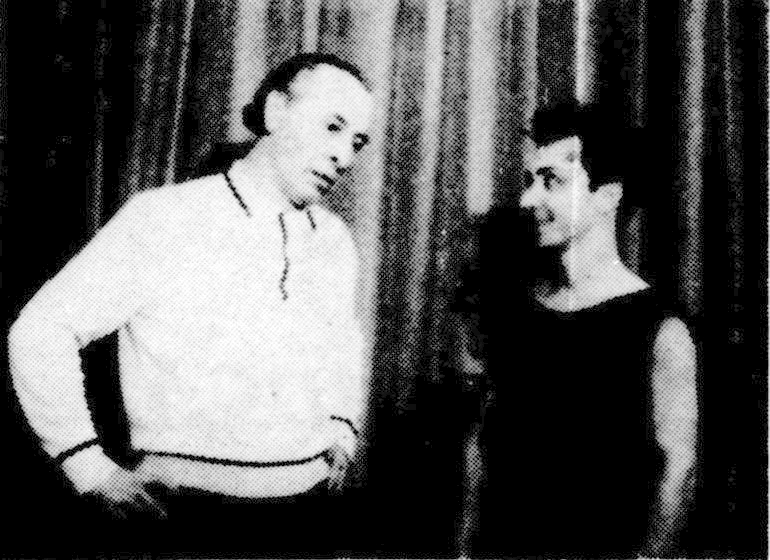
Decroux (left) with a student, c. 1959

Paroles sur le Mime (Words on Mime), is one of his writings still in print today. In Words on Mime, Decroux outlined a "cure" for a theatre scene mired by tradition and lack of inventiveness, a theatre which was "suffocating under a heap of rubble". He argued that ordinary speech should be banned from the theatre for a limited period (30 years) or until the actor had "taken charge in his own house"; that is, was able to fully use his/her expressive physical abilities. All vocal noises were prohibited for 20 years, after which the voice (and eventually intelligible speech) would gradually reappear – controlled by the actor and used only when it was necessary and not because of laziness or lack of invention. His proscriptions are as follows:

For a period of 30 years, the proscription of every alien art. We shall replace the drawing-room setting with the setting of the theatre itself, our intention being solely to provide a background for all imaginable actions.

For the first 10 years of this 30-year period: the proscription of any elevation on stage, such as stools, staircases, terraces, balconies, etc. The actor will have to give the impression that he is higher and his partner lower, even when in reality they are side by side. Later, the authorization of certain forms of elevation on condition that they create even greater difficulties for the actor.

For the first 20 years of this 30-year period: the proscription of any vocal sound. Then the acceptance of inarticulate cries for five years. Finally, words are accepted for the last five years of the 30-year period, but [they must be] invented by the actor.

After this period of war: stability. Plays shall be composed in the following order:

A. Rough outline of the written action serving as a basis for work.
B. The actor miming his action, then accompanying it with inarticulate sounds, then improvising his text.
C. Introduction of a dramaturge to translate the text into [the] choice language, without adding a word.
D. Reappearance of the alien arts, but practised by the actors. And when the actor is [the] master in his own home he shall see to the employment of dancers, singers and musicians for the indispensable and well-defined tasks. And then we shall see on the poster: 'text arranged by Mr. Secondo'." (Decroux, 1985, pp. 26–27)

== Filmography ==
- Enfin voir Etienne Decroux bouger (2006)
- Art of Etienne Decroux, The (1961)
- Compagnons de Baal, Les (1968) TV
- Comme un cheveu sur la soupe (1957)

... a.k.a. Crazy in the Noodle (USA)

- La Bergère et le ramoneur (1953) (voice)

... a.k.a. The Curious Adventures of Mr. Wonderbird (USA)

- Occupe-toi d'Amélie (1949)

... a.k.a. Oh Amelia!

- Clochemerle (1948)

... a.k.a. Scandals of Clochemerle (USA)

- Capitaine Blomet (1947)
- Voyage surprise (1947)
- Petites annonces matrimoniales, Les (1947)
- Enfants du paradis, Les (1945)

... a.k.a. Children of Paradise (USA)

- Voyageur sans bagages, Le (1944)
- Le Corbeau (1943) (uncredited)

... a.k.a. The Raven

- Adieu Léonard (1943)
- The Stairs Without End (1943)
- Macao (1942)

... a.k.a. Gambling Hell (USA)

- Le Dernier tournant (1939)

... a.k.a. The Last Turning

- Belle étoile (1938)
- Affaire Lafarge, L' (1937)

... a.k.a. The Lafarge Case (USA)

- Commissaire est bon enfant, le gendarme est sans pitié, Le (1935)
- Affaire est dans le sac, L' (1932)

... a.k.a. It's in the Bag
