= Herbert Parker (American politician) =

American lawyer (1856-1939)

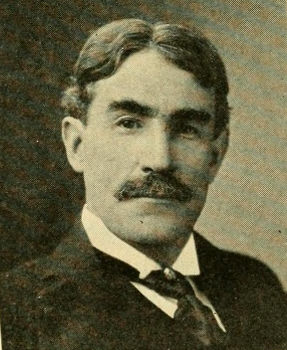

Attorney General of Massachusetts
- In office 1902–1906
- Governor: Winthrop M. Crane; John L. Bates; William L. Douglas
- Preceded by: Hosea M. Knowlton
- Succeeded by: Dana Malone

District attorney of Worcester County, Massachusetts
- In office 1895–1899
- Preceded by: Francis A. Gaskill
- Succeeded by: Rockwood Hoar

Personal details
- Born: March 2, 1856 Charlestown, Massachusetts, US
- Died: February 11, 1939 (aged 82) Lancaster, Massachusetts, US
- Party: Republican
- Spouse: Mary Carney Vose
- Relations: Cornelius Conway Felton (uncle); Samuel Morse Felton, Sr. (uncle); John B. Felton (uncle); Samuel Morse Felton, Jr. (cousin)
- Children: George Alanson Parker; Katherine Vose Parker; Edith Parker Ross; Haven Parker
- Education: Harvard College

Herbert Parker (March 2, 1856 – February 11, 1939), of Lancaster, Massachusetts, was a Massachusetts politician.

== Early life ==
Parker was born in Charlestown (now part of Boston), Suffolk County, Massachusetts on March 2, 1856. He was a son of George A. Parker and Harriet Newell (née Felton) Parker (1822–1914). His brother, Harold Parker, was one of the first highway commissioners in Massachusetts and planned many of the highways in the state.

His maternal grandparents were Anna (née Morse) Felton and Cornelius Conway Felton Sr. Among his maternal family were uncles, Cornelius Conway Felton (the President of Harvard from 1860 to 1862), Samuel Morse Felton, Sr., John B. Felton, and his cousin was Samuel Morse Felton, Jr.

He graduated from Harvard College in 1878.

== Career ==
Parker was a Republican. He was a lawyer and served as district attorney of Worcester County, Massachusetts from 1895 to 1899, and Attorney General of Massachusetts from 1902 to 1906. He was a Unitarian.

== Personal life ==
Parker was married to Mary Carney Vose, a daughter of Caroline Cushing (née Forbes) Vose and Lt. Josiah Hayden Vose Jr., who was killed at the Battle of Port Hudson in the U.S. Civil War. Together, they were the parents of:

- George Alanson Parker (1887–1966), who married Anne Holden (1896–1958), a daughter of Charles W. Holden.
- Katherine Vose Parker (1888–1983), a member of the Massachusetts House of Representatives.
- Edith Parker (1893–1968), who married Thorvald Salicath Ross (1887–1965).
- Haven Parker, who became Assistant Federal District Attorney General of Massachusetts and a judge.

Parker died on February 11, 1939, at his home in Lancaster, Massachusetts.
