= Exodium =

Comic afterpiece in ancient Roman theatre

An exodium (plural exodia) was a short, comic afterpiece in the ancient Roman theatre, typically performed at the conclusion of a tragedy to provide comic relief. The exodia slots were frequently used to perform Atellan farce.

== Etymology and function ==
The term derives from the Latin concept of an "end" or exitus, denoting a finale or a piece played while the theatre company was making its exit from the stage. According to a scholiast commenting on the satirist Juvenal, the primary purpose of the exodium was to raise a laugh and free the audience from the emotional distress caused by the passions of the preceding tragedy, a practice also alluded to by the earlier poet Lucilius.

The genre was known for its striking visual elements; Juvenal referenced it by describing a country child terrified by the ghastly, open-mouthed masks worn by the actors on stage.

== Historical accounts ==
Plutarch compared the funeral of Dionysius to a theatrical finale. He also described the macabre aftermath of the Battle of Carrhae, where the victorious Parthians staged a performance of Euripides's The Bacchae. During the performance, the actual severed head of the defeated Roman general Crassus was brought out in place of the character Pentheus. When the actor playing Agave proclaimed the kill, the soldier who had actually slain Crassus protested, causing general merriment among the audience. Plutarch likened this dark, impromptu comic exchange to a tragic military campaign ending with an amusing exodium.

== Performers ==
Stage artists who acted in these afterpieces were designated by the term exodiarii. Because an exodium could feature a wide variety of entertainment—including mime, dance, and music—it is difficult to definitively prove that an epigraph mentioning an exodiarius refers specifically to an Atellan actor. An inscription from Portugal, dating to the late first or second century AD, memorializes an exodiarius named Patricius, though it does not specify what kind of afterpiece he performed. A second-century Roman epitaph humorously labels a juggler named Ursus as an exodiarius to playfully contrast his lowly performances with the high status of his former master. A third-century AD inscription from Rome lists an exodiarius alongside several mime actors, though the late date makes it highly unlikely this performer was involved in Atellan farce.

== Relationship to other theatrical forms ==
By the time of the late Roman Republic, the exodium was closely associated with several forms of extemporary farce, including the mime and the Rhinthonian burlesque (phlyax play).

Livy noted that exodia were frequently combined with, or came to be replaced by, the Atellan farce (Atellanae). The terms were sometimes used interchangeably; the writer Pomponius, who was known specifically for his Atellan farces, even titled one of his works Exodium. The playwright Quintus Novius also gave one of his literary Atellan plays the title Exodium, indicating these more polished works still served as concluding shorts. The Byzantine writer John Lydus (in the 6th century AD) explicitly classified the Atellan farce as one of the pieces known as exodiaria, probably retelling the words of Varro.

The genre began facing fierce competition from mime, which gradually started to replace Atellan farce in the exodia during the middle of the first century BC. Despite this, Atellan comedies continued to be staged as exodia through the first century AD. The poet Juvenal observed that Atellan exodia were still being performed for audiences in the Italian countryside during the reign of Domitian.

An Augustan-era marble epitaph dedicated to the playwright Cn. Lucceius draws an unusual distinction between fabulae Atellanae and exodia. The poetic inscription suggests that Lucceius was second to Pomponius in writing Atellan plays, but ranked first in the composition of exodia. This separation implies that by the early imperial period, formal Atellan plays and exodia may have been viewed as two separate genres of writing. Scholars hypothesize that the exodia penned by Lucceius may have been cruder, shorter scripts intended strictly as afterpieces, while his Atellan comedies were longer, more complex literary works capable of standing on their own.

While Livy recorded that these performances were traditionally acted by Roman citizens who retained their right to serve in the military, the transition into the Roman Empire brought changes to the staging of these farces. As noted by Tacitus, by the imperial period, they were being performed by professional actors.

== Bibliography ==
- Beare, W. (1977). The Roman Stage: A Short History of Latin Drama in the Time of the Republic (3rd ed.). Totowa, NJ: Rowman and Littlefield. ISBN 0-87471-881-3 – via Internet Archive.
- González Galera, Víctor (2023). "Atellana actors and playwrights in the epigraphic evidence". The Classical Quarterly. 73 (2): 758–776. doi:10.1017/S0009838823000629.
