= Samuel Felton =

Samuel Felton may refer to:

- Samuel Felton (hammer thrower) (Samuel Morse Felton Jr., 1926–2015), American hammer thrower
- Samuel Morse Felton Sr. (1809–1889), American civil engineer and railroad executive
- Samuel Morse Felton Jr. (1853–1930), American railroad executive
- Sam Felton (Samuel M. Felton), American football and baseball player
