= Novia gens =

Ancient Roman family

The gens Novia was a minor plebeian family at ancient Rome. Members of this gens first appear during the final century of the Republic, but the first of the Novii to obtain the consulship was Decimus Junius Novius Priscus in AD 78.

== Origin ==
The nomen Novius is a patronymic surname, derived from the common Oscan praenomen Novius. Since both the praenomen and nomen have the same form, it can be difficult to determine in some cases whether persons named Novius bore it as a praenomen or a nomen gentilicium. In either case, the name itself establishes the Oscan origin of the Novii.

== Members ==
This list includes abbreviated praenomina. For an explanation of this practice, see filiation.

- Quintus Novius, a playwright in the time of Sulla, celebrated for his Atellane plays. He was a contemporary of Pomponius, another playwright specializing in the genre. Novius' work is frequently mentioned by Nonius Marcellus.
- Lucius Novius, possibly surnamed Niger, a tribune of the plebs in 58 BC, the year that Publius Clodius Pulcher held the office. Novius was strongly opposed to his colleague.
- Novius Facundus, a mathematician in the time of Augustus, who devised a means of measuring the length of days using an obelisk erected on the campus Martius.
- Decimus Junius Novius Priscus, consul in AD 78. He is probably the same Novius Priscus who was among Seneca's friends, banished by Nero in AD 66. His wife was Artoria Flacilla.
- Novius, a friend of Martial.
- Novius Maximus, a person to whom Pliny the Younger addressed two letters.
- Novius, a legacy hunter mentioned by Juvenal.
- Lucius Novius Crispinus Martialis Saturninus, proconsul of Gallia Narbonensis and legate pro praetore of Africa Proconsularis in the time of Antoninus Pius; consul suffectus at some time in 150 or 151.
- Gaius Novius Priscus, consul suffectus in AD 152. He married Flavia Menodora.
- Gaius Novius C. f. Rusticus Venuleius Apronianus, the son of Priscus and Flavia Menodora, served as tribunus laticlavius with the sixth legion, was a legate in Asia, a candidate for quaestor and tribune of the plebs, and praetor designatus.
- Publius Novius L. f. Saturninus Martialis Marcellus, the son of Crispinus, consul circa AD 150.
- Novia L. f. Crispina, daughter of the consul Crispinus, married Quintus Antistius Adventus.
- Lucius Novius Rufus, consul suffectus in AD 186, he was legate pro praetore in Hispania Tarraconensis in 193. Rufus was among the leading Romans put to death by Septimius Severus without cause.

== See also ==
- List of Roman gentes

== Bibliography ==
- Quintus Asconius Pedianus, Commentarius in Oratio Ciceronis Pro Milone (Commentary on Cicero's Oration Pro Milone).
- Gaius Plinius Secundus (Pliny the Elder), Naturalis Historia (Natural History).
- Marcus Valerius Martialis (Martial), Epigrammata (Epigrams).
- Gaius Plinius Caecilius Secundus (Pliny the Younger), Epistulae (Letters).
- Publius Cornelius Tacitus, Annales.
- Decimus Junius Juvenalis, Satirae (Satires).
- Aulus Gellius, Noctes Atticae (Attic Nights).
- Ambrosius Theodosius Macrobius, Saturnalia.
- Aelius Lampridius, Aelius Spartianus, Flavius Vopiscus, Julius Capitolinus, Trebellius Pollio, and Vulcatius Gallicanus, Historia Augusta (Augustan History).
- Friedrich Heinrich Bothe, Poëtae Scenici Latinorum (Fragments of the Latin Theatrical Poets), Heinrich Vogler, Halberstadt (1822).
- Dictionary of Greek and Roman Biography and Mythology, William Smith, ed., Little, Brown and Company, Boston (1849).
- George Davis Chase, "The Origin of Roman Praenomina", in Harvard Studies in Classical Philology, vol. VIII (1897).
- Paul von Rohden, Elimar Klebs, & Hermann Dessau, Prosopographia Imperii Romani (The Prosopography of the Roman Empire, abbreviated PIR), Berlin (1898).
- T. Robert S. Broughton, The Magistrates of the Roman Republic, American Philological Association (1952).
