= Afterpiece =

Short theatrical or musical piece after the main performance

An afterpiece (or postlude, German term Nachspiel is also used in English texts) is a short, usually humorous one-act playlet or musical work following the main attraction (the full-length play or music piece) and concluding the theatrical evening or religious service. In terms of content, there was usually no connection to the main performance. A similar theatrical piece preceding the main attraction is a curtain raiser.

== Music ==
In church music, a postlude is an outgoing voluntary, the term adopted from Latin-German Postludium (from Latin: post, "behind, after" + ludus, "play", from ludere, "to play"). The Dictionary of Music and Musicians notes Henry Smart, Joseph André, and Christian Heinrich Rinck occasionally employing it.

== European theatre ==
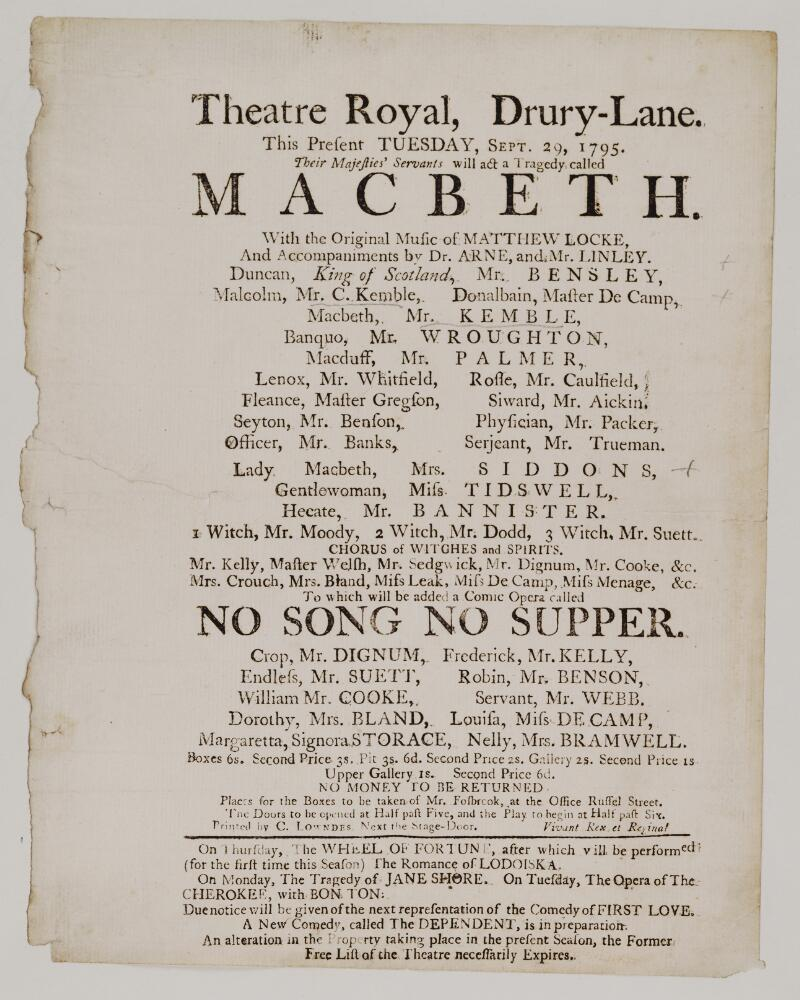
Matthew Locke's opera Macbeth and as an afterpiece Stephen Storace's No Song, No Supper (1795)

The short comedy, farce, opera, pantomime, or ballet was a popular theatrical form in the European theatre tradition until the end of the 19th century. It was presented to lighten the five-act tragedy that was commonly performed. An early English example is The Padlock by Charles Dibdin, first performed in London in 1768.

The first attested postlude in German-language theatre is part of the play Vom Bauern Mopsus, der seine Frau verprügelt (1581). It continued the tradition of pre-lent carnival plays. The afterpieces were extremely popular with the audience and were not only more attractive than the preceding grand tragedy, but even more popular than the Haupt- und Staatsaktion.

While attempting a theatre reform in 1737 in Leipzig, Johann Christoph Gottsched wanted to banish Hanswurst as a leading actor from the stage in an afterpiece written for this purpose. However, he could not assert himself and recommended dramaturgically developed one-act plays such as pastoral plays instead of the improvised burlesques, which were often played impromptu. However, these did not take root; as late as 1757, a performance of Gotthold Ephraim Lessing's bourgeois tragedy Miss Sara Sampson (1755) in Lübeck was followed by the ballet-pantomime Der vom Arlekin betrogene Pantalon und Pierrot. Even in the great era of the Hamburgische Entreprise (1767–69), a comic afterpiece was given after important dramas such as Nathan the Wise. The theatrical practice of afterpieces declined in the late 18th century.

From 1822 to 1824, Karl von Holtei published the Jahrbuch deutscher Nachspiele (Yearbook of German Afterpieces), which then bore the title Jahrbuch deutscher Bühnenspiele until 1844 (and was published with the participation of Friedrich Wilhelm Gubitz from 1832).

== Variants ==
In the history of theatre, many different forms of the afterpiece have emerged:

- the satyr play at the end of the three tragedies in the theatre of ancient Greece
- the exodium playing Atellanae in the theatre of ancient Rome
- the klucht as a afterpiece (sotternie) to the Abele spelen and morality plays in the Middle Ages
- the jigs and Pickelhering plays of the English comedians of Elizabethan theatre and the German travelling theatres
- the Schwank and farce as vernacular plays after the Latin school dramas in the Jesuit theatre of the Baroque period
- the entremeses and sainetes of Spanish Baroque theatre
- the divertissement as a dance afterpiece
- the Harlequin farces from the Italian tradition of the commedia dell'arte in the 17th and 18th centuries, which were also cultivated in French comedy, including by Molière.

== Postludes as part of dramas ==
Not to be confused with this tradition are postludes that have a thematic connection with the main play, such as the allegorical interpretations of the Jesuit dramas, and the dramatic epilogue, which offers an addendum or prospect from the play, including in Arthur Miller's Death of a Salesman (1949) and Max Frisch's The Fire Raisers (1958), combined by Pavel Kohout in his one-act plays with prologues and interludes. This form of the postlude only emerged in the 19th century, for example in Friedrich de la Motte Fouqué's Die Belagerung von Byzanz oder Griechisches Feuer (published posthumously in 2004).

== Bibliography ==
- Chambers (2003). The Chambers Dictionary. Edinburgh: Chambers. ISBN 0-550-10013-X.
- John, David Genthin (1991). The German Nachspiel in the eighteenth century. Toronto. ISBN 0-8020-2771-7.
- Kattwinkel, Susan (1998). Tony Pastor presents: afterpieces from the vaudeville stage. Westport, Connecticut. ISBN 0-313-30459-9.
- Maidment, Christopher (1993). Satura und Satyroi. Die englische Renaissance-Satire im Widerstreit zweier Etymologien. Studien zur Aufdeckung einer Gattungskontamination am Beispiel der elisabethanisch-jakobäischen satirischen Literatur (Dissertation). Munich.
- Sachs, Michael (2018). "'Fürstbischof und Vagabund'. Geschichte einer Freundschaft zwischen dem Fürstbischof von Breslau Heinrich Förster (1799–1881) und dem Schriftsteller und Schauspieler Karl von Holtei (1798–1880). Nach dem Originalmanuskript Holteis textkritisch herausgegeben". Medizinhistorische Mitteilungen. Zeitschrift für Wissenschaftsgeschichte und Fachprosaforschung. 35: 223–291.
