= Novia =

Novia is a Spanish word that means "girlfriend" (novio means "boyfriend"). It may also refer to:

- Jimenez Novia, a supercar built only in a single model in 1995 by Jimenez, a French maker
- "La novia", a song by Chilean songwriter Joaquín Prieto
- Mi Novia, a painting by award-winning Filipino painter and hero Juan Luna
- Novia gens, an ancient Roman family
