= Dorsennus =

Fabius Dorsennus (also spelled Dossennus or Dossenus) was a thespian and author of Atellan Farce in Ancient Rome, known for his careless performances. According to Seneca his epitaph was: "Halt, stranger, and understand Dossennus' wisdom".

== Description ==
There is some confusion regarding this figure from ancient Roman theater. In one of his epistles, Horace mentions a Dossennus:

[He] exceeds all measure in his voracious parasites; with how loose a sock he runs over the stage: for he is glad to put the money in his pocket, after this regardless whether his play stand or fall.

— Book II, Epistle I

Pliny the Elder, however, refers to a Fabius Dossennus as the author of "Acharistio," one of the Atellanae Fabulae, in his Natural History. Pliny writes:

Fabius Dossennus quite decides the question, in the following line—; 'I sent them good wine, myrrh-wine'; and in his play called Acharistio, we find these words: 'Bread and pearled barley, myrrh-wine too.'

— Book XIV, Epistle 15 (92)

== Other uses ==
Dossennus was also the name of a stock character of the Atellanae Fabulae, perhaps named after Fabius Dorsennus.

== Sources ==
- (in English) Pliny the Elder, Natural History, Book XIV (Original text)
- (in English) Pliny the Elder, Natural History, Book XIV (English translation)
- (in English) History of Roman Literature (1877)
- (in French) Meyer, Maurice, Études sur le théâtre latin
