= James Walker (Harvard) =

American Unitarian minister, professor (1794–1874)

The Reverend James Walker
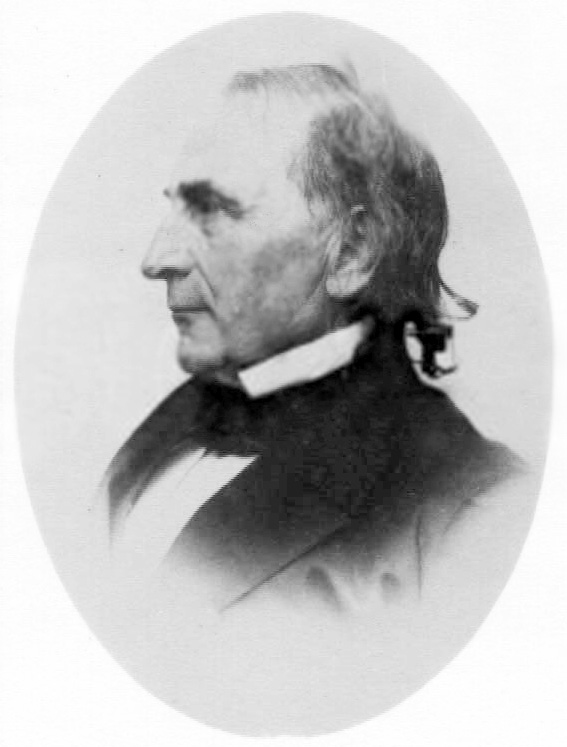

President of Harvard University
- In office 1853–1860
- Preceded by: Jared Sparks
- Succeeded by: Cornelius Conway Felton

Personal details
- Born: August 16, 1794 Woburn, Massachusetts
- Died: December 23, 1874 (aged 80) Cambridge, Massachusetts

James Walker (August 16, 1794 – December 23, 1874) was a Unitarian minister, professor, and President of Harvard College from February 10, 1853, to January 26, 1860.

== Biography ==
Walker was born to John and Lucy (Johnson) Walker in Woburn, Massachusetts (now in Burlington). From 1801-1810 he attended Lawrence Academy. He graduated in 1814 from Harvard, where he was a member of the Hasty Pudding. Afterward he taught for one year at the Phillips Exeter Academy and then returned to study at the Harvard Divinity School (class of 1817), after which he served for twenty years as the Unitarian minister of Harvard Church in Charlestown, Massachusetts. During this period, he was active in his parochial duties and in advocating the cause of school and college education, lectured extensively and with success, and was a close student of literature and philosophy.

In 1838, Walker was appointed Harvard's Alford Professor of Natural Religion, Moral Philosophy, and Civil Polity, which position he held until 1853, when he was elected president of the college. During his administration, music was added to Harvard's curriculum. Walker also served as a Fellow of Harvard College (1834-1853) and a member of its Board of Overseers (1825-1836, 1864-1874). He was elected a Fellow of the American Academy of Arts and Sciences in 19XX.

He was president at Harvard until his resignation in 1860. He devoted the remainder of his life to scholarly pursuits, and left his library and $15,000 to Harvard, where he received the degree of D.D. in 1835. At Yale he received the degree of LL.D. in 1860.

== Writings ==
He published numerous sermons, addresses, and lectures, including three series of lectures on “Natural Religion,” and a course of Lowell Institute lectures on “The Philosophy of Religion”. Other works are Sermons preached in the Chapel of Harvard College (Boston, 1861) a Memorial of Daniel Appleton White (1863), and a Memoir of Josiah Quincy (1867). After his death a volume of his “Discourses” appeared in 1876. Sermons, Reason, faith and Duty, preached chiefly in the college chapel, Boston, American Unitarian Association, 1892, was published "by his brothers,"

He also edited, as college textbooks, Dugald Stewart's Philosophy of the Active and Moral Powers (1849), and Thomas Reid's Essays on the Intellectual Powers, Abridged, with Notes and Illustrations from Sir William Hamilton and Others (1850).

== Family ==
In 1829 Walker married Catherine Bartlett (1798-1868); they had no children.

== Notes ==
Academic offices
Preceded by Jared Sparks	President of Harvard University; 1853–1860	Succeeded by Cornelius Conway Felton
