= Katherine Vose Parker =

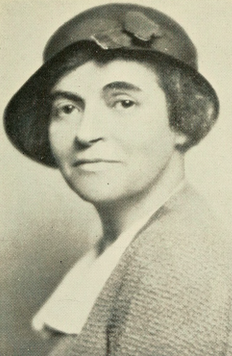

Member of the Massachusetts House of Representatives
- In office 1935–1936

Personal details
- Born: November 16, 1888 Lancaster, Massachusetts
- Died: August 17, 1983 (aged 94) Boston, Massachusetts
- Party: Republican
- Parent(s): Herbert Parker; Mary Carney Vose

Katherine Vose Parker (November 16, 1888 – August 17, 1983) was an American Republican politician who was a member of the Massachusetts House of Representatives.

== Early life ==
Parker was born on November 16, 1888, in Lancaster, Massachusetts. She was a daughter of Mary Carney (née Vose) Parker and Harvard educated lawyer Herbert Parker, who served as the Attorney General of Massachusetts. Her elder brother was George Alanson Parker and her younger siblings were Edith Parker and Haven Parker (an Assistant Federal District Attorney General of Massachusetts).

She attended the May School in Boston, which later merged with the Brimmer School to become the Brimmer and May School.

Her maternal grandparents were Caroline Cushing (née Forbes) Vose and Lt. Josiah Hayden Vose Jr., who was killed at the Battle of Port Hudson in the U.S. Civil War. Her grandmother remarried to James Francis in 1873. Her uncle, Harold Parker, was one of the first highway commissioners in Massachusetts and planned many of the highways in the state.

From October 1909 to October 1910, Parker was a volunteer visitor of home libraries for the Boston Children's Aid Society.

== Career ==
In 1930, Parker was elected president of the Women's Republican Club of Massachusetts, succeeding Mrs. Franklin W. Hobbs, who held the office for three years. Parker was the third president of the club since it was founded in 1922.

On November 6, 1934, Parker was elected as a Republican member of the Massachusetts House of Representatives for Ninth Worcester in the 149th Massachusetts General Court while residing in South Lancaster, Massachusetts. She served in both sessions from January 2, 1935, to August 15, 1935, and from January 1, 1936, to July 2, 1936.

== Personal life ==
Parker died on August 17, 1983, in Boston, Massachusetts. She was buried at Eastwood Cemetery in Lancaster.
