= The Boy and the Blind Man =

The Boy and the Blind Man (French: Le Garçon et l'aveugle) is the name of a 13th-century French play; considered the oldest surviving French farce. It is an anonymous work.

In the play there are two scoundrels, a "blind" beggar and his servant boy. The blind beggar has a secret hoard of coins, which the boy tricks away from him. The boy deceives, robs then beats his master – the trickster has become the tricked.

It was a simple play with no props and could be performed by two actors anywhere. It probably is one of many performed by wandering jongleurs catering to the tastes and theme of market days and fairs. An important business for the actors was to collect money from spectators, and the actor's beggar-man part in the play allowed for comic audience participation.

Because the deceiver is deceived, along with slapstick action, it is considered the oldest surviving farce in French literature. This means it is the oldest to survive in written form, but is very probably part of a much older oral tradition.

This "trickster is tricked" theme, and that of the cuckolded husband, were the main preoccupations of the medieval farceur. The play is in many respects identical to the first chapter of The Life of Lazarillo de Tormes, a picaresque novel published anonymously in Spain in 1554. The play may have served as source material for the book, or both may have emerged from a common folktale.
