= Pulcinella =

Commedia dell'arte character

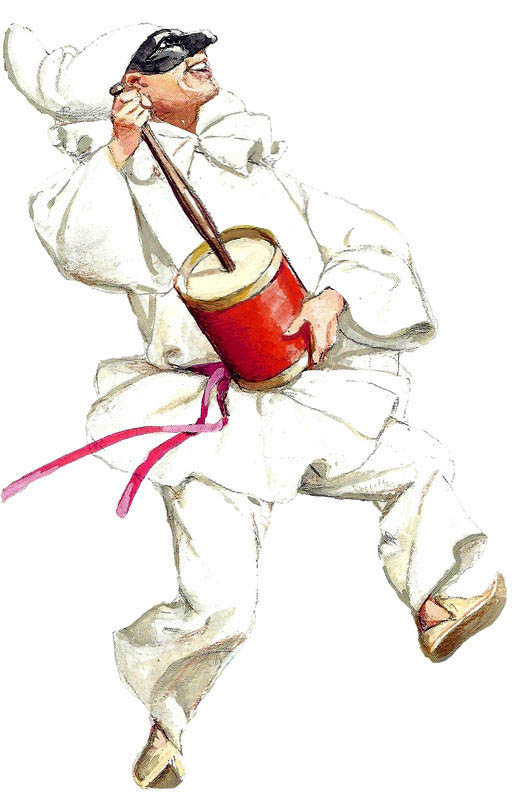
Pulcinella in a 19th-century Italian print

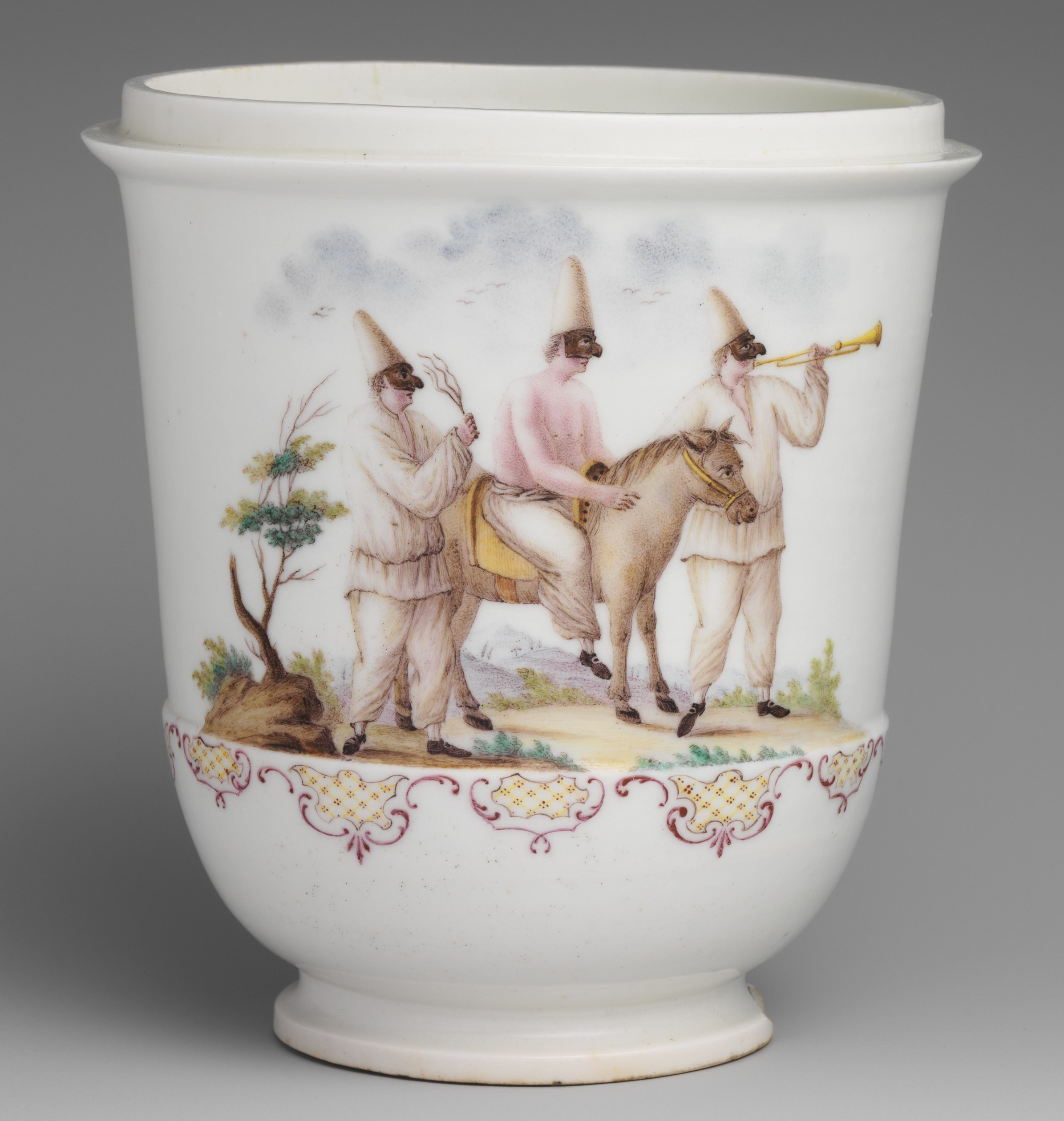
Capodimonte porcelain jar with three figures of Pulcinella. Naples, Italy, 1745–1750.

Pulcinella (Italian: [pultʃiˈnɛlla]; Neapolitan: Pulecenella) is a classical character that originated in commedia dell'arte of the 17th century and became a stock character in Neapolitan puppetry. Pulcinella's versatility in status and attitude have helped maintain the character's popularity in various forms since his introduction to commedia dell'arte by Silvio Fiorillo in 1620.

His visual appearance includes a humpback, a crooked nose, gangly legs, a potbelly, large cheeks, and a gigantic mouth. These traits were inherited from two stock characters of the Atellan Farce. He typically wears a conical hat. When depicted as a member of the upper class, Pulcinella is a cunning thief and schemer. When depicted as a member of the servant class, Pulcinella is a perverted country bumpkin. In either case, he is a social climber, striving to rise above his station in life. He is an opportunist who always sides with the winner in any situation and who fears no consequences. His main motivations are self-interest and self-preservation, yet Pulcinella tends to rescue other characters from trouble. He is said to be every character's savior, despite acting as a rebel and a delinquent.

== Characteristics ==
Pulcinella embodies the Neapolitan plebeians, the simplest man who occupies the bottom place on the social scale, the man who, although aware of his problems, always manages to come out of them with a smile.

Pulcinella represents the soul of the people and its primitive instincts. He almost always appears in contradiction, so much so that he does not have fixed traits. He may be rich or poor, a bully or a coward—sometimes exhibiting both traits simultaneously. In addition to being a faithful servant, he adapts to all trades: baker, innkeeper, farmer, thief, seller of miraculous concoctions.

His movements are broad and laborious, allowing him to aggressively emphasize his speech while simultaneously exhausting him. He will also get excited about something and move very quickly and deliberately, leaving him with no choice but to halt the action to catch his breath. He is to be thought of as a rebellious delinquent in the body of an old man.

In the commedia dell'arte tradition, Pulcinella is characterized by an opportunistic cunning, which he employs to resolve immediate predicaments and outwit authority figures.

Another famous characteristic of his is that of never being able to shut up; from this trait comes the expression in several European languages "Pulcinella's secret" (i.e., an open secret that everyone knows).

Pulcinella's repertoire is full of movements, gestures, acrobatics, and dances rooted in Neapolitan culture. Among his accessories are the broom, the horn, and the cowbells, all of which Neapolitans consider charms against the evil eye and bad luck.

Pulcinella has his origins in two stock characters of the ancient Roman Atellan Farce, Maccus and Bucco. Maccus is described as being witty, sarcastic, rude, and cruel, while Bucco is a nervous thief who is as silly as he is full of himself. This duality manifests itself in both how Pulcinella is shaped and the way he acts.

Physically, the characteristics Pulcinella has inherited from his ancestors contribute to his top-heavy, bird-like shape. His humpback, his large, crooked nose, and his gangly legs come from Maccus, while his potbelly, large cheeks, and gigantic mouth come from Bucco.

Due to this duality of heredity, Pulcinella can be portrayed as either a servant or a master, depending on the scenario. "Upper" Pulcinella is more like Bucco, with a scheming nature, an aggressive sensuality, and great intelligence. "Lower" Pulcinella, however, favors Maccus, and is described by Pierre Louis Duchartre as being "a dull and coarse bumpkin". This juxtaposition of a proud, cunning thief from the upper class and a loud, crass pervert from the servant class is key to understanding Pulcinella's behaviors.

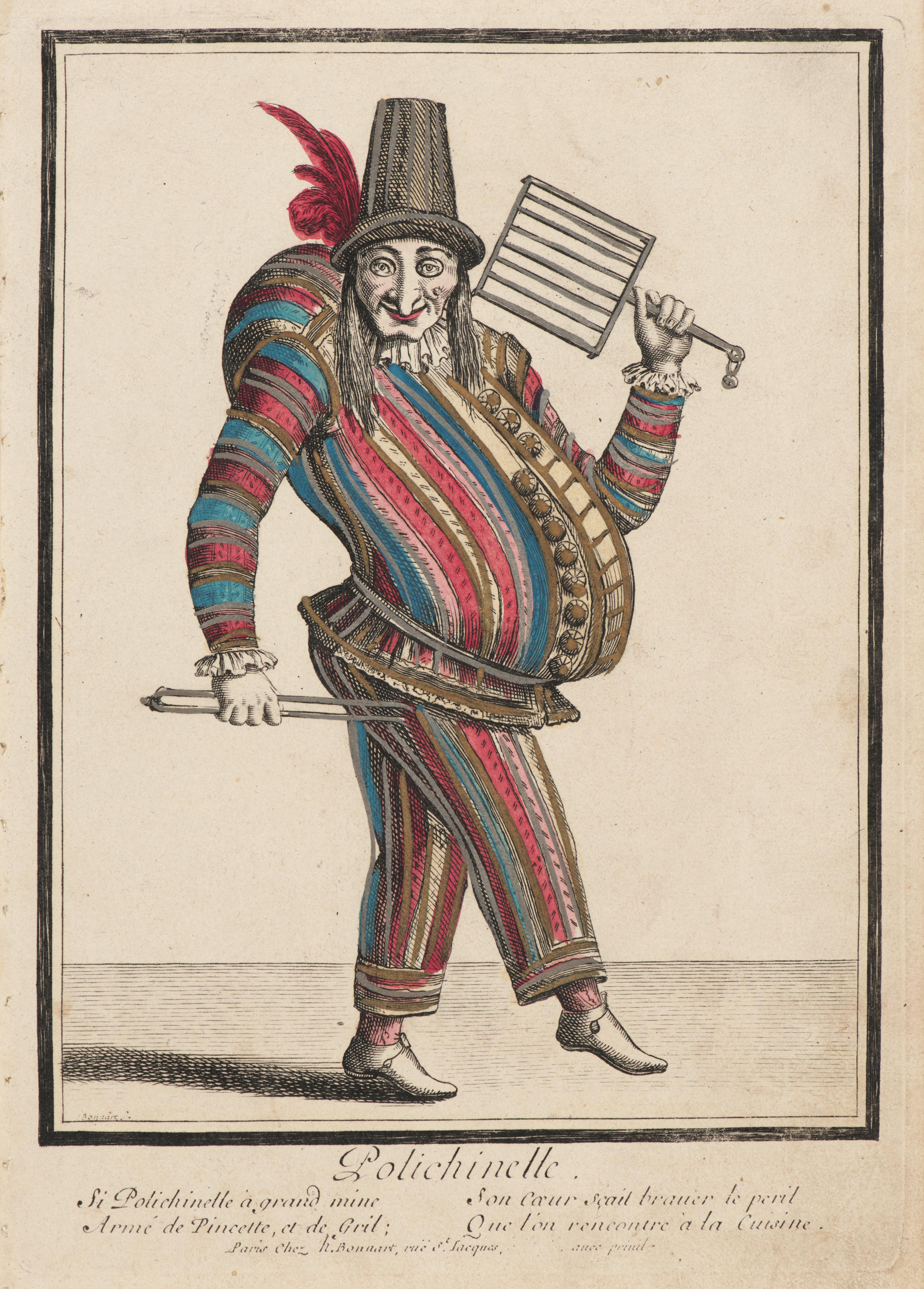
Polichinelle, c. 1680 by French artist Nicolas Bonnart. The first of a set of five etching entitled Five Characters from the Commedia dell'Arte. Etching with hand coloring on laid paper.

Pulcinella is a dualistic character: he either plays dumb, although he is very much aware of the situation, or he acts as though he is the most intelligent and competent one on the stage, despite being woefully ignorant. He incessantly attempts to rise above his station while not intending to work for it. He is a social chameleon who tries to get those below him to think highly of him but is quick to appease the powerful.

Pulcinella's closing couplet translates to: "I am Prince of everything, Lord of land and main. Except for my public whose faithful servant I remain." However, because his status is often that of a servant, he has no real investment in preserving the socio-political world of his master. He is always on the side of the winner, although he often does not decide this until after they have won. No matter his initial intent, Pulcinella always manages to win. If something ends poorly, another thing is successful. If he is put out in one sense, he is rewarded in another. This often accidental triumph is his norm.

Another important characteristic of Pulcinella is that he is depicted as fearless. He does not worry about consequences as he will be victorious no matter what. It has been said that he is pleasant to watch because he does what audience members would do were they not afraid of the consequences.

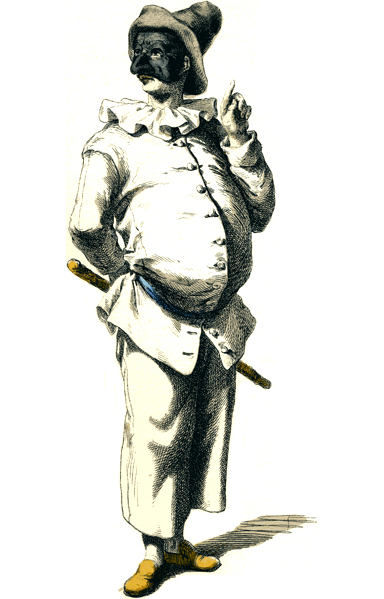
Book illustration of Pulcinella in 1700 (1860) by Maurice Sand, found in Masques et bouffons: comédie italienne

Pulcinella is generally portrayed as a character concerned with his own interests, although his actions can also help others overcome difficulties. Antonio Fava, a commedia dell'arte performer and maskmaker, describes Pulcinella as someone who helps his masters out of trouble while receiving little assistance in return. Despite his efforts to avoid responsibility, the character frequently becomes involved in the problems of those around him.

== Mask ==
Traditionally made of leather, Pulcinella's mask is either black or dark brown, to imply weathering from the sun. His nose varies in shape, but it is always the most prominent feature of the mask. It can be long and curved, hooking over the mouth, or it can be shorter with a more bulbous bridge. Either way, the nose is designed to resemble a bird's beak. There is often a wart somewhere on the mask, typically on the forehead or nose. Furrowed eyebrows and deep wrinkles are also important, although there is room for artistic interpretation. He can have a protruding brow ridge, knitted brows, a furrowed brow, or simply raised eyebrows, as long as they are prominent enough to match the exaggerated style of commedia dell'arte masks. The mask used to feature a bushy black mustache or beard, but this was mostly abandoned after the 17th century.

== Costume and props ==
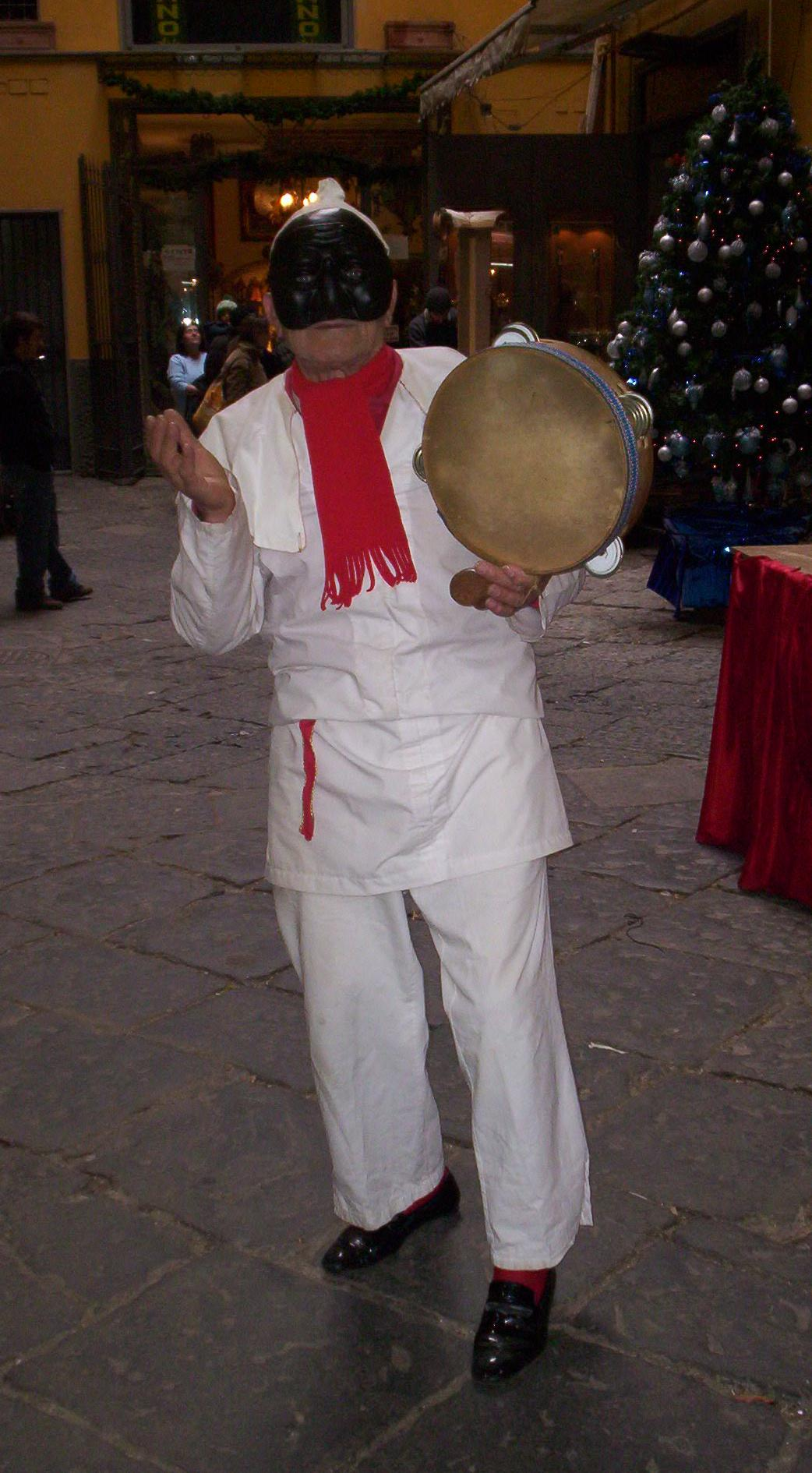
Pulcinella costume

Pulcinella is most often portrayed in a white ensemble consisting of wide-legged trousers and a long-sleeved, loose-fitting blouse with buttons down the front. The outfit is completed by a belt that cinches below the waist, giving Pulcinella a place to hold props while emphasizing his pot belly. A white hat is always worn, typically either a skull cap, a hat with turn-up brim, a soft conical hat whose point lies down, or a rigid sugar-loaf hat. The sugar-loaf hat gained popularity in the late 17th and early 18th centuries.

Pulcinella has two main props. The first is a cudgel, a relatively short stick used primarily as a weapon. He calls this his "staff of credit". His other prop is a coin purse, traditionally attached to his belt so as to stay close to his body.

== Etymology ==
A plausible theory derives his name from the diminutive (or combination with pollastrello 'rooster')) of Italian pulcino ('chick'), on account of his long beaklike nose, as theorized by music historian Francesco Saverio Quadrio, or due to the squeaky nasal voice and "timorous impotence" in its demeanor, according to Giuseppe (Joseph) Baretti. A different explanation of the name's reference to chickens is an origin account, that tells that of two witches who created an egg which the god Pluto placed in the crater of Mount Vesuvius. From this egg hatched Pulcinella.

According to another version, Pulcinella derived from the name of Puccio d'Aniello, a peasant of Acerra, who was portrayed in a famous picture attributed to Annibale Carracci, and was characterized by a long nose. It has also been suggested that the figure is a caricature of a sufferer of acromegaly.

== Variants ==
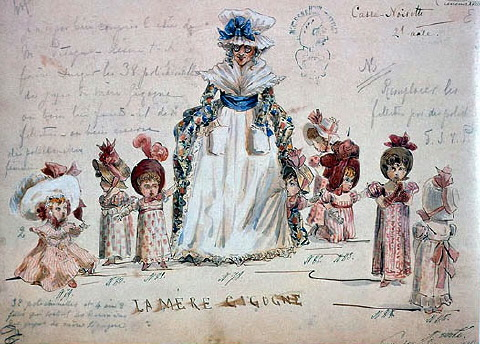
Mother Ginger and her Polichinelles in The Nutcracker

Many regional variants of Pulcinella were developed as the character diffused across Europe. From its east to west coasts, Europeans strongly identified with the tired, witty "everyman" that Pulcinella represented. In later adaptations, Pulcinella was often portrayed as a puppet, as commedia dell'arte-style theatre did not continue to be popular throughout all of the continent over time. This puppet evolved into "Mr. Punch" in England. As half of Punch and Judy, he is recognized as one of the most important British icons in history.

The first recorded show to have involved the Punch-style marionette was performed in England in May 1662, outside of London in Covent Garden, by Bologna-born puppeteer Pietro Gimonde, also known as Signor Bologna. This marionette was named Punchinello, later shortened to Punch, and finally becoming wholly British with his transformation into Mr. Punch. The British Punch is far more childlike and violent than Pulcinella but is renowned for being just as funny. Always seen with cudgel in hand, Punch is more menacing than his Italian counterpart. In many performances, he murders his wife and child, as well as the Devil. In 1851, Henry Mayhew wrote of one performer who described the character's enduring appeal: "Like the rest of the world, he has got bad morals, but very few of them."

In Germany, this kind of Pulcinella-based puppet character came to be known as Kasper. Kasper is a cunning servant who solves the problems of all the masters he serves. He was less extreme than Mr. Punch, but offered the same kind of slapstick puppetry that audiences loved. This character became wildly popular throughout Europe. In the Netherlands, he is known as Jan Klaassen. In Denmark he is Mester Jakel. In Romania, he is Vasilache. In Hungary he is Paprika Jancsi (or Paprikajancsi) and in the 20th century Vitéz László. In France he remained Polichinelle. Polichinelles were featured as the children of Mother Ginger (la mère Gigogne) in The Nutcracker by Tchaikovsky.

Russian composer Igor Stravinsky was commissioned to compose two different ballets for the Ballets Russes that were inspired by variations of this character. Stravinsky's ballets were entitled Petrushka (1911), based on Russian 19th-century puppetry traditions celebrated at Shrovetide, and Pulcinella (1920), based on 18th-century Italian music (thought to be by Pergolesi) associated with a commedia dell'arte version.

== See also ==
- Commedia dell'arte
