= Hosea M. Knowlton =

American politician

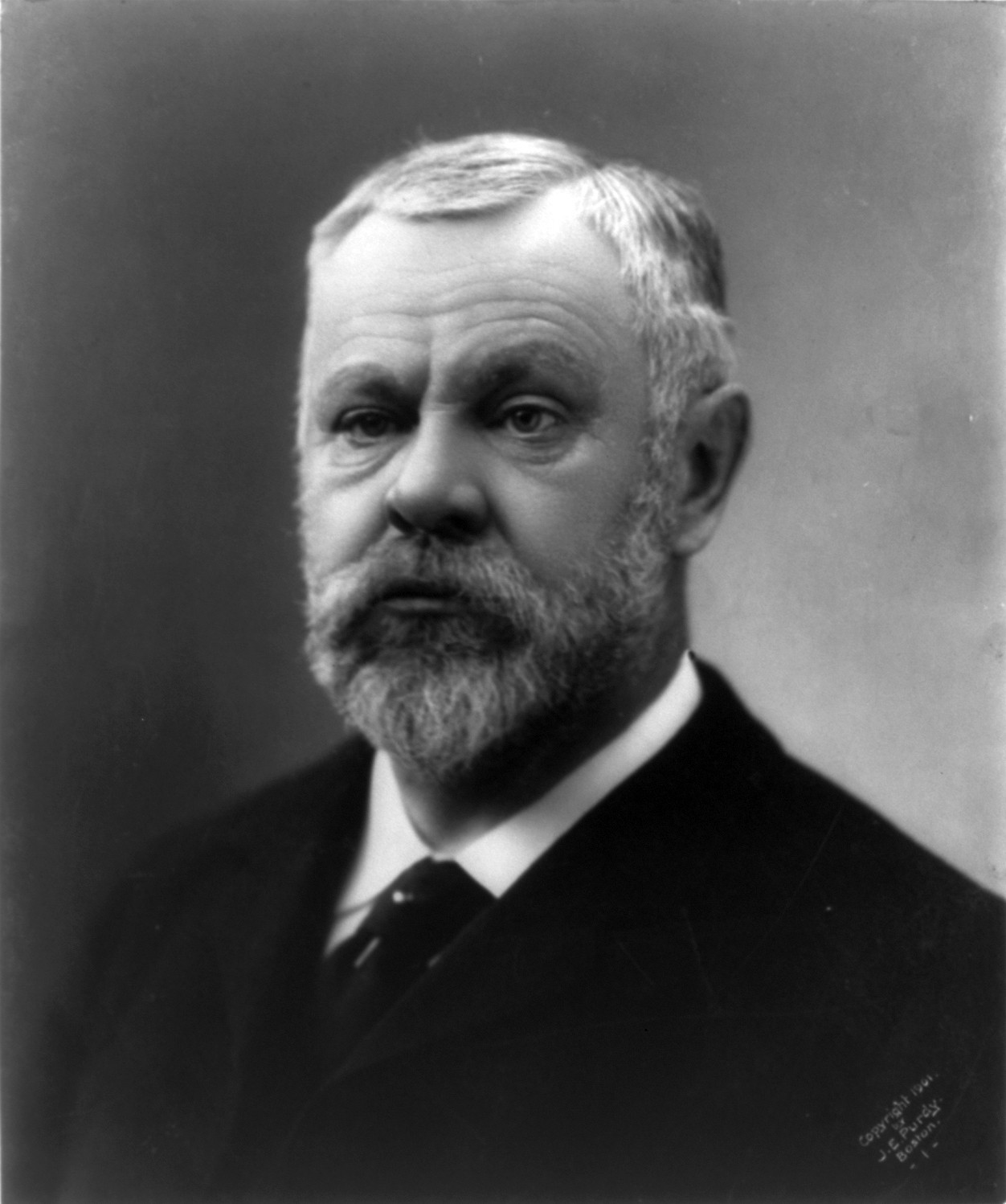
- Portrait by J. E. Purdy, 1901

18th Attorney General of Massachusetts
- In office January 17, 1894 – January 16, 1902
- Governor: Frederic T. Greenhalge; Roger Wolcott; Winthrop M. Crane
- Preceded by: Albert E. Pillsbury
- Succeeded by: Herbert Parker

District Attorney for the Southern District
- In office January 24, 1879 – January 17, 1894
- Preceded by: George Marston
- Succeeded by: Lloyd E. White

Member of the Massachusetts Senate from the 3rd Bristol district
- In office January 2, 1878 – January 24, 1879
- Preceded by: Joshua Morse
- Succeeded by: George B. Richmond

Member of the Massachusetts House of Representatives
- In office January 5, 1876 – January 2, 1878
- Preceded by: Charles R. Tucker
- Succeeded by: Thomas B. Hathaway
- Constituency: 11th Bristol district (1876‍–‍77); 6th Bristol district (1877‍–‍78)

Personal details
- Born: Hosea Morrill Knowlton; May 20, 1847 Durham, Maine, U.S.
- Died: December 19, 1902 (aged 55) Marion, Massachusetts, U.S.
- Party: Republican
- Spouse: Sylvia Bassett Almy (m. 1873)
- Children: 8
- Education: Tufts College (BA); Harvard Law School
- Occupation: Lawyer; politician

Hosea Morrill Knowlton (May 20, 1847 – December 19, 1902) was an American lawyer and politician. After short stints in both houses of the Massachusetts General Court, he served as district attorney in Bristol County, Massachusetts, and was the subject of national attention in 1893 as lead prosecutor in the case of Lizzie Borden, who was tried and acquitted of the murders of her father and stepmother. He later served as Massachusetts attorney general.

== Early life and family ==
=== Childhood and education ===
Knowlton was born on May 20, 1847, in Durham, Maine, to the Rev. Dr. Isaac Case Nolton and Mary Smith Knowlton (née Wellington). He attended Keene High School in Keene, New Hampshire, and Tufts College, the latter of which granted him the degree of Bachelor of Arts in 1867. Following his graduation from Tufts, Knowlton attended Harvard Law School for a year, after which he read law in the office of Edwin Luther Barney of New Bedford, Massachusetts.

=== Marriage and children ===
In 1873, Knowlton married the former Sylvia Bassett Almy. Together, they had eight children: John Wellington Knowlton, Abby Almy Knowlton, Frank Warren Knowlton, Edward Allen Knowlton, Helen Sophia Knowlton, August I. Knowlton, Sylvia Prescott Knowlton, and Benjamin Almy Knowlton.

== Career ==
Knowlton was admitted as a member of the bar in June 1870. He then traveled to Boston, where he worked for a year before returning to New Bedford. A member of the Republican Party, he served as a member of New Bedford's school committee from 1873 to 1876, when he was elected to a term in the Massachusetts House of Representatives. He was New Bedford's city solicitor in 1877. He also served as register in bankruptcy from May 1872 until that office's abolition in 1878 and ran an unsuccessful campaign to become clerk of the local district court. He served in the state senate from 1878 to 1879.

In January 1879, George Marston resigned as district attorney for Massachusetts's Southern District, following the certification of his election in November as Massachusetts Attorney General. Governor Thomas Talbot chose Knowlton to replace Marston as head prosecutor for the district—which included Bristol, Barnstable, Dukes, and Nantucket counties—and the appointment was confirmed by the Executive Council. It was in this capacity that Knowlton became known nationally as lead prosecutor in the 1893 murder trial of Lizzie Borden. Despite Borden's acquittal, Knowlton won election later that year as state attorney general, defeating Democratic nominee Charles S. Lilley, and served two four-year terms before choosing to retire in 1902.

== Death ==
Knowlton died in Marion, Massachusetts, on December 19, 1902.

== Bibliography ==
- Bridgman, Arthur Milnor (1894), A Souvenir of Massachusetts Legislators 1894, Vol. III, Brockton, Ma: A. M. Bridgman, p. 107.
- Bristol County Bar (April 21, 1903), Hosea Morrill Knowlton Tribute of the Bristol County Bar to the memory of the late Hon. Hosea Morrill Knowlton at Taunton, April 21, 1903, New Bedford, MA: E. Anthony & Sons.
- The Hartford Courant, page 15, December 19, 1902, HOSEA M. KNOWLTON Death of an Ex-Attorney General of Massachusetts.
- The New York Times, page 9, December 19, 1902, DEATH LIST OF A DAY.; Hosea M. Knowlton.
- Cutter, William Richard (1916), Encyclopedia of Massachusetts, Biographical—Genealogical, Volume VI, New York, N. Y., Boston, Ma: American Historical Society (Inc.), p9. 225-226.
- Pearson, Edmund L., Studies in Murder MacMillan Company, New York, N.Y. (1924)

Legal offices
Preceded by Albert E. Pillsbury	Attorney General of Massachusetts; 1894 - 1902	Succeeded by Herbert Parker
