= Antonio Fava =

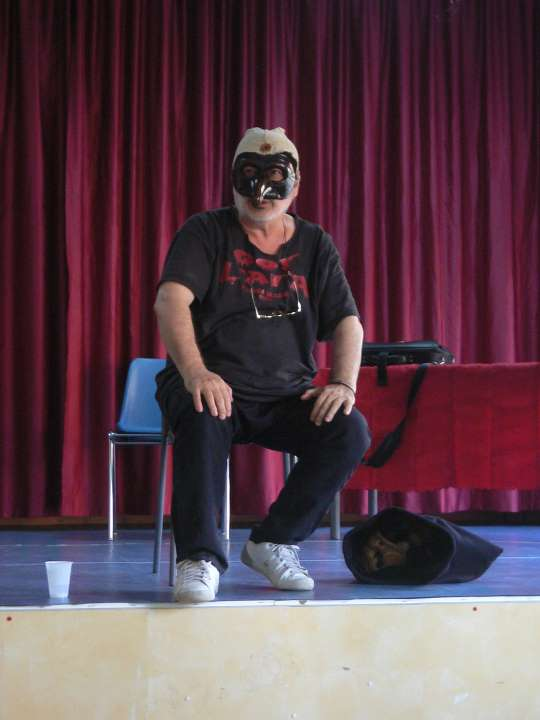
Antonio Fava wearing a "Pulcinella" mask he made

Antonio Fava (born May 28, 1949) is an actor, comedian, author, director, musician, mask maker and Internationally renowned Maestro of Commedia dell'arte who lives in Reggio Emilia, Italy.

Born in Scandale, a small village in the province of Crotone, Italy. He moved permanently to Reggio Emilia. Where he holds his annual courses In Commedia dell'arte. The masks that Antonio Fava creates are the world's finest and, led him to be recognised and affirmed in the field. Thanks to the formation of his International School of Commedia dell’arte ‘Arscomica’ and his collaboration with leading theatre companies his masks are now on display in various museums worldwide.

He began his acting career at the National Theatre of Strasbourg. His adventure continued alongside the French writer Jean-Pierre Chabrol in Paris, while he was working for the realisation of the Theatre of the Jacquerie.

Back in Reggio Emilia Antonio Fava founded the Teatro del Vicolo, where, since 1980, he has staged many of his plays whilst continuing international tours that extend to France, Spain, Great Britain, Switzerland, Senegal, Lebanon, Japan, Czech Republic, Slovakia, Pakistan, United States, Canada, and Australia. All the while pursuing various collaborations and directions, particularly at the Institute of Theatre of Barcelona, at the RESAD (Real escuela de arte dramatico) in Madrid, for the Australian National Commedia dell’arte troupe ‘Fools in Progress Theatre Company’in Sydney, Australia and at the CIP of Tramelan in Switzerland.

He has taught in universities and theatres all over the world, including the University of Exeter in England, at the Theatre Populaire Jurassien Lons le Saunier in France at l 'Ecole Superieure de Teatro-Universite du Quebec in Montreal, The Village Performing Arts Centre in Sydney and New York University (among others) .

He directed "The Turkish in Italy" and "The Thieving Magpie", both by Rossini, for the Teatro Marrucino of Chieti. Also involved in the collaboration by librettist, he worked with the International Opera Theatre, publishing The Tempest, presented in 2006.

One of his books, The Comic Mask in Commedia dell'Arte published by Andromeda and the Northwestern University Press USA, was translated into English in 2005.[1] Some masks are visible online (https://dc.library.northwestern.edu/search?collection=Commedia+dell%27Arte%3A+The+Masks+of+Antonio+Fava)

Antonio Favas' latest book Vita morte e resurrezione di Pulcinella (Life Death and Resurrection of Pulcinella) first published in Italian in 2014 is a focused study and analysis of Antonio Favas' favourite character from Commedia dell'arte "Pulcinella" and how the character has survived and evolved since he (Pulcinella) first appeared in Commedia dell'arte. There is also a play by the same name that he put on in 2014. [2]
