= Cornelius Conway Felton =

American educator (1807–1862)

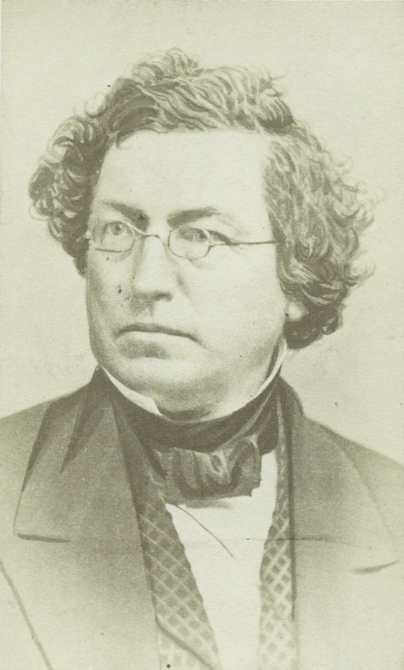

19th President of Harvard University
- In office 1860–1862
- Preceded by: James Walker
- Succeeded by: Thomas Hill

Personal details
- Born: November 6, 1807 West Newbury, Massachusetts, U.S.
- Died: February 26, 1862 (aged 54) Chester, Pennsylvania, U.S.
- Relatives: John B. Felton (brother); Samuel Morse Felton Sr. (brother); Samuel Morse Felton Jr. (nephew)
- Education: Harvard University
- Occupation: Educator

Cornelius Conway Felton (November 6, 1807 – February 26, 1862) was an American educator. He was regent of the Smithsonian Institution, as well as professor of Greek literature and president of Harvard University.

== Early life ==
Felton was born in West Newbury, Massachusetts. He was the brother of Samuel Morse Felton Sr., the half-brother of John B. Felton and the uncle of Samuel Morse Felton Jr.

He graduated from Harvard University in 1827, having taught school in the winter vacations of his sophomore and junior years. During his undergraduate years, he was also a member of the Hasty Pudding student theatrical society.

== Career ==
After teaching in the Livingstone High School of Geneseo, New York, for two years, he became tutor at Harvard in 1829, university professor of Greek in 1832, and Eliot Professor of Greek Literature in 1834. In 1860 he succeeded James Walker as president of Harvard, which position he held until his death.

He was elected a member of the American Antiquarian Society in 1854.

Felton edited many classical texts. His annotations on Wolf's text of the Iliad (1833) are especially valuable. Greece, Ancient and Modern (2 vols., 1867), forty-nine lectures before the Lowell Institute, is scholarly, able and suggestive of the author's personality.

Among his miscellaneous publications are the American edition of Sir William Smith's History of Greece (1855); translations of Menzel's German Literature (1840), of Munk's Metres of the Greeks and Romans (1844), and of Guyot's Earth and Man (1849); and Familiar Letters from Europe (1865).

== Death ==
He died of "disease of the heart" while at his brother's house in Chester, Pennsylvania, en route to a meeting of the Smithsonian Institution in Washington, D.C. He was buried at Mount Auburn Cemetery.

== Legacy ==
A historical marker in the town of West Newbury marks Felton's birthplace.

== Publications ==
- Proceedings of the Massachusetts Historical Society (Boston, 1866)

Academic offices
Preceded by James Walker	President of Harvard University; 1860–1862	Succeeded by Thomas Hill
