= Samuel Morse Felton Jr. =

American railroad executive (1853–1930)

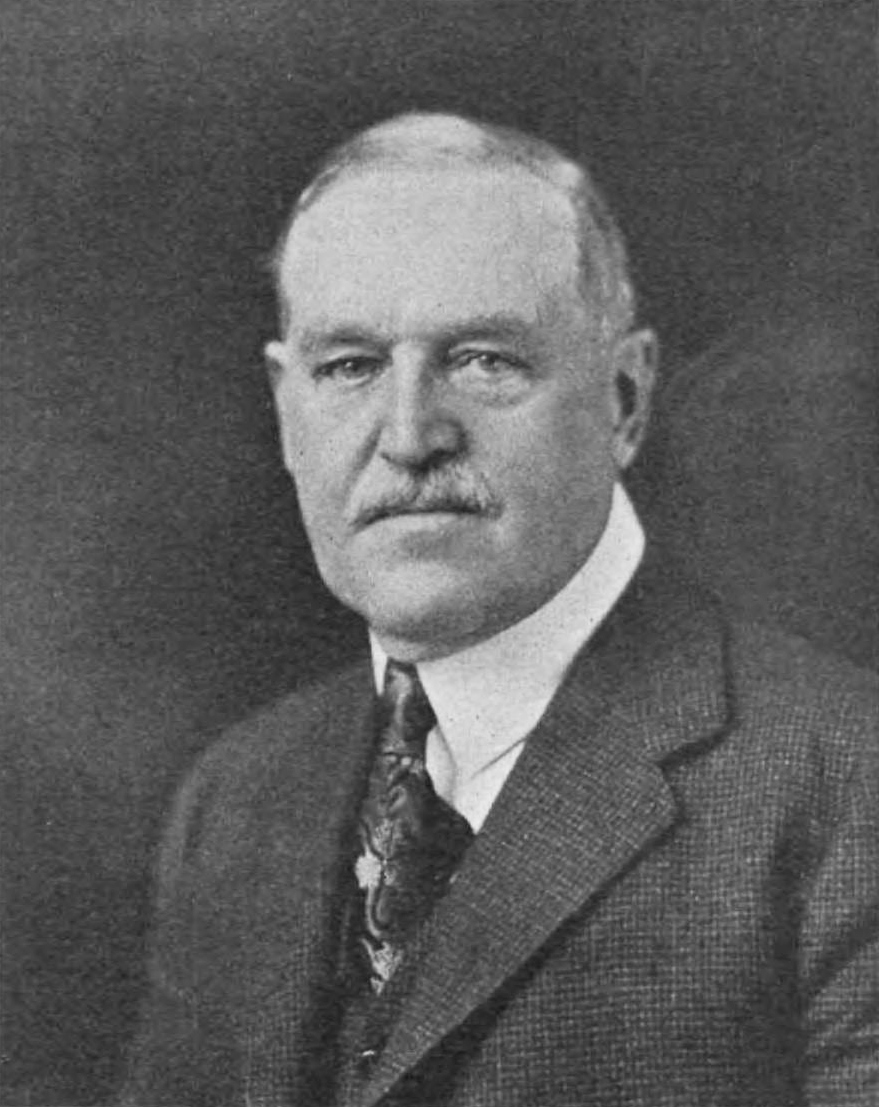
- Born: February 3, 1853; Philadelphia, Pennsylvania, U.S.
- Died: March 11, 1930 (aged 77); Chicago, Illinois, U.S.
- Education: Massachusetts Institute of Technology
- Spouse: Dora Hamilton (m. 1880; died 1923)
- Children: 4
- Father: Samuel Morse Felton Sr.
- Relatives: Cornelius Conway Felton (uncle); John B. Felton (uncle)

Samuel Morse Felton Jr. (February 3, 1853 – March 11, 1930) was an American railroad executive.

== Early life ==
Samuel Morse Felton Jr. was born on February 3, 1853, in Philadelphia, Pennsylvania. Felton was the son of Samuel Morse Felton Sr. (1809-1889), Civil War era influential president of the Philadelphia, Wilmington and Baltimore Railroad (1851-1865) and earlier of the Fitchburg Railroad, and the nephew of Cornelius Conway Felton and John B. Felton.

He was an 1873 graduate of the Massachusetts Institute of Technology, where he was a member of Chi Phi fraternity.

== Career ==
=== Railroad career ===
Felton entered the railroad industry as a rodman in Chester Creek, Pennsylvania, and worked his way up through engineer and superintendent positions. He developed a reputation for being able to rapidly facilitate the health of ailing railroads. He had quite a career as an engineer, superintendent and general manager of several railroads before rising into the presidency of both the Cincinnati, New Orleans and Texas Pacific Railway and Alabama Great Southern Railroad in 1890. He also led the Alton Railroad (1899–1907), the Mexican Central Railroad (1907), the Tennessee Central Railway and the Chicago Great Western Railway (1909–1925), before his own ailing health forced his retirement.

=== Military service ===
During World War I (1914/1917-1918), Felton was appointed Director General of Military Railways with a military rank of brigadier general and in that capacity had charge of the organization and dispatch to France of all American railway forces and supplies for the Western Front. He continued in that position during the World War years. For his service, he was honored with the Distinguished Service Medal by the United States and the Cross of the Legion of Honor by France.

== Personal life ==
In 1880, Felton married Dora Hamilton, the daughter of a prominent Philadelphia attorney, and they had three daughters and a son. Mrs. Felton died in 1923. On November 19, 1929, Felton suffered a heart attack and stroke for which he was hospitalized at Passavant Memorial Hospital. He remained in the hospital until his death on March 11, 1930.

Business positions
Preceded by Timothy B. Blackstone	President of Chicago and Alton Railroad; 1899 – 1907	Succeeded by
Preceded by Alpheus Beede Stickney	President of Chicago Great Western Railway; 1909 – 1925	Succeeded by Nathaniel Lamson Howard
