= Mi Novia =

Painting by Juan Luna

Mi Novia ("My Girlfriend") is a painting by Filipino painter Juan Luna. Created in the academic-style, it was in an exhibition hors concours or not for the purpose of competing for a prize. Instead it was a painting that was aimed to please the viewing public.

== Description ==
In Mi Novia, Luna employed an "ingratiating technique" that is predisposed to stifle the personality of the painter. The woman in Mi Novia resembles the "other ladies of distinction" portrayed by the other so-called Salon painters. It is designed to capture the attention of viewers using "glamorous clichés," such as the "girlish tilt of the head", the "dewy eyes", the "auburn curls" on the forehead, the lacy and ornamental "clots" of pigment of the garment, the slickness of the pictorial surface, the banal and sweet rosiness of the facial expression, and the presence of a "winy purple" background. The painting is full of "obvious" gimmickry that evokes an emotional response from the spectators. The attractive face of the woman in the painted picture was set to make the onlookers’ imagination float or wander "in reverie". The characteristic of Luna's Mi Novia is similar to Félix Resurrección Hidalgo's scholarly portrait of A Girl Carrying a Flowerpot.

According to rumours, this painting is haunted and cursed since Juan Luna was working on it when he killed his wife and mother-in-law using a shotgun due to his suspicions of infidelity.

In spite of Luna's technique and cliché, the Mi Novia painting – together with his other painting the Odalisque – was one of the reasons that made Luna an officially accepted painter at the so-called "Salon of Paris".
