= Samuel Morse Felton Sr. =

American railroad executive (1809–1889)

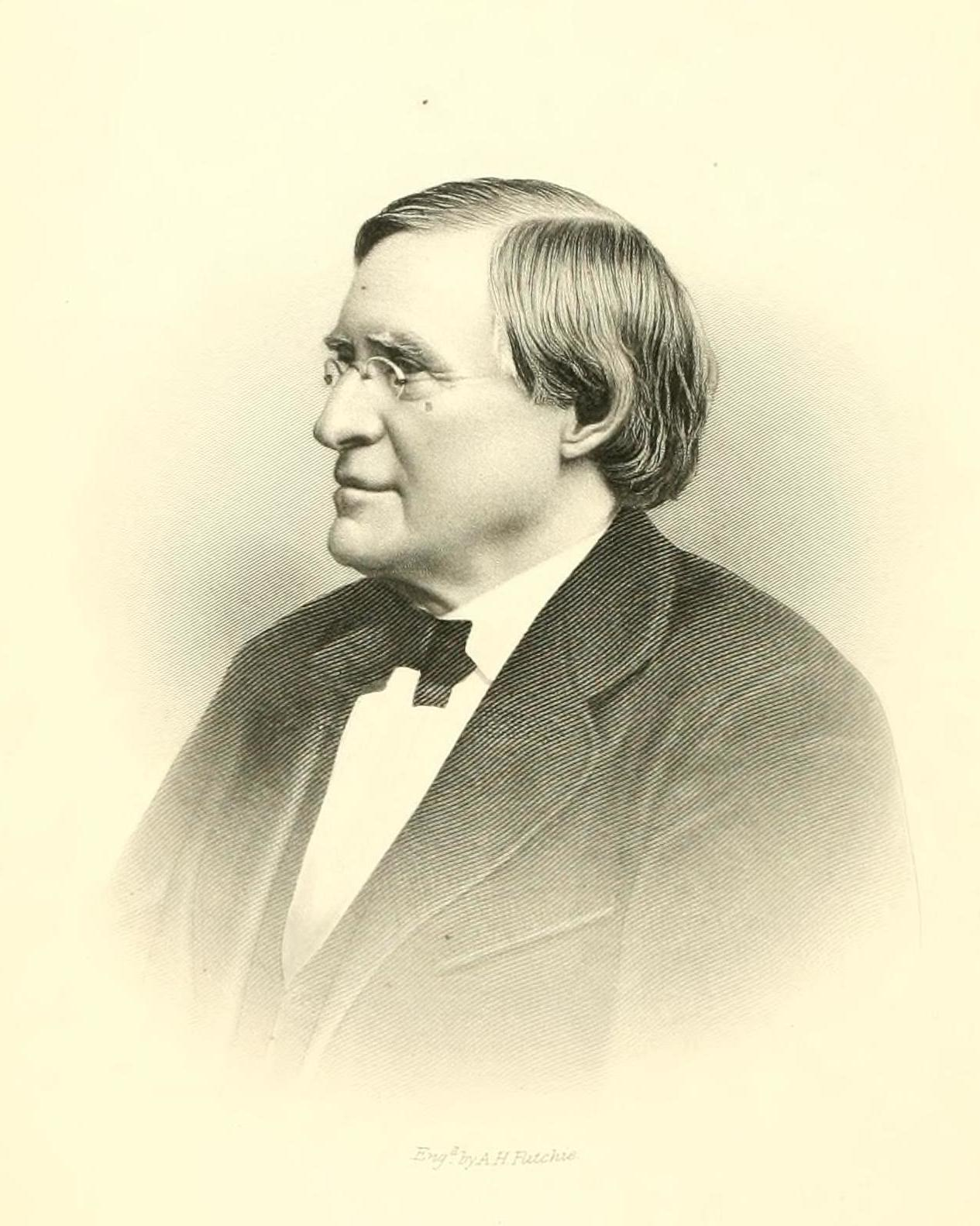
- Born: July 17, 1809; West Newbury, Massachusetts, U.S.
- Died: January 24, 1889 (aged 79); Philadelphia, Pennsylvania, U.S.
- Education: Harvard University
- Occupations: Engineer; Railroad executive
- Spouses: Eleanor Steson (m. 1839; died 1847) Maria Low Lippitt (m. 1850)
- Children: 7, including Samuel Morse Felton Jr.
- Relatives: Cornelius Conway Felton (brother); John B. Felton (brother)

Samuel Morse Felton Sr. (July 17, 1809 – January 24, 1889) was a civil engineer and railroad executive.

== Early life ==
Samuel Morse Felton was born on July 17, 1809, in West Newbury, Massachusetts. At the age of 14, he went into the grocery business and prepared for college. He graduated from Harvard University in 1833.

== Career ==
Felton was the Superintendent and engineer of the Fitchburg Railroad 1843-1851 and president of the Philadelphia, Wilmington and Baltimore Railroad (PW&B) from 1851–1865, during the pivotal American Civil War era. In 1865, he suffered a stroke that left him with paralysis and compelled him to resign his role as President of the PW&B.

A few months after resigning from PW&B, he became the President of the Pennsylvania Steel Company. While at Pennsylvania Steel, Felton also served on the boards of directors of several railroads, including his former Philadelphia, Wilmington and Baltimore Railroad, the Lehigh Coal & Navigation Company, the Northern Pacific Railway, and the Ogdensburg and Lake Champlain Railroad. In 1869 he was appointed by 18th President Ulysses S. Grant (1822-1885, served 1869-1877), as a Commissioner to inspect the trans-continental and Pacific Railroads. He was also appointed by Governor John Albion Andrew as a member of the Hoosac Tunnel Commission.

He was elected as a member to the American Philosophical Society in 1854.

== Personal life ==
Felton married Eleanor Stetson in 1839, and together they had three daughters. She died in 1847. In 1850, he married Maria Low Lippitt. Together, they had one daughter and three sons. One of his sons, Samuel Morse Felton Jr. (1853-1930), was also involved like his father with engineering and railroading with several different lines and supervised railroad operations in France on the Western Front in World War I (1914/1917-1918).

Felton was the brother of Harvard College / Harvard University president Cornelius Conway Felton in Cambridge, Massachusetts, and attorney John B. Felton.

He died on January 24, 1889, in Philadelphia.
