= Lucius Pomponius =

Roman dramatist

Lucius Pomponius (fl. c. 90 BC or earlier) was a Roman dramatist. Called Bononiensis (“native of Bononia” (i.e. Bologna), Pomponius was a writer of Atellanae Fabulae (Atellan Fables), and a near contemporary of Quintus Novius. Pomponius was the first to give artistic dignity to the Atellan Fables by making them less improvised and providing the actors with a script (written in the metrical forms and technical rules of the Greeks) and a predetermined plot. Pomponius’ skill in the utilization of rustic, obscene, quotidian, alliterative, punning, and farcical language was remarked on by Macrobius in his Saturnalia, as well as by Seneca and Marcus Velleius Paterculus. His work included political, religious, social, and mythological satires.

== Surviving Titles and Fragments ==
Some of the titles of the seventy works attributed to him are:

- Aleones ("The Gamblers")
- Bucco Adoptatus
- Bucco Auctoratus
- Capella ("The She-Goat")
- Citharista
- Collegium ("The College," or "The Guild")
- Concha
- Condiciones ("The Contracts")
- Decuma
- Dives ("The Rich Man")
- Fullones ("The Cloth-Fullers")
- Heres Petitor
- Hirnea Pappi ("Pappus's Jug")
- Kalendae Martiae ("The First Day of March")
- Lar Familiaris
- Leno ("The Pimp")
- Macchus Miles ("Macchus the Soldier")
- Macchus Sequester
- Macchus Virgo ("Macchus the Virgin")
- Medicus ("The Physician")
- Munda
- Nuptiae ("The Wedding")
- Pannuceati
- Pappus Agricola ("Pappus the Farmer")
- Pappus Praeteritus ("Pappus the Departed," not to be confused with the eponymous of Quintus Novius)
- Parci ("Stingy Men")
- Patruus ("The Paternal Uncle")
- Philosophia ("Philosophy")
- Pictores ("The Painters")
- Piscatores ("The Fishermen")
- Pistor ("The Baker")
- Placenta ("The Cake")
- Porcetra
- Praeco Posterior
- Praefectus Morum ("Supervisor of Morals")
- Prostibulum ("The Prostitute")
- Pseudo-Agamemnon (“Supposititious Agamemnon”)
- Pytho Gorgonius
- Quinquatrus
- Rusticus ("The Country-Dweller")
- Sarcularia
- Satura ("The Satire")
- Sponsa Pappi ("Pappus's Fiancee")
- Synepheboi (Fellow Adolescents")
- Syri ("The Syrians")
- Vacca vel Marsuppium ("The Cow" or "The Pouch")
- Verniones
- Verres Aegrotus ("Sick Verres")
- Verres Salvos ("Healthy Verres")
- Marsyas

== Sources ==
- Meyer, Maurice, “Études sur le théâtre latin”
- Imago Mundi -Atellanes
