= Farce =

Comedy genre

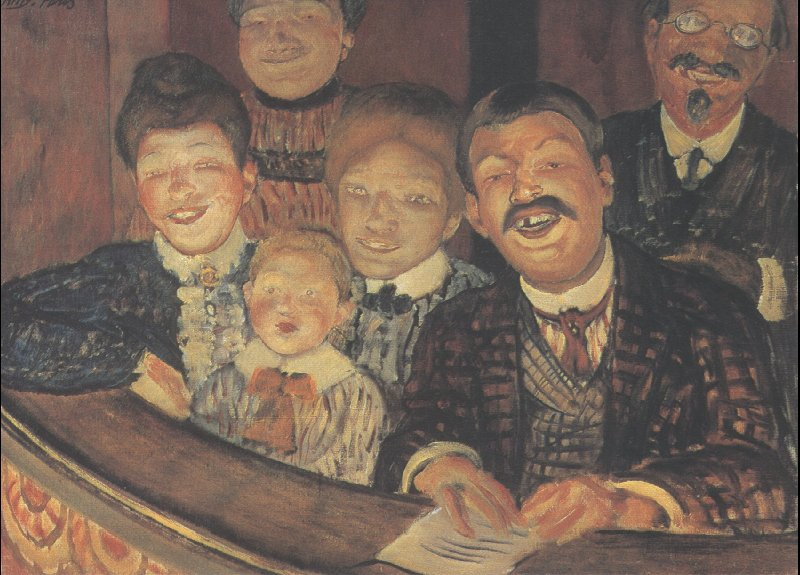
Petrov-Vodkin's Theatre. Farce. (1907)

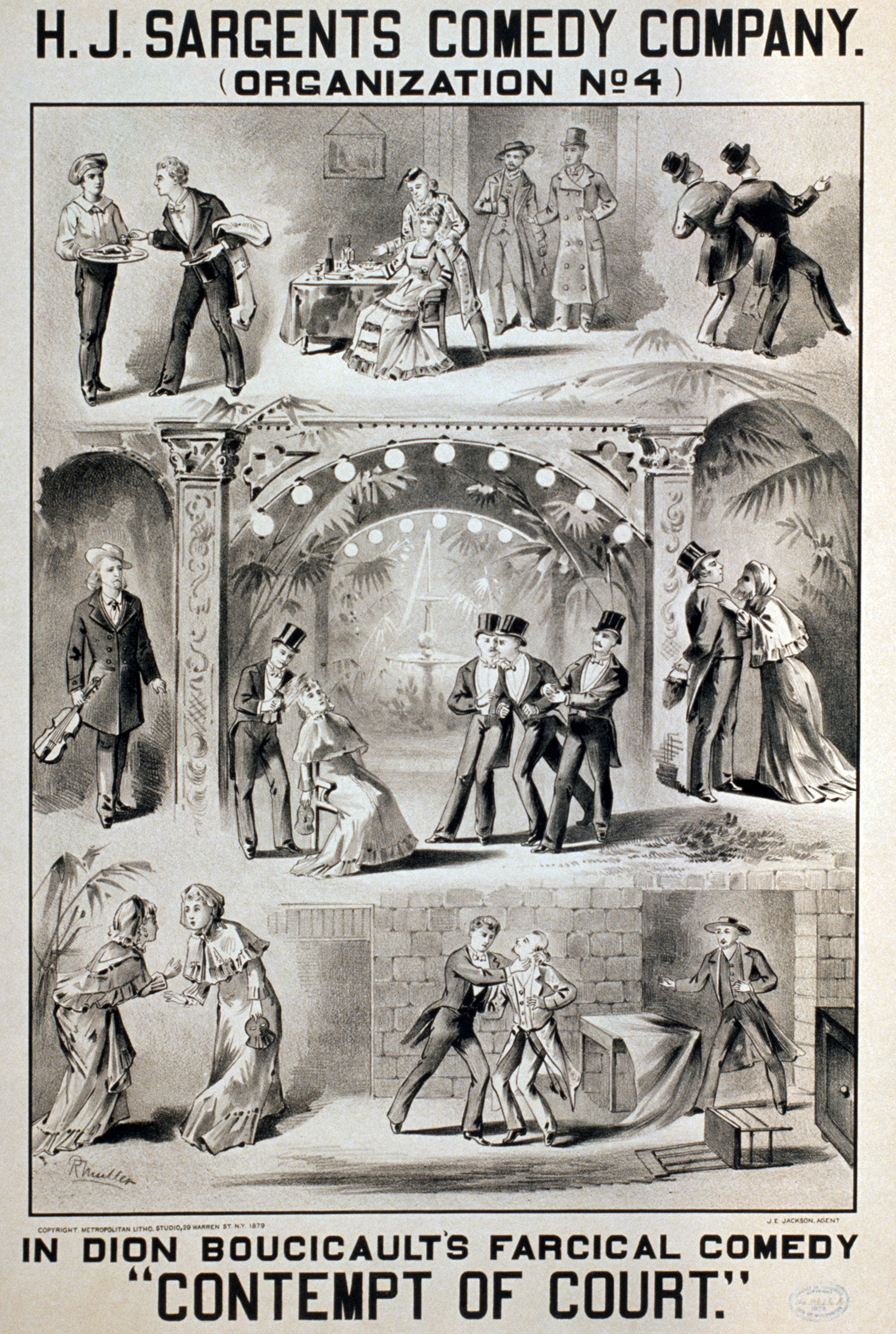
Poster for a production of Boucicault's farce Contempt of Court, c. 1879

Farce is a form of comedy that relies on amusing and highly implausible plots, stereotyped or exaggerated characters, physical humor and misunderstandings to entertain an audience. It originated in masked improvised farces in Ancient Rome, rose in popularity from the late 13th century, and continues to this date in theatre, film and television.

== Genre ==
Farce can be seen as low comedy or even "lower than comedy". It uses bawdiness, absurdity, satire, parody, tongue-in-cheek humor and physical comedy. Farces are typically written with a fast-paced plot, delivered with a manic energy and increasing speed towards its denouement.

The dramatic roles may be made up of stereotypes, stock characters or broad, larger-than-life characters, often calling for highly stylized performances and dramatic reactions. There may be wordplay, visual gags and slapstick, requiring the need for adept comic timing by the actors.

The action often portrays ludicrous scenarios, mistaken identities and misunderstandings. It frequently employs dramatic irony, where the audience is fully aware of the hidden truths, mistakes or missed connections but the characters themselves are not. This may include features such as slamming doors and quick entrances and exits, whereby characters just miss each other. There may also be masks, disguise, concealed identities, and characters swapping gender or social roles, often to pursue a romantic interest or financial outcome that they could not achieve as themselves.

Despite involving absurd situations and characters, the genre generally maintains at least a slight degree of realism and narrative continuity within the context of the irrational or ridiculous situations, often distinguishing it from completely absurdist or fantastical genres. Farces are often episodic or short in duration, and set in one specific location where all events occur.

Farces have historically been performed for the stage and film, and can be improvised or scripted. Types of farce include backstage farces, tragic farces and bedroom farces.

== Historical context ==
The term farce is derived from the French word for "stuffing", in reference to improvisations applied by actors to medieval religious dramas.

Atellan play is the "earliest native Italian farce", which originated in Italy by 300 B.C. They were subject to objections and suppression by the emperor Tiberius, who brought a motion against them.

Farces rose dramatically in popularity in the late Middle Ages. The majority of these plays came from France and Germany and are similar in tone and form, emphasizing sex and bodily excretions.

Later forms of this drama were performed as comical interludes during the 15th and 16th centuries. The oldest surviving farce may be Le Garçon et l'aveugle (The Boy and the Blind Man) from after 1266, although the earliest farces that can be dated come from between 1450 and 1550. The best known farce is La Farce de maître Pathelin (The Farce of Master Pathelin) from c. 1460, although, at some 1500 verses long, it is among the most unusual. The entire repertoire of typically shorter pieces experienced a heyday in medieval and Renaissance France, where over 200 such comedies survive. Over 70 of these have been translated into English, many of which can be found in these anthologies:

- Axton, Richard, and John Stevens, trans. Medieval French Plays. Oxford: Basil Blackwell, 1971.
- Boucquey, Thierry, trans. Six Medieval French Farces. Lewiston, N.Y.: Edwin Mellen, 1999.
- Denny, Neville, ed. and trans. Medieval Interludes. London: Ginn, 1972.
- Enders, Jody, ed. and trans. "The Farce of the Fart" and Other Ribaldries: Twelve Medieval French Plays in Modern English. The Middle Ages Series. Philadelphia: University of Pennsylvania Press, 2011.
- Enders, Jody. "Holy Deadlock" and Further Ribaldries: Another Dozen Medieval French Plays in Modern English. The Middle Ages Series. Philadelphia: University of Pennsylvania Press, 2017.
- Enders, Jody, ed. and trans. Immaculate Deception and Further Ribaldries: Yet Another Dozen Medieval French Plays in Modern English. Philadelphia: University of Pennsylvania Press, 2022.
- Enders, Jody, ed. and trans. Trial by Farce: A Dozen Medieval French Comedies in Modern English for the Stage. Ann Arbor: University of Michigan Press, 2023.
- Mandel, Oscar, trans. Five Comedies of Medieval France. 1970; rpt. Boston and London: University Press of America, 1982.

Spoof films such as Spaceballs, a comedy based on the Star Wars movies, are farces.

Sir George Grove opined that the "farce" began as a canticle in the common French tongue intermixed with Latin. It became a vehicle for satire and fun, and thus led to the modern Farsa or Farce, a piece in one act, the subject of which is extravagant and the action ludicrous.

In France, comic plays were enlivened through music that included popular vaudeville songs. This gave birth to the genre known as comédie en vaudevilles, that appeared in the late 17th century and eventually spun off into the form of variety show known in the Anglo-Saxon world as vaudeville. In France, music gradually became less prominent in comic plays, and by the second half of the 19th century the name vaudeville became associated with a type of theatrical farce. Eugène Scribe is credited with developing the genre through so-called well-made plays that involved more structured plots and less broad humor. The "French farce" genre, whose other classic authors include Eugène Labiche and Georges Feydeau, is often based on social satire, particularly of the bourgeoisie. It typically uses plot devices involving misunderstandings, and awkward romantic or sexual situations such as adultery, with many plays falling into the category of bedroom farces. The contemporary French vaudeville is commonly associated with boulevard theatre venues, to the extent that théâtre de boulevard (boulevard theatre) has become synonymous with it in French. Notable 20th century examples of that genre include such sex comedies as La Cage aux Folles by Jean Poiret, and Boeing Boeing by Marc Camoletti.

== See also ==
- Commedia dell'arte
- Bedroom farce
- Pantomime
- Punch and Judy
- Screwball comedy
