= Eduard Munk =

German philologist

Eduard Munk (14 January 1803 – 3 May 1871) was a German philologist. He was a cousin of Salomon Munk.

Munk was born in Gross-Glogau. He studied from 1822 to 1825 at Breslau and Berlin, and was a favorite disciple of August Böckh. Munk was active as teacher, officiating from 1827 to 1848 at the Royal Wilhelmsschule at Breslau, and from 1850 to 1857 intermittently at the gymnasium of Glogau, and afterward as a private tutor. In 1862 he received the title of professor.

Munk was a profound student of classical literature. Though without any prospects of a university professorship, on account of his Jewish religion, he nevertheless devoted all his life exclusively to study, the result of which he gave to the world in numerous works.

Munk died in Gross-Glogau. He was an earnest student of Judaism and a faithful Jew.

== Works ==
- "Die Metrik der Griechen und Römer" (Glogau, 1834) – translated into English and published as "The metres of the Greeks and Romans" (1844).
- "De Fabulis Atellanis" (Leipzig, 1840)
- "Geschichte der Griechischen Literatur" (Berlin, 1849–50; 3d ed. by Volkmann, 1879–80) – Chapters translated into English by D.B. Kitchin and published as "The student's manual of Greek tragedy" (1891).
- "Die Natürliche Ordnung der Platonischen Schriften" (Berlin, 1857)
- "Geschichte der Römischen Literatur" (ib. 1858–61; 2d ed. by Oskar Seyffert, 2 vols., 1875–77).

Some of Munk's works have been translated into English, Spanish, and Russian.
