= John B. Felton =

American politician

John Brooks Felton
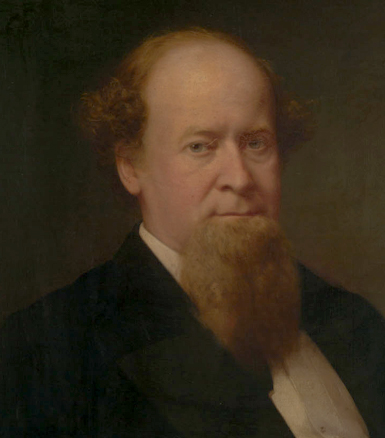
- John Brooks Felton, c. 1854 by Stephen W. Shaw

14th Mayor of Oakland, California
- In office March 1, 1869 – March 5, 1870
- Preceded by: Samuel Merritt
- Succeeded by: Nathaniel W. Spaulding

Personal details
- Born: June 9, 1827 Saugus, Massachusetts, U.S.
- Died: May 2, 1877 (aged 49) Oakland, California, U.S.
- Resting place: Mountain View Cemetery (Oakland, California)
- Party: Republican
- Spouse: Kate S. Baldwin (m. 1862)
- Children: 2
- Relatives: Cornelius Conway Felton (brother); Samuel Morse Felton, Sr. (brother)
- Education: Harvard University; Cambridge University (L.L.B.)
- Occupation: Lawyer; Politician

John Brooks Felton (June 9, 1827 – May 2, 1877) was an American jurist and politician who served as the 14th mayor of Oakland, California.

== Early life ==
John Brooks Felton was born on June 9, 1827, in Saugus, Massachusetts. Felton was the son of an almshouse superintendent in Cambridge, Massachusetts, and brother of Cornelius Conway Felton, a classics scholar at Harvard University and Samuel Morse Felton, Sr., a railroad executive. He graduated from Harvard in 1847 with a Bachelor's degree and briefly served as a Greek tutor before pursuing the law. He graduated with a Bachelor of Laws from Cambridge University in 1853. He studied the Napoleonic Code in Paris for one year and became fluent in French and Spanish.

== Career ==
In 1854, Felton moved to San Francisco to open a law practice with Harvard classmate, E.J. Pringle. The firm, which was later joined by A. C. Whitcomb, became known for successfully litigating land claims and their clients included Kelsey Hazen, Joseph Yves Limantour, and James Lick. Future Congressman Binger Hermann apprenticed under Felton before moving to Oregon. Felton was a legal advisor to Levi Parsons of the San Francisco Dock and Wharf Company during Parsons' attempt to have the "Bulkhead Bill" passed. He was involved in San Francisco's "City Slip" cases, the Peter Smith suits, and the Limantour Grant.

Felton campaigned unsuccessfully for a seat in the U.S. Senate in 1867 and 1874. He was Mayor of Oakland from 1869 to 1870 and a Presidential Elector for California during the 1868, 1872, and 1876 Presidential Elections.

Felton was the first President of the Board of Trustees of Toland Medical College (now University of California, San Francisco) and was tasked with obtaining the school's charter, which he failed to do. He was a regent of the University of California from its inception in 1868 until his death. Felton also served as the President of the San Francisco and Oakland Railroad.

== Personal life ==
He married Kate S. Baldwin in 1862. She was the daughter of Joseph G. Baldwin, his law partner who served on the California Supreme Court. Together, they had two daughters.

== Death ==
Felton died from paralysis on May 2, 1877, at his home in Oakland at the age of 49. He was buried at the Mountain View Cemetery.

== Legacy ==
The town of Felton, CA, is named after John Brooks Felton.

Political offices
Preceded by Samuel Merritt	Mayor of Oakland, California; 1869—1870	Succeeded by Nathaniel W. Spaulding
