= Atellan Farce =

Genre of comedy from ancient Latin theatre

The Atellan Farce (Latin: Atellanae Fabulae or Fabulae Atellanae, "favola atellana"; Atellanicum exhodium, "Atella comedies",) also known as the Oscan Games (Latin: ludi Osci, "Oscan plays"), were masked improvised farces in Ancient Rome. The Oscan athletic games were very popular, and usually preceded by longer pantomime plays. The origin of the Atellan Farce is uncertain, but the farces are similar to other forms of ancient theatre such as the South Italian Phlyakes, the plays of Plautus and Terence, and Roman mime. Most historians believe the name is derived from Atella, an Oscan town in Campania. The farces were written in Oscan and imported to Rome in 391 B.C. In later Roman versions, only the ridiculous characters speak their lines in Oscan, while the other characters speak in Latin.

== History and surviving evidence ==
The Atellan Farce was a masked farce that originated in Italy by 300 B.C.and remained popular for more than 500 years. Originally, the farces were improvised and not recorded. Evidence of the original forms is scarce, primarily found in the depictions of scenes and characters on ancient vases.

The extant literary evidence contains only fragments of the Atellan Farce with 400 lines and the titles of approximately 115 farces are recorded from the first century B.C. by the dramatists Lucius Pomponius and Quintus Novius. With the evidence that does remain, historians believe the plays were between 300 and 400 lines and lasted from 15 to 28 minutes.

Surviving titles indicate that the Atellana or short sketches were meant to entertain the audience on holidays and market days. The names of some of these extant titles include The Farmer, The She-goat, The Woodpile, and The Vine-Gatherers. While the actors in Atellan Farce were known to be Oscan, evidence of language-switching from Oscan to Latin is evident in a literary Atellana. We can also surmise that the plots of the sketches included ridiculous situations consisting of puns, horseplay, and riddles of a vulgar and crude nature.

== Stock characters and origins ==
Some of the hypothesized stock characters included:

- Maccus – Believed derived from either the Greek term makkoan, meaning "to be stupid" or the Greek prefix mac-, that denotes greed. The character Maccus makes the most appearances of all stock characters in the works of Pomponius and Novius and includes the play Maccus The Maid where confusion ensues from "twin subjects". Maccus was a most popular clown and the leading character in many Atellan plays including The Fool, as a hunchback with a beak nose.
- Buccus – Although the origin of this name is not definitely known, the Latin word bucca, meaning "cheek" or "mouth" is a common consideration, and implies a "country booby" "fat- cheeked, gluttonous braggart".
- Manducus – Deriving from the Latin for "The chewer", Manducus is a hypothesized stock character that does not appear in any of the surviving titles Possibly Manducus and Dossennus are the same character and Manducus is simply the description for Dossennus. as the arrogant soldier.
- Pappus – The name is considered derived from the Greek pappos meaning "grandfather". Pappus was easy to deceive, often falling victim to either his daughter or wife. The character appears in five extant plays. Pappus is the only character from Atellan Farce who has a name of Oscan origin as the old man.
- Centunculus – The name of a comic slave
- Dossennus – The origin of the name Dossennus is believed to have originated from the word dorsum or "back" as the character was hump-backed, as the pompous doctor or "hump backed, crafty cheat".

The characters may have connections to similar roles in Commedia dell'arte and Punch and Judy. Both Atellan Farce and Commedia were improvised masked comedies. Stock characters in Atellan Farce are speculated as the beginnings of the Commedia dell'arte stock characters. For example, theorized character progressions include:

- Pappus → Pantalone
- Maccus + Buccus → Pulcinella
- Manducus → il Capitano

However, these connections remain speculative and are contested in ongoing research. There are similarities between Punch and the Commedia dell'arte character Pulcinella. However, there is no consensus that Punch's derivation can be traced back to Pulcinella. The character Cicirrus, the Oscan word for "gamecock", is thought to be a stock character.

== Authorship ==
The subjects and characters were decided upon just before the performance began and the dialogue was improvised. The performers were the sons of Roman citizens who were allowed to serve in the army: professional actors were excluded. The simple prose dialogues were supplemented by songs in Saturnian metre, the common language, accompanied by lively gesticulation. The plays were characterized by coarseness and obscenity. Atellan play acting contained much pantomiming. All roles were played by males. The plays did not have elaborate scenery and were performed in normal theaters.

Atellan plays first became popular in Rome in the third century B.C, with a revived popularity in literary form in the first century B.C. and included the stock characters in written verse.

Later, the dictator Sulla wrote some Atellan Fables. The dramatist Quintus Novius, who lived and wrote 50 years after the abdication of Sulla, wrote fifty fables, including Macchus Exul (Exiled Macchus), Gallinaria (The Henhouse), Surdus (The Deaf One), Vindemiatores (The Harvesters), and Parcus (The Treasurer). When the Atellan plays were revived in the first century B.C. professional actors were no longer excluded from playing the stock character roles.

Influenced by Palliata Fabius Dorsennus, Lucius Pomponius of Bologna composed several Atellan plays, including Macchus Miles (Macchus the Soldier), Pytho Gorgonius, Pseudoagamemnon, Bucco Adoptatus, and Aeditumus. Quintus Novius and a "Memmius" also authored these comedies. Ovid and Pliny the Younger found the work of Memmius to be indecent.

Pomponius is speculated to be the "founder" of the Atellan Farce plays.

== Controversy and suppression ==
Taken from Tacitus (Annals, 4.14.3): "...after various and often fruitless complaints from the praetors, the emperor Tiberius finally brought forward a motion about the licentious behavior of the players. 'They had often', he said 'sought to disturb the public peace, and to bring disgrace on private families, and the old Oscan farce, once a wretched amusement for the vulgar, had become at once so indecent and popular, that it must be checked by the Senate's authority.' The players, upon this, were banished from Italy."

Suetonius (Tiberius, 45, 1) reports that Tiberius was mocked for his lecherous habits in an Atellan farce, after which the saying "the old goat lapping up the doe" (hircum vetulum capreis naturam ligurire) became popular.

In the 20s A.D., the growth in popularity and revival of the Atellan plays was met with the disapproval of an older generation of patricians and senators. The performances became so obnoxious that, in 28 A.D., all who performed in the farces were banished from Italy.

Nonetheless, a mask portraying Pappus appears in a fresco unearthed in the ruins at Pompeii that dates to the volcanic eruption in 79 A.D. that covered the city in ash.

The Augustan History records that Hadrian furnished performances of Atellan Farces at banquets.

== Contemporary comparisons ==
Due to the outlandish nature and brevity that the Atellan Farces are believed to have, they are comparable to the sketches that one would see on a variety show such as Saturday Night Live or Whose Line Is It Anyway? Oftentimes the improvised play would center on an uncomplicated situation such as eating too much, becoming intoxicated, or stealing.

== See also ==
- Improvisational comedy
- Improvisational theatre
- Theatre of ancient Rome

== Ancient and modern sources ==
- Fragments of the Atellan Fables can be found in the Poetarum latinorum scen. fragmenta, Leipzig, 1834
- Maurice Meyer, Sur les Atellanes; Manheim, 1826, in-8°;
- C. E. Schober, Über die Atellanen, Leipzig, 1825, in-8°;
- M. Meyer, Etudes sur le théâtre latin, Paris, 1847, in-8°.
- Jürgen Blänsdorf “Atellana fabula”, in: Brill's New Pauly, Antiquity volumes edited by: Hubert Cancik and Helmuth Schneider. Consulted online on 21 July 2017

The works of Pomponius and Novius may be found in

- Otto Ribbeck, Comicorum Romanorum praeter Plautum et Terentium Fragmenta
- Eduard Munk, De Fabulis Atellanis (1840).
