= Quintus Novius =

Roman dramatist

Quintus Novius (fl. 30 BC), was a Roman dramatist, and composer of Atellanae Fabulae (Atellan Fables). His efforts seem to have been directed towards giving literary dignity to this form of drama without diminishing their popular quality and traditional cast of characters. He is known to have written his works around the same time as Lucius Pomponius, who also wrote Atellanae Fabulae; Macrobius makes reference to him as a very well-esteemed writer whose atellaniolae ("little Atellans") found a receptive audience.

Some of Novius' known works, among the forty-three that are attributed to him, include:

- Agricola ("The Farmer")
- Asinus ("The Donkey")
- Buccolo ("Little Bucco")
- Dotata ("The Lady Who Received Her Dowry")
- Eculeus ("The Foal")
- Exodium
- Fullones ("The Cloth-Fullers")
- Fullones Feriati ("Cloth-Fullers on Holiday")
- Funus ("The Funeral")
- Gallinaria ("The Henhouse")
- Gemini ("The Twins")
- Hercules Coactor ("Hercules the Money-Collector")
- Hetaera ("The Courtesan")
- Lignaria ("The Female Carpenter")
- Macchus Copo ("Macchus the Innkeeper")
- Macchus Exsul ("Macchus the Exile")
- Mania Medica ("Medical Mania")
- Optio ("The Choice")
- Pacilius
- Pappus Praeteritus ("Pappus the Departed," not to be confused with the play by Lucius Pomponius of the same name)
- Parcus ("The Stingy Man")
- Picus ("The Woodpecker")
- Quaestio ("The Trial")
- Sanniones ("The Clowns")
- Surdus (“The Deaf Man”)
- Tabellaria ("The Female Mail-Carrier")
- Togularia
- Tripertita
- Vindemiatores (“The Grape Harvesters”)
- Virgo Praegnans ("The Pregnant Virgin")
- Zona ("The Girdle")

== Sources ==
- Meyer, Maurice, “Études sur le théâtre latin” (1847)
- Imago Mundi -Atellanes
