= Spitting Image (2020 TV series) =

2020 Satirical television puppet show

- Promotional poster for the first series featuring from L–R: Meghan Markle, Prince Harry, Donald Trump, Kanye West and Vladimir Putin.
- Genre: Adult puppeteering; Political satire; Black comedy
- Created by: Peter Fluck; Roger Law; Martin Lambie-Nairn
- Voices of: Billy West; Debra Stephenson; Debra Wilson; Guz Khan; Indira Varma; Jess Robinson; John DiMaggio; Lewis MacLeod; Lobo Chan; Matt Forde; Phil LaMarr; Steve Nallon
- Music by: Willie Dowling
- Country of origin: United Kingdom
- Original language: English
- No. of series: 2 (main series); 1 (The Rest Is Bulls*!t)
- No. of episodes: 20 (main series); 12 (The Rest Is Bulls*!t)

Production
- Executive producers: Jeff Westbrook; Richard Allen-Turner; Joanna Beresford; Roger Law; Jon Thoday; Nana Hughes (Britbox)
- Producer: Matt Stronge
- Running time: 30 minutes (main series); 11–14 minutes (The Rest Is Bulls*!t)
- Production company: Avalon Television

Original release
- Network: BritBox
- Release: 3 October 2020 – 2 December 2021
- Network: YouTube
- Release: 4 July 2025 – present

Spitting Image is a British satirical television puppet show, reviving the 1984 series of the same name created by Peter Fluck, Roger Law and Martin Lambie-Nairn. Similar to the original, the series features puppet caricatures of contemporary celebrities. These include Adele, James Corden, and Kanye West, as well as public figures such as British Prime Minister Boris Johnson, Conservative cabinet members Michael Gove, Dominic Raab and Priti Patel, and US President Donald Trump.

ITV had plans for a reboot in 1983, but these were scrapped after a dispute over the Ant & Dec puppets used to host Best Ever Spitting Image, which were created against Law's wishes. In September 2019, Law announced the show would be returning with a new series. It was confirmed in March 2020 that the show would return on BritBox. Featuring 100 new puppets, the series debuted on 3 October that year. It was renewed for a second series four days later. The second series premiered on 11 September 2021. The show was cancelled by ITV on 24 October 2022, and was revived in July 2025 as a YouTube series titled The Rest Is Bulls*!t.

== Staff ==
=== Voices ===
- Billy West as Joe Biden, Mitch McConnell, Mark Zuckerberg, Rudy Giuliani, and William Shatner
- Debra Stephenson as Elizabeth II
- Debra Wilson as Beyoncé, Michelle Obama, Kamala Harris, Oprah Winfrey, Nicki Minaj, Leondra Kruger, and additional voices
- Guz Khan as Rishi Sunak and Narendra Modi (series 1)
- Indira Varma as Priti Patel
- Jess Robinson as Olivia Colman, Phoebe Waller-Bridge, Meghan Markle, Adele, Melania Trump, Ivanka Trump, Angela Merkel, Nancy Pelosi, Taylor Swift, Kim Kardashian, Jacinda Ardern, Greta Thunberg, Billie Eilish, Grimes, Nicola Sturgeon, Jess Philips, Chrissy Teigen, Gwyneth Paltrow, Ellen DeGeneres, Alexandria Ocasio-Cortez, Emma Raducanu, Ariana Grande, Alex Scott, Jameela Jamil, Carrie Johnson, Katerina Sakellaropoulou, Liz Truss, and Alison Hammond
- John DiMaggio as Mike Pence, Elon Musk, Tom Cruise, Mayor Cheeseburger, and additional voices
- Lewis MacLeod as Prince Charles, Prince Andrew, Michael Gove, Richard Branson, Elton John, Ed Sheeran, David Attenborough, Matt Hancock, Brad Pitt, James Corden, Emmanuel Macron, Vladimir Putin, David Furnish, Scott Morrison, Pope Francis, Coronavirus, Daniel Craig, Tom Hardy, Gareth Southgate, Paul McCartney and Harry Kane (episode 15-present)
- Lobo Chan as Xi Jinping
- Matt Forde as Donald Trump, Boris Johnson, Keir Starmer, Alex Salmond, Phil Foden, Chris Whitty and the Frantic Sole
- Phil LaMarr as Dwayne Johnson, LeBron James, Kevin Hart, Kanye West (series 1, series 2 in episode 16), RuPaul, Barack Obama, Jeff Bezos, Tiger Woods, The Flu, Lin-Manuel Miranda, Santa Claus, and additional voices
- Luke Kempner as Piers Morgan, Jürgen Klopp, Harry Kane (episode 14), Joe Wicks, Bill Gates, Dominic Raab, and Gary Lineker
- Daniel Barker as Dominic Cummings, Prince William, and additional voices
- Jason Forbes as Idris Elba, Marcus Rashford, Lewis Hamilton, and additional voices (series 1)
- George Fouracres as Prince Harry (series 1)
- Clare Corbett as Prince George, Princess Charlotte, Anneliese Dodds, John Healey, Nick Thomas-Symonds, and additional voices (series 1)
- Eshaan Akbar as Rishi Sunak (series 2), Narendra Modi (series 2), and additional voices
- Dane Baptiste as Marcus Rashford (series 2), Trevor McDonald, Kanye West (series 2), Prince Harry (series 2), and Micah Richards (series 2)
- Tom Stourton as Prince Harry (series 2)
- Steve Nallon as the spirit of Margaret Thatcher
- Esmonde Cole as Idris Elba (episode 16), Marcus Rashford (episode 16), Micah Richards (episode 16)

=== Puppeteers ===
- Laura Bacon (series 2)
- Warrick Brownlow-Pike
- Dave Chapman
- Sheila Clark
- Philip Eason (series 1)
- Iestyn Evans
- Joe Greco
- Andy Heath
- Brian Herring
- Matt Hutchinson
- Mark Jefferis
- Steven Kynman (series 1)
- Rebecca Nagan
- Wim Oppenheimer
- Lynn Robertson Bruce (series 1)
- Neil Sterenberg
- Olly Taylor (series 1)
- Chris Thatcher

=== Directors ===
- Steve Bendelack (series 2)
- Steve Connelly (series 1)
- Andy De Emmony (series 1)
- Adam Miller (series 2)
- David Sant (series 2)

=== Writers ===
- Gemma Arrowsmith (series 1)
- David X. Cohen (series 1)
- Sophie Duker (series 1)
- Matt Forde
- Rich Fulcher (series 2)
- Jason Hazely
- Sarah Isaacson (series 2)
- Noah James (series 1)
- Travis Jay (series 1)
- George Jeffrie (deceased before premiere of show, writings released posthumously)
- Laura Major
- F. Maxwell (series 1)
- Jordan Maxwell (series 1)
- Karl Minns
- Al Murray
- Tom Neenan (series 1)
- Pierre Novellie (series 1)
- Bill Odenkirk
- Brona C. Titley
- Nico Tatarowicz
- Bert Tyler-Moore
- Patric M. Verrone
- Phil Wang (series 1)
- Jeff Westbrook
- Keisha Zollar

=== Caricaturists ===
- Jean-Marc Borot
- Steve Brodner (series 1)
- André Carrilho
- Russ Cook
- Thierry Coquelet
- Frank Hoppman
- Sebastian Krüger
- Johannes Leak
- David Stoten
- Adrian Teal
- Tim Watts
- Wilfrid Woods
- Mark Reeve

== Production ==
In April 2017, it was reported that American broadcaster HBO was set to revive the series in light of the presidency of Donald Trump. However, no immediate official confirmation or announcement was made. In September 2019, the show was confirmed to be returning to screens twenty-three years after it originally ended, with the unveiling of the puppets of Trump, Vladimir Putin, Mark Zuckerberg, Prince Harry and Meghan Markle. Roger Law stated that the pilot for the new series had been filmed and that talks were in progress with American networks to take the show to a larger, global audience. According to Law, the revival is set to have a global appeal through a "uniquely British eye". Originally NBC was set to distribute the series in the United States; however, it backed out weeks before its initial broadcast. Executive producer Jon Thoday cited the network's "nervousness" with the series' content as the reason for its departure.

The writers for the revival include Jeff Westbrook, Al Murray, The Windsors creators Bert Tyler-Moore and George Jeffrie, Bill Odenkirk, David X. Cohen, Jason Hazeley, Keisha Zollar, Patric Verrone, Phil Wang, and Sophie Duker.

On 4 March 2020, the show was announced to be returning on the streaming service BritBox, as its first official commission. The show premiered on the service on 3 October 2020, featuring the voice talents of Billy West, Debra Stephenson, Debra Wilson, Guz Khan, Indira Varma, Jess Robinson, John DiMaggio, Lewis MacLeod, Lobo Chan, Matt Forde, and Phil LaMarr.

In an interview from July 2021, Law said that the second series would go massively over-budget like Boris Johnson's policies with full support from BritBox. He also said that the series would not be adding many new political figures, instead adding several footballers.

Following the death of Elizabeth II in September 2022, ITV made the decision to write off £9 million which had been spent on several remaining unaired episodes of Spitting Image; they could not be effectively edited to remove reference to Elizabeth, and it was felt highly unlikely that they would now ever be broadcast.

=== Cancellation and revival ===
In October 2022, it was announced that the revived series had been cancelled by ITV. However, in 2025, the show was revived under the title Spitting Image Presents: The Rest is Bulls*!t (a parody of The Rest Is series by Goalhanger Podcasts), with the first episode releasing to YouTube on 4 July 2025. The series is depicted as a vodcast—presented by Prince Harry and a dishevelled, South American-accented caricature of Paddington Bear—as the hosts interview a variety of guests and commentate on short sketches, with the format designed to take advantage of scrolling-based content platforms.

StudioCanal, who own the rights to the Paddington movies, announced in October 2025 that they—alongside with the estate of creator Michael Bond—have begun legal proceedings against Avalon for design infringement regarding the use of the character.

== Episodes ==
=== Main series (2020–2021) ===
==== Season 1 (2020) ====
No. overall	No. in series	Title	Directed by	Written by	Original release date
1	1	"Episode 1"	Andy De Emmony, Steve Connelly	Gemma Arrowsmith, David X. Cohen, Matt Forde, Jason Hazeley, George Jeffrie, F. Maxwell, Karl Minns, Tom Neenan, Bill Odenkirk, Nico Tatarowicz, Brona C. Titley, Bert Tyler-Moore, Patric M. Verrone, Phil Wang, Jeff Westbrook, Keisha Zollar	3 October 2020
2	2	"Episode 2"	Andy De Emmony, Steve Connelly	David X. Cohen, Sophie Duker, Matt Forde, Jason Hazeley, George Jeffrie, F. Maxwell, Karl Minns, Al Murray, Bill Odenkirk, Nico Tatarowicz, Brona C. Titley, Bert Tyler-Moore, Patric M. Verrone, Jeff Westbrook, Keisha Zollar	10 October 2020
3	3	"Episode 3"	Andy De Emmony, Steve Connelly	David X. Cohen, Matt Forde, Jason Hazeley, Noah James, George Jeffrie, F. Maxwell, Jordan Maxwell, Karl Minns, Al Murray, Bill Odenkirk, Nico Tatarowicz, Brona C. Titley, Bert Tyler-Moore, Patric M. Verrone, Phil Wang, Jeff Westbrook, Keisha Zollar	17 October 2020
4	4	"Episode 4"	Andy De Emmony, Steve Connelly	Gemma Arrowsmith, David X. Cohen, Matt Forde, Jason Hazeley, Laura Major, F. Maxwell, Karl Minns, Al Murray, Bill Odenkirk, Brona C. Titley, Nico Tatarowicz, Bert Tyler-Moore, Patric M. Verrone, Jeff Westbrook, Keisha Zollar	24 October 2020
5	5	"US Election Special (Part 1)"	Andy De Emmony, Steve Connelly	David X. Cohen, Sophie Duker, Matt Forde, Jason Hazeley, George Jeffrie, F. Maxwell, Karl Minns, Al Murray, Bill Odenkirk, Brona C. Titley, Nico Tatarowicz, Bert Tyler-Moore, Patric M. Verrone, Jeff Westbrook, Keisha Zollar	31 October 2020 (Note: Debuted on Britbox, also broadcast on ITV the same day at 10pm.)
6	6	"US Election Special (Part 2)"	Andy De Emmony, Steve Connelly	David X. Cohen, George Jeffrie, F. Maxwell, Karl Minns, Bill Odenkirk, Bert Tyler-Moore, Patric M. Verrone, Jeff Westbrook, Keisha Zollar	31 October 2020
7	7	"Episode 7"	Steve Connelly, Andy De Emmony	David X. Cohen, Sophie Duker, Matt Forde, Jason Hazeley, George Jeffrie, F. Maxwell, Karl Minns, Al Murray, Pierre Novellie, Bill Odenkirk, Brona C. Titley, Nico Tatarowicz, Bert Tyler-Moore, Patric M. Verrone, Jeff Westbrook, Keisha Zollar	7 November 2020
8	8	"Episode 8"	Steve Connelly, Andy De Emmony	Gemma Arrowsmith, David X. Cohen, Matt Forde, Jason Hazeley, George Jeffrie, F. Maxwell, Karl Minns, Al Murray, Tom Neenan, Bill Odenkirk, Brona C. Titley, Nico Tatarowicz, Bert Tyler-Moore, Patric M. Verrone, Jeff Westbrook, Keisha Zollar	14 November 2020
9	9	"Episode 9"	Steve Connelly, Andy De Emmony	David X. Cohen, Matt Forde, Jason Hazeley, Travis Jay, George Jeffrie, Laura Major, F. Maxwell, Karl Minns, Al Murray, Bill Odenkirk, Brona C. Titley, Nico Tatarowicz, Bert Tyler-Moore, Patric M. Verrone, Jeff Westbrook, Keisha Zollar	21 November 2020
10	10	"Episode 10"	Steve Connelly, Andy De Emmony	David X. Cohen, Matt Forde, Jason Hazeley, George Jeffrie, Laura Major, F. Maxwell, Karl Minns, Al Murray, Bill Odenkirk, Brona C. Titley, Nico Tatarowicz, Bert Tyler-Moore, Patric M. Verrone, Jeff Westbrook, Keisha Zollar	28 November 2020

==== Season 2 (2021) ====
No. overall	No. in series	Title	Directed by	Written by	Original release date
11	1	"Episode 1"	Steve Bendelack, Adam Miller	Matt Forde, Jason Hazeley, Sarah Isaacson, Laura Major, Karl Minns, Sarah Morgan, Megan Neuringer, Bill Odenkirk, Matt Stronge, Nico Tatarowicz, Brona C. Titley, Bert Tyler-Moore, Patric M. Verrone, Jeff Westbrook	11 September 2021
12	2	"Episode 2"	Adam Miller, Steve Bendelack, David Sant	Catherine Brinkworth, Matt Forde, Jason Hazeley, Rich Fulcher, Laura Major, Karl Minns, Al Murray, Bill Odenkirk, Elizabeth V. Suggs, Nico Tatarwicz, Brona C. Titley, Bert Tyler-Moore, Patric M. Verrone, Jeff Westbrook	18 September 2021
13	3	"Episode 3"	Steve Bendelack, Adam Miller	Catherine Brinkworth, Matt Forde, Jason Hazeley, Sarah Isaacson, George Jeffrie, Laura Major, Karl Minns, Megan Neuringer, Bill Odenkirk, Nico Tartowicz, Bert Tyler-Moore, Patric M. Verrone, Jeff Westbrook, Keisha Zollar	25 September 2021
14	4	"Episode 4"	Adam Miller, Steve Bendelack, David Sant	Catherine Brinkworth, Matt Forde, Jason Hazeley, Sarah Isaacson, Laura Major, Karl Minns, Sarah Morgan, Megan Neuringer, Bill Odenkirk, Elizabeth V. Suggs, Matt Stronge, Nico Tatarowicz, Brona C. Titley, Bert Tyler-Moore, Patric M. Verrone, Jeff Westbrook, Keisha Zollar	2 October 2021
15	5	"Episode 5"	Steve Bendelack, Adam Miller	Catherine Brinkworth, Matt Forde, Jason Hazeley, Sarah Isaacson, Laura Major, Karl Minns, Al Murray, Megan Neuringer, Bill Odenkirk, Nico Tatarowicz, Brona C. Titley, Bert Tyler-Moore, Patric M. Verrone, Jeff Westbrook, Keisha Zollar	9 October 2021
16	6	"Episode 6"	Adam Miller, Steve Bendelack, David Sant	Catherine Brinkworth, Matt Forde, Rich Fulcher, Jason Hazeley, Sarah Isaacson, Laura Major, Karl Minns, Sarah Morgan, Megan Neuringer, Bill Odenkirk, Nico Tatarowicz, Brona C. Titley, Bert Tyler-Moore, Patric M. Verrone, Jeff Westbrook, Keisha Zollar	16 October 2021
17	7	"Episode 7"	Steve Bendelack, Adam Miller, David Sant	Catherine Brinkworth, Matt Forde, Rich Fulcher, Jason Hazeley, Sarah Isaacson, Laura Major, Karl Minns, Sarah Morgan, Tom Neenan, Megan Neuringer, Bill Odenkirk, Nico Tatarowicz, Bert Tyler-Moore, Patric M. Verrone, Jeff Westbrook	22 October 2021
18	8	"Halloween Special"	Adam Miller, Steve Bendelack, David Sant	Catherine Brinkworth, Matt Forde, Jason Hazeley, Sarah Isaacson, Laura Major, Karl Minns, Al Murray, Sarah Morgan, Megan Neuringer, Bill Odenkirk, Nico Tatarowicz, Brona C. Titley, Bert Tyler-Moore, Patric M. Verrone, Jeff Westbrook, Keisha Zollar	30 October 2021 (Note: Premiered on BritBox and ITV at the same time at 9:30pm)
19	9	"Episode 9"	Steve Bendelack, Adam Miller	Catherine Brinkworth, Matt Forde, Jason Hazeley, Sarah Isaacson, Laura Major, Karl Minns, Tom Neenan, Megan Neuringer, Bill Odenkirk, Matt Stronge, Nico Tatarowicz, Bert-Tyler Moore, Patric M. Verrone, Jeff Westbrook, Keisha Zollar	6 November 2021
20	10	"Spitting Image: Christmas Special 2021"	Steve Bendelack, Adam Miller	Matt Forde, Jason Hazeley, Laura Major, Karl Minns, Al Murray, Sarah Morgan, Nico Tatarowicz, Brona C. Titley, Bert-Tyler Moore, Patric M. Verrone, Jeff Westbrook	2 December 2021 (Note: Premiered on 24 December on ITV)

=== The Rest is Bulls*!t (2025–present) ===
==== Season 1 (2025) ====
No. overall	No. in series	Title	Directed by	Written by	Original release date
1	1	"Episode 1"	Matt Stronge	Al Murray, Matt Forde	4 July 2025
2	2	"Episode 2"	Matt Stronge	Al Murray, Matt Forde	19 September 2025
3	3	"Episode 3"	Matt Stronge	Al Murray, Matt Forde	26 September 2025
4	4	"Episode 4"	Matt Stronge	Al Murray, Matt Forde	3 October 2025
5	5	"Episode 5"	Matt Stronge	Al Murray, Matt Forde	10 October 2025
6	6	"Episode 6"	Matt Stronge	Al Murray, Matt Forde	17 October 2025
7	7	"Episode 7"	Matt Stronge	Al Murray, Matt Forde	24 October 2025
8	8	"Episode 8"	Matt Stronge	Al Murray, Matt Forde	31 October 2025
9	9	"Episode 9"	Matt Stronge	Al Murray, Matt Forde	7 November 2025
10	10	"Episode 10"	Matt Stronge	Al Murray, Matt Forde	14 November 2025
11	11	"Episode 11"	Matt Stronge	Al Murray, Matt Forde	21 November 2025
12	12	"Episode 12"	Matt Stronge	Al Murray, Matt Forde	5 December 2025

== Reception ==
The first series received mixed reviews from critics. The decision to satirise Greta Thunberg garnered criticism as she was a minor at the time.

Mark Lawson of The Guardian wrote approvingly in his four-out-of-five star review that "[a]dmirers of the franchise will be relieved that the revival ... has lost none of its savagery or willingness to shock." In his three-out-of-five star review, Ralph Jones of NME lauded the series' ability to satirise timely events, "its topicality is admirable: there are several sketches here about events that occurred as little as 12 hours before the recording. This is impressive on the radio but when puppets are involved, it’s almost breathtaking."

The Economist was more mixed in their analysis, calling it "pretty tame" in light of the current political atmosphere and when compared to its 1984 predecessor, writing how "[i]n an era of cynicism and conspiracy theories, the radical act would be to make a show that celebrated public life."

Ed Power of The Telegraph was negative in his one-out-of-five star review pertaining to the two-part US election special, calling it "toothless" in its satire. Also writing for The Guardian, columnist Nesrine Malik similarly described the new series as a "toothless performance" and the jokes "excruciatingly obvious".

== German version ==
On 16 September 2021, a German version of Spitting Image called The Krauts' Edition began to air on the TV channel Sky. The German version has new puppets, including Sebastian Kurz, Jan Böhmermann, Annalena Baerbock, Karl Lauterbach, Markus Lanz, Heidi Klum, Thomas Müller, Olaf Scholz, Barbara Schöneberger, Armin Laschet, and Adolf Hitler. Puppets used in the British version such as Angela Merkel, Jurgen Klopp, and Coronavirus, also appear in this version.

== Stage show ==
A stage show titled Idiots Assemble: Spitting Image The Musical opened at the Birmingham Repertory Theatre on 1 February 2023 and ran until 12 March. It was written by Al Murray, Matt Forde, and Sean Foley, and directed by Foley. New puppets made for the show included Suella Braverman, Volodymyr Zelenskyy, Jacob Rees-Mogg, Paddington Bear, and Nigel Farage. On 23 March 2023, it was announced that the musical would be open at the Phoenix Theatre, at London's West End, from 24 May 2023.
