= Idiots Assemble: Spitting Image The Musical =

2023 stage show

- West End production artwork
- Written by: Al Murray; Matt Forde; Sean Foley
- Original language: English
- Genre: Satire

Premiere
- Date premiered: 1 February 2023
- Place premiered: Birmingham Repertory Theatre

Idiots Assemble: Spitting Image The Musical is a British satirical puppet stage show by Al Murray, Matt Forde and Sean Foley, based on the TV series Spitting Image, which in turn is based on the 1984 series of the same name created by Peter Fluck, Roger Law and Martin Lambie-Nairn.

== Production history ==
The show made its world premiere at the Birmingham Repertory Theatre running from 1 February to 11 March 2023, directed by Sean Foley. The show was originally announced as Spitting Image Live: Featuring The Liar King referring to Boris Johnson parodying The Lion King. Following the departure of Johnson as Prime Minister in September 2022, the production was renamed as Idiots Assemble: Spitting Image Saves The World.

The production transferred to London's West End at the Phoenix Theatre for a limited run from 24 May until 26 August 2023, renamed again as Idiots Assemble: Spitting Image The Musical.

== Cast ==
=== Voiceover artists ===
- Al Murray
- Debra Stephenson
- Jojo Lin
- Jason Forbes
- Jess Robinson
- Josh Berry
- Kathryn Drysdale
- Lorna Laidlaw
- Luke Kempner
- Matt Forde
- Ronan Summers
- Shri Patel
- Oliver Chris
- Jackie Lam

=== Puppeteers ===
- Katie Bradley
- Julian Brett
- Kaidan Dawkins
- Bertie Harris
- Jojo Lin
- Pena Iiyambo
- Chand Martinez
- Will Palmer
- Helen Parke
- Rayo Patel
- Tom Quinn
- Faye Weerasinghe
- Antony Antunes
- Rianna Ash
- Emily Essery
- Jackie Lam
- Bright Ong
- Richard Vorster
