= Spitting Image =

British satirical television puppet show

- Official logo
- Genre: Adult puppeteering; Political satire; Black comedy
- Created by: Peter Fluck; Roger Law; Martin Lambie-Nairn
- Voices of: Chris Barrie; Harry Enfield; Jon Glover; Louise Gold; Steve Nallon; Kate Robbins; John Sessions; and others
- Country of origin: United Kingdom
- Original language: English
- No. of series: 18
- No. of episodes: 134

Production
- Production locations: Central House (1984); Television House (1985–96)
- Running time: 30 to 60 minutes
- Production company: Spitting Image Productions for Central

Original release
- Network: ITV
- Release: 26 February 1984 – 18 February 1996

Related
- Spitting Image (2020 TV series); 2DTV

Spitting Image is a British satirical television puppet show, created by Peter Fluck, Roger Law and Martin Lambie-Nairn. First broadcast in 1984, the series was produced by "Spitting Image Productions" for Central Independent Television over 18 series which aired on the ITV network. The series was nominated and won numerous awards, including ten BAFTA Television Awards, and two Emmy Awards in 1985 and 1986 in the Popular Arts Category. The series features puppet caricatures of contemporary celebrities and public figures, including British Prime Ministers Margaret Thatcher and John Major and the British royal family. The series was the first to caricature Queen Elizabeth the Queen Mother (as an elderly gin-drinker with a Beryl Reid voice).

One of the most-watched shows of the 1980s, Spitting Image satirised politics, entertainment, sport and British popular culture of the era. At its peak, the show was watched by 15 million people. The popularity of the show saw collaborations with musicians, including Phil Collins and Sting. The series was cancelled in 1996 after viewing figures declined. ITV had plans for a new series in 2006, but these were scrapped after a dispute over the Ant & Dec puppets used to host Best Ever Spitting Image, which were created against Roger Law's wishes. In 2018, Law donated his entire archive – including scripts, puppet moulds, drawings and recordings – to the University of Cambridge.

In 2019, Law announced the show would be returning with a new series. The revived series debuted on 3 October 2020 on BritBox, and featured caricatures of Boris Johnson and Donald Trump, but was cancelled in 2022. In July 2025, the series was revived again, this time in an online format on YouTube.

== History ==
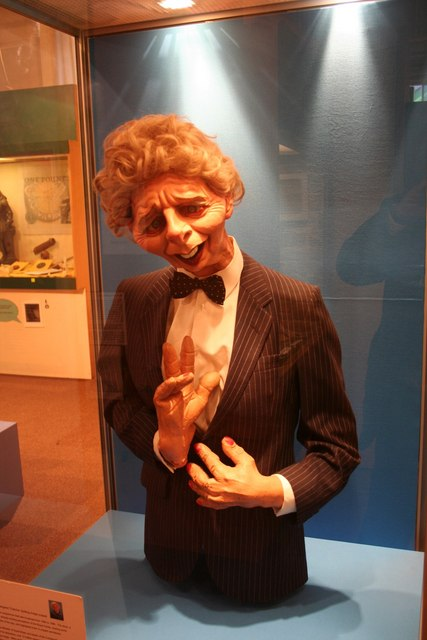
Puppet of Margaret Thatcher on display in Grantham Museum

Martin Lambie-Nairn proposed a satirical television show with caricature puppets created by Peter Fluck and Roger Law. Fluck and Law, who had both attended the Cambridge School of Art, had no previous television experience, but had, for several years, constructed plasticine caricatures to illustrate articles in The Sunday Times magazine. The idea for the series was rejected by many in the industry, who thought it would only be suitable for children, but the series was finally accepted for development and first broadcast in 1984.

English comedy writer and National Lampoon editor Tony Hendra was brought in as a writer; Fluck and Law had met him while they were working in the US. Hendra brought in John Lloyd, producer of Not The Nine O'Clock News. They were joined by Jon Blair, a documentary producer. They then hired Muppet puppeteer Louise Gold. Development was funded by the entrepreneur Clive Sinclair.

The puppets, based on public figures, were designed by Fluck and Law, assisted by caricaturists including David Stoten, Pablo Bach, Steve Bendelack and Tim Watts. The episodes included musical parodies by Philip Pope (former member of Who Dares Wins and The Hee Bee Gee Bees) and later Steve Brown.

In 1984, the first episode of Spitting Image was aired with a laugh track, apparently at the insistence of Central Television. This episode was shown to a preview audience before transmission. In the early years of the show, Spitting Image was filmed and based in the enterprise zone at London Docklands at the Limehouse Studios, where scriptwriters convened and puppets were manufactured. Impressionist Steve Nallon recalls that "they were able to get away with no health and safety, so all of the building of the puppets with all the toxic waste from the foam was just in a warehouse. There were no extractor fans; it was quite Dickensian." In later series, Spitting Image was recorded at Central's studios in Nottingham with last minute additions being recorded at the Limehouse Studios at Canary Wharf, London.

== Reception ==
Before the first episode was broadcast, the parodies of the Royal Family were cut as a courtesy to the Duke of Edinburgh, who opened the East Midlands Television Centre a few days later. The scenes were all reinstated in later episodes. Stephen Fry has written that Diana, Princess of Wales told him around 1991 that "They hate it of course. I absolutely adore it." Avalon Television executive producer Jon Thoday stated that Ronald Reagan directly contacted NBC asking for the show to be cancelled.

The first episode had an audience of 7.9 million, but numbers rapidly dropped, which meant economies had to be introduced since the series cost £2.6 million to make, nearly double the price of other prime time series.

The series had been originally scheduled to have 13 episodes, but was cut to 12 after the series was nearly cancelled. Rob Grant and Doug Naylor were then brought in as head writers to save the show; by 1986, under their supervision, Spitting Image had become popular, producing a number one song on the UK singles chart ("The Chicken Song"). However, Grant and Naylor subsequently left to create Red Dwarf for BBC2. Spitting Image had a short-running dispute with the Independent Broadcasting Authority (IBA) in 1985, over the use of subliminal images.

=== Evolution ===
When Margaret Thatcher resigned as both Prime Minister and Leader of the Conservative Party in November 1990, her successor was Chancellor of the Exchequer John Major. This marked a shift in the tone of the show, with the writers moving from the Punch and Judy style to more subtle and atmospheric sketches, notably a series in which an awkward Major and wife Norma ate peas for dinner. The producers dressed Major, skin and all, in shades of grey, and invented an affair between him and Virginia Bottomley.

The show added animated sketches from 1989 and again from 1994 (with short, animated segments before 1989). For the 1992 Election Special, a studio audience was used; this format was revisited for two episodes in late 1993. A spoof Question Time took questions from the audience. The 1992 show was fronted by a puppet Robin Day, a puppet Jeremy Paxman filling the role in the episodes broadcast on 14 November 1993 and 12 December 1993.

== Characters ==
=== Politicians ===
Thatcher: Oh dear. We're never going to win the next election now! We need some way of winning votes!

Howe: I suggest a quick war in early '87. That should get some votes.

Thatcher: Geoffrey, you're a complete imbecile. We can't have a quick war just to win votes! Though, now that you mention it, look into it, will you?

Many British politicians in parliament during Margaret Thatcher's tenure were parodied. By far the most prominent was Thatcher herself, portrayed as an abusive, tyrannical, cigar-chomping cross-dresser (she wore suits, shaved, used the urinals, and was addressed by her Cabinet as "Sir").

In the first series, Thatcher sought advice from her enraptured neighbour Herr Jeremy Von Wilcox (who is actually an elderly Adolf Hitler, living at 9 Downing Street) about the unions and the unemployed. In the third episode, Mr. Wilcox/Hitler compares the trade unions with the Soviet Union and advises not to attack in winter. In that same episode, regarding unemployment, he says that people out of work should be put in the army, and tells Thatcher that he thinks the SS (meaning SAS) are a "great bunch of guys".

Alongside Thatcher were her Cabinet, which included:

- Willie Whitelaw, with fluffy eyebrows and wearing a tartan dressing gown to cabinet meetings.
- Nigel Lawson, panicking about a financial crisis he had apparently caused (a real-life recession caused Lawson to step down in 1989). He is by far the worst of all the cabinet being unable to count to 17; he also writes new budget and tax laws in his favour. However, upon discovering Thatcher promptly has him rewrite them in her favour.
- Geoffrey Howe, bland and talks to sheep.
- Douglas Hurd, famous for his Dalek-style voice and his hair shaped like a "Mr Whippy" ice cream. Hurd seems also the most competent and humane one in the cabinet, opposing the usage of torture and stopping the dumping of nuclear waste in Scotland.
- Norman Tebbit, appearing as a leather-clad skinhead loyal to Thatcher, referring to her as "Leader" and often beating up other politicians.
- Michael Heseltine, growing more manic with every series (and wearing a flak jacket as Defence Secretary).
- Leon Brittan, constantly fawning towards Thatcher and often seen eating.
- Norman Fowler, portrayed during his time as Health Secretary as a hospital-murdering Jack the Ripper-style lunatic.
- Cecil Parkinson, having a playboy attitude
- Edwina Currie, portrayed as a vampire or Cruella de Vil.
- Paul Channon, childish.
- Kenneth Baker, transforming into a slug over the series.
- Nicholas Ridley, smoking and developing the countryside for houses.
- Kenneth Clarke, obese and drunk despite being Minister for Health.
- Peter Walker, as a spineless wimp.
- David Waddington, fast talking and creepy.
- Francis Pym and Jim Prior, Wets who swam in swimming pools.
- Colin Moynihan, minuscule and childlike, called "miniature for sport".
- Tom King, portrayed while Employment Secretary as The Invisible Man.

Thatcher's Cabinet were often depicted as bickering schoolchildren, with Thatcher acting as teacher. In one skit she treats her Cabinet to a meal at a restaurant. The waitress asks: "Would you like to order, sir?" Thatcher responds: "Yes. I will have the steak" Waitress: "And what about the Vegetables?" Thatcher: "Oh, they'll [The Cabinet] have the same as me".

Thatcher's successor John Major was portrayed as a dull, boring grey character who enjoyed a meal of peas with his wife Norma and was constantly mocked by Humphrey, the Downing Street cat. Before Thatcher's resignation, Major had been portrayed as wearing a leopard print suit and swinging in on a trapeze, referencing his background as the son of a circus acrobat (which he would frequently remind everyone about). Upon his appointment to Prime Minister, Major was initially portrayed as a robot with a spinning antenna on his head (it was explained in a sketch that Thatcher used it to control Major, standing behind Thatcher in the crowd of sycophantic cabinet members, eager to repeat whatever the Thatcher puppet screeched).

The Opposition (Labour Party) politicians included:

- Neil Kinnock, the 'Welsh Windbag', talking for hours about anything other than policies.
- Roy Hattersley, spitting with every word because of his lisp (on 'Best Ever Spitting Image', Hattersley praised his puppet for 'putting the spit into Spitting Image').
- Michael Foot, aged and senile, ending sentences with "Yes! Argh!".
- Tony Benn, a rampant socialist with eyes that never looked in the same direction.
- Ken Livingstone, whose living room was filled with salamanders and snakes.
- Denis Healey, with giant eyebrows, who helped to make Kinnock look foolish (the real Healey appeared in the programme in 1984 in a skit about that year's European elections in the UK).
- Gerald Kaufman, portrayed as a Hannibal Lecter-style maniac.

Arthur Scargill, who was a member of the Labour Party until 1997, appeared as head of the National Union of Mineworkers, and was portrayed as a big-nosed egotist who was ignorant about mining.

In 1994, a puppet of Tony Blair made his appearance. He was originally a public school boy, wearing grey shorts, blazer and cap. His catchphrase was "I'M THE LEADER" in reference to his attempt to lead the Labour Party. When Blair did become Labour leader, the puppet changed and he was portrayed with his grin replaced with an even bigger smile if he said something of importance. The deputy leader, John Prescott, was portrayed as a fat bumbling assistant, along with a squeaky voiced Robin Cook, and an enormous bespectacled Jack Straw.

The SDP–Liberal Alliance was portrayed by the election-losing, populist, arrogant and undecided David Owen, with whining, bedwetting David Steel in his pocket. They were soon replaced by Paddy Ashdown, whose "equidistance" from the larger parties was satirised by his frequent appearance at the side of the screen during unrelated sketches, saying: "I am neither in this sketch nor not in it, but somewhere in-between". This running gag was used when Ashdown's extramarital affair was revealed, and his puppet commented that "I didn't touch her on the left leg, or the right leg, but somewhere in-between." Former Liberal MP Cyril Smith also made a few appearances as a morbidly obese giant.

In the first series, Former Prime Ministers Harold Wilson, James Callaghan, Harold Macmillan and Alec Douglas-Home were depicted as living in a highly restrictive retirement home named Exchequers, where they were frequently abused by Queen Victoria. Wilson constantly attempted escape, whilst Callaghan took delight in tormenting him. Edward Heath was also said to have resided there, but he was not seen on screen; later, he would appear as a naked piano player.

=== Royal Family ===
The main characters were:

- Elizabeth II: wore a CND badge, always seemed slightly mad and picked clothes from rubbish bins.
- Prince Philip, Duke of Edinburgh was a blunderbuss-toting Greek-obsessed buffoon in naval uniform.
- Charles, Prince of Wales was a pseudo-hippie, then a taxi driver in later episodes.
- Diana, Princess of Wales was a publicity-hungry Sloane Ranger.
- Queen Elizabeth the Queen Mother, who was generally seen with a bottle of Gordon's Gin, a copy of the Racing Post, and a Beryl Reid voice; this was a running joke from a sketch in which the Royal Family's desire to conceal her Birmingham accent was the reason she was seldom heard speaking on television. In the series she is seen with jockey Lester Piggott with whom she has an affair.

Other members who were parodied include nymphomaniac Prince Andrew, envious and heavily freckled Sarah, Duchess of York, grumpy Princess Anne, poorly informed Prince Edward, Panzer-driving Princess Michael of Kent, and always-tipsy Princess Margaret.

=== International politicians ===
Spitting Image lampooned US President Ronald Reagan as a bumbling, nuke-obsessed fool in comparison with his advisors Edwin Meese and Caspar Weinberger. Next to his bed were red buttons labelled 'Nuke' and 'Nurse'. His wife Nancy was the butt of cosmetic surgery jokes.

Mikhail Gorbachev's forehead birthmark was shaped like a hammer and sickle. All other Russians looked like Leonid Brezhnev, often said "da" ("yes") and talked about potatoes. In Russia it was snowing even indoors and the Soviet television had extremely low-tech visual effects.

Yitzhak Shamir often appeared wearing a hard hat with the Star of David on it, holding a brick and referring to building a "legitimate Israeli settlement" (referring to the practice of building houses on the occupied West Bank for Israeli people).

François Mitterrand was wearing a beret and a garlic wreath, his successor Jacques Chirac was depicted as being obsessed and callous with nuclear weapons. P. W. Botha was shown as a racist cleverly disguising his views (once he had a badge "anti-anti-apartheid"). Some appearances were also made by Idi Amin, Robert Mugabe, Ferdinand and Imelda Marcos, Ruhollah Khomeini, Saddam Hussein and Muammar Gaddafi. Khomeini appear to parody Iranian law and policy.

Khomeini and Botha along with the more recurring Reagan, Thatcher, Pope John Paul II, and Gorbachev appear in the Spitting Image video game.

Other international caricatures included Richard Nixon and Henry Kissinger; George H. W. Bush and Dan Quayle; Bill Clinton and Hillary Clinton, Konstantin Chernenko, Raisa Gorbachova and Boris Yeltsin.

=== Sport ===
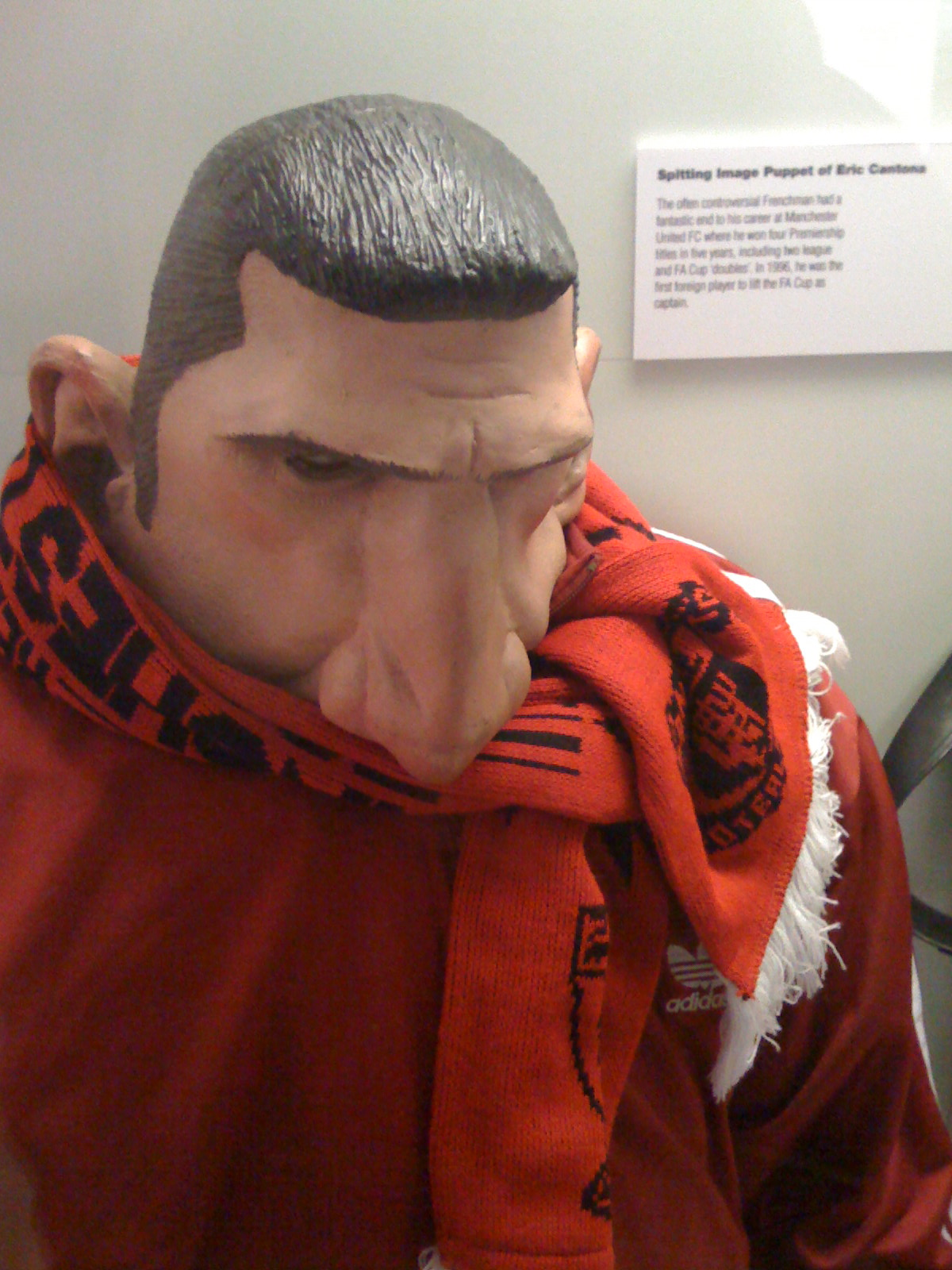
Puppet of Manchester United striker Eric Cantona

England manager Bobby Robson was a senile worrier nicknamed 'Rubbisho'. Emlyn Hughes was portrayed with a high pitched and annoying voice. England midfielder Paul Gascoigne appeared, frequently crying – a parody of the 1990 World Cup semi-final against West Germany, in which he famously cried after being booked, which would have ruled him out of the final had England won the game.

Ian Botham was a violent drug addict, while Mike Gatting spoke with a high voice. Lester Piggott had to be subtitled. Boxing characters included Frank Bruno with his trademark laugh and catchphrase "where's 'Arry?", and Chris Eubank, with his lisp. Snooker player Steve Davis was boring, upset because he had no nickname, but thought himself interesting.

=== Celebrities ===
News reporters were also depicted: Alastair Burnet was sycophantic towards the Royal Family and with a nose that inflated; Sandy Gall was effeminate, always worrying what coat he would wear; John Cole was incomprehensible and had to be dragged off-screen when he talked for too long; Nicholas Witchell was always turning up during a strike to work rather than report; Kate Adie was a thrill-seeker, and BBC Head of Bravery. Presenters were also seen: Jeremy Paxman appeared as uninterested and self-loving, and Trevor McDonald frequently lamented his lot after being paired with Ronnie Corbett as newscasters, with the latter always getting the punchlines. William Rees-Mogg was portrayed as a censorship-crazy person with eyes that would frequently pop out of the socket.

David Coleman had a very loud ear prompter and sometimes did not know what he was commentating on; Frank Bough was portrayed as being a drug user; Bruce Forsyth spoke every sentence as though it was a catchphrase. Celebrity chef Keith Floyd was always getting drunk on wine, while film critic Barry Norman was not a fan of his puppet, because it had an inexplicable wart on its forehead, which he did not have. Paul Daniels did not mind jokes about his toupée, but took offence to a sketch depicting him nuzzling his assistant Debbie McGee's breasts.

Comedians were satirised: Billy Connolly was portrayed as a jester; Jimmy Tarbuck was said to use old jokes and always take part in the Royal Variety Performance; Bernard Manning was an obese racist; and Ben Elton was always shown with a microphone.

Writer and MP Jeffrey Archer appeared as an annoying, self-commenting writer whose books were not read by anyone. Kenneth Williams was depicted with a large nose and big teeth, and Harry Secombe was depicted as overly religious. Alan Bennett was shown at home as watching Spitting Image on TV. Esther Rantzen always had a permanent grin and was frequently carrying an onion (reflecting a concurrent running joke in Private Eye suggesting insincere theatrical tears), whilst Cilla Black had large teeth and a thick Scouse accent.

=== Musicians ===
A Mick Jagger character seemed perpetually high, and Keith Richards so old and haggard that he thought he was dead. Ringo Starr was a drunkard, and Paul McCartney was always releasing albums and films that flopped. Madonna changed her hair and clothes with every episode, and Michael Jackson's skin turned lighter. Kylie Minogue was depicted as a vain robot; Luciano Pavarotti was hugely overweight and ate everything he saw; Matt and Luke Goss of the band Bros were depicted as children wanting to grow up.

=== Actors ===
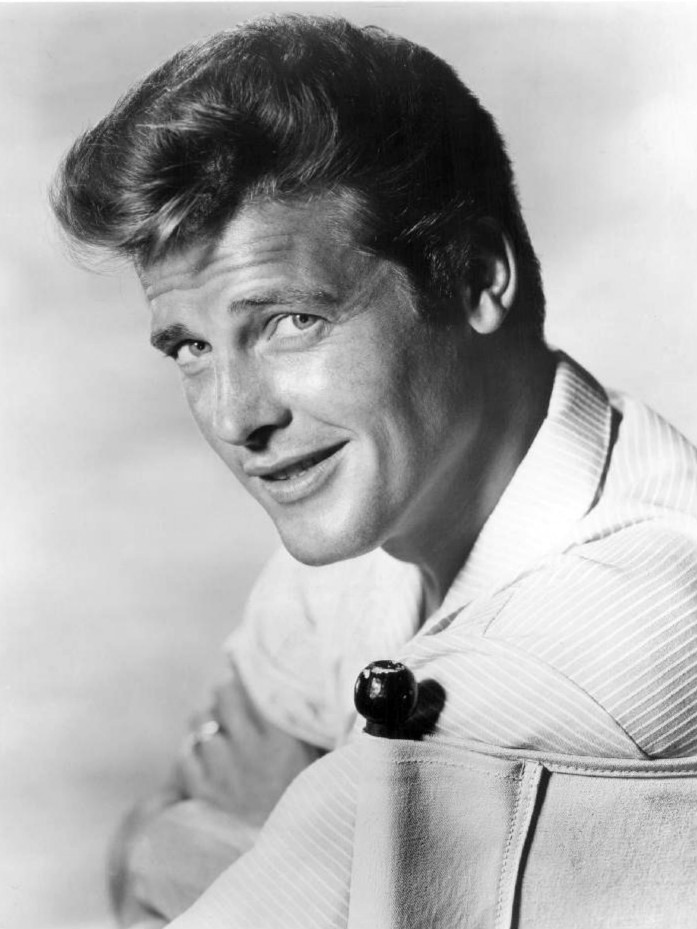
Roger Moore enjoyed his parody on the show.

Actor Dustin Hoffman spoke nasally and was parodied for his method acting; John Gielgud and Laurence Olivier lamented their friends, and even their own death. James Bond actor Roger Moore was depicted "with a wooden delivery" – only his eyebrows moved; Moore quipped, "My acting range has always been something between the two extremes of 'raises left eyebrow' and 'raises right eyebrow'." Arnold Schwarzenegger was muscle-bound but insecure about the size of his genitals; Donald Sinden was parodied as also trying to become the greatest Shakespearian actor and get a knighthood. Clint Eastwood was frequently portrayed as an uncompromising tough guy, and Sylvester Stallone nearly always appeared dressed up as John Rambo.

=== Religious figures ===
Archbishop Robert Runcie, Mary Whitehouse and Cliff Richard were portrayed as Christian censors. Ian Paisley was always shouting and dressed in black. Bishop David Jenkins was depicted as not believing in anything. Pope John Paul II was a banjo-playing womaniser who spoke with a hip urban African-American accent.

=== Others ===
Media moguls Robert Maxwell and Rupert Murdoch were also on the show, the latter depicted as an extremely flatulent individual encouraging obscenity in his mass media.

Lord Lucan appeared in various background roles often as a bartender.

== Songs ==
Spitting Image album cover for "Da Do Run Ron", satirical parody of Ronald Reagan

The first single from Spitting Image, released in 1984, was a rework of the Crystals' "Da Doo Ron Ron". The Spitting Image version, "Da Do Run Ron", was a spoof election campaign song for Ronald Reagan, featuring Nancy Reagan listing reasons to elect her husband. The cover of the single featured Reagan as a biker with Nancy riding pillion.

The B-side of this single was titled "Just A Prince Who Can't Say No" and poked fun at the sexual indiscretions of then-Prince Andrew. The TV version of this song (featured in the second episode) was heavily censored by Central Television on broadcast but presented uncut on vinyl. In the television series he was shown surrounded by various famous women including Joan Collins, Mary Whitehouse and Linda McCartney.

In 1986, the Spitting Image puppets released "The Chicken Song", a parody of "Agadoo" by Black Lace – one of several parodies to have featured in the programme, mimicking novelty records and holiday songs with a repetitive tunes and nonsensical lyrics. Ironically, The Chicken Song hit number 1 in the UK Singles Chart for 3 weeks from 17 May 1986 – 3 June 1986. VH1 US named it as one of the worst number 1 nominations.

The other songs released by Spitting Image were "I've Never Met a Nice South African" (which was on the B-Side of "The Chicken Song" and was a savage indictment of the apartheid-ridden country), "We're Scared Of Bob" (a parody of "We Are The World") and "Hello You Must Be Going" (which mocked Phil Collins's divorce ballads and was on the 12" release of The Chicken Song), "Santa Claus Is on the Dole" (backed with "The Atheist Tabernacle Choir"), "The Christmas Singles" and "Cry Gazza Cry" (based on footballer Paul Gascoigne's tears in the 1990 World Cup).

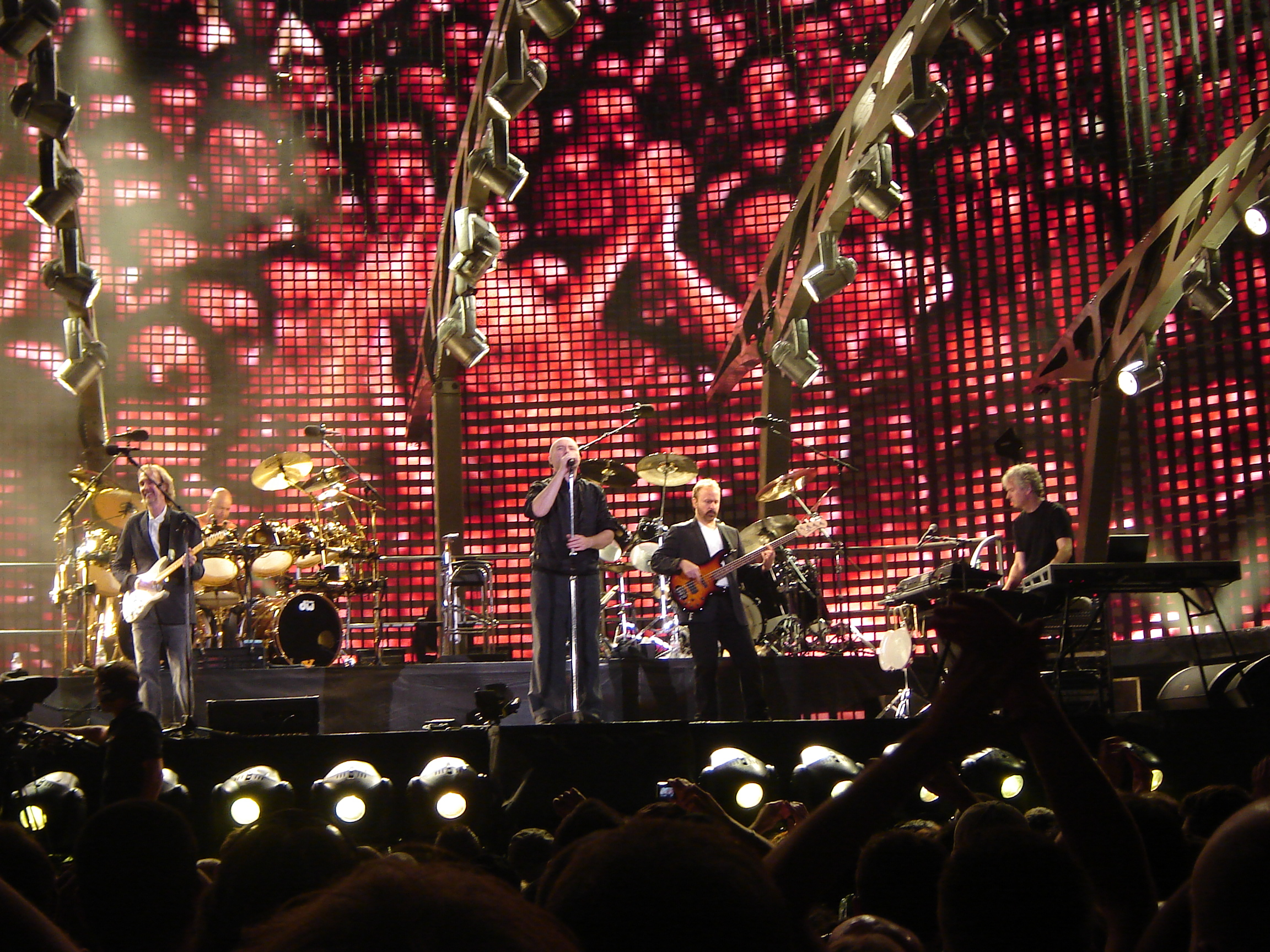
Phil Collins on stage with Genesis. After he saw a caricatured version of himself on Spitting Image, he commissioned the show's creators, Peter Fluck and Roger Law, to create puppets of the band which appear in their music video "Land of Confusion".

"The Chicken Song" was by far the most successful of all of their music and not-so-subtle references were made to it in subsequent sketches in the show itself. In 1986, a compilation LP "Spit In Your Ear" was produced, featuring some of their sketches over time along with a few of their songs, followed in 1990 by "20 Great Golden Gobs", a songs-only collection from the 1986–1990 series.

In 1986, the Spitting Image team experienced some real musical success when they created the video for "Land of Confusion" by Genesis, a song which implied that Thatcher and Reagan were about to bring the world to a nuclear war. Phil Collins saw a disfigured version of himself on the show and contacted the show's producers with the idea to produce the video. Three new puppets were created depicting all members of Genesis (including a less exaggerated version of Collins), which also appear on the sleeve of the 45 (and later CD) single. The video was depicted as a nightmare Reagan was having, which left him completely immersed in sweat from worrying. It won a Grammy Award for Best Concept Music Video in 1987.

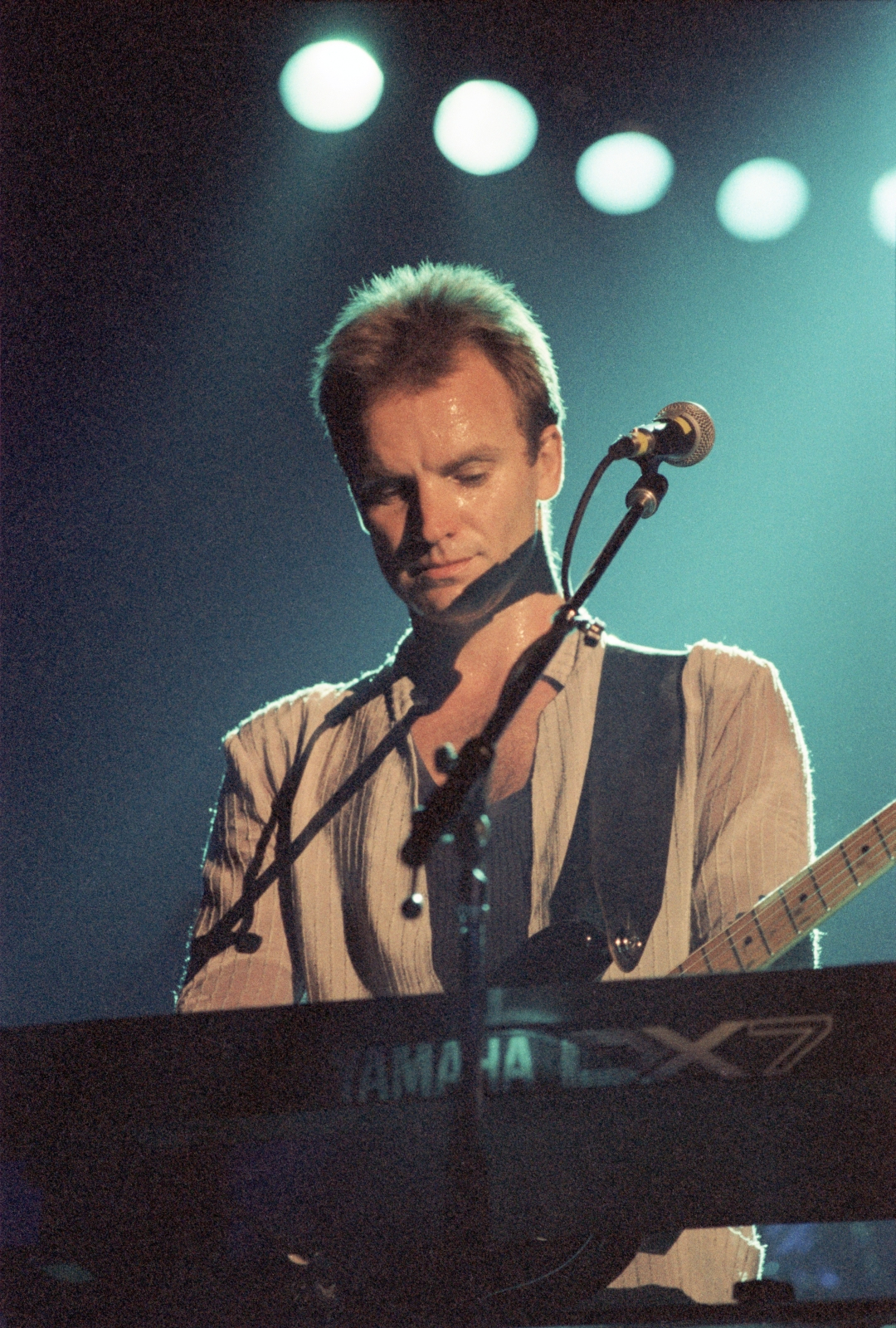
Sting (pictured in May 1986) recorded "Every Bomb You Make" for the show.

The end of the 1987 election featured a young boy, dressed as a city banker, singing "Tomorrow Belongs to Me", a parody of the film Cabaret, when a member of the Hitler Youth starts singing the same song. In a series 5 episode, Labour leader Neil Kinnock is portrayed singing a self-parody to the tune "My eyes are fully open" from Gilbert and Sullivan's Ruddigore, supported by members of his shadow cabinet.

The 12th and last episode of the first series ends with a parody version of "Every Breath You Take" by The Police, titled "Every Bomb You Make". Sting recorded new lyrics for the song, which accompanied a video showing the Spitting Image puppets of world leaders and political figures of the day, usually with the figure matching the altered lyrics

Every bomb you make
Every job you take
Every heart you break
Every Irish wake
I'll be watching you
Every wall you build
Every one you've killed
Every grave you've filled
All the blood you've spilled
I'll be watching you

The video ended with the grim reaper appearing in front of a sunset. This version was due to be resurrected by Sting at the Live 8 concert, and the parody lyrics were cleared with their writers Quentin Reynolds and James Glen, but plans were abandoned at the last minute.

The closing music for series 8 episode 3 featured an ensemble of characters performing "We All Hate Jeremy Beadle", in reference to the light entertainment host of that name. In series 9 episode 4, the show ended with "Why Can't Life Be Like Hello?", sung by June Brown (who was commonly known as the EastEnders character Dot Cotton). The song pastiches Hello magazine, in satire of post-Big Bang UK consumerist culture.

Other musical parodies featured Mick Jagger, Michael Jackson, David Bowie, Kylie Minogue, The Monkees, Pulp, Brett Anderson of Suede, Pet Shop Boys, R.E.M., Björk, East 17, Elvis Presley, Oasis, ZZ Top, Prince and Barbra Streisand.

== Staff ==
Spitting Image launched the careers of and featured many then-unknown British comedians and actors, including Hugh Dennis, Steve Coogan and Harry Enfield.

=== Voices ===
The voices were provided by British impressionists including:

- Chris Barrie (1984–1991)
- Roger Blake (1990–1996)
- Brian Bowles (1993)
- Rory Bremner (1987)
- Phil Cool (1984–1985)
- Phil Cornwell (1986)
- Steve Coogan (1988–1993)
- Jon Culshaw (1994–1996)
- Hugh Dennis (1989–1992)
- Ade Edmondson (1984)
- Harry Enfield (1985–1989, 1996)
- Chris Emmett (1984, 1990)
- Michael Fenton Stevens (singing voices only, mainly backing vocals)
- Fogwell Flax (1984)
- Jon Glover (1984–1989, 1994)
- Louise Gold (1984–1985)
- Alistair McGowan (1991–1996)
- Jessica Martin (1985–1988)
- Steve Nallon (1984–1996) (voice of Margaret Thatcher)
- Philip Pope (1984–1991, singing voices only)
- Jan Ravens (1984–1992)
- Enn Reitel (1985–1990, 1994, 1996)
- Kate Robbins (1986–1996)
- Bob Saker (1987)
- Peter Serafinowicz (1996)
- John Sessions (1986)
- Steve Steen (1993)
- Debra Stephenson (1989)
- John Thomson (1990, 1992–1994)

=== Puppeteers ===
- Anthony Asbury
- Don Austen
- Chris Barrie
- Richard Coombs
- John Eccleston
- Louise Gold
- Steve Nallon
- Angie Passmore
- Nigel Plaskitt
- Martin P. Robinson
- Richard Robinson
- Tim Rose
- John Thirtle
- Ian Thom
- William Todd-Jones
- Mak Wilson
- Francis Wright

=== Writers ===
- Barry Atkins
- Geoff Atkinson (1984–1993)
- David Austin
- Debbie Barham
- Alistair Beaton
- Colin Bostock-Smith
- Jo Brand (one episode, 1988)
- Mark Burton (1985–1993)
- Kevin Cecil (1993–1996)
- Paul John Clark
- Richard Curtis (1984–1985)
- Terence Dackombe (1984–1989)
- Paul B. Davies
- (John) Jack Docherty and Moray Hunter
- Chris Edge
- Ben Elton (1984–1985)
- Stevie Fowler
- Dan Gaster
- Patrick Gallagher
- Simon Goodman
- Rob Grant (1984–1986)
- Sean Hardie
- Ray Harris (1985–1993)
- Brian Highley (1984-1986)
- Ian Hislop (1984–1989)
- Will Ing
- Guy Jenkin
- Donnie Kerr
- David Kind
- Wayne Kline
- Chris Langham (1984)
- Stewart Lee
- Paul Lewis
- Victor Lewis-Smith and Paul Sparks (one episode, 1988)
- Johnny Mack
- Chris Morris (satirist)
- Doug Naylor (1984–1986)
- Henry Naylor (1984–1986)
- Nick Newman (1984–1989)
- John O'Farrell (1984–1993)
- Andy Parsons (1993–1996)
- Paul Powell
- Georgia Pritchett (1986–1992)
- Steve Punt (1989–1993)
- Quentin Reynolds
- Neil Raphael (1984–1987)
- Keith Rees
- Andy Riley (1993–1996)
- Laurie Rowley
- Tony Sarchet
- Stuart Silver
- Paul Simpkin
- Pete Sinclair
- Paul Smith (1984–1985)
- Andrea Solomons
- David Slade & Frank Walsh (Thatcher Vegetables Sketch)

=== Producers ===
- Jon Blair, John Lloyd, Tony Hendra (first six episodes, 1984)
- Jon Blair, John Lloyd (1984)
- John Lloyd (1984–1986)
- Geoffrey Perkins (1986–1988)
- David Tyler (1989)
- Bill Dare (1990–1993)
- Giles Pilbrow (1994–1996)

=== Directors ===
- Stephen Bendelack
- Richard Bradley
- Philip Casson
- Bob Cousins
- Andy De Emmony
- Gordon Elsbury
- Sean Hardie
- Peter Harris
- John Henderson
- Liddy Oldroyd
- Tom Poole
- Geoffrey Sax
- John Stroud
- Graham C. Williams

== Decline ==
Puppets of a Court Flunkey and Osama bin Laden. The face of the Flunkey is a caricature of 18th-century cartoonist James Gillray, the father of British political cartooning.

The writers, Mark Burton, John O'Farrell, Pete Sinclair, Stuart Silver, and Ray Harris quit the show in 1993 and in 1995, and with viewing figures in decline, production was cancelled. The final series was initially planned for broadcast in autumn 1995 but was subsequently broadcast in January and February 1996, with the final episode featuring "The Last Prophecies of Spitting Image" in which Labour moved into Number 10. A few years later, most of the puppets were sold at an auction hosted by Sotheby's, including a puppet of Osama bin Laden never used in the series.

During 2004, the idea of the series coming back started to appear after John Lloyd held talks with ITV executives about the show's return. John Lloyd also held talks with a number of people who voiced the Spitting Image puppets, including John Sessions, Harry Enfield and Rory Bremner, with all responding positively.

Lloyd said: "There's enormous enthusiasm from ITV to do it. We're just trying to work out how it would be affordable. The budget is about to go off to ITV. Everybody seems to have residual affection for Spitting Image. It could be scrappy and uneven, but it's rather like a newspaper. You don't expect it to be brilliant every time, but there's something delicious in every edition."

By early 2006, ITV were producing a documentary celebrating the series and if the audience figures were good a full series might have been produced. On 25 June 2006, ITV transmitted Best Ever Spitting Image as a one-off special of Spitting Image which took a nostalgic look back at the programme's highlights. This special actually prevented ITV directly resurrecting the famous satire as they had planned, because it featured new puppets of Ant & Dec – a move which was against the wishes of Roger Law, who owns the rights to the Spitting Image brand.

Spitting Image, as ITV's primary satirical programme, was succeeded by 2DTV, a cartoon format that had five series between 2001 and 2004. In 2008 ITV created a CGI version to caricature and lampoon the famous, called Headcases, but it only aired for one series. Satirical puppets finally returned to ITV in 2015, in Newzoids.

== Archive donated to Cambridge University ==
In 2018, Spitting Image co-creator Roger Law donated his entire archive – which includes original scripts, puppet moulds, drawings and recordings – to Cambridge University. The collection is located in the university library, with its librarian Dr Jessica Gardner describing the collection as a "national treasure". She added, "Spitting Image was anarchic, it was creative, it entered the public imagination like nothing else from that era. It is an extraordinary political and historical record. Great satire holds up a mirror, it questions and challenges."

== Broadcast dates ==
All episodes and specials were broadcast on Sunday, usually at 10 pm. The programme was also picked up overseas. It aired on Canada's CBC Television on Sunday nights in the late 1980s. The American network NBC aired several prime-time specials in the same period. Austrian public broadcaster ORF broadcast Spitting Image in English with German subtitles late on Friday nights in approximately four-week intervals in the late 1980s and early 1990s, introducing it to the German-speaking world (where foreign programming is usually dubbed into German). Spitting Image was also briefly shown in France on the private TV channel M6 in English with French subtitles. The show was also aired in New Zealand on TVNZ in the 1980s.

=== Series ===
Series	Year	Dates	No. episodes	Times
Series 1	1984	26 February – 17 June	12 episodes	Mostly 10 pm
Series 2	1985	6 January – 24 March	11 episodes	Mostly 10 pm
Series 3	1986	6 January – 2 November	17 episodes	Mostly 10 pm
Series 4	1987	1 November – 6 December	6 episodes	Mostly 10 pm
Series 5	1988	6 November – 11 December	6 episodes	Mostly 10 pm
Series 6	1989	11 June – 9 July	5 episodes	Mostly 9.30 pm
Series 7	1989	12 November – 17 December	6 episodes	Mostly 10.05 pm
Series 8	1990	13 May – 24 June	6 episodes	Mostly 10.05 pm
Series 9	1990	11 November – 16 December	6 episodes	Mostly 10.05 pm
Series 10	1991	14 April – 19 May	6 episodes	Mostly 10.05 pm
Series 11	1991	10 November – 15 December	6 episodes	Mostly 10.05 pm
Series 12	1992	12 April – 17 May	6 episodes	Mostly 10.05 pm
Series 13	1992	4 October – 8 November	6 episodes	10.05 pm
Series 14	1993	16 May – 20 June	6 episodes	10.45 pm
Series 15	1993	7 November – 12 December	6 episodes	10pm
Series 16	1994	1 May – 12 June	7 episodes	10pm
Series 17	1994	6 November – 18 December	7 episodes	10pm
Series 18	1996	14 January – 18 February	6 episodes	Mostly 11.15 pm

=== Specials ===
Title	Year	Date	Times	Duration
Down and Out in the White House	1986	14 September	9.45 pm	45 minutes
The Spitting Image 1987 Movie Awards	1987	Saturday 4 April	10.45 pm	30 minutes
Election Special	1987	Thursday 11 June	10pm	45 minutes
A Non-Denominational Spitting Image Holiday Special	1987	27 December	10pm	30 minutes
The Ronnie and Nancy Show	1988	17 April	9.30 pm	30 minutes
Bumbledown – The Life and Times of Ronald Reagan	1988	Saturday 29 October	10.15 pm	45 minutes
The Sound of Maggie	1989	Saturday 6 May	10.10 pm	45 minutes
Election Special	1992	Wednesday 8 April	10.40 pm	30 minutes
Spitting Back	1993	16 July	10.45 pm	30 minutes(?)
The Spitting Image Pantomime	1993	26 December	10pm	30 minutes
Ye Olde Spitting Image	1995	1 January	10.45 pm	30 minutes
Best Ever Spitting Image	2006	25 June	10pm	47 minutes
Spitting Image at 30	2014	25 February	9 pm	45 minutes

== Repeats ==
From November 1996 Spitting Image Series 1–11 were on UK Gold until September 1998. Edited episodes from Series 1–3 and 7 were on Granada Plus from 2001 to 2003.

In February 2008, Comedy Central Extra started showing regular repeats of Spitting Image from 9 pm on Tuesday evenings, with a whole weekend's worth of evenings devoted to the first two series. It reappeared in a late night slot in November 2010, through to 18 December 2010 and has not been aired since then. From 2001 to 2004 the ITV series 2DTV had a similar style, but using computer animation instead of puppets; repeats of the show also aired on ITV2 at the same time.

=== American version ===
In an attempt to crack the American market, there were some attempts to produce an American version of the show. A 45-minute 'made for market' show by the original Spitting Image team, titled Spitting Image: Down and Out in the White House was produced in 1986 by Central for the NBC network. NBC did not give this high priority. During the late summer, when viewership was traditionally low and the networks aired reruns of the previous season, NBC broke the special into two half-hour episodes and slotted them into its schedule on 30 August and 6 September of that year, following reruns of The Golden Girls.

Introduced by David Frost, it departed from the sketch-based format in favour of an overall storyline involving the upcoming (at that time) Presidential election. The plot involved a conspiracy to replace Ronald Reagan with a double (actually actor Dustin Hoffman in disguise). This plan was hatched by the Famous Corporation, a cabal of the ultra-rich headed by Johnny Carson's foil Ed McMahon (in the show, Carson was his ineffectual left-hand man) who met in a secret cavern hollowed out behind the façade of Mount Rushmore. Eventually, their plot foiled, the famous corporation activated their escape pod – Abraham Lincoln's nose – and left Earth for another planet, but (in a homage to the beginning of the Star Wars movies) were destroyed during a collision with 'a nonsensical prologue in gigantic lettering'.

The show did not achieve high ratings. It did, however, receive great praise from critics and it was followed by several more television specials: The Ronnie & Nancy Show (also satirising the Reagans), The 1987 Movie Awards (sending up the Academy Awards), Bumbledown: The Life and Times of Ronald Reagan (a quasi-documentary about the President), and The Sound of Maggie (satirising Thatcher and parodying several musicals such as Oliver!, West Side Story and many others).

== Revival ==
In September 2019, the show was confirmed to be returning 23 years after it originally ended, with the unveiling of the puppets of Greta Thunberg, Donald Trump, Vladimir Putin, Mark Zuckerberg, Prince Harry and Meghan Markle. Roger Law stated that the pilot for the new series had been filmed and that talks were in progress with US networks to take the show to a larger, global audience, and that the revival is set to have a global appeal through a "uniquely British eye". Among the writers for the revival will be Jeff Westbrook of Futurama (who also serves as executive producer), Al Murray, The Windsors creators Bert Tyler-Moore and George Jeffrie, Bill Odenkirk, David X. Cohen, Jason Hazeley, Keisha Zollar, Patric Verrone, Phil Wang, and Sophie Duker.

On 4 March 2020, the show was announced to be returning on the streaming service BritBox, as its first official commission. The show premiered on the service on 3 October 2020, featuring the voices of Billy West, Debra Stephenson, Debra Wilson, Guz Khan, Indira Varma, Jess Robinson, John DiMaggio, Lewis MacLeod, Lobo Chan, Matt Forde, and Phil LaMarr. It was cancelled on 24 October 2022.

== Home releases ==
The programme was first released on video in 1986 in a series of three collections, each a compilation of material from the first two series: Spit – With Polish!, A Floppy Mass Of Blubber & Rubber Thingies. All carried a 15 certificate and were reissued in 1988, also as a box set. 1989 saw the release by Central Video of two complete specials, Bumbledown: The Life & Times Of Ronald Reagan and The Sound Of Maggie and was also released in the U.S. by BFS Video. Next was a video containing a collection of the music videos from the programme, titled "The Klassik Music Video Vol 1", released in 1991 by Central Video under the Video Collection International label; there was never a Volume 2.

"Is Nothing Sacred?" was released in 1992 by Surprise Video, compiling material from 1990 to 1991. The free booklet was written by Stewart Lee and Richard Herring. Havin' It Off: The Bonker's Guide was released in 1993. In 1996, FA to Fairplay was released on VHS; it was later released on DVD in 2005. Made exclusively for home video, it provided an alternative look at the 1996 European Football Championship.

The Ronald Reagan song "Da Do Run Ron" featured in a straight-to-video release titled Rockin' Ronnie (1986), an otherwise unrelated compilation of film clips released by ATI Video.

The first twelve series including an eleven-disc set (containing the first seven series broadcast from 1984–89) have been released by Network Distributing under licence by ITV Studios, so far. Series 1–7 individual releases are now deleted. DVD releases do not include any of the specials made.

=== DVD release dates ===
DVD	Discs	Year	Ep. #	Release date
DVD	Discs	Year	Ep. #	Region 2
Complete Series 1	2	1984	12	28 January 2008
Complete Series 2	2	1985	11	28 July 2008
Complete Series 3	3	1986	17	29 September 2008
Complete Series 4	1	1987	6	3 November 2008
Complete Series 5	1	1988	6	23 March 2009
Complete Series 6	1	1989	5	11 May 2009
Complete Series 7	1	1989	6	17 August 2009
Complete Series 8	1	1990	6	19 October 2009
Complete Series 9	1	1990	6	8 July 2013
Complete Series 10	1	1991	6	14 October 2013
Complete Series 11	1	1991	6	1 June 2015
Complete Series 12	1	1992	6	17 April 2016
Complete Series 1–7	11	1984–1989	64	2 November 2009

== Media adaptations ==
The show was adapted into a video game: Spitting Image and a comic magazine.

In Hungary, a home-made adaptation of the show was made under the title Uborka (Cucumber) between 1991–2002. This included Hungarian politicians such as the hungarian Prime Ministers Gyula Horn and Viktor Orbán.

== See also ==
- Cultural depictions of Margaret Thatcher
- Cultural depictions of Ronald Reagan
- Les Guignols de l'info
- Le Bébête Show
- Kukly
- Pupsnya
- The Wrong Coast
- Crapston Villas
- Headcases
- 2DTV
- The Mary Whitehouse Experience
- Have I Got News for You
- Land of Confusion
- The XYZ Show
- ZANEWS, also known as Puppet Nation ZA
- D.C. Follies
- Las noticias del guiñol
- The Winjin' Pom
- Rubbery Figures
- Newzoids
- Sooty
- Let's Be Real
- 31 Minutos
