= Pablo Bach =

Argentine plastic artist and cartoonist

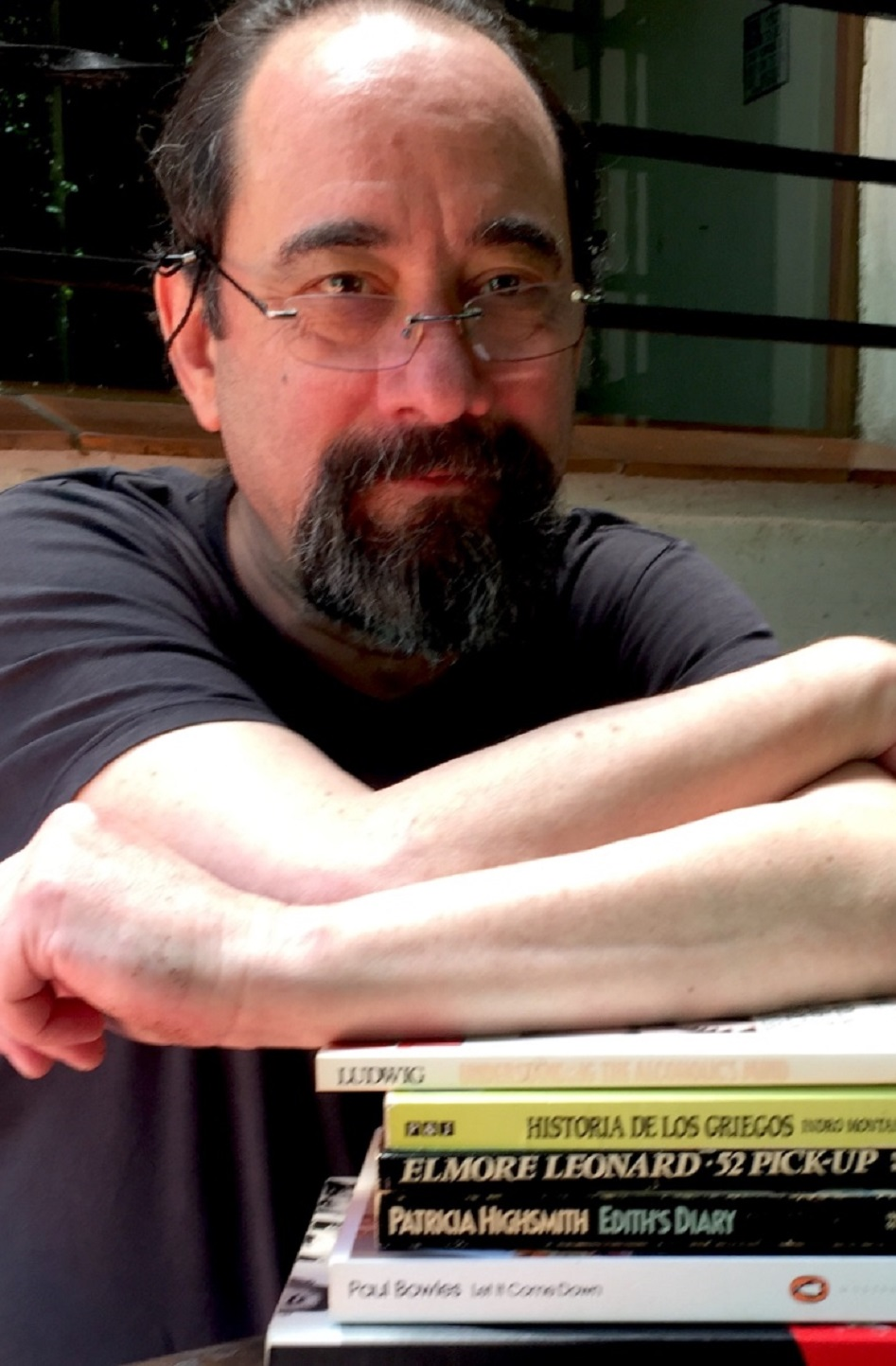
- Born: 1 March 1962 (age 64); Buenos Aires, Argentina
- Occupations: Cartoonist; Plastic artist
- Known for: Spitting Image; 2DTV

Pablo Bach (born 1 March 1962) is an Argentine plastic artist and cartoonist, mainly recognized for his work in the creative team of the British television show Spitting Image during fourteen years between the 1980s and 1990s. During his career he has worked as a graphic designer for other shows like 2DTV, New Captain Scarlet and Contra Informação.

== Biography ==
=== Early life ===
Bach was born in Buenos Aires, Argentina in 1962. After graduating in Fine Arts, he decided to emigrate to Europe at the age of 24 with the aim of settling in London to work as an artist, inspired by traditional English and French cartoons of the 18th and 19th centuries. There he contacted Oscar Grillo, an Argentinean illustrator and plastic artist who had been living in Europe for several years. Grillo recommended him to contact Peter Fluck and Roger Law, who were at that time designing a new television show.

=== Spitting Image ===
Thus, Bach linked professionally with the creative team of Spitting Image, a television show consisting of satirical sketches starring puppets representing important figures of British and international politics and society. He was responsible for designing the caricatures of the characters and then moulding them in clay to give the final shape to the puppets presented in the show. Spitting Image was broadcast between 1984 and 1996 by ITV network, obtaining multiple nominations for the BAFTA Awards and two Emmy Awards. Due to the controversial nature of the show, Bach had some problems renewing his work licence, but finally was able to obtain the British residency when a picture of Philip of Edinburgh with the artist was presented to the Ministry of Foreign Affairs during the inauguration of an allegorical gargoyle of his design, commissioned by the University of Cambridge.

=== Other projects ===
During his tenure in Spitting Image, Bach produced various editorial and artistic works, including covers for Time, Elle and Private Eye magazines, and a ceramic exhibition on the seven deadly sins in collaboration with the artist Janice Tchalenko in 1991, included in the catalog of the Victoria and Albert Museum in London. Between 2001 and 2004 Bach designed the cartoons for the British animation show 2DTV, considered as the successor to Spitting Image. A year later he was responsible for the creation of the figures of Murdoc Niccals and 2-D of the virtual group Gorillaz, used during their performances at the Manchester Opera House in 2005. That same year he was commissioned to design the characters for the new version of the science fiction series Captain Scarlet and for most of the decade he designed the characters used in the television show Contra Informação, the Portuguese version of Spitting Image. He was also part of the creative team for Wes Anderson's animated film, Isle of Dogs (2018).

Back in Argentina, Bach continued to produce artistic works, such as the exhibition El Reino de Bolonquia in collaboration with sculptor Jorge Maculán at the Galería Da Vinci in Recoleta, the sculptures of the four members of The Beatles in promotion of the Fashion and Clothing Design career at the ABM Institute in Buenos Aires, and the design of the sculpture by presenter and businessman Marcelo Tinelli on the occasion of his return to television in 2014 with his program Showmatch, among others.
