= The Big Story =

The Big Story or Big Story may refer to:

- "Big Story" (song), 2004 song by Steven Curtis Chapman
- The Big Story (radio and TV series), a radio and television series that aired on NBC in the 1940s and 1950s
- The Big Story (film), a 1994 British animated film
- The Big Story (TV program), a Philippine newscast show that aired on Bloomberg TV Philippines from 2016 to 2018 and on One News since 2018
- The Big Story (American TV series), broadcast on NBC (1949-1957) and then syndicated
