= Eliza Butterworth =

British actress

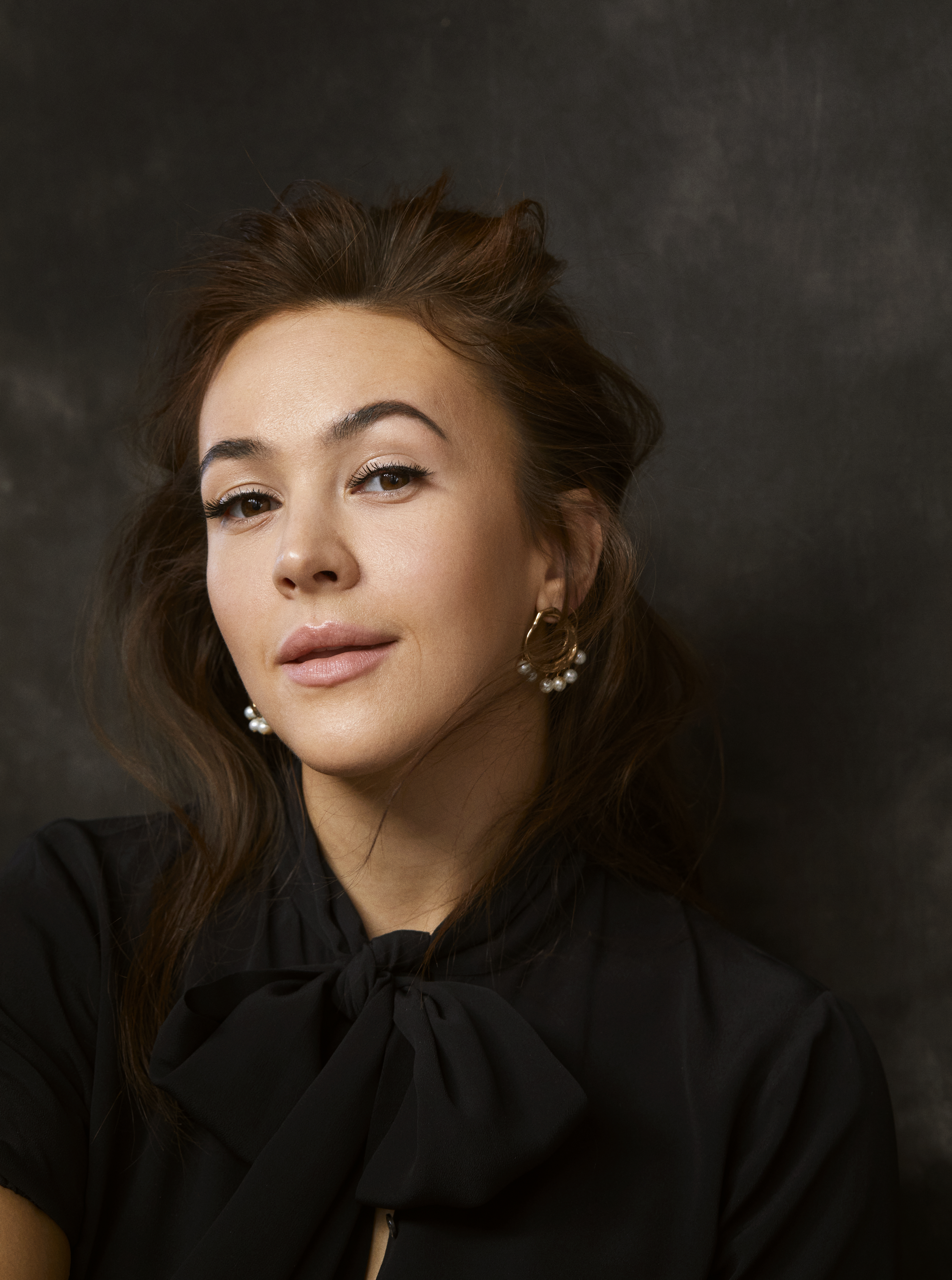
- Butterworth in 2021
- Born: Eliza Jane Butterworth; 24 July 1993 (age 33); Lincoln, Lincolnshire, England
- Education: Royal Academy of Dramatic Art
- Occupation: Actress
- Years active: 2014–present

Eliza Butterworth (born 24 July 1993) is an English actress. She is best known for her role as Lady Aelswith in the medieval drama The Last Kingdom (2015–2022). She has since appeared in the BBC Two miniseries The North Water (2020), for which she was nominated for a National Film Award, and the Sky Max series A Town Called Malice (2023).

== Early life and education ==
Butterworth was born and raised in Lincoln, England on 24 July 1993 to an English father from Lancashire and an Italian American mother from Iowa. Her parents met in Nebraska where her mother was training to be a nurse and her father, in the Royal Air Force, was stationed at Offutt Air Force Base. She has dual citizenship.

From the age of 4 to 18, Butterworth attended Lincoln Minster School. She discovered acting through a school play and was Head Girl. She went on to graduate with a Bachelor of Arts in Acting from the Royal Academy of Dramatic Art (RADA) in 2014. Whilst training at RADA, Butterworth performed lead roles in The Daughter in Law and The Witch of Edmonton.

== Career ==
Butterworth made guest appearances as Holly in DCI Banks and Lucy Hamilton in WPC 56, both in 2015. That same year, she began playing Aelswith, the wife of King Alfred the Great (David Dawson), in the BBC and later Netflix adaptation of The Last Kingdom. She started off in a recurring role for the first series before being promoted to the main cast for the subsequent four series.

In 2020, Butterworth appeared as Heston in the BBC Two miniseries The North Water alongside Colin Farrell and Stephen Graham. The same year she appeared as a webcam girl in the comedy film Say Your Prayers. In 2021, she made her West End debut as Princess Eugenie in the 2021 comedy play The Windsors: Endgame at the Prince of Wales Theatre.

In 2023, Butterworth starred in the Sky Max series A Town Called Malice, playing Carly of the Lord family, in a cast which includes Jason Flemyng, Daniel Sharman and Dougray Scott. The same year she was the voice of Masha in science fiction romantic comedy film The Pod Generation, which also starred Emilia Clarke and Chiwetel Ejiofor.

== Personal life ==
As of 2019, Butterworth is based in London. She is also an alto and mezzo-soprano singer, ballroom and flamenco dancer, and plays percussion.

== Filmography ==
=== Film ===
Year	Title	Role	Notes
2017	(A Very) Ham Fisted Steak Out	Erica	Short film
2017	Sometimes I Miss Them	Daughter	Short film
2020	Say Your Prayers	Webcam Girl	Film
2023	The Pod Generation	Masha (voice)	Film
2024	Little Brown Bird	Kate	Short film

=== Television ===
Year	Title	Role	Notes
2015	WPC 56	Lucy Hamilton	Episode: "A Different Beat"
2015	DCI Banks	Holly	Episode: "Buried: Part 1"
2015–2022	The Last Kingdom	Aelswith	Recurring role (series 1); Main role (series 2–5) 45 episodes
2020	The North Water	Hester	Miniseries; 2 episodes
2023	A Town Called Malice	Carly Lord	8 episodes
2023	inVERSE	Narrator	1 episode - S2.E3 "St. Crispin's Day"

== Stage ==
Year	Title	Role	Notes
2021	The Windsors: Endgame	Princess Eugenie	Prince of Wales Theatre, London

== Awards and nominations ==
Year 2026	Bedford Independent Film Festival	Best Supporting Actress in a Short Film	Chasing Adonis	Won	Ref.
2022	National Film Awards UK	Best Supporting Actress in a TV Series	The North Water	Nominated	
