= Tim Watts =

Tim Watts may refer to:

- Tim Watts (politician) (born 1982), member of the Australia House of Representatives
- Tim Watts (filmmaker), British film maker and caricaturist
- Timothy Watts, drummer for American heavy metal band Demon Hunter
