= Steve Bendelack =

English filmmaker and television director

- Occupations: Film director; Television director

Steve Bendelack is an English filmmaker and television director who has worked primarily on comedy programmes.

Originally an assistant to Peter Fluck and Roger Law on satirical TV puppet show Spitting Image, Bendelack went on to direct the show in later years. He directed The Mary Whitehouse Experience, The Royle Family, The League of Gentlemen, Dark Ages, Randall and Hopkirk (Deceased), Cowards and the first series of Little Britain. He directed the BBC3 pilot for The Mighty Boosh in 2003, but was replaced by Paul King for the series proper. He produced the opening scene for the 1990s edition of Whose Line Is It Anyway? for a short period, but stopped midway through the series. Bendelack has directed the feature films The League of Gentlemen's Apocalypse, Mr. Bean's Holiday and The Harry Hill Movie. Bendelack also directed the first series of Friday Night Dinner and the miniseries Ill Behaviour.
