= The Windsors: Endgame =

Play

- Written by: George Jeffrie; Bert Tyler-Moore
- Subject: British Monarchy, House of Windsor
- Genre: Comedy

Premiere
- Date: 2 August 2021
- Place: Prince of Wales Theatre, London

The Windsors: Endgame is a play by George Jeffrie and Bert Tyler-Moore based on their Channel 4 sitcom The Windsors. It is a parody of the British royal family, the House of Windsor.

== Production history ==
The play is directed by Michael Fentiman and was written by Bert Tyler-Moore and the late comedy writer George Jeffrie, who died on 19 September 2020 after writing the first draft of the script. The live show stars Harry Enfield, who reprises the role of the Charles from the TV sitcom, a character who is now seen in the production as the King.

On 24 June 2021, further casting was announced with Matthew Cottle, Tom-Durrant Pritchard and Tim Wallers (who also appeared in the sitcom) joining Enfield on stage.

The play opened at the Prince of Wales Theatre in London's West End on 2 August and ran until 9 October 2021.

== Reviews ==
Arifa Akbar in The Guardian gave The Windsors: Endgame a one star review and said that the spin-off was "akin to seeing Sex and the City: The Movie" with her high expectation "met by crashing disappointment", while the two star review in The Telegraph by Clive Davis stated that the play failed "to make use of its prime asset, Harry Enfield".

== Cast and characters ==
| Character | Cast |
|---|---|
| King Charles | Harry Enfield |
| Princess Eugenie | Eliza Butterworth |
| Meghan Markle | Crystal Condie |
| Prince Edward | Matthew Cottle |
| Sarah "Fergie" Ferguson | Sophie-Louise Dann |
| Prince Harry | Tom-Durrant Pritchard |
| Queen Camilla | Tracy-Ann Oberman |
| Prince William "Wills" | Ciarán Owens |
| Princess Beatrice | Jenny Rainsford |
| Princess Catherine "Kate" | Kara Tointon |
| Prince Andrew | Tim Wallers |
