= The Painkiller (play) =

Play by Sean Foley

The Painkiller is a play by Sean Foley, adapted from Francis Veber's Le Contrat. Best known as the author of Le Dîner de Cons, Veber specializes in creating double acts. Foley's adaptation received its world premiere at the Lyric Theatre, Belfast, on 29 September 2011. The production starred Kenneth Branagh, Rob Brydon and was directed by Foley.
