= David Stoten =

British film director

David Stoten is an English short film maker, director and caricaturist. He was born in Luton, Bedfordshire, and is mainly known for his association with TV's Spitting Image. Stoten won the BAFTA award with longtime collaborator, Tim Watts, in 1994 for The Big Story.

Since then, Stoten has provided storyboards for, amongst others, Corpse Bride, Mr. Bean's Holiday and the TV series Charlie and Lola.

Credited as one of the "Spitting Image team" (under Roger Law), Stoten provided the cover to 2007's QI "E" Annual, as well as contributing incidental illustrations. Stoten has been an ongoing contributor to The Oldie. In 2015, Stoten provided caricatures for the ITV show Newzoids.

As a sculptor, Stoten has made maquettes for the animation film industry whilst also sculpting a range of Gorillaz figures for the designer toy company Kidrobot.

Stoten was Head of Story for the animated Feature Film Gnomeo and Juliet and subsequently became the Creative Development Lead at Arc Productions in Toronto.

He directed the DVD Specials Thomas & Friends and was the head writer for Steam Team to the Rescue and the twenty-fourth (and final) series succeeding Andrew Brenner.
