= The Upstart Crow =

2020 play by Ben Elton

- Poster from the original London production
- Written by: Ben Elton
- Genre: Comedy
- Setting: 1605, London

Premiere
- Date: 7 February 2020
- Place: Gielgud Theatre, London

The Upstart Crow is a stage play by Ben Elton developed from his BBC TV sitcom Upstart Crow.

== Production history ==
The play, directed by Sean Foley, began previews at the Gielgud Theatre in London's West End on 7 February 2020, with an official opening night on 17 February. This was David Mitchell's stage debut. The play was intended to run until 25 April 2020, but only ran up to mid-March, with the remainder cancelled as a result of restrictions put in place due to the COVID-19 pandemic.

The play reopened in the West End at the Apollo Theatre for a ten-week season from 23 September until 3 December 2022, with Mitchell and Gemma Whelan reprising the roles of William Shakespeare and Kate.

== Cast and characters ==
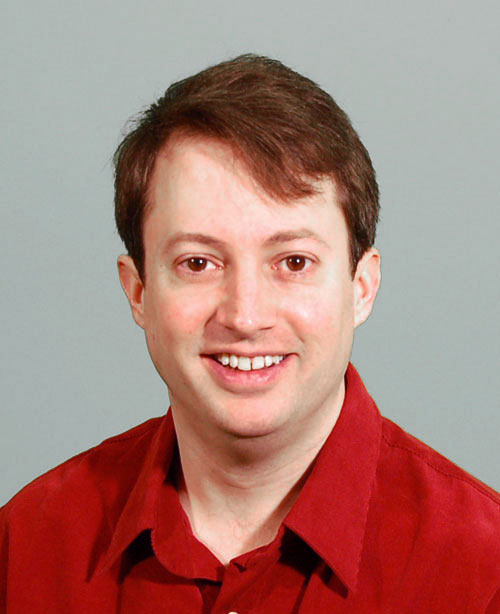
David Mitchell, who plays Shakespeare in both the TV sitcom and the first run of the stage play

The main cast or the Original London production included many who featured in the TV series, amongst them:

Character	London (2020)	London (2022)
William Shakespeare	David Mitchell	David Mitchell
Kate	Gemma Whelan	Gemma Whelan
Susanna Shakespeare	Helen Monks	Helen Monks
Ned Bottom	Rob Rouse	Rob Rouse
Richard Burbage	Steve Speirs	Stewart Wright
Dr. John Hall	Mark Heap	John Gordon Sinclair
Arragon	Jason Callender	Jason Callender
Desiree	Rachel Summers	Gloria Onitri
Judith	Danielle Phillips	Danielle Phillips
Dancing Bear / Cover		Reice Weathers
Cover		Andrew Hodges
Cover		Dedun Omole
Cover		Annabel Smith

== Synopsis ==
The play is set in 1605, with William Shakespeare depressed after the death of his son Hamnet, and needing to write a successful play to maintain his position. Ben Elton calls it "an entirely original excursion, not a 'TV adaption'".

The plot was summarised by the Evening Standard critic Nick Curtis: "Shakespeare gets over writer’s block by nicking ideas from other people. His landlady’s daughter, wannabe actress Kate gives him the plot of King Lear. A pair of noble Egyptian twins recall Twelfth Night — as does the humiliation-by-codpiece of Mark Heap’s lovestruck puritan — and also spark the idea for Othello."

== Reception ==
The play was well received by critics. Mark Lawson wrote in The Guardian: "Punchlines and slapstick are meticulously timed, culminating in a spectacular sight-gag involving costumes...including a bear suit, an unfeasibly large codpiece and an escalatingly testicular pair of the baggy-thighed trousers. Although some of the new Puritans who police our own culture may find the latter too broad, the mix of bawdy and scholarly references is authentically Shakespearean." In the Daily Telegraph, Dominic Cavendish wrote, "Ben Elton has restored himself to favour in theatreland with this joyously silly spin-off to his much-loved BBC Shakespeare sitcom." Nick Curtis in the Evening Standard called it, "funny but exhausting", and said: "You can spot the mile-off joke about The Winter’s Tale the moment the dancing bear appears."

== Awards ==
Year	Award Ceremony	Category	Nominee	Result
2020	Laurence Olivier Awards	Best Entertainment or Comedy Play		Nominated

== See also ==
- Greene's Groats-Worth of Wit - 1592 pamphlet, source of the phrase "upstart crow"
