= Astronomy Club: The Sketch Show =

2019 American television series

- Genre: Sketch comedy
- Created by: Jonathan Braylock; Raymond Cordova; James III; Caroline Martin; Jerah Milligan; Shawtane Monroe Bowen; Monique Moses; Keisha Zollar
- Written by: Jonathan Braylock; Raymond Cordova; James III; Caroline Martin; Jerah Milligan; Shawtane Monroe Bowen; Monique Moses; Keisha Zollar; Ray Cordova; Daniel Powell
- Directed by: J.J. Adler; Ryan Anthony Martin; Daniel Powell
- Country of origin: United States
- Original language: English
- No. of seasons: 1
- No. of episodes: 6

Production
- Executive producers: Kenya Barris; Alex Bach; Anni Weisband; Daniel Powell
- Production companies: Khalabo Ink Society; Irony Point

Original release
- Network: Netflix
- Release: December 6, 2019

Astronomy Club: The Sketch Show is an American sketch comedy television series created by the comedy troupe Astronomy Club, the Upright Citizens Brigade's first all Black team. The show stars the team's eight members: Shawtane Bowen, Jonathan Braylock, Ray Cordova, James III, Caroline Martin, Jerah Milligan, Monique Moses and Keisha Zollar. The show features comedy sketches, intermixed with clips from a reality television show where the members live together in a house. The series premiered on December 6, 2019 on Netflix. In June 2020, the series was canceled after one season.

== Synopsis ==
Sketches in the show deal with a range of issues, with a focus on the Black experience, race relations, and attitudes towards African-Americans in the media, and cinema in particular.

=== Structure ===
Each episode starts with a cold-open, a sketch before the opening credits. Segments between the sketches depict a fake reality show wherein the Astronomy Club members live together in the Astronomy Clubhouse, playing heightened versions of themselves. The show includes Big Brother-style confessionals, where cast members talk to the camera.

== Cast ==
- Shawtane Bowen
- Jonathan Braylock
- Ray Cordova
- James III
- Caroline Martin
- Jerah Milligan
- Monique Moses
- Keisha Zollar

=== Guest stars ===
- Drew Tarver
- Aisha Alfa
- Mike O'Gorman
- Ice Cube
- Jon Gabrus
- Busy Philipps
- Gillian Jacobs

== Episodes ==
No.	Title	Directed by	Written by	Original release date
1	"The Lamp Room"	JJ Adler & Ryan Anthony Martin	Jerah Milligan & Shawtane Monroe Bowen & Daniel Powell	December 6, 2019
2	"Ice Cube Day"	JJ Adler & Ryan Anthony Martin	Daniel Powell	December 6, 2019
Guest starring: Drew Tarver, Aisha Alfa, Mike O'Gorman.
3	"For the Culture"	JJ Adler & Ryan Anthony Martin & Daniel Powell	Daniel Powell	December 6, 2019
Special guest star: Ice Cube. Guest starring: Jon Gabrus.
4	"Murder Mystery"	JJ Adler & Ryan Anthony Martin & Daniel Powell	Jonathan Braylock & Ray Cordova & James III & Caroline Martin & Jerah Milligan & Shawtane Monroe Bowen & Monique Moses & Daniel Powell & Keisha Zollar	December 6, 2019
5	"Birthday Party"	JJ Adler & Ryan Anthony Martin	Jonathan Braylock & Ray Cordova & James III & Caroline Martin & Jerah Milligan & Shawtane Monroe Bowen & Monique Moses & Daniel Powell & Keisha Zollar	December 6, 2019
6	"Full House But Black"	JJ Adler & Ryan Anthony Martin	Jonathan Braylock & Ray Cordova & James III & Caroline Martin & Jerah Milligan & Shawtane Monroe Bowen & Monique Moses & Daniel Powell & Keisha Zollar	December 6, 2019
Special guest stars: Busy Philipps, Gillian Jacobs.

== Production ==
The show is produced under the banner of Khalabo Ink Society by producer Kenya Barris, creator of Black-ish. Barris developed Astronomy Club as a part of a $100 million development deal with Netflix.

According to an interview, the comedy troupe wanted the sketches to have a message, and "anytime one of [their] sketches tackles race, [they] have to make sure it says something."

=== Cancellation ===
On June 3, 2020, Netflix canceled the series after one season.

== Critical reception ==
The show received positive critical reception and is rated 100% on Rotten Tomatoes. Caroline Framke writing for Variety stated "This first episode sets the standard for “Astronomy Club” as clever, ambitious, and perhaps most importantly for a sketch show, both self-aware and completely ridiculous."
