= The Big Story (film) =

1994 British animated film

The Big Story is a 1994 British animated film by Tim Watts and David Stoten from Spitting Image Productions and starring Frank Gorshin (previously known as The Riddler on the 1960s TV version of Batman).

== Summary ==
A witty spoof on the films Kirk Douglas from various ages, a young 1950s reporter is looking for his big chance pleading his editor for a breaking story.

== Production ==
The film was animated twice: once hand-drawn and then again in stop-motion.

Quentin Tarantino requested this short to play before screening Pulp Fiction.

== Availability ==
Released on the now out-of-print Short 1-Invention DVD

== Accolades ==
- 1995: BAFTA Award for Best Short Animation (won)
- 1995: Academy Award for Best Animated Short Film (nominated)

== See also ==
- Ace in the Hole, the 1951 film about an ambitious reporter looking for a big story
- Postmodernist film
- Film noir
