= Puppets (TV series) =

Russian political satire TV show

- Logo (1994-1998)
- Genre: Political satire
- Written by: Viktor Shenderovich
- Country of origin: Russia
- Original language: Russian

Original release
- Network: NTV
- Release: 1994 – 2002

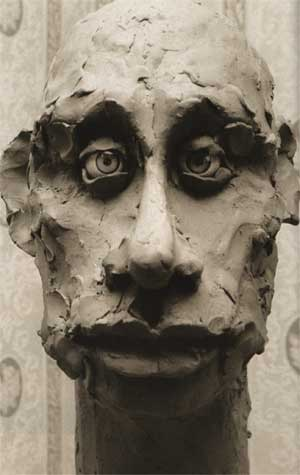
Puppets's unfinished puppet of Vladimir Putin, which was shown in his 2000 autobiography, On Behalf Of the First Person. Talks With Vladimir Putin.

Puppets (Russian: Куклы, romanized: Kukly, lit. 'Dolls') is a Russian political satire television series produced by Vasily Grigoryev. It originally aired on NTV from 1994 to 2002. It used puppets to represent celebrities, mainly the major politicians. It was inspired by the French series Les Guignols de l'info.

Puppets was widely viewed in Russia and has inspired spinoffs in other countries. President Vladimir Putin is frequently represented on the show.

== Legal controversies ==
The show's producing team was involved in several legal controversies. Viktor Shenderovich, a satirist and a writer for the show, has claimed that an unnamed top government official required NTV to exclude the puppet of Putin from the show. Accordingly, in the following episode, called "Ten Commandments", the puppet was replaced with a cloud covering the top of a mountain and a burning bush.

== Cancellation ==
During parliamentary elections in 1999 and presidential elections in 2000, NTV was critical of the Second Chechen War, Vladimir Putin and the political party Unity backed by him. In the puppet show Puppets in the beginning of February 2000, the puppet of Putin acted as Little Zaches in a story based on E.T.A. Hoffmann's Little Zaches Called Cinnabar, in which blindness causes villagers to mistake an evil gnome for a beautiful youth. This provoked a fierce reaction from Putin's supporters. On 8 February the newspaper Sankt-Peterburgskie Vedomosti published a letter signed by the Rector of St. Petersburg State University Lyudmila Verbitskaya, the Dean of its Law Department Nikolay Kropachyov and some of Putin's other presidential campaign assistants that urged the prosecution of the authors of the show for what they considered a criminal offence.

Putin's government took actions against NTV in response to the series, including raids on its parent media holding. These measures led to the cancellation of Puppets in 2002, as well as the expulsion of much of NTV’s editorial staff. Some Russian liberal journalists and public intellectuals at the time justified the actions against NTV and Kukly, arguing that strengthening the state was necessary to address the country's problems. Critics later described these responses as early signs of acquiescence to Putin's emerging repressive policies.

== Spitting in Russian ==
On January 1, 2010 the programme Spitting in Russian was broadcast by BBC Radio 4. Presented by Roger Law, co-creator of Spitting Image, it recounts how Russian programme-makers came to London to learn the art of making political puppets, and how the programme came to an end.
