= Dr. Strangelove (play) =

2024 play

- West End Promotional Poster
- Original language: English
- Written by: Armando Iannucci; Sean Foley
- Based on: Dr. Strangelove by Stanley Kubrick; Terry Southern; Peter George
- Genre: Black comedy Political Satire

Premiere
- Date: 8 October 2024
- Place: Noël Coward Theatre, London
- Directed by: Sean Foley

Dr. Strangelove (or Stanley Kubrick's Dr. Strangelove) is a comedy play based on the 1964 film of the same name by Stanley Kubrick, adapted for the stage by Armando Iannucci and Sean Foley.

== Production history ==
=== West End and Dublin (2024-25) ===
On 15 July 2023, it was announced that the adaptation would receive its world premiere in London's West End in the autumn of 2024. The show premiered on 8 October 2024 at the Noël Coward Theatre and ran until 25 January 2025 (after being extended from 21 December 2024). Steve Coogan starred in the production, playing multiple roles (as Peter Sellers had done in the film) and it was directed by Sean Foley. On 19 June 2024, it was announced Giles Terera would also star as General Buck Turgidson. Full casting was announced on 5 September 2024.

Following the London run, the production premiered on 5 February 2025 at the Bord Gáis Energy Theatre in Dublin and ran until 22 February 2025.

The production was filmed during its West End run and broadcast to cinemas worldwide from 27 March 2025 through National Theatre Live.

== Cast and characters ==
Characters	West End & Dublin
Characters	2024-25
Dr. Strangelove	Steve Coogan
Captain Mandrake	Steve Coogan
Merkin Muffley	Steve Coogan
Major TJ Kong	Steve Coogan
General Buck Turgidson	Giles Terera
General Jack D. Ripper	John Hopkins
Jefferson	Oliver Alvin-Wilson
Vera Lynn	Penny Ashmore
General Staines	Ben Deery
Frank	Richard Dempsey
Faceman	Mark Hadfield
Russian Ambassador Bakov	Tony Jayawardena
Lincoln	Dharmesh Patel
Colonel Bat Guano	Ben Turner
