= The Pod Generation =

2023 film by Sophie Barthes

- American theatrical release poster
- Directed by: Sophie Barthes
- Written by: Sophie Barthes
- Produced by: Geneviève Lemal; Yann Zenou; Nadia Kamlichi; Martin Metz
- Starring: Emilia Clarke; Chiwetel Ejiofor; Rosalie Craig; Vinette Robinson; Jean-Marc Barr
- Cinematography: Andrij Parekh
- Edited by: Ron Patane; Olivier Bugge Coutté
- Music by: Evgueni Galperine; Sasha Galperine
- Production companies: Scope Pictures; Quad Productions
- Distributed by: jour2fête Distribution (France); Lionsgate (United Kingdom)
- Release dates: 19 January 2023 (Sundance); 25 October 2023 (France)
- Running time: 110 minutes
- Countries: Belgium; France; United Kingdom
- Language: English
- Box office: $31,569

The Pod Generation is a 2023 science fiction romantic comedy film written and directed by Sophie Barthes.

The film premiered at the Sundance Film Festival on 19 January 2023.

== Plot ==
A New York couple, Rachel and Alvy, live in a not-so-distant future. A rising tech company executive, Rachel lands a coveted spot on the waitlist for the Womb Center, which offers couples maternity by way of detachable artificial wombs, or pods. Alvy, a botanist with an affection for nature, prefers a natural pregnancy. Despite their different perspectives, they decide to go forward with the Womb Center's services in order to conceive a child.

== Cast ==
- Emilia Clarke as Rachel Novy
- Chiwetel Ejiofor as Alvy Novy
- Megan Maczko as Elena; Novy Household "Cognitive Assistant"
- Vinette Robinson as Alice; Rachel's colleague and friend
- Jelle De Beule as Ben; Alice's Husband
- Eliza Butterworth as Masha; a new generation of "Cognitive Assistants"
- Rosalie Craig as Womb Center Director
- Kathryn Hunter as post office clerk
- Jean-Marc Barr as Pegazus founder

== Production ==
It was announced in October 2021 that Emilia Clarke and Chiwetel Ejiofor would star in the film, which was to be written and directed by Sophie Barthes. In May 2022, Rosalie Craig, Vinette Robinson and Kathryn Hunter were reported as added to the cast. Rita Bernard-Shaw and Megan Maczko were reported as part of the cast in November 2022.

Filming took place in March 2022 in Belgium.

== Release ==
The Pod Generation premiered at the Sundance Film Festival on 19 January 2023. In March 2023, Roadside Attractions and Vertical Entertainment acquired North America rights and released the film in limited cinemas on 11 August 2023. The film was released in France on 25 October.

== Reception ==
On the review aggregator website Rotten Tomatoes, 41% of 76 critics' reviews are positive, with an average rating of 5.6/10. The website's consensus reads: "With its roundabout script undermining solid performances from Emilia Clarke and Chiwetel Ejiofor, The Pod Generation stimulates the mind but not much else." Metacritic, which uses a weighted average, assigned the film a score of 60 out of 100, based on 22 critics, indicating "mixed or average" reviews.
