= Sean Foley (director) =

British director, writer, comedian and actor (born 1964)

- Born: John Foley; 21 November 1964 (age 61); Cleethorpes, Lincolnshire, England
- Education: University of Oxford; École Philippe Gaulier
- Occupations: Director; writer; comedian; actor
- Spouse: Alice Power (m. 1995)

Sean Foley (born John Foley; 21 November 1964) is a British director, writer, comedian and actor. Foley won two Olivier Awards with six additional nominations, and a Tony Award Nomination. Following early success as part of the comedy double act The Right Size and their long-running stage show The Play What I Wrote, Foley has more recently become a director, including of several West End comedy productions. From 2019 to 2024, he was appointed as artistic director of the Birmingham Repertory Theatre.

== Early career and The Right Size ==
Foley trained in clown under Philippe Gaulier at École Philippe Gaulier, where he met Hamish McColl. Foley and McColl formed The Right Size in 1988. They devised and performed in the shows, with regular creative team collaborators such as director Jozef Houben, designer Alice Power, and songwriter Chris Larner. Their style combined elements of clowning, physical comedy, mime, slapstick, vaudeville and variety. The Right Size's major successes were Do You Come Here Often?, about two strangers stuck in a bathroom for 25 years, and The Play What I Wrote, a tribute to Morecambe and Wise. The Right Size were active until 2006.

== Acting ==
Foley has played some major parts in traditional scripted roles, including Freud in Hysteria by Terry Johnson at Birmingham Rep in 2007, and the single role in the film of Samuel Beckett's Act Without Words I directed by Karel Reisz. He appeared alongside Mark Rylance in I Am Shakespeare at the Minerva Theatre, Chichester in 2007. He acted at the Oxford Youth Theatre before his time at the University of Oxford, where he studied history.

On television, he appeared as pub owner Jeff in all twelve episodes of the BBC One sitcom Wild West (2002–2004), playing opposite Dawn French and Catherine Tate. He then starred alongside Tate in the episode "The Patter of Tiny Feet" of the BBC Three comedy horror anthology series Twisted Tales (2005), and also directed The Catherine Tate Show Live tour years later in 2016.

== Writing and directing ==
Foley made his stage directorial debut in 2007 with Pinter's People. He then directed several stage shows by stand-up comedians including Joan Rivers, Nina Conti and Armstrong and Miller.

He achieved significant West End success in 2012, when he directed productions of The Ladykillers (for which he was nominated for the 2012 Laurence Olivier Award for Best Director) and Joe Orton's What the Butler Saw. He also, with Patrick Barlow, co-directed and co-wrote a four-actor stage adaptation of Ben Hur at the Watermill Theatre, a regional English theatre.

In 2013, Foley made his Royal Shakespeare Company debut, directing Thomas Middleton's A Mad World, My Masters. The production was well received by UK critics.

It was announced in June 2013 that Foley would be directing Matthew MacFadyen and Stephen Mangan in a theatrical adaptation of P. G. Wodehouse's Jeeves and Wooster stories, to be titled Perfect Nonsense, at the Duke of York's Theatre, London, from 30 October 2013. He also directed the X Factor stage musical, I Can't Sing! The X Factor Musical, which premiered in 2014 at the London Palladium and starred Nigel Harman, Alan Morrissey and Cynthia Erivo. However, the show was cancelled after 6 weeks and 3 days due to poor ticket sales, and lost £4 million.

Foley adapted and directed The Painkiller starring Kenneth Branagh and Rob Brydon during the Kenneth Branagh season at the Garrick Theatre in the West End in March 2016. He also adapted Eugène Ionesco's Amédée, or How to Get Rid of It starring Josie Lawrence and Trevor Fox in March 2017 at the Birmingham Repertory Theatre. He directed his and Phil Porter's adaptation of Molière's The Miser starring Griff Rhys Jones, Lee Mack and Mathew Horne at the Garrick Theatre in London, which was nominated for a 2018 Olivier Award for Best New Comedy. He also directed Noël Coward's Present Laughter for Chichester Festival Theatre in April 2018, starring Rufus Hound as Garry Essendine with Katherine Kingsley and Tracy-Ann Oberman.

Foley also adapted and directed The Man in the White Suit for the stage, starring Stephen Mangan and Kara Tointon, beginning at the Theatre Royal, Bath for three weeks, before transferring to the Wyndham's Theatre in the West End from 9 October until 7 December 2019.

In February 2020, Foley directed The Upstart Crow by Ben Elton, based on the BBC TV series with David Mitchell reprising his role as William Shakespeare at the Gielgud Theatre, London. The production was nominated for a Laurence Olivier Award for Best Entertainment or Comedy Play. However, due to the COVID-19 pandemic, the production closed early. The production was revived at London's Apollo Theatre from 23 September to 3 December 2022.

In July 2023, Foley directed The Crown Jewels by Simon Nye starring Al Murray, Carrie Hope Fletcher, Mel Giedroyc, Aidan McArdle, Neil Morrissey, Joe Thomas and Tanvi Virmani. The play opened at the Garrick Theatre in London, before touring the UK.

In October 2024, Foley directed a stage adaptation of Dr. Strangelove, based on the 1964 film by Stanley Kubrick, co-adapting with Armando Iannucci and starring Steve Coogan as Dr. Strangelove / Captain Mandrake / President Muffley / TJ Kong. It ran at the Noël Coward Theatre in London before running at the Bord Gáis Energy Theatre in February 2025.

=== Artistic Director of the Birmingham Repertory Theatre (2019-24) ===
In March 2019 it was announced that Foley was appointed to become artistic director of Birmingham Repertory Theatre succeeding Roxana Silbert. Foley's inaugural season was due to start in 2020 however, due to the COVID-19 pandemic it began in autumn 2021.

Foley's first production as director was a revival of his play The Play What I Wrote from 27 November 2021 until 1 January 2022, followed by The COVID-19 Variations: A Piano Drama composed by Richard Thomas, created by Alison Jackson and performed by Philip Edward Fisher from 8 to 9 February 2022. In February 2023, he directed and co-wrote with Al Murray and Matt Forde Idiots Assemble: Spitting Image The Musical based on the TV series Spitting Image. Following its run at The Rep, the production transferred to London's West End at the Phoenix Theatre from May for a limited run. In May 2024, Foley directed the world premiere of Withnail and I based on the 1987 film of the same name, adapted for the stage by the film's creator Bruce Robinson. On 18 April 2024, Foley announced he would be stepping down after 5 years in the role.

== Awards and nominations ==
=== Olivier Awards ===
Winner

- 1999 Best Entertainment, Do You Come Here Often
- 2002 Best Comedy, The Play What I Wrote

Nominations

- 2002 Best Actor (with Hamish McColl), The Play What I Wrote
- 2006 Best Entertainment, Ducktastic
- 2010 Best Entertainment, Arturo Brachetti: Change
- 2012 Best Director, The Ladykillers
- 2012 Best New Play, The Ladykillers
- 2018 Best New Comedy, The Miser

=== Tony Awards ===
Nominations

- 2003 Best Special Theatrical Event, The Play What I Wrote

== Selected other work ==
=== Theatre (as director) ===
| Year | Title | Playwright | Venue |
|---|---|---|---|
| 2011 | The Ladykillers | Graham Linehan | Liverpool Playhouse; Gielgud Theatre; UK tour |
| 2012 | What the Butler Saw | Joe Orton | Vaudeville Theatre |
| 2012 | Ben Hur | Patrick Barlow | Watermill Theatre |
| 2013 | A Mad World, My Masters | Thomas Middleton | Swan Theatre, Stratford-upon-Avon |
| 2013 | Jeeves and Wooster in Perfect Nonsense | David Goodale; Robert Goodale | Duke of York's Theatre; UK tour |
| 2014 | I Can't Sing! | Harry Hill; Steve Brown | London Palladium |
| 2016 | The Painkiller | Sean Foley | Garrick Theatre |
| 2016 | The Dresser | Ronald Harwood | UK tour |
| 2016 | The Catherine Tate Show Live | Catherine Tate | UK tour Wyndham's Theatre |
| 2017 | The Miser | Phil Potter; Sean Foley | Garrick Theatre |
| 2018 | Present Laughter | Noël Coward | Chichester Festival Theatre |
| 2019 | The Man in the White Suit | Sean Foley | Theatre Royal, Bath; Wyndham's Theatre |
| 2020 | The Upstart Crow | Ben Elton | Gielgud Theatre; Apollo Theatre |
| 2021 | The Play What I Wrote | Hamish McColl; Sean Foley; Eddie Braben | Birmingham Repertory Theatre; UK tour |
| 2023 | Idiots Assemble: Spitting Image The Musical | Al Murray; Matt Forde; Sean Foley | Birmingham Repertory Theatre; Phoenix Theatre |
| 2023 | The Crown Jewels | Simon Nye | Garrick Theatre; UK tour |
| 2024 | Withnail and I | Bruce Robinson | Birmingham Repertory Theatre |
| 2024 | Dr. Strangelove | Armando Iannucci; Sean Foley | Noël Coward Theatre; Bord Gáis Energy Theatre |

=== Television ===
- Spine Chillers
- Wild West
- Happiness
- People Like Us
- The Fitz
- Brass Eye

=== Radio ===
- The Remains of Foley and McColl
- Foley and McColl Again
- The Goldfish Bowl

=== Film ===
- Mindhorn (2016)
