= Katharine McMahon =

English novelist

Katharine McMahon is an historical novelist who, since 1990, has published ten books.

== Early life ==
McMahon studied English and Drama at University of Bristol and qualified as a teacher at Durham University in 1980.

== Career ==
Initially she worked in secondary education, but was later appointed as a writing fellow by the Royal Literary Fund at the University of Hertfordshire and University of Warwick. She currently works with the Royal Literary Fund as Head of Outreach.

She has worked as a tutor at the Arvon Foundation, and for several years taught the Guardian masterclass on Historical Fiction.

=== Novelist ===
McMahon's book The Alchemist's Daughter was one of Waterstone's Paperbacks of the Year in 2006.

The Rose of Sebastopol announced on 27 December 2007 as one of the ten titles for the Richard & Judy Book Club 2008. McMahon’s book was subsequently reviewed on the Channel 4 Richard & Judy Show on 24 January 2008. The Rose of Sebastopol was shortlisted for the Best Read Award at the Galaxy British Book Awards 2008. The Rose of Sebastopol was on the Sunday Times Best Seller List and was a Waterstone's No.1 Bestseller. In 2020 the book was released in a new edition with an additional chapter, to commemorate the 200th anniversary of Florence Nightingale.

In two subsequent novels, The Crimson Rooms, and The Woman in the Picture, McMahon introduced the character Evelyn Gifford, a pioneering female lawyer who struggles to gain a foothold in the legal world during the 1920s

The Hour of Separation, was released in paperback in 2019.

=== Magistrate ===
McMahon also trained as a magistrate in Hertfordshire and North London. She was appointed as course director by the Judicial College to design and run the national training course for Bench Chairmen. For five years she served on the Sentencing Council for England and Wales 2010-2015 and was subsequently appointed as a Judicial Appointments Commissioner. (2014-2017)

== Personal life ==
McMahon taught at schools local to Watford and the University of Hertfordshire.

McMahon was a magistrate and was involved with the Watford Palace Theatre. Her two daughters acted with the Watford Pump House Theatre and Arts Centre, and the Watford Palace Theatre Youth Theatre. Her son played football with Sun Postal. Her husband, Martin Rainsford, was a councillor. Jenny Rainsford is McMahon's daughter. She performs with the Abbey Theatre in St Albans.

McMahon's best friend is Mary Portas.

McMahon received Royal Literary Fellowships.

Katherine McMahon is a former Watford resident.

== Audio ==
- BBC Front Row July 2020 - discussing Hour of Separation
- Lockdown Litfest 2020
- Scrapbooks are Out of Fashion - a discussion of Florence Nightingale scrapbook

== Works ==
- The Hour of Separation (UK paperback) Weidenfeld & Nicolson 2019 ISBN 978-1474603461
- The Hour of Separation (UK Hardback) Weidenfeld & Nicolson 2018 ISBN 978-0297866060
- The Woman in the Picture (UK paperback) Weidenfeld & Nicolson 30 July 2015 ISBN 0-297-86603-6
- Writing Historical Fiction: A 60-Minute Masterclass] (Guardian Masterclasses Book 7)
- The Woman in the Picture Weidenfeld & Nicolson 3 July 2014 ISBN 0-297-86603-6
- Season of Light Weidenfeld & Nicolson 10 November 2011 ISBN 0-297-85339-2
- The Crimson Rooms (US paperback release) Berkley Trade 4 January 2011 ISBN 0-425-23858-X
- The Crimson Rooms (US release) Putnam Adult 1 February 2010 ISBN 0-399-15622-4
- The Crimson Rooms Weidenfeld & Nicolson 11 June 2009 ISBN 0-297-85338-4
- The Rose of Sebastopol Weidenfeld & Nicolson 2007 ISBN 0-7538-2374-8
- The Alchemist's Daughter Weidenfeld & Nicolson 2006 ISBN 0-297-85085-7
- After Mary Flamingo 2000, paperback 2001 ISBN 0-00-655155-6
- Confinement (Re-released) Phoenix 11 June 2009 ISBN 0-7538-2374-8
- Confinement Flamingo 1998, paperback 1999 ISBN 0-00-655080-0
- Footsteps (Re-released) Phoenix 2008 ISBN 0-7538-2544-9
- Footsteps Flamingo 1997, paperback 1998 ISBN 0-00-655037-1
- A Way through the Woods Sinclair Stevenson 1989, Bantam Books 1992 ISBN 0-553-40431-8
- Katharine McMahon. A Foot in Another World — Magistrates' Association
