= Pupsnya =

Ukrainian political satire TV show

Presenter Savik Shuster and guest Yulia Tymoshenko

Pupsnya (Ukrainian: Пупсня, lit. "puppets") was a weekly Ukrainian TV show of political satire and shown nightly Monday through Friday on TET during the 2007–2008 television season. It used puppets to represent politicians. It was similar to the Russian show Kukly.

It was produced by Yuri Stytskovskyy and mainly written by Sergey Steblynenko.
