= The Crown Jewels (play) =

- Production artwork
- Original language: English
- Written by: Simon Nye

Premiere
- Date: 7 July 2023
- Place: Garrick Theatre, London

The Crown Jewels is a comedy play by Simon Nye, based on Colonel Blood's attempt of stealing the Crown Jewels of England from the Tower of London in 1671.

== Production history ==
=== West End (2023) ===
The play made its world premiere at the Garrick Theatre in London's West End from 7 July and played a limited season through 16 September 2023. The production was directed by Sean Foley and starred Al Murray as King Charles II, Carrie Hope Fletcher, Mel Giedroyc, Aidan McArdle, Neil Morrissey, Joe Thomas and Tanvi Virmani.

=== UK National Tour (2023) ===
Following its West End run, the show embarked on a UK tour to The Lowry, Salford (19 to 23 September), Marlowe Theatre, Canterbury (25 to 30 September), New Theatre, Cardiff (3 to 7 October) and Milton Keynes Theatre (10 to 14 October).

== Cast and characters ==
| Character | West End | UK National Tour |
| Character | 2023 | |
|---|---|---|
| Charles II/Talbot Edwards | Al Murray | Al Murray |
| Mrs Edwards/French Noblewoman | Mel Giedroyc | Mel Giedroyc |
| Elizabeth Edwards/Lady of the bedchamber | Carrie Hope Fletcher | Carrie Hope Fletcher |
| Colonel Blood | Aidan McArdle | Aidan McArdle |
| Captain Perrot/Tourist | Neil Morrissey | Neil Morrissey |
| Tom Blood Jr/Suitor | Joe Thomas | Joe Thomas |
| Jenny Blaine/Jailer | Tanvi Virmani | Tanvi Virmani |
| Wythe Edwards/Footman | Adonis Siddique | Adonis Siddique |
| Footman 1 | Dedun Omole | Dedun Omole |
| Footman 2 | Emma Brown | Emma Brown |
| Footman 3 | Ryan Lane | Ryan Lane |
| Cover Charles II/Talbot Edwards | Kieran Brown | Kieran Brown |
