= Gaytime TV =

- Starring: Rhona Cameron; Richard Fairbrass; Bert Tyler-Moore
- Country of origin: United Kingdom
- Original language: English
- No. of series: 4
- No. of episodes: 29

Production
- Running time: 40 minutes

Original release
- Network: BBC2
- Release: 29 June 1995 – 27 July 1999

Gaytime TV was a late night gay-themed comedy and lifestyle magazine programme and broadcast on BBC 2 in the United Kingdom. It was the first regular BBC television programme to directly address the gay and lesbian community, and won praise from the Daily Mail in May 1996 for its "lightness of touch that other minority interest magazines would do well to emulate".

The series was first hosted by Rhona Cameron, and Bert Tyler-Moore, with Richard Fairbrass later replacing Tyler-Moore. The first programme was broadcast on 29 June 1995 and was last broadcast on 27 July 1999. It was a Planet 24 production. Segments included a weekly workout with porn star Mark Anthony, and one of the programme's traditions was to conclude with a torch song.
