= Jenny Rainsford =

English actress

- Born: 1985
- Education: University of Oxford; Royal Academy of Dramatic Art
- Occupation: Actress
- Children: 2

Jenny Rainsford is an English actress.

== Early life ==
Jenny Rainsford was born to Katharine McMahon and Martin Rainsford. A native of Watford, Rainsford was educated at Watford Grammar School for Girls.

At age 17, Rainsford first acted, in Macbeth, in Grand Central Station, in New York, for Andrew Mountbatten-Windsor and Rudy Giuliani.

She graduated with a degree in English from University of Oxford, worked in various jobs, then studied acting at the Royal Academy of Dramatic Art, from which she graduated in 2011.

== Career ==
In May 2013, Rainsford appeared in The Seagull at Oxford Playhouse via Nuffield Theatre, Southampton and Headlong, touring UK to 22 June 2013.

In May 2014, Rainsford appeared as Mrs. Fanny Wilton in Henrik Ibsen's John Gabriel Borkman for BBC Radio 4 Extra.

In May 2014, Rainsford appeared in Microcosm at Soho Theatre Upstairs while Phoebe Waller-Bridge appeared in Fleabag at Soho Theatre Main.

As well as her role as ”Boo”, while seven months pregnant, in the television series Fleabag, Rainsford's television credits include Finding Joy, The Smoke, Law and Order UK and Da Vinci's Demons.

Rainsford's film credits include Ridley Scott's film Prometheus (2012), About Time (2013), The Favourite (2018), Such A Lovely Day (2023), and The Death of a Farmer.

Rainsford's stage credits include productions for the Almeida Theatre (Daddy), Royal Shakespeare Company, Park Theatre (London) (Little Black Book, by Jean-Claude Carrière), Headlong, Royal Court Theatre, Young Vic, Rose Theatre Kingston (The Importance of Being Earnest), and Prince of Wales Theatre (The Windsors: Endgame, as Princess Beatrice).

In February 2019, Rainsford starred in Sir F. Mother Fucking Drake, Bea Roberts' filmed monologue about growing up in the shadow of Sir Francis Drake as a young woman, a wry pitch-black comedic nod to English imperial history, for the Young Vic Theatre.

In 2022, Rainsford's play Nanny (R&D with Folio Theatre) premiered at the Swindon Arts Centre, co-written with Alana Ramsey and Lizzie Stables and directed by Rainsford herself.

== Personal life ==
Rainsford married in April 2021, and lives in Camden with two children.
