= Bert Tyler-Moore =

British comedy writer (born 1963)

- Education: University of Bath
- Notable work: Gaytime TV, Pete versus Life, Spitting Image, Star Stories, The Kumars at No. 42, The Windsors: Endgame, The Windsors

Bert Tyler-Moore (born 7 July 1963) is a British TV comedy writer. With his writing partner George Jeffrie, he created and wrote the popular Channel 4 series Star Stories (2006–2008), Pete versus Life (2010–2011), and The Windsors (2016–present).

== Career ==
After graduating from the University of Bath in 1984, Tyler-Moore wrote and performed with the sketch trio On the Grapevine before becoming a stand-up comedian on the alternative comedy circuit. Between 1995 and 1996, he co-presented the BBC2 magazine show Gaytime TV.

Tyler-Moore began writing with George Jeffrie in 1997. They wrote for the sketch shows Armstrong and Miller, Big Train, and Harry Enfield's Brand Spanking New Show before going onto create their own shows for Channel Four. They also wrote episodes of the BBC sitcoms All About Me, My Family and In with the Flynns.

Jeffrie died of a sudden heart attack in September 2020. Tyler-Moore and Jeffrie's last work together was the stage version of the Windsors – The Windsors Endgame – which ran at the Prince of Wales theatre in London for ten weeks in 2021. Since then, Tyler-Moore has written for the 2020 relaunch of Spitting Image.
