= Say Your Prayers =

2020 film directed by Harry Michell

Say Your Prayers is a 2020 British black comedy film, which had a working title of Ilkley. The film stars Roger Allam, Derek Jacobi, Anna Maxwell Martin, Harry Melling, Vinette Robinson and Flora Spencer-Longhurst. Harry Michell directed the film and co-wrote the screenplay with Jamie Fraser, and the producer is Helen Simmons.

Principal photography started in February 2018 in Yorkshire, England. The film was released in September 2020.

== Cast ==
- Roger Allam
- Tom Brooke
- Derek Jacobi
- Anna Maxwell Martin
- Harry Melling
- Vinette Robinson
- Flora Spencer-Longhurst
