= Tim Watts (filmmaker) =

British film director (born 1965)

- Born: 19 September 1965 (age 60)
- Occupation: Filmmaker
- Known for: Animation
- Notable work: The Big Story

Tim Watts is a British short filmmaker and animator, best known for his work on The Big Story, which was nominated for an Academy Award, and The Boy, the Mole, the Fox and the Horse, for which he won an Annie Award. He is also known for his caricature work on TV's Spitting Image.

== Career ==
Tim Watts began as a caricaturist and designer on the satirical puppet show Spitting Image where he met his now longtime collaborator, David Stoten. It was at Spitting Image that Watts and Stoten had the idea to extend their caricature work to a full-figure puppet. After deciding on Kirk Douglas as the subject, the pair took the idea to Roger Law (executive producer for Spitting Image). Law was intrigued enough to fund the project that would become The Big Story.

Watts went on to animate on The Thief and the Cobbler, The Tale of Despereaux, Rise of the Guardians and Home, to storyboard and animate on Corpse Bride, and to create character designs and animate on Arthur Christmas.

== Accolades ==
Watts won the BAFTA award with David Stoten in 1994 for The Big Story.

In addition, he was nominated for an Academy Award for The Big Story at the 67th Academy Awards.

In 2023, Watts received the Annie Award for Character Animation in TV for his work on The Boy, the Mole, the Fox and the Horse at the 50th Annie Awards.
