= Lobo Chan =

British actor and opera singer

Lobo Chan (born 15 October 1960) is a British actor and opera singer, perhaps best known for his role in Peter Jackson's 2005 remake of King Kong.

== Filmography ==
- King Kong (2005) - Choy
- The Broken (2008) - Harry Lee
- Johnny English Reborn (2011) - Xiang Ping
- Cabin Pressure (Radio; 2013) - Chinese ATC
- Peaky Blinders (2013) - Mr Zhang
- My Best Friend's Wedding (2016) - Mr Meng
- Sarah Chong Is Going to Kill Herself (short film; 2016) - Papa Wei
- Killing Eve (TV; 2018) - Jin Yeong
- Spitting Image (TV; 2020) - Xi Jinping
- Thomas & Friends: All Engines Go! (TV; 2022) - Yong Bao (UK version)
