= Keisha Zollar =

American writer, comedian, and actress

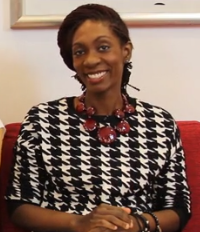
- Zollar in 2013
- Education: The New School (MFA)
- Occupations: Writer, comedian, actress
- Known for: Astronomy Club
- Spouse: Andrew Kimler

Keisha Zollar is an American writer, comedian, and actress. She is a founding member of Upright Citizen Brigade Theatre's first all-black team Astronomy Club and was co-head writer for the group's Netflix series. Zollar was on the writing staff of Busy Tonight, and The Opposition with Jordan Klepper.

== Career ==
Zollar began performing improv comedy in college. After receiving her MFA in acting from The New School, she started taking classes at UCB in New York. She names Lucille Ball, Moms Mabley, and Whoopi Goldberg as her comedic inspirations.

In 2013, Zollar and several other Black performers at UCB in Los Angeles formed the Astronomy Club. The group is known as the theater's first all-Black house team. In 2019, Netflix ordered a variety sketch series centered around the Astronomy Club, produced by Kenya Barris. The show premiered on December 6, 2019. Zollar and team member Jonathan Braylock are the show's co-head writers.

She acted in a supporting role as Grace on the HBO series Divorce and has also acted in Orange is the New Black and Human Kind Of. She was a staff writer for The Opposition with Jordan Klepper and Busy Tonight.

Zollar weaves the topic of race into her work. In 2015 she used Kickstarter to fund and host a panel discussion called "An Uncomfortable Conversation About Race." She and her husband, Andrew Kimler, also hosted an improv show about their interracial marriage. They co-host a podcast, Applying it Liberally, where they discuss their political beliefs.

Zollar teaches improv at the Pack Theater in Los Angeles.

=== UCB diversity work ===
Zollar has spoken about issues related to the recruitment, retention, and other systemic reasons for the lack of non-white performers at UCB and in mainstream improv comedy. She was hired as diversity coordinator at UCB in New York in 2010 and held the position for four years. The position was unpaid and included the cost of two classes every six months. She briefly left the theater before returning, citing isolation as one of the few women of color performers.

In June 2020, amid conversations about institutional racism in comedy sparked by the George Floyd protests, Zollar further tweeted about her experience as an unpaid diversity coordinator for UCB. The organization's official Twitter account replied that they would follow up with her "and look forward to resolving this as soon as possible."

== Personal life ==
Zollar is married to Andrew Kimler. The two have appeared on The Skin Deep YouTube series many times since 2016 to talk about their relationship. In an August 2023 episode of The Skin Deep, they revealed that they adopted a baby girl.
