= Pack Theater =

Improv and sketch comedy theater in Los Angeles, California

Coordinates: 34°5′26.448″N 118°19′50.736″W

- Genre: Sketch comedy Improvisation
- Date of premiere: 2016
- Location: Los Angeles, California, United States
- Official website

Pack Theater is a theater based in Los Angeles, California, specializing in improv and sketch comedy. The theater also operates a school for developing improv and comedy talent.

The Pack Theater grew out of the Miles Stroth Workshop, "focused on advanced training for improv comedians." Miles Stroth, a former student of Del Close, founded the workshop in 2007 after leaving his teaching job at iO West. He spun the workshop into a theater working from a 50-seat black box in 2016.

For each of its first four years, 2016–19, the Pack has hosted its own comedy festival, Pack Con. Pack Con performers have included Bob Odenkirk, Adam McKay, and The Whitest Kids U Know.
