= Jon Thoday =

British television executive

- Occupation(s): Joint-founder and Co Executive Chairman, producer, talent manager
- Organization: Avalon Entertainment
- Spouse: Leanne Newman

Jonathan Murray Thoday (born May 1961) is a British television executive and businessman. He is the joint-founder and Co-Executive Chairman at Avalon - the talent management, television production and live promotions group.

Thoday read Natural Sciences at Corpus Christi College, Cambridge, graduating in 1983. He later studied for an MSc in Biotechnology and Genetic Engineering. He is married to Leanne Newman and has two children.

== Shows ==
As a producer, he has been responsible for a number of shows, including Harry Hill's TV Burp, Not Going Out, and Russell Howard's Good News. He also worked with Frank Skinner and David Baddiel, to produce the single "Three Lions".

Thoday is Executive Producer on: Taskmaster (Channel 4 and nine original international versions running worldwide); multi-Emmy-winning Last Week Tonight with John Oliver (HBO); Not Going Out (BBC), the UK’s longest running sitcom on air; Spitting Image, The Rest Is Bulls*!t (YouTube); and is the producer of Operation Mincemeat, now in its third year in the West End, the show went on to win two Olivier Awards in 2024, including Best New Musical, before opening on Broadway in 2025, where it picked up a Tony Award.

Thoday has executive produced other landmark TV series including: Catastrophe (Channel 4/Amazon), TV Burp (ITV), Starstruck (BBC/HBO Max), Breeders (Sky/FX) and Workaholics (Comedy Central USA).

== About Gigs ==
Jon Thoday produced Newman and Baddiel: Live at Wembley, the first ever arena comedy show in British history, and Jerry Springer: The Opera by Richard Thomas and Stewart Lee, the first West End show to win all four ‘Best New Musical’ awards. Jon brokered the deal for iconic English soccer anthem Three Lions by David Baddiel, Frank Skinner and The Lightning Seeds which topped the UK Singles Chart a record-breaking four times.

Jon has Executive Produced many globally successful podcasts including the record-breaking multi-award-winning Sh**ged. Married. Annoyed with Chris and Rosie Ramsey.

The company has also produced seven Perrier and Edinburgh Comedy Award-winning shows at the Edinburgh Festival, as well as US comedian Denis Leary's iconic show No Cure For Cancer.

He is no stranger to controversy and has made the headlines on a number of occasions. He negotiated Frank Skinner's £20 million pound move from the BBC to ITV and also handled Adrian Chiles and subsequently Christine Bleakley's move to ITV. Along with BBC Director General/New York Times CEO Mark Thompson, Thoday became the last people to be prosecuted for blasphemy in the UK for his role as producer of Jerry Springer: The Opera. The charge was unsuccessful and a welcome change in the law.
