= Peter Fluck =

British caricaturist (1941–2026)

- Born: Peter Nigel Fluck; 7 April 1941; Cambridge, England
- Died: 21 November 2026 (aged 85); Cadgwith, Cornwall, England
- Education: Anglia Ruskin University
- Occupations: Caricaturist; satirist; sculpture; art teacher
- Notable work: Spitting Image
- Website: peterfluck.co.uk

Peter Nigel Fluck (7 April 1941 – 21 November 2026) was an English caricaturist and one half of the partnership known as Luck and Flaw (with Roger Law), creators of the popular satirical television puppet show Spitting Image (1984–1996).

== Early life and education ==
Peter Nigel Fluck was born on 7 April 1941 in Cambridge and attended Cambridgeshire High School for Boys, a grammar school, and then Cambridge School of Art (now part of Anglia Ruskin University).

== Career ==
Fluck taught art in the 1970s at the Colchester School of Art in Colchester, Essex..

After Spitting Image finished its run, he moved to Cornwall to work as an artist.

== Personal life ==
Fluck married Anne-Cécile de Bruyne in 1963 in Cambridge. They had a daughter and a son. He lived in Cadgwith, Cornwall.

Fluck died at home in Cornwall on 21 November 2026, aged 85.
