= Roger Law =

British caricaturist

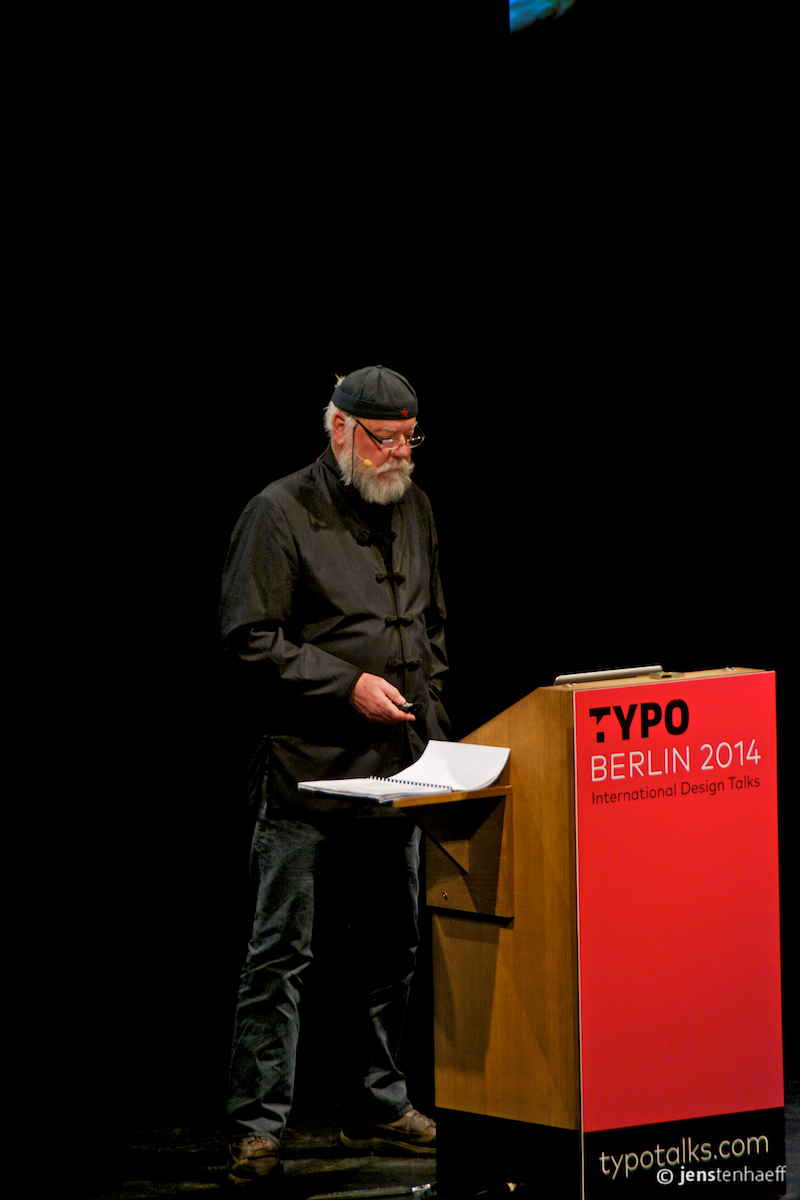
- Law speaking at the TYPO Berlin conference in 2014
- Born: 6 September 1941 (age 85); Littleport, Cambridgeshire, England
- Education: Anglia Ruskin University
- Occupations: Caricaturist; ceramicist
- Notable work: Spitting Image
- Spouse: Deirdre Amsden (m. 1960)
- Children: 2

Roger Law (born 6 September 1941) is an English caricaturist, ceramicist and one half of Luck and Flaw (with Peter Fluck), creators of the popular satirical television puppet show Spitting Image (1984–1996).

== Early life and education ==
Roger Law was born on 6 September 1941 in Littleport, Cambridgeshire. Law went to Littleport Secondary Modern School, and attended Cambridge School of Art (now part of Anglia Ruskin University). He met Peter Fluck during his time there.

== Career ==
He was an illustrator, comics artist and cartoonist for The Observer from 1962–65, then for The Sunday Times from 1965–67 and 1971-75 (where his colleagues included Francis Wyndham and Bruce Chatwin). At the Sunday Times he was active as a courtroom sketch artist. Law also co-designed the album covers of Axis: Bold As Love by Jimi Hendrix and The Who Sell Out (1967) by The Who.

After Spitting Image finished in 1996, Law became the artist in residence at the National Art School in Sydney. He subsequently moved to Jingdezhen, China where he makes large porcelain vessels. It was meeting the Australian-Chinese ceramicist Ah Xian, who in turn introduced him to the pottery workshops of Jingdezhen, that led Law to embark on a new artistic career.

A film by Catherine Hunter – described by one critic as "a cautionary tale of fame and the possibilities of new beginnings" – follows Law as he prepares work for an exhibition of ceramics at London's revered Victoria and Albert Museum. A feature documentary by Michael Coulson, called Still Spitting, was being produced in 2013, but as of 2020 it remains unreleased. The film tells the story of how Law's life as a caricaturist was dramatically changed by the demands of the Spitting Image TV show, reveals what happened to him after the show finished in 1996 and follows him as he strives to achieve his dream of making a "big pot" in China.

== Personal life ==
He married Deirdre Amsden (a quilt designer) in 1960 in Cambridge. They have a son (born 1962) and daughter (born 1965).

== Publications ==
- Spitting Images, CenturyHutchinson, 1987. (ISBN 978-0712617581)
- A Nasty Piece of Work: Art of "Spitting Image", Booth-Clibborn Editions 1992 (ISBN 978-1873968000)
- Law and Disorder: From Punch & Judy to Spitting Image - Four Centuries of Satire and Caricature, Mensch Publishing, 2027. (ISBN 978-1-912914-98-2)
