= Mered de Vries =

Dutch volleyball player

Personal information
- Full name: Mered de Vries
- Born: 25 September 1977 (age 49); Harich, Netherlands
- Hometown: Huizen, Netherlands
- Height: 1.74 m (5 ft 9 in)
- Weight: 64 kg (141 lb)

Beach volleyball information

Current teammate
| Years | Teammate | Tours (points) |
|---|---|---|
| 2005–2008 | Patricia Labee | 14 (237) |

Previous teammates
| Years | Teammate | Tours (points) |
|---|---|---|
| 2001; 2002; 2003; 2003; 2004; 2004; 2004 ? | Elske van Diepen; Merel Mooren; Jettie Fokkens; Jennifer Waninge; Sandra Wiegers; Ingrid Visser; Angel Link; Susan van den Heuvel | 1 (9); 2 (4); 3 (16); 1 (5); 2 (12); 1 (2); 1 (6) ? (?) |

Best results
| Years | Location | Result |
|---|---|---|
| 2005; 2005; 2006 | Alba Adriatica; Phuket; Cyprus | 5th 5th 7th |
- Last updated: 6 September 2006

Mered de Vries (born 25 September 1977) is a retired Dutch professional beach volleyball and indoor volleyball player born in the small village of Harich in Friesland.

De Vries played seven seasons at Dutch highest league participants AMVJ before she moved to Italy to play for Asystel Milan and Busto Arsizio. After 1.5 year in Italy she returned to the Netherlands and AMVJ to play there another year.

She started her international beach volleyball career in 2001 and teamed up with Elske van Diepen. They only played one international tournament together. During the years 2002, 2003 and 2004, de Vries teamed up with six different players without hardly making any progress. When she met Patricia Labee in 2005, she introduced her to beach volleyball. Together they finished 5th in only their third international tournament in Alba Adriatica. Later in Phuket they reached the same position. In 2006 their highest position was 7 at the Cyprus tournament.

In 2007, Sanne Keizer and Mered de Vries split up with Marrit Leenstra and Patricia Labee and started playing together. In 2008 they won the Dutch championship and became 5th during one of the most well known Grand Slams in Klagenfurt. They did not have enough points to make it to the Olympic Games Beijing 2008. By the end of 2008, Keizer and de Vries were ranked 13th at the world ranking. De Vries decided to focus on her working career after this.
