= Giulia Momoli =

Italian beach volleyball player

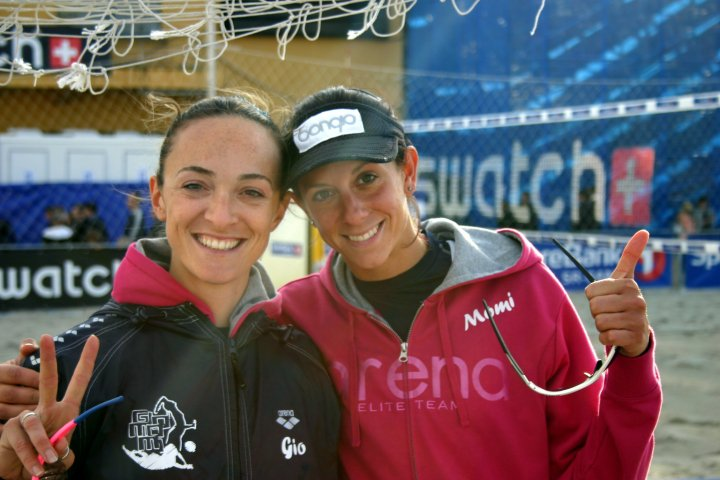
- From left, Daniela Gioria and Giulia Momoli

Personal information
- Born: 30 August 1981 (age 45); Asolo, Italy
- Height: 182 cm (6 ft 0 in)
Honours
Women's beach volleyball
Representing Italy
Italian Championships
Bronze medal – third place	2006	Beach
Gold medal – first place	2007	Beach
Bronze medal – third place	2008	Beach
Silver medal – second place	2009	Beach
Bronze medal – third place	2010	Beach

Giulia Momoli (born 30 August 1981 in Asolo) is an Italian beach volleyball player. She and Daniela Gioria were Italian Champions in 2007, and they were the second-best Italian couple in the FIVB World Ranking with the 20th position. From 2006, Momoli was involved in the World Tour. With 72 appearances, 229 international matches, and 18,573 points played, she was Italy's most active beach volleyball player. Together with Gioria, she was tried to qualify for London 2012 Olympics.

== School ==
She attended the first year of high school at “Cavanis” in Possagno, and from the second year (1996–97) moved to the School of Science and Technology "G. B. Quadri" in Vicenza, because she was called to play with Mosele Vicenza in the 4th Italian League. She graduated from the same high school in July 2000 and enrolled at the University of Padua in science of education. She graduated in June 2006, while she was a player in the 1st Italian League with Zoppas Conegliano (now Spes Volley Conegliano).

== Career ==
=== Volleyball ===
After winning the 4th League championship in 1996–97, 3rd League championship in 1997–98, she played in the 2nd League in 1998–99 with Vicenza, she moved the following year to Barbarano in the same League. In 2000–01 she played in the 2nd League with Sartori Padova winning the promotion to 1st League, where she also played the following year. She then moved to the 2nd League in the 2005–06 season with Zoppas Conegliano where she won the Italian Cup and the promotion in the 1st League. She moved to Rome to take part to the Italian National Beach Volleyball Team in 2006 and resumed during the winter her indoor career in the 2nd League 2008–09 with Monterotondo Volley and in 2009–10 with Promomedia Ostia VC.

=== Beach volleyball ===
In the summer of 2006, Momoli decided to devote herself solely to beach volleyball together with Daniela Gioria, winning the bronze medal in the Italian Championship and taking part in five competitions of the World Tour, with Gioria, Diletta Lunardi and Lucilla Perrotta, with whom she earned the first important result in her international career, the 17th place in Phuket, Thailand, in November 2006.

In 2007, after the two opening stages of World Tour where she partnered respectively with Daniela Gattelli and Lucilla Perrotta, she decided to run for the qualification of the 2008 Beijing Olympic Games teamed with Gioria. They took part in the Italian beach volleyball Championship. The made eight appearances in the World Tour, where they reached 4th place in a Satellite in Eboli. They won the Italian Championship on the beach of Ostia the same year, hitting three 17th places in the World Tour and ending up 43rd in the World Ranking.

In 2008, they collected 17 attendances at the World Tour and 2,138 points: a 17th placement, two 13th, four 9th and a 7th place in Sanya, China. They missed by only two positions the Olympic qualification, earning the 3rd place in the Italian Championship. They represented the 26th team in the world (the only Italian team in the first 40 positions). At the end of the year they were removed from the National Italian Team.

Since 2009, still with Gioria, they have been a freelance professional team representing Italy in international tournaments. They won the 2nd position in the Italian Championship, playing five stages of the European Championship and reaching the 5th place in the final of Sochi. They played 11 stages of the World Tour (four times 9th, once 13th and three times 17th) also picking up the best performance ever in the history of Italian beach volleyball at a Grand Slam, the 5th place in Marseille in July 2009. At the end of the season they were ranked 20th in the FIVB world ranking with 2,200 points, the Italian couple with the highest score in the world ranking, among men and women.

In 2010, they played and won the first two stages of the Italian Championship in Pescara and Maratea, finishing 4th at the third stage of Milan. They led the Italian championship with 640 points. In June, they won a stage at the Swiss Championship in Locarno. They had ten appearances at the World Tour collecting three 25th places (Shanghai Open, Grand Slam of Rome and The Hagues by forfeit) three 17th places (Grand Slam of Stavanger, Grand Slam of Gstaad and Kristiansand), three 9th places (Seoul Open, Grand Slam of Moscow and Phuket). Due to a compound fracture to the little finger of Gioria's right hand reported during a pool play held on July 8 at the Grand Slam of Gstaad (where after two forfeits they reached the 17th place), the couple were forced to stop and could not play the stage of Marseille Open and Grand Slam of Klagenfurt. With Patricia Labee, Momoli took part in the stage of Cesenatico, Italian Championship, finishing third. Still without Gioria, she played in the Final of Italian beach volleyball Championship, playing for first time ever with Lucia Bacchi, with whom after only three days of training she won the 3rd place.

She played the Kristiansand stage with the new Italian Champion Barbara Campanari. With Labee, she played and won an amateur tournament in Bibione. At the end of August, reunited with Gioria, she reached 13th place in Sanya – Cina – and was 9th place in Phuket – Thailand. With nine out of 15 tournaments played, they were the 27th couple in the World Ranking with 1500 points.

During 2011, she took part in the Olympic qualification process through the World Tour Ranking with Gioria. In Brasília at the season opening they qualified for the Main Draw in 25th place. In Sanya they failed to qualify for the Main Draw having lost the single elimination bracket, placing therefore 33rd. In Shanghai they took advantage of a Wild Card with the 25th seeding position, and after winning two matches they reached 17th place. In Myslowice, they qualified for the Main Draw and reached 17th place. In Bibione they won the amateur tournament from which they were sponsored. During the first Grand Slam of the season in Beijing in the same venue where the Giochi della XXIX Olimpiade was held, starting from the Qualification Tournament [Q8,25] with 5 wins and 2 losses (the last one against the World Champions, Kessy-Ross) they had their best seasonal result, 9th place, which brought them among the World's 20 best couples. During the World Championships held in Rome in the Foro Italico they missed the single elimination phase by just 3 points out of 120, therefore ending in 33rd place. During the second Grand Slam of the season played in Stavanger, Norway, they won for the first time in their career the pool in a Grand Slam advancing directly to the 8th finals, but losing against a team from Greece they ended in 9th place. With 5 victories in a row, and with a 3,333 set ratio, they had their best seasonal result [Q7, 25] to 9th place.

Momoli and Gioria occupied the 20th place with 1,020 points in the World Rankings FIVB WT, representing the second best Italian couple at the national and international level.

== Playing partners ==
- Daniela Gioria
- Daniela Gattelli
- Diletta Lunardi
- Lucilla Perrotta
- Patricia Labee
- Barbara Campanari
- Lucia Bacchi
