= Aldo Zilli =

Celebrity Chef

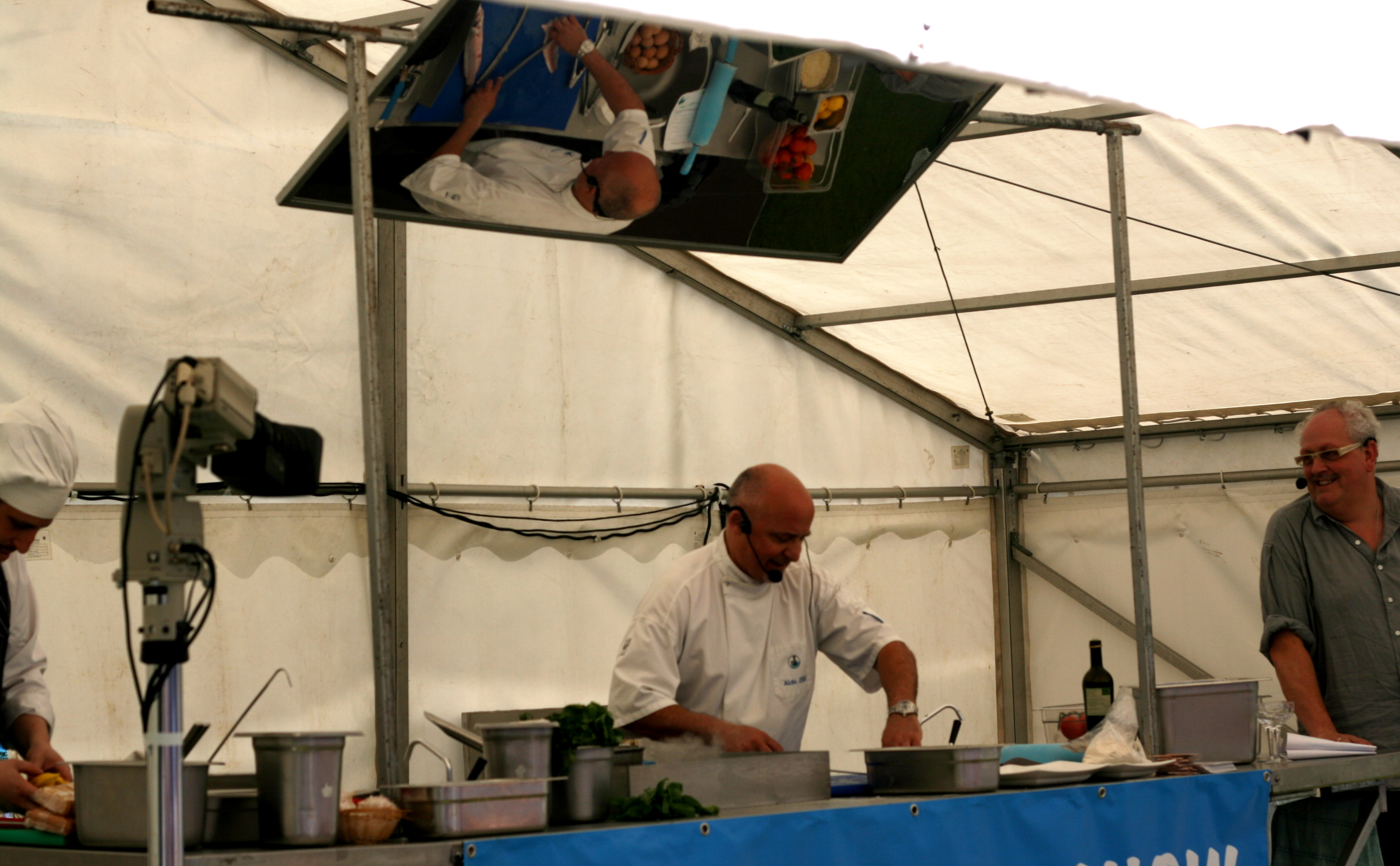
- Zilli demonstrating fish cookery at the 2008 Brighton & Hove Food and Drink Festival
- Born: 26 January 1956 (age 70); Alba Adriatica, Abruzzo, Italy
- Spouse(s): Jan Zilli (divorced) Nikki Zilli (m. 2005)
- Children: 3
- Culinary career
- Cooking style: Italian cuisine
- Current restaurants: Signor Zilli; Zilli Green; Zilli Café; Zilli Bar; Casa Zilli
- Television shows: Celebrity Masterchef; This Morning; The Alan Titchmarsh Show
- Website: www.aldozilli.com

Aldo Zilli (born 22 Jаnuary 1956) is an Italian celebrity chef specialising in Italian cuisine, based since 1976 in the United Kingdom. One of nine children, he was born in the small seaside town of Alba Adriatica in the central Italian region of Abruzzo, and moved to England at the age of 20.

He was the founder and chef-patron of London restaurants Signor Zilli, Zilli Green, Zilli Café, and Zilli Bar. His Italian seafood restaurant, Zilli Fish, closed in 2012.

Aldo has written 10 books including two autobiographies, Being Zilli and My Italian Country Childhood, as well as various cookery books. Fresh & Green: over 100 new exciting vegetarian recipes was featured in the Telegraph's Top Ten Cookery Books 2012. He has also written for many publications including The Sun, and currently writes a weekly column for the Daily Express Saturday magazine and presents a bi-weekly show on Soho Radio.

Zilli regularly appears on television and radio both as presenter and chef. His credits include being a judge on Celebrity Masterchef in 2014 and 2015, Who's Doing The Dishes?, The Alan Titchmarsh Show, This Morning, Lorraine, and Daybreak for ITV, Put Your Menu Where Your Mouth Is, and Country Show Cook Off for BBC2, The One Show, BBC3's The Real Hustle, and his own primetime ITV documentary Home Is Where The Heart Is.

He has appeared on television in One Man and His Hob, Good Food Live as well as in the third series of Celebrity Fit Club in 2005, in which he lost 15.5 kilos (2 stone 6 pounds), and impressed the panel so much they made him team captain replacing Julie Goodyear. His team won the series. He owns various restaurants around London, all with Zilli in their title.

He also appeared on Through the Keyhole on 15 March 2006, The X Factor: Battle of the Stars along with Jean-Christophe Novelli, Paul Rankin and Ross Burden and often made appearances on Big Brother's Little Brother.

As of 24 February 2009, Zilli holds the world record for the most times a pancake is flipped in 1 minute. He flipped it 117 times in the minute.

Zilli has also been working with various companies and brands, firstly with Thomson Airways by inspiring some creative ideas for airline meals, and then with Kraft Foods by preparing six recipes with Philadelphia soft cheese for the Heavenly Inspiration Website (www.heavenlyinspration.co.uk) and You Magazine.

He also appeared in the second treat on CBBC's Best of Friends, aired on 20 July 2009 in which he helped two girls make their own spaghetti.

In 2011 he partnered with Ethos Housewares to produce a range of cookware under the Aldo Zilli brand. This proved unsuccessful and it was discontinued through poor sales in the same year.

He also appeared as a guest on Sky One's Max Magic.

In summer 2010, Zilli appeared on "Lorraine Kelly's Big Fat Challenge", helping the Chawner family to lose weight through healthy eating.

Aldo and fellow chef Enzo Oliveri embarked on a culinary journey across Sicily for the Good Food Channel. More recently they completed a second series of Sicily with Aldo and Enzo in 2016.

In 2008 he teamed up with Dean Dunham to establish Baby Zilli, developing and selling organic baby food. It remained funded by the founders until 2011 when the company appointed Cavendish Corporate Finance to raise up to £2 million where an investor was reported to have been found although no evidence of this can be found. A £3.5million advertising campaign was reportedly launched The company appears to have closed down in the Summer of 2012.

His consultancy work includes that with Italian takeaway chain Firezza in 2015–2016, and Italian restaurant chain Prezzo, where his award-winning VIPizza proved extremely successful and led him to collaborate with M Kitchen at Morrisons supermarket nationwide where he now has eight products in their range, including DIVO cheese. In 2015 he became a brand ambassador for Saclà Italia, and in 2016 he also became brand ambassador for CocoPacific coconut oil.

Aldo has been a strong supporter of a number of charities over the years and is currently Patron for the charity Bowel Cancer UK.

His daughter, Laura, is a model and singer, who appears in Channel 4's Seven Days.

In 2019, he, with his partner chef Jean-Christophe Novelli, won the third season of the Channel 4 show Celebrity Hunted.
