= Fokkens =

Fokkens is a Dutch surname. Notable people with the surname include:

- Jettie Fokkens (born 1975), Dutch volleyball and beach volleyball player
- Robert Fokkens (fl. 1997), South African classical music composer
