= Cornwerd =

Cornwerd Koarnwert
- Village
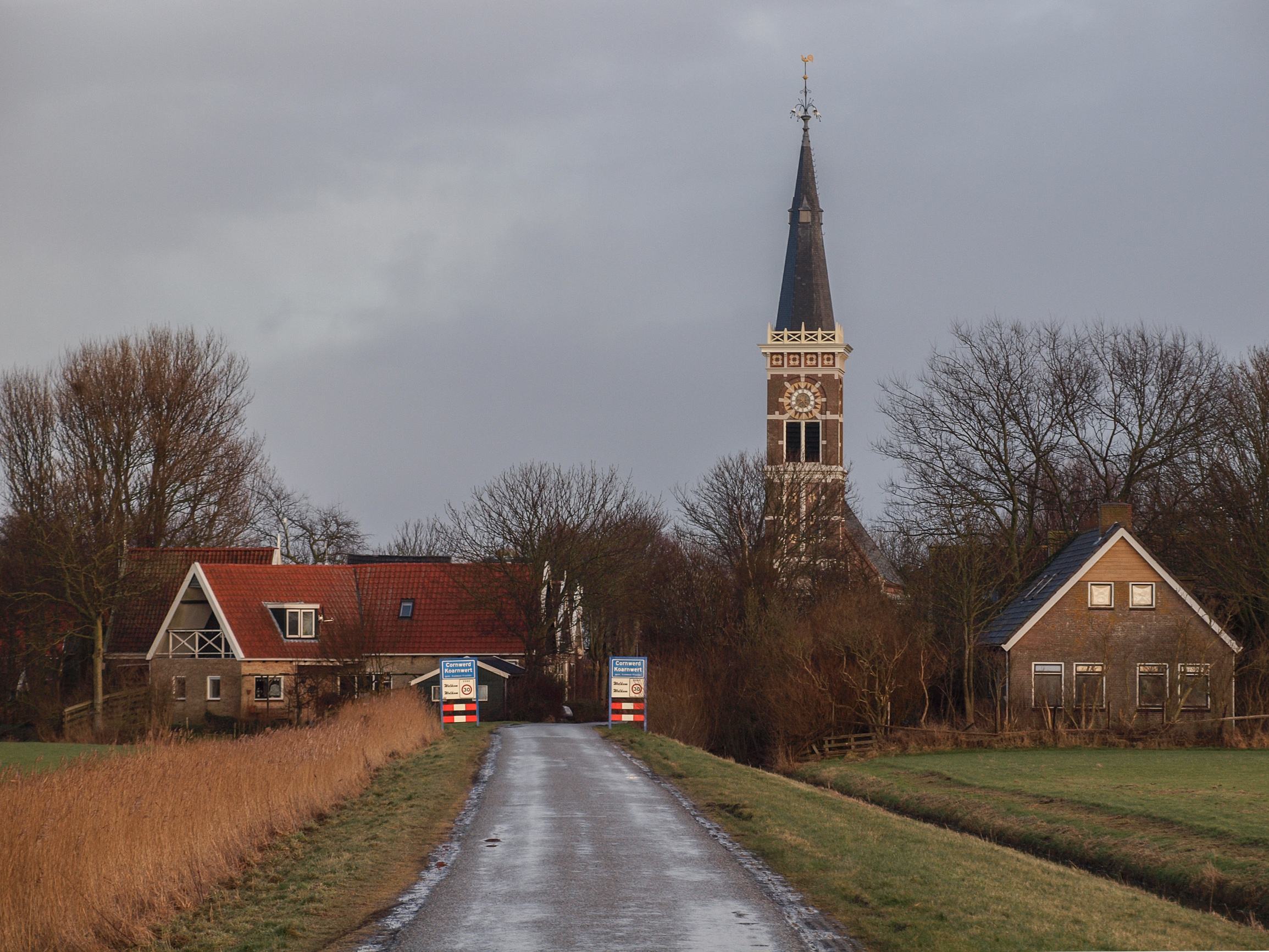

- Flag Coat of arms

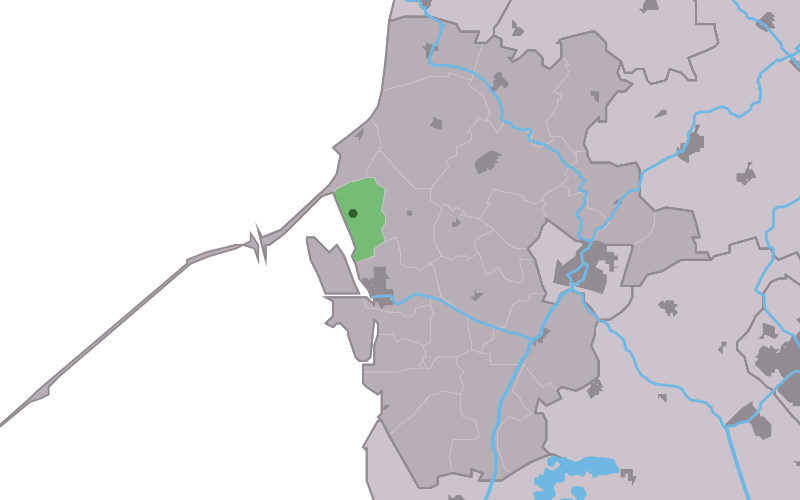
- Location in the former Wûnseradiel municipality

- Location in the Netherlands Cornwerd (Netherlands)
- Country: Netherlands
- Province: Friesland
- Municipality: Súdwest-Fryslân

Area
  - Total: 4.50 km^{2} (1.74 sq mi)
- Elevation: 0.3 m (0.98 ft)

Population (2021)
  - Total: 80
  - Density: 18/km^{2} (46/sq mi)
- Time zone: UTC+1 (CET)
  - Summer (DST): UTC+2 (CEST)
- Postal code: 8753
- Dialing code: 0515

Cornwerd (West Frisian: Koarnwert) is a small village in Súdwest-Fryslân municipality in the province of Friesland, the Netherlands. It had a population of around 85 in January 2017.

Cornwerd is home to the De Cornwerdermolen.

== History ==
The village was first mentioned in the 9th century as Quirnifurt, and means "terp with wind mill". Cornwerd used to be more important than neighbouring Makkum, because it was located on the only navigable canal, and a sconce was built near the village for defence. In 1345, the army of Holland was defeated, and for awhile the merchants from Holland were only allowed to trade in Harich, Cornwerd en Holwerd.

The Dutch Reformed church dates from 13th century. In 1898, the small saddle roof was replaced by a large tower. The polder mill Cornwerdermolen was built in 1907. It was devastated by a hurricane in 1972, and an engine was installed. In 1999, it was restored.

Cornwerd was home to 69 people in 1840.

Before 2011, the village was part of the Wûnseradiel municipality.

== Gallery ==
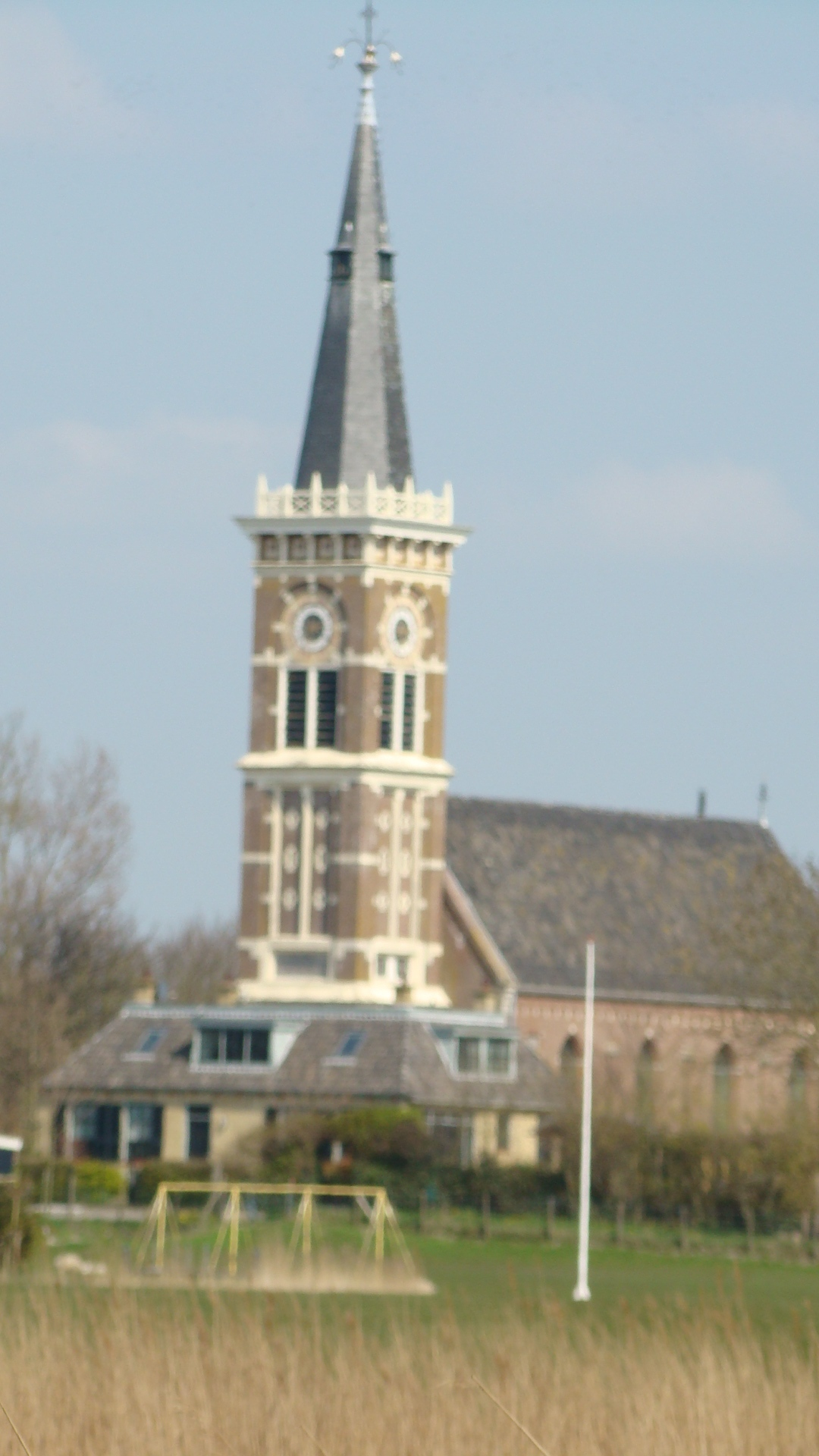
Church of Cornwerd

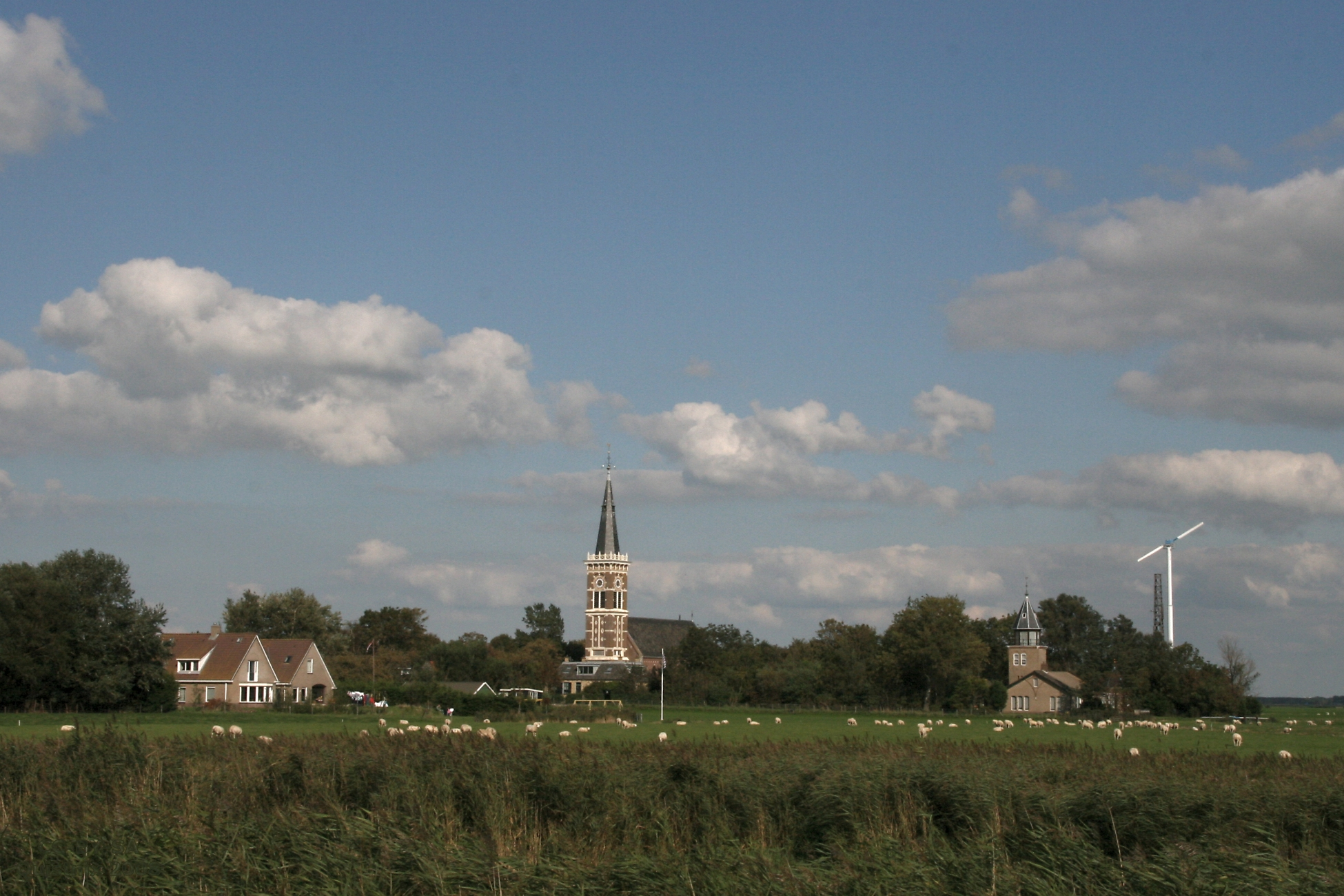
View on Cornwerd
