= Patricia Labee =

Dutch volleyball player

Personal information
- Born: 4 April 1977 (age 49); Rotterdam, The Netherlands
- Hometown: Ridderkerk, The Netherlands
- Height: 1.80 m (5 ft 11 in)
- Weight: 67 kg (148 lb)

Beach volleyball information

Current teammate
Years	Teammate	Tours (points)
2005-present	Mered de Vries	14 (237)

Best results
Years	Location	Result
2005; 2005; 2006	Alba Adriatica; Phuket; Cyprus	5th 5th 7th
- Last updated: 6 September 2006

Patricia Labee (born 4 April 1977) is a Dutch female professional beach volleyball and indoor volleyball player. She was born in Rotterdam.

Labee played ten seasons at Dutch highest league participants Sliedrecht Sport. She also played one season in Italy at Vicenza in the A1 and finally another season in the Netherlands at AMVJ.

She started her international beach volleyball career in 2005 and teamed up with Mered de Vries. Together they finished 5th in only their third international tournament in Alba Adriatica. Later in Phuket they reached the same position. In 2006 their highest position was 7 at the Cyprus tournament.

She also played one tournament (Cesenatico) of the Italian National Beach Volleyball Championship with Giulia Momoli where they took the third place.

Patricia Labee created her own sport clothing brand named STAR by GL together with her Italian partner Gian Maria Gasparri. The brand was founded in 2009 and is mainly focussing on volleyball, beach volleyball and basketball.
