= Al Murray =

English comedian (born 1968)

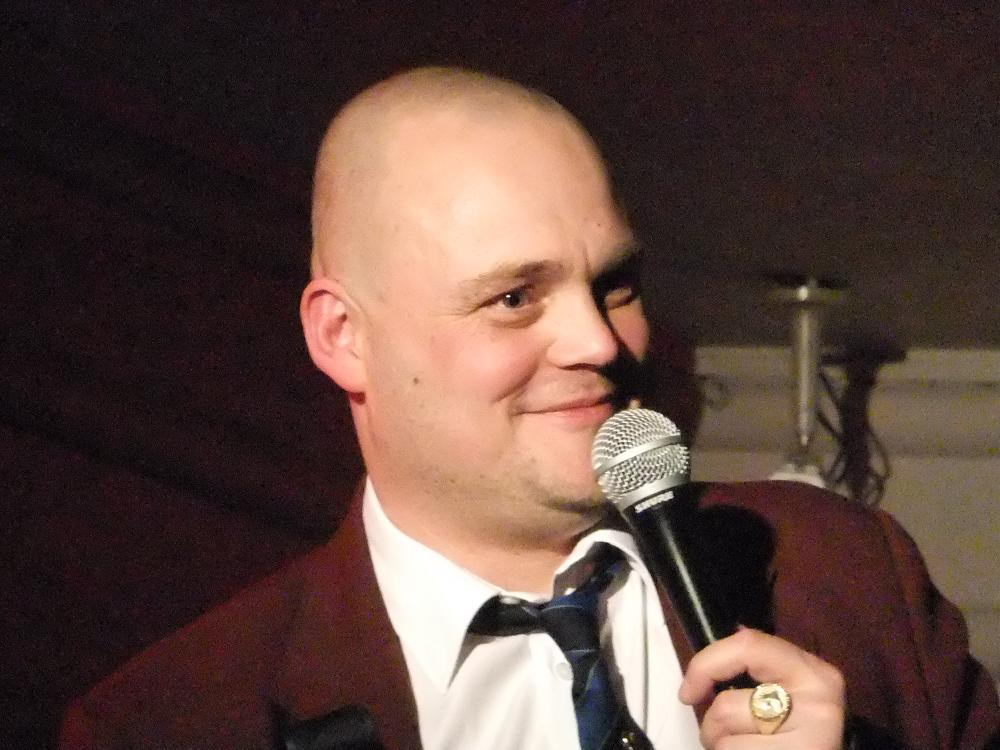
- Murray in 2011
- Born: Alastair James Hay Murray; 10 May 1968 (age 58); Stewkley, Buckinghamshire, England
- Education: St Edmund Hall, Oxford
- Notable work: Al Murray's Happy Hour; Time Gentlemen Please; Multiple Personality Disorder; Fact Hunt
- Spouses: Katherine Perry (m. 1995; div. 2000); Amber Hargreaves (m. 2002; sep. 2008)
- Children: 3
- Relatives: Ralph Murray (grandfather), Stephen Murray (great-uncle)

Comedy career
- Years active: 1991–present
- Medium: Stand-up; television; radio
- Genres: Character comedy; political satire; insult comedy
- Subjects: British culture; British politics; world history; current events
- Website: thepublandlord.com

Alastair James Hay Murray (born 10 May 1968) is an English comedian.

After graduating from the University of Oxford, Murray began his comedy career working with Harry Hill for BBC Radio 4. He regularly performed at the Edinburgh Festival Fringe, before launching his "Pub Landlord" persona. This led to the Sky One sitcom Time Gentlemen Please and the chat show Al Murray's Happy Hour for ITV.

In 2003, Murray was listed in The Observer as one of the 50 funniest acts in British comedy, and in 2007 he was voted the 16th greatest stand-up comic on Channel 4's 100 Greatest Stand-Ups. He continues to perform as a stand-up and is a regular on British TV and radio.

== Early life and family background ==
Murray was born in Stewkley, Buckinghamshire. His father was a lieutenant colonel in 131 (Parachute) Regiment, Royal Engineers and worked for British Rail. A descendant of the novelist William Makepeace Thackeray, Murray's grandfather was the former British ambassador Sir Ralph Murray, from the Scottish aristocracy and married into the Kuenberg family, Counts of the Holy Roman Empire. His maternal grandfather was killed in action at the Battle of Dunkirk. The actor Stephen Murray was his great-uncle, who died when Murray was fourteen.

Murray was educated at Bedford School. He played percussion in the Bedfordshire County Youth Orchestra, which was based in Bedford; the orchestra played concerts with the Bedfordshire county choirs. He also performed in the Bedfordshire second youth orchestra, in Dunstable. With the orchestra he performed in Spain, France and Scotland.

Murray later said of his time at school: "When I was nine I was sent to boarding school, which I despised and the first two weeks were the most miserable of my time there. The first five years were hideous because I wanted to be at home. I guess I resented my parents a little and it put tons of distance between us. One of the things I took from boarding school is that it made me emotionally self-sufficient." By sixteen, he was comfortable with school life and fully engaged with their drama club and his studies, leaving at eighteen to read Modern History at St Edmund Hall, Oxford.

On his first day, while carrying his drum kit to the college music room, he met Richard Herring and Stewart Lee who had just returned to Oxford, from performing comedy at their first Edinburgh Fringe. They introduced him to the fortnightly comedy group, the Oxford Revue, and he went on to perform in a sketch show, directed by Lee.

== Career ==
Having started out by touring with comedians such as Harry Hill and Frank Skinner, Murray won the Perrier Award at the Edinburgh Festival Fringe in 1999, after being nominated in 1996, 1997 and 1998. He started out with an act that involved sound-effect impressions, including guns, animals and a car boot. He made his first TV appearance on Channel 4's The Word in November 1991. With this act, he supported Jim Tavaré in Leeds in winter 1992.

In 1994–95, Murray was the drummer in the band Evangelista, the house band at Stewart Lee and Simon Munnery's experimental Cluub Zarathustra in London. Film maker Martin Pickles made a short film about the band in 2002. At this time the lead singer Reid said of Murray: "He's still not a household name, but anyone who's into comedy knows who Al Murray is".

=== The Pub Landlord ===
Murray's principal character in performance is an English publican with conservative values and an animosity towards Germans and the French; he challenges audience members to name any country before producing some plausible instance of Britain bettering it. The character has a great love of the British rock band Queen, often getting musician(s) on his show to perform one of Queen's tunes in their own style. He has described his persona as a "know-all know-nothing blowhard who knows the answer to every question even though he hasn't been asked any of them".

The character first appeared in 1994 during the Edinburgh Fringe Festival, in the show "Pub Internationale", with Harry Hill and Matthew Bradstock-Smith (who played "Little Alan" as well as the keyboards in Hill's Edinburgh, radio and TV shows). The show featured the "Pub Band", with Murray playing the drums and compering. After trying out a character deemed not to have worked, at the opening show Murray suggested saying that the compere had not made it to the show and that the barman in the venue, the Pleasance Cabaret Bar, had offered to fill in. At the Edinburgh Festival, Murray came up with "The Pub Landlord".

Murray made his first television appearances on Harry Hill in 1997 playing Harry's big brother Alan ("If it's too hard, I can't understand it!"), and subsequently featured in a short film, Pub Fiction. He made a brief appearance as the Pub Landlord in Series 2, Episode 6 of Lee and Herring's This Morning with Richard Not Judy. Murray's Pub Landlord theatre show, My Gaff, My Rules was short-listed for an Olivier Award in 2002.

The Pub Landlord is the central character in the television series Time Gentlemen Please. He has made many other television appearances, including the An Audience with... strand. He hosted three series of Al Murray's Happy Hour in a peak Saturday evening time slot for ITV in 2007–08.

The Pub Landlord has hosted television programmes including Fact Hunt, named after the fictional quiz machine of the same name from Time Gentlemen Please. In addition, the character has ghost written four books: The Pub Landlord's Book of British Common Sense, The Pub Landlord's Think Yourself British, The Pub Landlord's Great British Quiz Book and Let's Re-Great Britain.

=== Other work ===
Murray has an interest in music and is a semi-professional drummer. As a teenager, he played in the big band at Bedford School, and also played percussion in the Bedfordshire County Youth Orchestra. He plays drums for the rock covers band T-34 and appeared at the Download Festival in 2010, returning once again in 2011. Murray is a fan of the progressive rock bands Genesis, King Crimson and Yes. He appeared in the documentary Genesis: Together and Apart, and was the host of the 2019 Progressive Music Awards for Prog magazine.

Murray played in the Hampshire-located folk rock band Bemis.

In 2013, Murray guest-starred in series 5 of children's show Horrible Histories.

Murray presented Al Murray's Road to Berlin on the Discovery Channel. This was a series about the last phase of the Second World War, taking him from the beaches of Normandy, through Arnhem and up the Rhine, ending in Berlin. He drove around in a restored Willys jeep, and interviewed survivors from both sides of the war. In the episode about Operation Market Garden he parachuted, together with veterans, from an aircraft, to commemorate the battle.

Murray starred in Al Murray's Multiple Personality Disorder, a sketch show, which aired in early 2009. In late 2010, Murray made a documentary on German culture for BBC Four Al Murray's German Adventure in which he presented a different side of the German nation from the one portrayed by "The Pub Landlord" character.

Murray invented his own potato crisps – branded "Steak and Al Pie" – as entered in a "crisp competition" hosted by Gary Lineker, used to raise money for Comic Relief. The other flavours were "Jimmy Con Carne" (Jimmy Carr), "Stephen Fry-Up" (Stephen Fry) and "Frank Roast Dinner" (Frank Skinner). The winner was Stephen Fry-up at 27%, with Al's in second place with 25%. The other two gained 24% each.

In April 2016, Murray played Nick Bottom in Shakespeare Live, a celebration of 400 years of Shakespeare, opposite Judi Dench as Titania. In 2018 he starred in pantomime at the New Wimbledon Theatre, as Jack's brother Al, in Jack and the Beanstalk, winning 'Best Newcomer' for this role, at the Great British Pantomime Awards in April 2018. In 2016, Murray appeared in Taskmaster series 3. He finished third overall.

In October 2018, Murray fronted the History channel TV series Al Murray: Why Does Everyone Hate The English, appearing both as Al Murray and his alter-ego The Pub Landlord. The series looks at the historical rivalries between England and its closest neighbours and features comedians Antoine de Caunes, Elis James, Andrew Maxwell, Fred MacAulay and Henning Wehn representing their respective nations.

In 2019, Murray starred as his own ancestor William Makepeace Thackeray in a three-part BBC Radio 4 adaptation of Vanity Fair by Jim Poyser, with additional material by himself.

In April 2019, Murray started a podcast with historian James Holland called 'We Have Ways of Making You Talk', where they discuss battles and campaigns of World War II. Over 700 episodes have been released, including interviews with veterans and other historians, as well as Murray's narration of the book, 'The Cauldron' by Zeno.

In October 2021, Murray presented the Sky History programme Why Do the Brits Win Every War? In each episode, Murray was joined by a different guest in examining conflicts against the Romans, Vikings, Scottish, French, Americans, and Germans. The programme features Bruno Tonioli, John Thomson, Sanjeev Kohli, Reginald D. Hunter, and Henning Wehn.

In 2023, Murray co-wrote with Matt Forde and Sean Foley and is a voiceover artist Idiots Assemble: Spitting Image The Musical based on the TV series Spitting Image, which premiered at the Birmingham Repertory Theatre in February, before transferring to London's West End at the Phoenix Theatre in May for 13 weeks.

Murray played the part of King Charles II in The Crown Jewels, a play written by screenwriter Simon Nye and performed at the Garrick Theatre in London in 2023, about Colonel Blood's theft of the Crown Jewels in 1671.

In June 2024, he started the YouTube channel WW2 Headquarters with James Holland.

He published the book Arnhem: Black Tuesday in September 2024.

== Parliamentary candidacy ==
On 14 January 2015, Murray announced his formation of the "Free United Kingdom Party" (FUKP) and declared his candidacy, deploying his Pub Landlord persona, for the seat of South Thanet running against UKIP leader Nigel Farage, as parliamentary candidate in the 2015 general election. Murray's agent, Dan Lloyd, told the BBC: "it's definitely happening". The party's logo is an upside-down pound sign, not dissimilar to UKIP's purple and gold pound sign. Murray said: "it seems to me that the UK is ready for a bloke waving a pint around, offering common sense solutions", adding: "let it be known that like many of the parliamentary hopefuls in the forthcoming election, I have no idea where South Thanet is – but did that stop Margaret Thatcher from saving the Falkland Islands? No!"

Farage appeared to welcome his new opponent on Twitter, saying "the more, the merrier", and a spokesperson for the UKIP MEP said: "at last, serious competition in the constituency". The Conservative candidate, Craig Mackinlay, said he enjoyed Murray's video and his proclamations but was not worried that the comedian would split the anti-UKIP vote. Finally, the Labour candidate, Will Scobie, said it was "always good to have people putting their names forward to stand" and that Murray would "certainly make things interesting". When nominations for South Thanet were released on 9 April 2015, it was confirmed that Murray would appear on the ballot paper with no description, rather than his FUKP name and emblem.

The results of the election were announced on 8 May, revealing that Murray received 318 votes. When it was announced that Farage had failed to get elected, coming second in the poll to the Conservative candidate Craig Mackinlay, Murray's reaction – feigning shock and clapping on stage – garnered widespread media attention. Speaking to the media during the vote count, Murray invited Farage to a drink in his pub to "drown his sorrow" at losing.

== Political views and activism ==
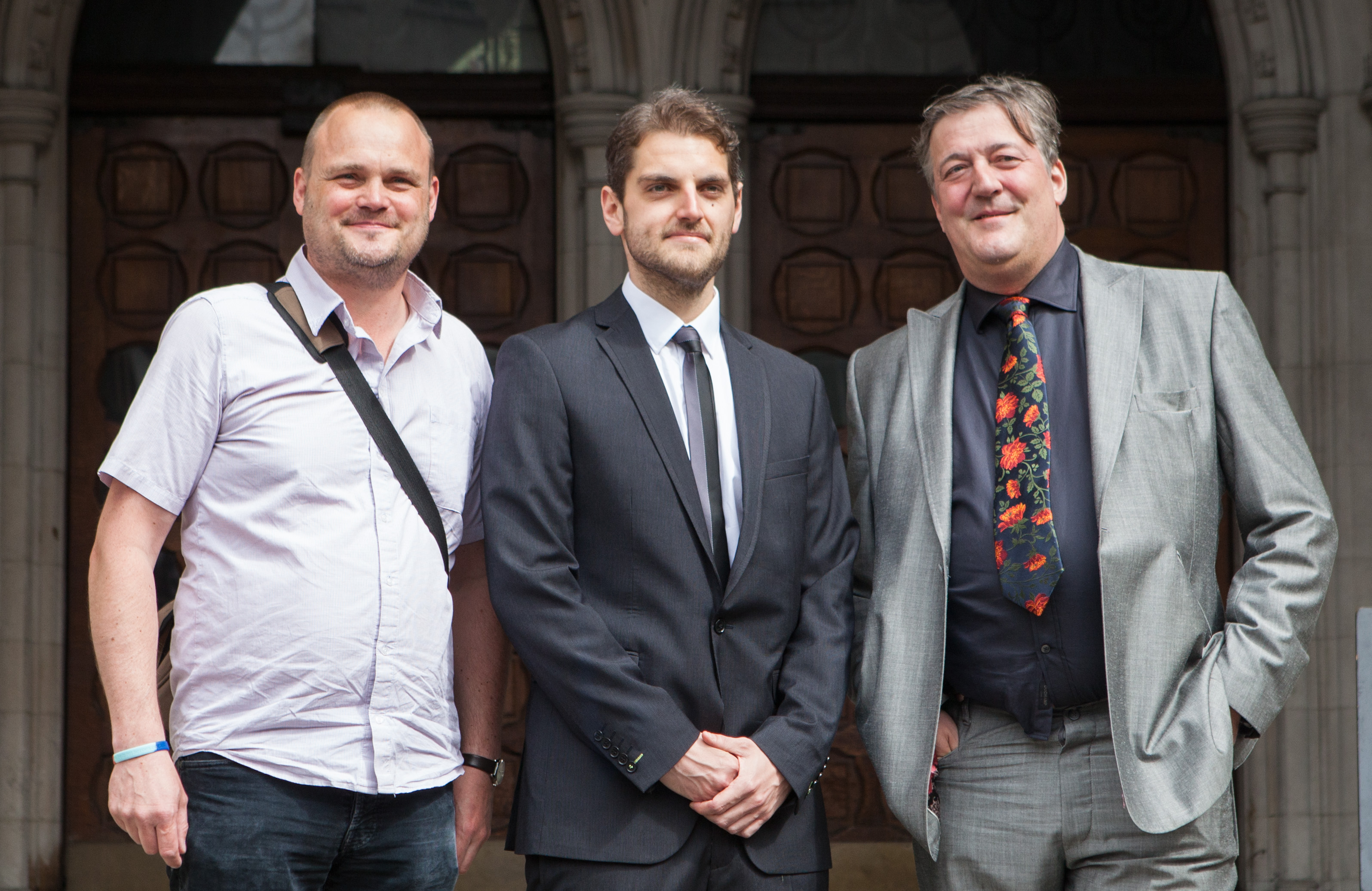
Murray with Paul Chambers (centre) and Stephen Fry (right) outside the Royal Courts of Justice, London on 27 June 2012

Murray, together with Stephen Fry, supported Paul Chambers's High Court appeals after Chambers had been arrested for contravening the Communications Act 2003 when a joke tweet was regarded by police as "menacing" and a terrorist threat. An appeal against Chambers's conviction was successful.

In August 2014, Murray was one of 200 public figures who were signatories to a letter to The Guardian expressing their hope that Scotland would vote to remain part of the United Kingdom in September's referendum on that issue.

== Personal life ==
Murray married Amber Hargreaves in 2002. The couple, who have two daughters, separated in 2008. He now resides in Chiswick. He subsequently had a third daughter, Daisy, with his partner, Eleanor Relf, in 2018.

Murray is a keen cricket fan, and was invited to attend a farewell lunch for the England cricket team before their departure for the 2013–14 Ashes series.

Murray was awarded an honorary degree (Hon MA) by the University of Bedfordshire in 2014, and an honorary doctorate of Social Science (Hon SScD) by the University of Wolverhampton in 2017.

== Stand-up shows ==
Year	Title	Notes
1999	Late Lock-in '99	
2000	...And A Glass of White Wine for the Lady!	
2001	My Gaff, My Rules	
2002–2003	Who Dares Wins	
2003–2005	Giving it Both Barrels	
2006	...And Another Thing	
2009	Beautiful British Tour	
2010–2011	Barrel of Fun	
2012–2013	The Only Way Is Epic	
2014–2015	One Man, One Guvnor	
2016–2017	Let's Go Backwards Together	
2019–2021	Landlord of Hope & Glory	
2022–2023	Gig for Victory	
2023–2025	Guv Island	
2026	All You Need is Guv	

=== DVD releases ===
Show Title	Released	Notes
Live - My Gaff, My Rules	24 November 2003	Live at London's Playhouse Theatre
...And A Glass of White Wine for the Lady!: Recorded Live at the Playhouse London	22 November 2004	Live at London's Playhouse Theatre
Giving It Both Barrels: Live	29 May 2006	Live at London's Bloomsbury Theatre
Live at the London Palladium	19 November 2007	Live at London's Palladium Theatre
Beautiful British Tour: Live at the O2	16 November 2009	Live at London's O2 Arena
Barrel of Fun: Live	22 November 2010	Live at London's Hammersmith Apollo
The Only Way Is Epic	26 November 2012	Live at Brighton's Theatre Royal
One Man, One Guvnor	24 November 2014	Live at Bath's Theatre Royal

== Books ==
Title	Published
The Pub Landlord's Book of British Common Sense	11 October 2007
The Pub Landlord's Think Yourself British	5 October 2009
The Pub Landlord's Great British Pub Quiz Book	28 October 2010
Watching War Films with My Dad	24 October 2013
Let's Re-Great Britain	1 April 2015
The Last 100 Years (Give or Take) and All That	29 October 2020
Command: How the Allies Learned to Win the Second World War	13 October 2022
Arnhem Black Tuesday: The Classic Battle Told as Never Before	12 September 2024
Victory '45 - The End of the War in Eight Surrenders (Co-written with James Holland)	24 April 2025

== See also ==
- Clan Murray
