= Fact Hunt =

- Genre: Comedy game show
- Created by: Al Murray; Nick Symons
- Presented by: Al Murray
- Country of origin: United Kingdom
- Original language: English
- No. of series: 1
- No. of episodes: 7

Production
- Running time: 35 minutes

Original release
- Network: ITV
- Release: 4 November – 16 December 2005

Related
- Time Gentlemen Please

Fact Hunt (2005) is a comedic TV quiz show which originally aired late at night on various ITV regions. It was hosted by Al Murray in character as the Pub Landlord, the character he has long played in stand-up routines and in the sitcom Time Gentlemen Please.

Fact Hunt was originally a section of Al Murray's Edinburgh stage show, where two male members of the audience were called on stage to answer questions. The idea was further developed into a fictional pub quiz machine (and on-going plot device) of the same name from a sitcom starring Al Murray called Time Gentlemen Please. This programme ran for two complete seasons between 2000 and 2002 on Sky One and was the first time Al Murray's Pub landlord character was in a scripted sitcom format.

It wasn't until the success of Al Murray's main ITV show that a further spin off show wholly based on the quiz, which was called Fact Hunt.
