= Stag Night of the Dead =

- Directed by: Neil Jones
- Written by: Neil Jones
- Starring: Sebastian Street; Rez Kempton; Jeff Rudom; Sophie Lovell Anderson
- Cinematography: Richard J Wood
- Music by: Christopher Barnett
- Distributed by: Left Films
- Release date: October 31, 2010 (UK)
- Running time: 81 min
- Country: United Kingdom
- Language: English
- Budget: £150,000

Stag Night of the Dead is a 2010 low budget British comedy horror film, written and directed by Neil "Napoleon" Jones.

== Plot ==
In the aftermath of a pandemic infection that has turned large numbers of the population into zombies, a group of men embark on a stag weekend for their friend Dean ahead of his impending wedding. As part of the entertainment, the party travel to an old military base where some of these zombies are being put to use as targets in zomball, a twist on the game of paintball.

== Production ==
Filming took place on location at RAF Bentwaters between April and May 2008.

== Release ==
The film was released theatrically in the United Kingdom by Left Films in October 2010.

Its home video released came on DVD in the UK in January 2012 with a US release following in May 2012. It had also been available in the US from March 2012 as an exclusive iTunes download.

== Critical reception ==
Stag Night of the Dead won the best feature award at the 2011 Newport International Film Festival.
