= Eugenio Calvarese =

Italian footballer (born 1992)

Personal information
- Full name: Eugenio Calvarese
- Date of birth: May 19, 1992 (age 34)
- Place of birth: Alba Adriatica, Italy
- Height: 1.80 m (5 ft 11 in)
- Position: Defender

Team information
- Current team: Alba Adriatica Calcio

Youth career
- 2005–2009: Ascoli
- 2009–2010: Alba Adriatica
- 2010–2011: Pescara

Senior career*
Years	Team	Apps	(Gls)
2011–2013	Pescara	0	(0)
2011–2012	→ Avellino (loan)	2	(0)
2012	→ L'Aquila (loan)	17	(0)
2012–2013	→ Paganese (loan)	21	(1)
2013–2016	Catanzaro	39	(0)
2017	Civitanovese	8	(0)
2017–	Alba Adriatica Calcio	?	(?)
- * Club domestic league appearances and goals as of 7 December 2017

Eugenio Calvarese (born 19 May 1992 in Alba Adriatica) is an Italian footballer who plays as a defender for ASD Alba Adriatica Calcio.
