= Jeff Rudom =

American basketball player and actor

- Born: July 30, 1960
- Died: October 19, 2011 (aged 51); Bangor, Maine, U.S.
- Occupations: Actor; basketball player

Jeffrey Zade Rudom (July 30, 1960 – October 19, 2011) was an American professional basketball player and actor who played in films such as Revolver and District 13. He regularly appeared in Time Gentlemen Please. He played professional basketball in Israel, where he served in the armed forces and lived for around 10 years. He was born in Bangor, Maine.

He stood 7 ft 1 in (216 cm) and weighed 455 pounds (206 kg) but dropped down to 363 pounds (165 kg) after his appearance on Celebrity Fit Club in 2006

Jeff died in his home in Bangor, Maine on Wednesday, October 19, 2011, age 51.

== Filmography ==
Year	Title	Role	Notes
2000	Gladiator	Gladiator	Uncredited
2005	District 13	Le yéti	
2005	Unleashed	Boxing Giant	
2005	The Honeymooners	Party Guest #4	
2005	Revolver	Fat Man	
2008	Made of Honor	Large Burly Scotsman	
2010	Bonded by Blood	Yank	
2010	Stag Night of the Dead	Mr. Ree	(final film role)
