= One Man and His Hob =

- A One Man and His Hob Titlecard
- Presented by: Aldo Zilli
- Country of origin: United Kingdom
- No. of episodes: 13

Production
- Running time: 30 minutes (inc. advertisements)
- Production company: Ginger Productions

Original release
- Network: Taste TV, STV (repeats)
- Release: 30 October 2001

One Man and His Hob was a British cookery show on the digital channel Taste TV. Celebrity chef Aldo Zilli traveled across the UK, preparing food on a single travel cooker. Using local ingredients and enlisting the help of passers-by, he cooked at outdoor venues around the country, taking inspiration from each location.

The programme was made by Ginger Productions, and was re-aired on Scottish television station STV, which owned Ginger Productions. The show never had a set introduction, rather a series of mini sketches, usually involving his cameraman "Angus" - with the show logo following soon after on the screen.
