= Time Gentlemen Please =

Television series

- Genre: Sitcom
- Written by: Richard Herring; Al Murray; Stewart Lee
- Directed by: Gareth Gwenlan; Richard Boden
- Starring: Al Murray; Phil Daniels; Jason Freeman; Rebecca Front; Roy Heather; Andrew Mackay; Julia Sawalha; Emma Pierson; Janine Buckley; Jeff Rudom; Marc Bannerman
- Country of origin: United Kingdom
- Original language: English
- No. of series: 2
- No. of episodes: 37

Production
- Camera setup: Multi-camera
- Running time: 30mins (inc. adverts)
- Production company: Avalon Television

Original release
- Network: Sky One
- Release: 11 September 2000 – 1 May 2002

Time Gentlemen Please is a British sitcom primarily written by Richard Herring and Al Murray and broadcast on Sky One from 2000 to 2002.

== Premise ==
The show is set in a forgotten, unwelcoming pub whose opinionated landlord, "Guv" (short for "The Governor"), has some very old-fashioned views on how a pub, and Britain, should be run. The Governor is an evolution of Al Murray's stage persona "The Pub Landlord", which he had used in stand up since 1994.

== Cast ==
- Al Murray as Guv
- Phil Daniels as Terry
- Jason Freeman as Steve
- Rebecca Front as Vicky Jackson
- Roy Heather as Old Man
- Andrew Mackay as Prof
- Julia Sawalha as Janet (Series 1)
- Emma Pierson as Connie (Series 2)
- Janine Buckley as Lesley
- Jeff Rudom as Leslie
- Marc Bannerman as Greg Thompson

== Characters ==
=== Bar staff ===
- Guv – The landlord of the pub. He sometimes claims to be the owner, but the pub is owned by the brewery and he is a tenant. Just prior to his divorce, his wife took their son and moved to France to be with her new lover, a French pub landlord. He has been involuntarily celibate since, and longs to see his son again. He has a number of politically incorrect views which he sometimes momentarily expresses, for example, the belief that women are only allowed to drink wine. He is a typical example of someone who has been emotionally neglected and shows signs that he has abandonment issues. He is very temperamental and neurotic to those around him. He idolises the man he imagines his father was, but it is often implied that Guv is the only one who doesn't know that his father isn't actually his father. He sometimes shows homosexual tendencies, despite being homophobic. In Series 2, he develops a mental condition that he calls "Barman's Hand", which makes him physically incapable of performing any bar related work whenever he tries. He also dreams of having a carvery in his pub, and to be inducted into the fabled 'Grand Order of Barstewards'. He greatly mourns the death of Princess Diana, which is the only common ground he has with his arch rival and nemesis Greg Thompson. Others are so used to calling him "Guv" (short for 'Governor') that they don't know his actual name, which he presumes to be a prank. Murray revealed years after the show ended that he and the character share the same name.
- Steve Crosby – Steve is the long term barman who lives in the pub cellar, sleeping on an old mattress between the beer barrels. During the first episode it is revealed that Steve has been working for the Guv for five years and still struggles to remember what the regulars drink and has no barman skills at all. His clumsiness is such that he has run up tens of thousands of pounds of debt by breaking glasses or damaging the pub, payable to the Guv via wage stoppages. Steve is not bothered by the amount he owes and is resigned to the fact whatever happens, goes wrong, or gets broken, he will be expected to pay for it, even on the occasions the damage was someone else's fault. He has no friends, other than the pub regulars, and is convinced that Mike the postman is his best mate. He also insists that he is a "temporary" barman until he figures out what he wants to do with his life, but has little motivation to find out what to do next; he becomes distressed when his job is under threat. He is a huge fan of the television show 'Fact Hunt' and its host 'Cheeky' Alan Supple along with Ken Tucky, the owner of a fast food chicken shop. He is offended when either personality is mimicked, but he enjoys imitating Cheeky's trademark 'hair lift'. He reads comics and most of his understanding of the modern world comes from Guv and 'That's Impossible' magazine, and is therefore wrong. He doesn't like Janet and is regularly annoyed by her continual sexual advances towards him, but has an unrequited love for Connie. He is verbally and physically abused by others, usually Guv, but he is loyal to his fellow bar staff. Steve enjoys responding to Ms. Jackson's welcoming calls of "hellooo".
- Janet Wilson – Janet is an Australian backpacker looking for a "temporary" job. As an Australian the Guv (and all the other Landlords) believe her bar skills are far superior to anyone else's as it is 'instinctive' for an Australian to undertake bar work – in fact he thinks it's all they are good for. Janet is desperate to earn enough money to return home, but Guv avoids paying her and this puts her in a Catch 22 as whether to wait and hope to be paid or just quit and cut her losses. She is foul-mouthed and talks almost constantly in sexual innuendo. She lusts after Steve, but has a relationship with a police surveillance operative after he was sent to investigate drug use in the pub. She hates the attention she gets from Greg Thompson and Mike. She always refers to the Guv as 'Bullet Head', due to his shaved, elongated, head. Janet detests Ms. Jackson, who she thinks is fake and uptight and this is exasperated by the fact that Jackson is deliberately rude to her. She makes constant jokes about her "last boyfriend", usually about his lack of personal hygiene. The boyfriend eventually comes looking for Janet and causes chaos in the pub. To escape him she quits at the end of Series 1 after he worms his way into the Guv's confidence.
- Connie – Connie is the barmaid that replaces Janet. At first, she is refused a job by Guv, so she works for Greg Thompson. She is taken on by Guv after she frees Steve from Greg's cellar and quits. She is constantly hit on by Greg who expresses his desire to marry her. She is a student who is seemingly knowledgeable in all subjects, consistently claiming that she studied it last term. She is prone to bouts of hormonal rage, and is consistently frustrated by all of the other regular characters as she tries to study for her next exam. She is also the only woman not fancied by Terry, but things come to a very unexpected conclusion in Terry's house. The Guv is obsessed with imagining her to be innocent and is in denial when he hears her swear or mentions anything lewd. It is revealed, much to the Guv's horror, that she used to be a lap dancer and a nude model.
- Gary – Gary is Guv's pet and the pub dog. In most episodes, it is revealed that Terry had been barred for doing something to Gary. As a result, Gary is usually seen in some outlandish costume.

=== The regulars ===
- Terry Brooks, the pub's regular alcoholic with an overactive (although rarely fulfilled) sex drive and a bad case of flatulence. Although this is never directly mentioned, he is clearly Guv's best friend. He is involved with several running gags. For example, in most episodes Terry manages to sneak back into the pub after being barred for various pranks on Gary (The pub's dog), Guv often refers to Terry as the "Master of Disguise" whenever he sneaks back into the pub with a rather obvious alter ego. He is often knocked out in fights with others, and has a sexual fetish towards birds. Upon meeting any woman for the first time (except Connie), Terry will always claim "that is the woman I'm going to marry". He has proposed to scores of women over his lifetime but has never actually married due to his chosen fiancée(s) not being aware of that Terry thinks they are engaged. Terry is also very much into self anal play and once ends up in A&E due to a misadventure with a number of potatoes (and a squeaky toy). He is also the first to volunteer tasting food or drink that appears disgusting, and later proclaims it to be "blinding", as he literally loses his vision.
- "Prof" (real name "Algernon McCoy"), a confirmed bachelor with an overbearing mother. He is known for his pseudo-intellectual comments and his skill on the pub's punningly named quiz machine (Fact Hunt). His nickname stems simply from the fact that he wears glasses and that he once won two pounds from the Fact Hunt game machine. The Prof leads a double life as both the "notorious railway station flasher" and a gay serial killer, both of which he refers to frequently, though the bar staff and regulars never seem to notice. It is suggested he killed an archaeologist working on a dig site in the pub's beer garden and buried him there, after his advances towards the man were rejected. It is also suggested that he is attracted to Guv, but he is just as often uninterested. The Prof hints at the fact that he really does have a massive 12 inch penis.
- "Pops" is a filthy old man with his regular table and strong Catholic beliefs, often wielding a large crucifix. He also claims to be immortal, but says it's more of a curse than a blessing. He is known for his catchphrase 'look at his face, it's a picture!', often after a joke has been played on someone. Little is known about him, but he states in the first episode that he preferred the situation to remain that way. He also blames many of the problems in his life on a faulty prophylactic, which led to the birth of his very troubled and animal hating/ killing son, Stan. He did not fight in World War 2 due to a bad foot, and is sick of people his age going on about what they did in the war. He has had a number of catastrophic car accidents that resulted in him losing his driving licence; he killed two German backpackers (much to the joy of the Guv), his wife died when he crashed into a lorry carrying party poppers, and he destroyed a Brownies campsite.
- Leslie is a huge (over 7 feet according to the Guv) biker type who sits in the corner, with his comparatively diminutive girlfriend Lesley. He almost never speaks but will growl at those who upset him and can only be calmed by an offer of free crisps. Both he and Lesley believe that their drinks are magical and that their glasses never empty; this is due to the Guv's complex mechanical contraption to keep their drinks topped up, suggesting they have never once paid for their drinks. This is done to placate Leslie and avoid confrontation. He never harms anyone without permission from Lesley (which he usually receives). He is normally content to sit quietly and watch the events in the bar. On a few occasions, he does show an attachment to Terry. On occasion, Leslie can be seen eavesdropping on the events that happen around the bar. In one episode he temporarily abandoned Lesley in order to pursue Connie who he would call "pretty" and wanted to marry.
- Lesley, is Leslie's girlfriend. She is content to sit quietly with Leslie and her Tigger toy, which both of them cherish highly and are extremely protective of. She is only slightly more talkative than Leslie, but she is far more sensitive. She enjoys watching Leslie hurt people, while drinking white wine. At one point she is seduced by Terry and falls for him. She is initially upset when he dumps her, but she quickly realises that the only man for her is Leslie. It is revealed that she and Lesley had their first sexual encounter in the pub car park.

=== Other main characters ===
- Ms. Vickie Jackson – "Ms" Jackson is the new brewery representative, and the daughter of the brewery owner. She is often looking for ways to increase the number of customers in the pub, always at Guv's disapproval. She is extremely eccentric, acting in a bizarre, overly friendly manner. She also makes a lot of references to '90's pop culture, even though she is the only person who gets the references most times. At times she feels a kinship towards the barmaids despite their obvious contempt for her due to her belittling comments. Guv refers to her as "Bloody Ms. Jackson – cow" so often that it becomes a subconscious reflex. At the end of the first series, she has a son to Uncle Barry. She has an identical sister who is a psychiatrist and appears in only one episode and is never mentioned at any other time. She is obviously attracted to Greg Thompson but does not seem to understand his flirting isn't sincere.
- "Uncle" Barry, a recovering sexaholic with black hair dye that never dries who is actually, and secretly, the Guv's real father. He later fathers a baby with Ms. Jackson after a drunken promotional night across the pub chain. He has a habit of risking his own reputation to help Guv as he feels he has let his "nephew" (son) down. He absolutely detests Greg Thompson and is often vocal about the fact. Barry runs 'The Swan' public house and frequents the Guv's pub, along with Mike and Dave, on several occasions. He also looks after the bar when the Guv has something else on.
- Greg Thompson, currently holds the title of "King Barsteward". He is also the Landlord for the nearby 'Queen of Hearts' pub (formerly the 'Cock and Beaver' – the name was changed in memory of Princess Diana, but he thinks the public have now lost interest in her and is planning to rename the pub again once one of the Spice Girls dies). He is a charming ladies' man, often seen with a lady on each arm, who is violent towards men. He is also shown as a stereotypical bully by preying on the weak but cowering before those that stand up to him. He often uses double entendres to imply he has a large penis, and then immediately informs the listener outright that he was implying it. This leads to women who know him assuming that innocent phrases were meant as innuendos. He then explains that he meant the phrase literally but then acts as they had expected. adding an intentional innuendo and making eventually assuming innocent phrases were intentional innuendoes, which leads to him explaining he meant the phrase literally before behaving as accused. He is fond of snakes and keeps a python. Greg graduated from Landlord Academy with the Guv, whom he calls "Slops" after the latter was caught drinking from a slops tray in the dorm. Greg regards his family as very important; in fact there is "nothing more important than family". This dedication only lasts so long as it does not drag Greg into any difficult or confrontational encounters. On one occasion it is revealed that Greg has a son but he resents that fact he has to see him once every four weeks and he is not even sure of his name. He is overprotective of the boy after a confrontation with the Guv, but becomes instantly irritated by having to look after him. Greg is very fond of his nephew Kas (who is called Ashley or Gary by some sources) and once again he shows his overprotective nature towards a family member. That is until Kas is arrested for criminal damage, where up on Greg denies all knowledge of him.

Other Significant Characters:

- Mike and Dave, a pair of landlords who are always seen together. Mike is somewhat of a fool who is always embarrassing Dave. They are also two of the leading members of the Grand Order of Barstewards (with Ms. Jackson, Barry and Greg). They sometimes behave like a couple despite not being in that kind of relationship.
- Mike the "Postie" – Mike (played by co-author, Richard Herring) is a postman who is known in the pub simply as 'Postie'. He hates Steve, even though Steve thinks they are friends. He fancies Janet, but Janet is turned off by his attitude towards Steve. He is also very sensitive about the shape of his face, because Janet (from whom he seeks approval) always calls him "bean-face".
- "Fat" Tony 'Arris (aka Moon Man) – Tony is an obese former brewery representative and gave his life and soul to the brewery; he was absolutely distraught at losing his job. He and the Guv had a fairly good working relationship, but the Guv only remained friends with him in the hope that Tony could use his position as a brewery rep to fulfil the Guv's dream of owning a carvery. He was also the King Barsteward before he was replaced, by Ms. Jackson, due to health issues. He is typically drunk or otherwise unconscious when he is shown on screen.
- Mr. Jackson – Ms. Jackson's father and the owner of the brewery. He is only seen in two episodes, but his presence has a constant effect on Guv, Steve and Ms. Jackson. He expresses himself as a powerful man and he does not tolerate anyone that does not bow to his every whim. He delights in explaining his unique, and prohibitively expensive, multistage method of exacting his vengeance. His favourite meal is rat sandwiches which he claims reminds him of his youth
- Prof's Mother – Prof's Mother is an unnamed character who acts as a refined, overly religious lady in front of her son, often condemning him for being in the pub. But when Prof is not nearby, she drops her self-righteous facade and is found to be a foul-mouthed harridan.
- Guv's Mother – Guv's Mother was an abusive parent who frequently cheated on her husband. She resents Guv for being born when he was. One episode reveals that she has had a fling with Barry, Terry and the Prof (despite him being covertly gay) at one time or other. She is normally seen in memory sequences, although she does visit the pub on one occasion, where it becomes apparent that the Guv's memories of her are actually very accurate to her true personality.

== Locations ==
The exterior shots of the pub were filmed at The Cowshed public house (formerly The Admiral Blake), at the corner of Barlby Rd and Ladbroke Grove, London W10, since demolished and rebuilt as a residential block circa 2013. The name The Cowshed is referred to in Series 2 Episode 3, where the Guv orders a new sign to be made saying the "Cow's Head", after "Ms Jackson, Cow", but he misspells the name. But he also adds a hand-painted sign of a cow with Miss Jackson's face. The pub is always referred to as the "pub by the chemical works", and its actual name is never referenced in any other episode.

== Episodes ==
=== Series 1 (2000–2001) ===
| No. in series | Title | Directed by | Written by | Original release date |
|---|---|---|---|---|
| 1 | "A Woman's Place" | Gareth Gwenlan | Richard Herring & Al Murray | 11 September 2000 |
An Australian turns up at the pub just as the Guv sacks his barman, Steve. There's also a shock as the brewery sacks its long-standing local regional rep.
| 2 | "Never Confused" | Gareth Gwenlan | Richard Herring & Al Murray | 18 September 2000 |
The brewery dictates that all of its pubs should hold a gay night – needless to say, the Guv is not best pleased.
| 3 | "Hoppy Birthday" | Gareth Gwenlan | Richard Herring & Al Murray | 25 September 2000 |
It's Terry's birthday, and the Guv's lined him up the traditional pint-per-year to celebrate.
| 4 | "Monkey's Uncle" | Gareth Gwenlan | Richard Herring & Al Murray | 2 October 2000 |
The pub is trashed by a local hooligan – unfortunately, he happens to be the nephew of rival landlord and womanising bully Greg Thompson.
| 5 | "King Barsteward" | Gareth Gwenlan | Richard Herring & Al Murray | 9 October 2000 |
Guv receives notification that he has been nominated to join the Grand Order of the Barstewards.
| 6 | "Date With Density" | Richard Boden | Richard Herring & Al Murray | 16 October 2000 |
It's been a year – but the Guv finally has a date. And as the owner of his own pub, he's already got the perfect evening planned.
| 7 | "Getting Diggy With It" | Richard Boden | Richard Herring & Al Murray | 23 October 2000 |
The Guv's reluctantly having his beer garden turned into a car park, but work is stopped when human remains are discovered during the excavations.
| 8 | "The Pub That Forgot Time" | Richard Boden | Richard Herring & Al Murray | 30 October 2000 |
Steve has fallen in love with French archaeologist Sue, but Janet won't let her man go without a fight. Meanwhile, head archaeologist Mike believes that there's a great business opportunity at the site.
| 9 | "Fawkes/Off" | Richard Boden | Richard Herring & Al Murray | 6 November 2000 |
It's Guy Fawkes' night, also the birthday of little Carl, and the Guv's taking it particularly badly. Meanwhile, a new Guy Fawkes celebratory drink is causing havoc at Thackeray pubs.
| 10 | "Help! The Aged" | Gareth Gwenlan | Richard Herring & Al Murray | 13 November 2000 |
The Guv's new novelty sign promising free drinks for over-80s (when accompanied by both parents) backfires following a disagreement with the Old Man.
| 11 | "More Tea Vicky?" | Richard Boden | Richard Herring & Al Murray | 20 November 2000 |
Vicky makes a surprise visit to inspect the Guv'nor's books. Meanwhile, Terry's gone AWOL and Steve's sold the time bell for a bag of magic mushrooms.
| 12 | "Day of the Trivheads" | Richard Boden | Richard Herring & Al Murray | 27 November 2000 |
The pub's selected to field a team for cult TV pub quiz show Fact Hunt; unfortunately, the first round will be against Greg Thompson's gaff, the Queen of Hearts.
| 13 | "Greetings Stout Yeoman" | Gareth Gwenlan | Richard Herring & Al Murray | 4 December 2000 |
Much to the Guv's disgust, the pub is selected as the first venue outside of the Irish Republic to trial a new stout, Rileys, which professes to be stout, lager and ale in one.
| 14 | "Only When I Laugh" | Richard Boden | Richard Herring & Al Murray | 11 December 2000 |
The Guv visits Tony Harris in hospital, and bumps into Terry, Vicky, Tina and Sinjun whilst there. The future looks bleak for both Tony and Vicky, but a surprise could be around the corner.
| 15 | "Playing Silly Buggers" | Richard Boden | Richard Herring & Al Murray | 18 December 2000 |
Guv and the regulars are oblivious when a drug dealer makes a new dealing base out of the pub. But the Irish criminal is under police surveillance.
| 16 | "Bar Humbug" | Richard Boden | Richard Herring & Al Murray | 25 December 2000 |
It's Christmas Day, and a fire at the home means that the Guv's mum has to come and visit. He's determined that this'll be one Christmas she won't ruin.
| 17 | "New Year's Steve" | Richard Boden | Richard Herring & Al Murray | 1 January 2001 |
It's New Year's Eve, and with Greg's special guest of 'Cheeky' Alan Supple at the Queen of Hearts, only Janet and the Guv are left.
| 18 | "The Return of Martin Greer" | Richard Boden | Richard Herring, Al Murray & Stewart Lee | 8 January 2001 |
The Guv and his band of dysfunctional regulars and staff continue with their unique brand of philosophy.
| 19 | "Juke Box Fury" | Richard Boden | Richard Herring & Al Murray | 15 January 2001 |
When Miss Jackson bursts into tears after a disagreement with the Guv over jazz music on a new jukebox, Janet suspects something's up. Sure enough, there's a secret to rock the pub with no name.
| 20 | "Farts of Darkness" | Richard Boden | Richard Herring & Al Murray | 22 January 2001 |
It's 3am, and with torrential rain pouring down, the Guv is woken by Terry at the front door. What could he possibly want at this hour?
| 21 | "A Dave, A Dave-O" | Richard Boden | Richard Herring, Al Murray & Stewart Lee | 29 January 2001 |
Leslie's in court, and Terry takes his opportunity with Lesley. Meanwhile, a particularly annoying arrival at the pub turns out to be none other than Janet's infamous "last boyfriend", Dave.
| 22 | "All The World's A Stag" | Richard Boden | Richard Herring, Al Murray & Stewart Lee | 5 February 2001 |
As Terry's wedding to Miss Jackson approaches, Vicky's desperate to find a way out – but the minder assigned by her father is there to ensure everything goes ahead. Meanwhile, Dave refuses to leave, and Janet's getting desperate.

=== Series 2 (2001–2002) ===
| No. in series | Title | Directed by | Written by | Original release date |
|---|---|---|---|---|
| 1 | "Christmas Special: It's A Wonderful Pint" | Richard Boden | Richard Herring & Al Murray | 24 December 2001 |
It's 10 months since the Guv retreated to his bedroom, and Terry, the Old Man and the Prof have had enough of Dave's Australian-ness. It's time to call in the big guns.
| 2 | "The Man in the Iron Cask" | Richard Boden | Richard Herring & Al Murray | 30 January 2002 |
The Guv's back in the saddle, but crippled by a double case of Barman's Hand. Steve's still missing, and an applicant for Janet's old job turns out to be a student. Will salvation come?
| 3 | "Got the Painters In" | Richard Boden | Richard Herring & Al Murray | 6 February 2002 |
As the brewery pays for the pub's refurbishment, Vicky has an embarrassing secret to admit: she doesn't know the pub's real name. Trouble is, neither does anyone else.
| 4 | "Wishing On A Bar" | Richard Boden | Richard Herring & Al Murray | 13 February 2002 |
As the decorators move inside, the Guv finds himself locked in a battle of wits with an evil Leprechaun.
| 5 | "The Harder They Crawl" | Richard Boden | Richard Herring & Al Murray | 20 February 2002 |
The Guv's not feeling himself after his divorce came through, but it's Tony Harris's birthday so he and Terry have duties to attend to.
| 6 | "Landlord of the Giants" | Richard Boden | Richard Herring & Al Murray | 27 February 2002 |
When Leslie falls under Connie's spell, Lesley brings a new man to the pub. Could this lead to the downfall of The Cowshed? Meanwhile, the Prof claims to have invented the never-ending beer glass.
| 7 | "Beer Necessities" | Richard Boden | Richard Herring, Al Murray & Stewart Lee | 6 March 2002 |
Connie is thrown into a moral quandary; torn between her job and 'friends', her objection to pornography, and her residual feelings toward ex-boyfriend Dean, when instructed by nasty brewery owner Mr Jackson to take part in a topless calendar shoot.
| 8 | "Game for a Gaff" | Richard Boden | Richard Herring, Al Murray, Rob Adey & Richard Murkin | 13 March 2002 |
As the pub faces the latest whim of Vicky's father, the Guv's hopes of finally getting his dream of a carvery could be realised. Will they be dashed once more, or will a long-dead German come up trumps?
| 9 | "Speed the Ploughmans" | Richard Boden | Richard Herring & Al Murray | 20 March 2002 |
Connie's stressed over a philosophy exam that will total 0.3% of her degree, and the Guv's received a disturbing letter – Terry, however, is concerned only with his ploughman's.
| 10 | "Optics Wide Shut" | Richard Boden | Richard Herring, Al Murray & Stewart Lee | 27 March 2002 |
Uninvited to the Barstewards' Annual Secret Ball, the Guv sets out to sneak in. Could the promised sex orgy and night of abandoned morals break his duck?
| 11 | "Storming Up A Cook" | Richard Boden | Richard Herring & Al Murray | 3 April 2002 |
Despite the Guv's protests, Vicky hires a local celebrity chef, the Bare-Arsed Naked Cook. As she and Connie fight for his affections, the Guv continues to insist on his dismissal.
| 12 | "Of Mice and Mentallists" | Richard Boden | Richard Herring & Al Murray | 10 April 2002 |
Barman's Hand takes the ultimate toll on the Guv'nor, and he collapses, setting fire to the kitchen in the process. Although quickly saved by the regulars, he's tormented by visions of giant mice, and when Vicky finds out his terrible shame, he's encouraged to visit a psychiatrist.
| 13 | "The Slopranos" | Richard Boden | Richard Herring & Al Murray | 17 April 2002 |
Visiting the psychiatrist, Vicky's twin sister, the Guv is forced to confront his demons. Does he want to shag his mother? Is there a mystery about his father? Is he actually confused? And most importantly, is he nuts?
| 14 | "This Vale of Beers" | Richard Boden | Richard Herring, Al Murray & Stewart Lee | 24 April 2002 |
The Guv's initially ecstatic, as the function room is – for once – booked. Unfortunately, it soon turns out that Greg Thompson is the patron, having found God and turned the Queen of Hearts into a coffee house.
| 15 | "Entente Lime Cordial" | Richard Boden | Richard Herring & Al Murray | 1 May 2002 |
The Guv's reached the end of his tether. His wife's just got remarried – to a Frenchman – and now Vicky demands he closes down for the last time if his Barman's Hand continues. Could a visitor "from overseas" change his fortunes? Has little Carl returned to his Daddy? What will become of The Cowshed?

== After the show ==
After the series came to a close, Al Murray has since suggested that his character Guv's real name was also Al Murray. This allows him to use the 'Pub Landlord' character for his stand-up performances. Most of Al Murray's appearances are either as the 'Pub Landlord', or as an alternative version of himself, usually a slightly more reserved version of the 'Pub Landlord' character.

In multiple episodes of the series, Guv directly repeats direct lines from Al Murray's stand-up shows. In the Christmas Special, Guv repeats the 'When a child is born' routine from one of Murray's tours.

ITV later commissioned a game show called 'Fact Hunt'. The show was based on the fictional quiz show mentioned repeatedly throughout 'Time Gentlemen Please'. But instead of being hosted by the character "Cheeky" Alan Supple, it was hosted by the Pub Landlord. Each episode was based on a traditional pub quiz and featured contestants representing different pubs across South England. The first and only series was cancelled after only a few episodes due to low viewership.

ITV would later commission 'Al Murray's Happy Hour', which again was hosted by Murray in his Pub Landlord character. It was a chat show that was frequently compared to The Graham Norton Show on BBC1. While most guests appeared on the show to publicise something, they rarely got a chance to. Murray would get them to mention the thing once, and then he would mock it as a money-making endeavour, and then he would move on.

Murray would later host his own concept for a game show on Dave. Murray would once again use his Pub Landlord character, but would still use his real name. The show was compared to a higher budget version of Fact Hunt. There has only been one series. There are no plans to make future episodes.

== Distribution ==
After the show was aired on Sky One it was repeated on Paramount Comedy as it was formerly known. In 2011, Comedy Central Extra bought the rights to repeat some of the first series in a late night slot but have since never repeated the series again. Time Gentlemen Please was released onto DVD first in 2006 by Universal entitled Series 1 Part 1 which included the first six episodes of the first series, it was released on 8 May 2006. After Universal showed no plans to release any further episodes of the series onto DVD, ITV DVD later released a complete collection of the series featuring all 37 episodes on 16 March 2009.

In February 2020, Al Murray started releasing one episode of Time Gentlemen Please per week on his official YouTube channel. All episodes have now been uploaded and are available to view.

As of Jan 2024, Time Gentlemen Please can also be found on the Roku streaming channel.
