= Cornwerdermolen =

Smock mill in Friesland, Netherlands

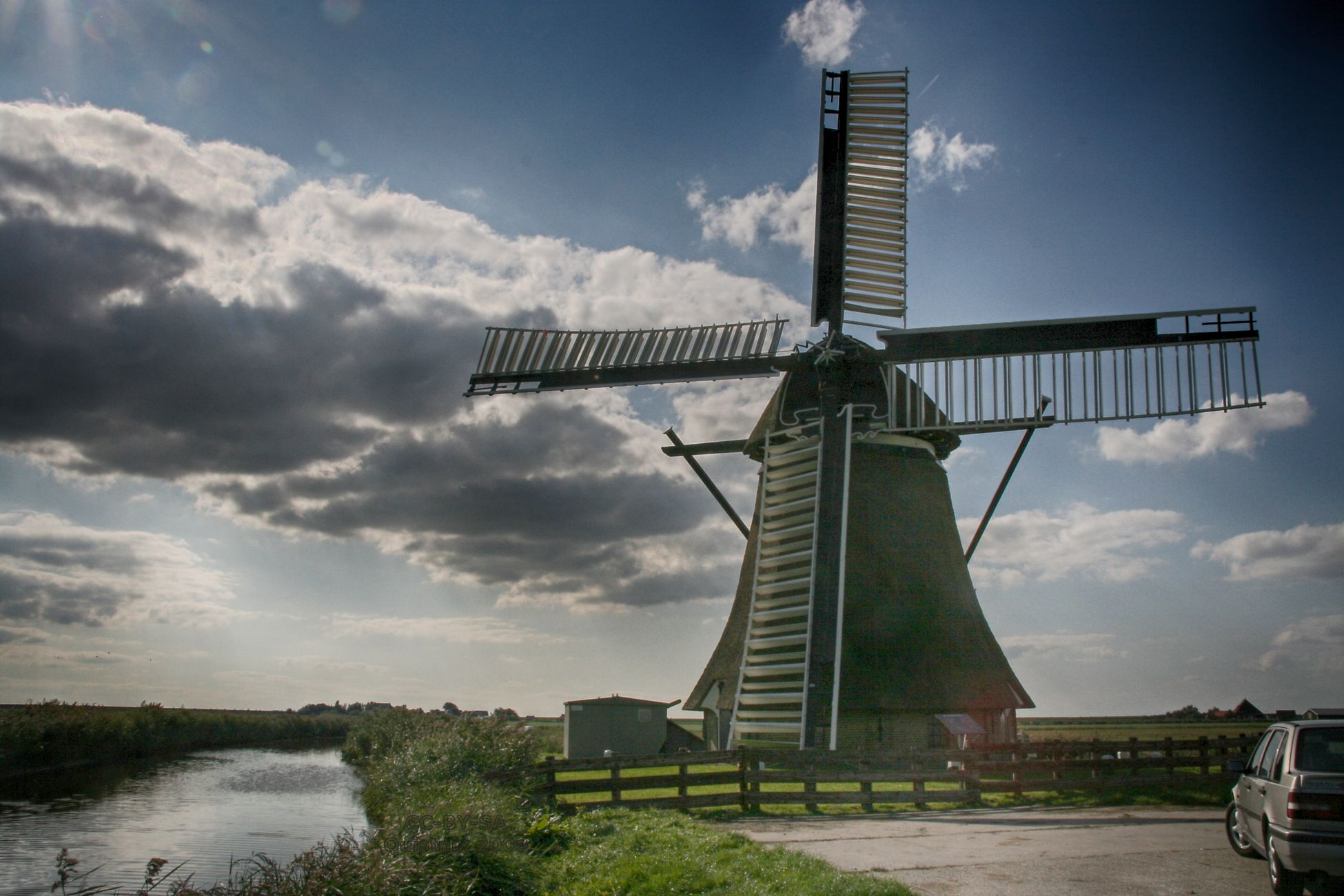
- De Cornwerdermolen, September 2008

Origin
- Mill name: De Cornwerdermolen
- Mill location: Sotterruimerdijk 13, 8753 JA Cornwerd, Netherlands
- Coordinates: 53°04′46″N 5°24′06″E
- Operator(s): Wetterskip Fryslân
- Year built: 1907

Information
- Purpose: Drainage mill
- Type: Smock mill
- Storeys: Three-storey smock
- Base storeys: One-storey base
- Smock sides: Eight sides
- No. of sails: Four sails
- Type of sails: Patent sails
- Windshaft: Cast iron
- Winding: Tailpole and winch
- Type of pump: Archimedes' screw

The Cornwerdermolen is a smock mill in Cornwerd, Friesland, Netherlands, which has been restored to working order. The mill is listed as Rijksmonument number 39329.

== History ==
The Cornwerdermolen was built in 1907 by millwright J H Westra of Franeker. The mill originally drained two polders, each via a separate Archimedes' screw. Five windmills were put out of work by the construction of the Cornwerdermolen and were demolished. The smaller of the two screws was later removed. The mill was restored in 1969. it worked until 13 November 1972, when it lost two sails in a storm. Thereafter the work of the mill was done by an Archimedes' screw driven by a tractor. The tractor was later replaced by an electric motor. The mill was restored in 1999. It is the most westerly windmill in Friesland.

== Description ==
The Cornwerdermolen is a three-storey smock mill on a single-storey base. There is no stage, the sails reaching almost to the ground. The mill is winded by tailpole and winch. The four Patent sails, which have a span of 20.00 metres (65 ft 7 in), are carried in a cast-iron windshaft which was cast by H J Koning, Foxham, Groningen in 1907. The mill in winded by a tailpole and winch. The windshaft also carries the brake wheel which has 59 cogs. This drives the wallower (34 cogs) at the top of the upright shaft. At the bottom of the upright shaft, the crown wheel (103 cogs) drives the Archimedes' screw via a gearwheel with 37 cogs. The axle of the Archimedes' screw is 715 millimetres (2 ft 4 in) diameter and the Archimedes' screw is 1.52 metres (5 ft 0 in) diameter. It is 4.63 metres (15 ft 2 in) long, inclined at 19½°. Each turn of the screw lifts 1,147 litres (252 imp gal) of water.

== Public access ==
The Cornwerdermolen is open to the public by appointment.
