= Tina Baker =

British journalist (born 1958)

Tina Baker (born 4 May 1958 in Coalville, Leicestershire, England) is a British author, broadcaster, journalist, and fitness professional. She has published 4 novels, including the Amazon Number 1 bestseller, Call Me Mummy. Her other thrillers with publisher Viper Books are What We Did in the Storm, Nasty Little Cuts, and Make Me Clean.

Baker started her television career as a presenter/reporter on TV-am in the 1980s, worked as a TV critic for GMTV, appeared on many programmes as a pundit, including Big Brother's Big Mouth, and various list shows like The Top 100 TV Christmas Crackers, presented slots on BBC's Daytime Live, and was a judge for The British Soap Awards.

She also won ITV1's reality TV show, Celebrity Fit Club, then qualified as a motivational fitness coach. She still works as a personal trainer and fitness instructor.

Baker has written for magazines TV Times, Soaplife, Woman's Own and Womans Realm, newspapers including The Sun, The Mirror, and The Mail, and has been a regular broadcaster on numerous radio stations, including BBC Radio Five Live, Radio 2, The Asian Network and many regional stations.

The daughter of a window cleaner and fairground worker, she now lives in north London, is married, and has four rescue cats.
