= Celebrity Fit Club =

- Presented by: Dale Winton (2004–2006)
- Narrated by: Jenny Eclair (2002); Veronika Hyks (2004–2006)
- Country of origin: United Kingdom
- Original language: English
- No. of series: 4
- No. of episodes: 37

Production
- Running time: 30 minutes (inc. adverts: 2002); 60 minutes (inc. adverts: 2004–2006)
- Production companies: LWT (2002–2004); Granada (2005); ITV Productions (2006)

Original release
- Network: ITV
- Release: 27 September 2002 – 11 April 2006

Celebrity Fit Club is a reality television series that follows eight overweight celebrities as they try to lose weight for charity. Split into two competing teams of four, each week teams are given different physical challenges, and weighed to see if they reached their target weights. They are monitored and supervised by a team that includes a nutritionist, a psychologist, and a physical trainer, the latter of which is former U.S. Marine Harvey Walden IV. The series originated in the United Kingdom on ITV in 2002 as Fat Club, with members of the general public taking part. The show then switched to celebrity participants, and continued until 2006, with Dale Winton as host since the series two.

An American version premiered in 2005 on the VH1 network, which aired until 2010 for a total of seven seasons.

== Series one – 2002 ==
The first series aired in 2002 and featured the following celebrities:

- Jonathan "Jono" Coleman (radio DJ)
- Nicola Duffett (actress – Family Affairs)
- Ian McCaskill (weatherman)
- Coleen Nolan (singer and presenter)
- Kay Purcell (actress – played Cynthia Daggert in Emmerdale)
- Rik Waller (former contestant – Pop Idol) (the first celebrity to leave the show)
- Tommy Walsh (celebrity builder – Ground Force)
- Ann Widdecombe (Conservative MP)

Note: Series One was the only series in which celebs were not competing in teams or the episodes were filmed around the weigh-in; instead the weigh in occurred near the end. There was also no host as such, although comedian Jenny Eclair provided a voiceover with the filmed advice of nutritionists Dr Adam Carey and Matt Lovell throughout the series.

== Series two – 2004 ==
The second series was aired in 2004 presented by Dale Winton. Hypnotherapist Marisa Peer joined the panel. The following celebrities took part:

Vanessa's Team (winners)

- Vanessa Feltz (team captain) (presenter)
- Lowri Turner (presenter)
- Jonathan "Jono" Coleman (radio DJ)
- Amy Lamé (comedian and radio DJ)

James's Team (see note)

- Freddie Starr (original team captain until 3rd weigh-in, after which he was demoted for not taking the exercise regime sufficiently seriously) (comedian)
- John Forgeham (2nd team captain from 4th to 6th weigh-in) (actor – Footballer's Wives)
- James Whitaker (Final team captain) (royal correspondent) (Mr Fit Club 2004)
- Alison Hammond (former Big Brother contestant, and television presenter)

Note: James' Team was known as John's team from weigh-ins 4 to 6 and Freddie's team from weigh-ins 1 to 3.

Jono Coleman took part for the second series in a row.

== Series three – 2005 ==
The third series started on 4 January 2005, this with a former contestant, Ann Widdecombe as a member of the judging panel. The celebrities that took part were;

Aldo's Team (lost 13.2% of their starting weight) (lost 7 stone 9 pounds (107 lb; 49 kg), together)

- Aldo Zilli (team captain) (celebrity chef) – lost 2 stone 6 pounds (34 lb; 15 kg)
- Julie Goodyear (Original team captain quit role at weigh-in 6) (actress – played Bet Lynch in Coronation Street) – lost 1 stone 10 pounds (24 lb; 11 kg)
- Ken Morley (actor – played Reg Holdsworth in Coronation Street) – lost 1 stone 12 pounds (26 lb; 12 kg)
- Lizzy Bardsley (former Wife Swap contestant) – lost 1 stone 9 pounds (23 lb; 10 kg)

Note: Team known as Julie's team from weigh-in 1 to 6.

Paul's Team (lost 12.3% of their starting weight) (lost 9 stone 4 pounds (130 lb; 59 kg), together)

- Paul Ross (team captain) (presenter and brother of Jonathan Ross) – lost 2 stone 1 pound (29 lb; 13 kg)
- Andy Fordham (darts world champion) – lost 3 stone 0 pounds (42 lb; 19 kg)
- Kym Mazelle (singer) – lost 1 stone 10 pounds (24 lb; 11 kg)
- Tina Baker (soap opera critic) – lost 2 stone 7 pounds (35 lb; 16 kg) (Miss Fit Club 2005)
- Julie Goodyear decided that she no longer wanted the responsibility of the role of captain, so Aldo Zilli was appointed captain in Julie's place.
- Andy Fordham, who weighed 30 stone 8 pounds (428 lb; 194 kg) at the beginning of the series and suffered from various long-term health issues, was struggling to walk more than a hundred metres before almost collapsing, but with help from drill instructor Harvey, Andy was eventually able to run short distances.
- Aldo's team (formerly Julie's) won the series by a very small margin in the end, with a mere 0.4% greater loss than Paul's team.

== Series four – 2006 ==
The fourth British series began on 10 January 2006. In this series, former Fit Club contestants joined the judging panel, with a different ex-contestant appearing each week: so far, they have included Amy Lamé, Aldo Zilli, Jonathan "Jono" Coleman, Paul Ross, Alison Hammond, James Whitaker, Lowri Turner, Ann Widdecombe and Kym Mazelle. Also, this year the final episode is a 90-minute mini-Olympic event in Sheffield, where Channel 4's The Games takes place, with past celebrities joining the two teams. The celebrities taking part are:

Jeff's Team (lost 18% of their starting weight) (lost 12 stone 13 pounds (181 lb; 82 kg), together without Anne's weight)

- Jeff Rudom (team captain) (actor and ex-professional basketball player) – lost 6 stone 8 pounds (92 lb; 42 kg)
- Mikyla Dodd (actress, formerly on Hollyoaks) – lost 3 stone 2 pounds (44 lb; 20 kg)
- Russell Grant (astrologer, television presenter, author) – lost 3 stone 3 pounds (45 lb; 20 kg)
- Anne Diamond (Original team captain demoted for walking off) (presenter) – lost 1 stone 2 pounds (16 lb; 7.3 kg), left programme before the 7th episode)

Note: Jeff's team was originally known as Anne's team for the first 4 weigh-ins of the series.

Carole's Team (winners) (lost 19% of their starting weight) (lost 12 stone 6 pounds (174 lb; 79 kg), together)

- Carole Malone (team captain) (journalist) – lost 3 stone 0 pounds (42 lb; 19 kg)
- Bobby George (darts player) – lost 2 stone 13 pounds (41 lb; 19 kg)
- Sharon Marshall (television expert – This Morning) – lost 1 stone 13 pounds (27 lb; 12 kg)
- Mick Quinn (former football player) – lost 4 stone 8 pounds (64 lb; 29 kg), Mr Fit Club 2006)

The panel for this episode saw USA drill instructor Harvey Walden again joined by nutritionist Dr Adam Carey. Each week Harvey and Adam were joined by Fit Club past masters. The first show saw the return of Amy Lamé.

Starting Point:

Anne Diamond who at 14 st 9 lb (205 lb; 93 kg) is 4 stone 5 pounds (61 lb; 28 kg) overweight and suffered from high blood pressure, admits to a classic cycle of yo-yo dieting.

Carole Malone, starting at 15 st 10 lb (220 lb; 100 kg), is only 2 pounds (0.91 kg) off being medically morbidly obese.

Mikyla Dodd, at 19 st 2 lb (268 lb; 122 kg) is medically morbidly obese and has a goal weight of 12 stone (170 lb; 76 kg).

Bobby George, 16 st 13 lb (237 lb; 108 kg) admits to having two fridges in his bedroom which he raids every night for chocolate.

Russell Grant, severely morbidly obese at 21 st 11 lb (305 lb; 138 kg), admits that from 10:30am to 9pm daily he is constantly snacking, regardless of whether he is hungry or not.

Sharon Marshall, 13 st 4 lb (186 lb; 84 kg) admits to a 'booze' problem and a lifestyle of parties which is not helping her weight loss.

Mick Quinn, once at the peak of physical fitness as a professional footballer, has, since retiring from sport, ballooned to 19 st 6 lb (272 lb; 123 kg), making him medically morbidly obese. He admits he enjoys being a couch potato and is "much too fond of crisps and beer". He said "I am just like Homer Simpson in real life - I love slobbing out in front of the TV with a drink and some snacks. That's a perfect life for me. I did all my hard running around ten years ago."

Jeff Rudom, former professional basketball player, was 7 ft 1 in (216 cm) tall and weighed in at 32 st 7 lb (455 lb; 206 kg), making him the tallest and heaviest celebrity ever to appear on the show.

=== The Anne Diamond Saga ===
Anne Diamond, who was team captain, walked off during a training session in week 4. The UK soldiers who replaced Harvey failed to gel with Anne Diamond, who said "I'm not going to have a stupid, spotty, pubescent little youth yelling at me!” As a result of her outburst in training, Anne was relieved of her captaincy by Harvey. The following week, she was angry that Jeff was made team captain instead of Mikyla.

The following week, Anne Diamond revealed that she had a gastric band fitted. This garnered much press attention, making the front pages of the Daily Mail, Express and Mirror. Fellow contestant Carole Malone branded Anne "a cheat", and she was subsequently banned from the team weigh by the other celebrities. Later Carole and her team decided to include her in all aspects of the programme regardless of previous disputes, but she chose to leave the show.

=== The Sheffield Events 2006 and the Final Weigh-in ===
The English Institute for Sport in Sheffield was the venue for the series' final competition, and the two teams fought head to head for the inaugural Fit Club Champions Trophy, with Aldo, Amy, Coleen and Harvey joining Jeff's team, and Tina, Kym and Lowri joining Carole's team. After the long jump, sprint, shot put and hurdles, the fate of each team rested on the relay race. It was a fast and furious race but Mick emerged victor, making Carole Malone's team the winners.

At the weigh-in, Dale dealt some bad news: as he approached the finish, Mick had thrown the baton before he had crossed the line, thus disqualifying him from the race, and giving the win to the opposing team. Captain Jeff decided that in the interest of competition both teams should share the trophy. Later Mick was made Mr Fit Club 2006, with a reduction of nearly 25%.

The teams took to the giant scales and with a 19% reduction of their total weight Carole's team won the series, just putting them ahead of Jeff's 18% team effort. The overall result could barely have been closer.

== Weight losses ==
The following celebrities have lost the largest amounts of weight in the course of a single week:

- Paul Ross – 10 pounds (4.5 kg)
- Andy Fordham – 10 pounds (4.5 kg)
- Aldo Zilli – 11 pounds (5.0 kg)
- Jono Coleman – 12 pounds (5.4 kg)
- Micky Quinn – 1 stone 1 pound (15 pounds (6.8 kg))
- Rik Waller – 1 stone (14 pounds (6.4 kg))
- Jeff Rudom – 1 stone 9 pounds (23 pounds (10 kg)) (largest ever loss)

The smallest weight loss ever was Andy Fordham with 0.5 pounds (0.23 kg).

The largest individual weight loss across a whole series to date is Jeff Rudom with 6 st 8 lb (92 lb; 42 kg).

== Weight gains ==
The following celebrities have gained weight between successive weigh-ins:

- John Forgeham – 2 pounds (0.91 kg)
- Freddie Starr – 2 pounds (0.91 kg)
- Kym Mazelle – 1 pound (0.45 kg)
- Paul Ross – 4 pounds (1.8 kg) (largest ever gain)
- Aldo Zilli – 1 pound (0.45 kg)
