= Saclà =

Italian multinational food company

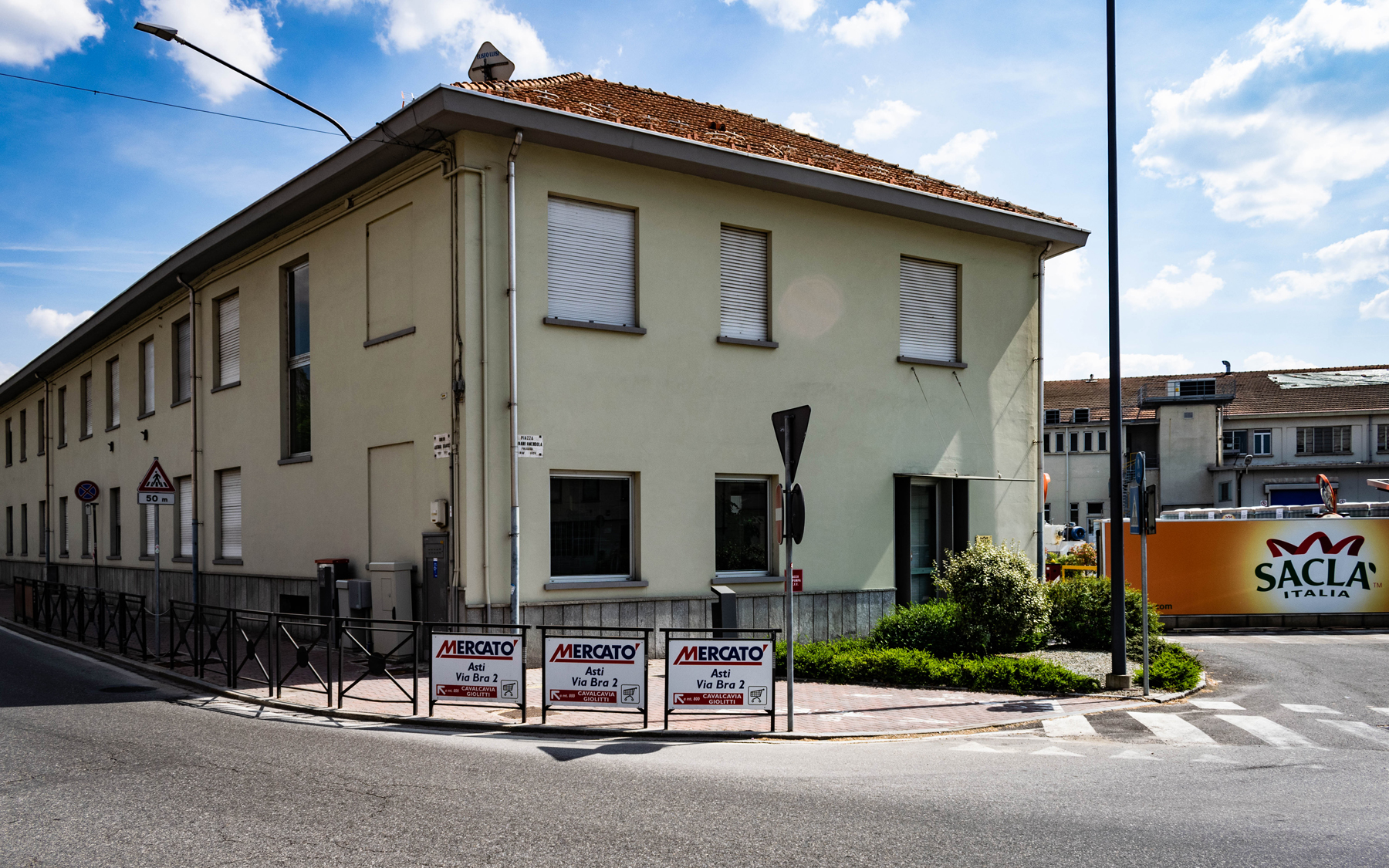
- Headquarters in Asti
- Type: Private
- Industry: Food processing
- Founded: 1923; 103 years ago as SALPA
- Founder: Secondo Ercole; Piera Campanella
- Headquarters: Asti, Italy
- Area served: Worldwide
- Key people: Lorenzo Ercole (President); Chiara Ercole (CEO)
- Products: Ready-made pasta sauces and canned vegetables
- Revenue: €147 million (2017)
- Number of employees: 200 (2017)
- Website: www.sacla.it

Fratelli Saclà S.p.A. is a multinational Italian food company founded by Secondo Ercole and his wife Piera Campanella in Asti, Piedmont, in north-west Italy in 1923.

Saclà focuses its international product range primarily on pasta sauces, notably pesto, alongside a smaller selection of canned vegetables. In Italy, Saclà features a wider range of products including both canned vegetables and various pestos, which are the only pasta sauces offered domestically.

As of 2024, Saclà which is still run by the founding family, with a current CEO from the third generation, Chiara Ercole, daughter of Lorenzo and granddaughter of the founders, is part of the consortium company Almaverde Bio Italia Srl specialized in the production of organic products.

== History ==
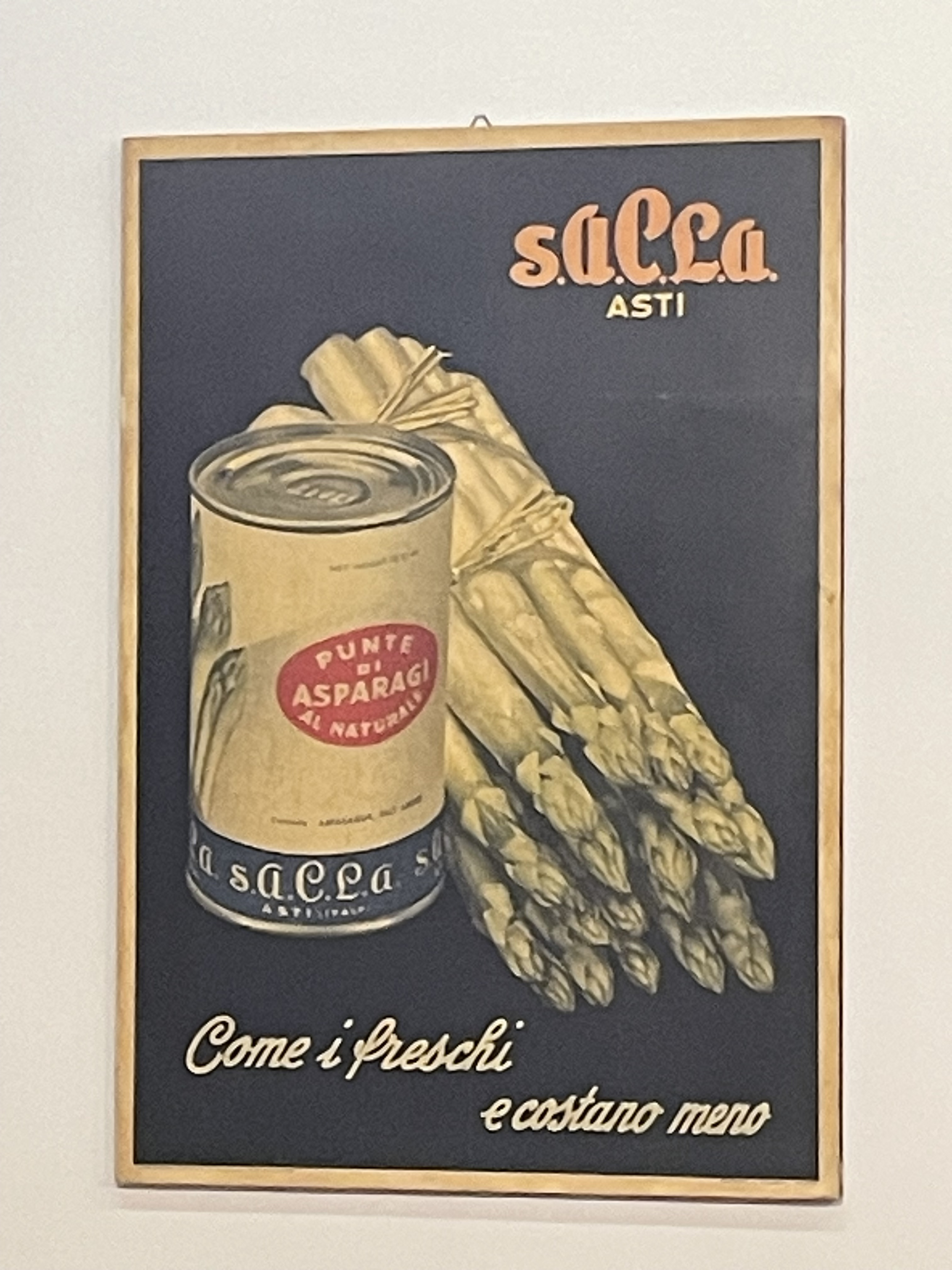
Saclà asparagus advertising in 1960

Founded in Asti, Italy, in 1923 as SALPA ("Stabilimento Astese Lavorazione Prodotti Alimentari"), the company initially focused on marketing the surplus production of vegetables harvested in abundance in the Tanaro Valley.

In 1939, the company rebranded as SACLÀ ("Società Anonima Commercio e Lavorazione Alimentari"). Under the leadership of founder Secondo Ercole, it expanded its product range and flourished, becoming one of Italy's big food companies.

In 1977, the name of the company changed, becoming "Fratelli Saclà", with reference to the founder's two sons, Carlo and Lorenzo, who had long been part of the family business.

== Products in UK ==
Sacla has been present in the United Kingdom since 1991. The Saclà product in UK range includes pestos, big bold Italian sauces, intense pastes, risotto sauces, free from, whole cherry tomato sauces and antipasti. In 2009 Saclà teamed up with Lawrence Dallaglio to produce a new range of pasta sauces called Dallaglio by Saclà. In 2011 Saclà launched a range of fresh pesto, pasta sauces and pasta to the chilled cabinet.

=== Pesto ===
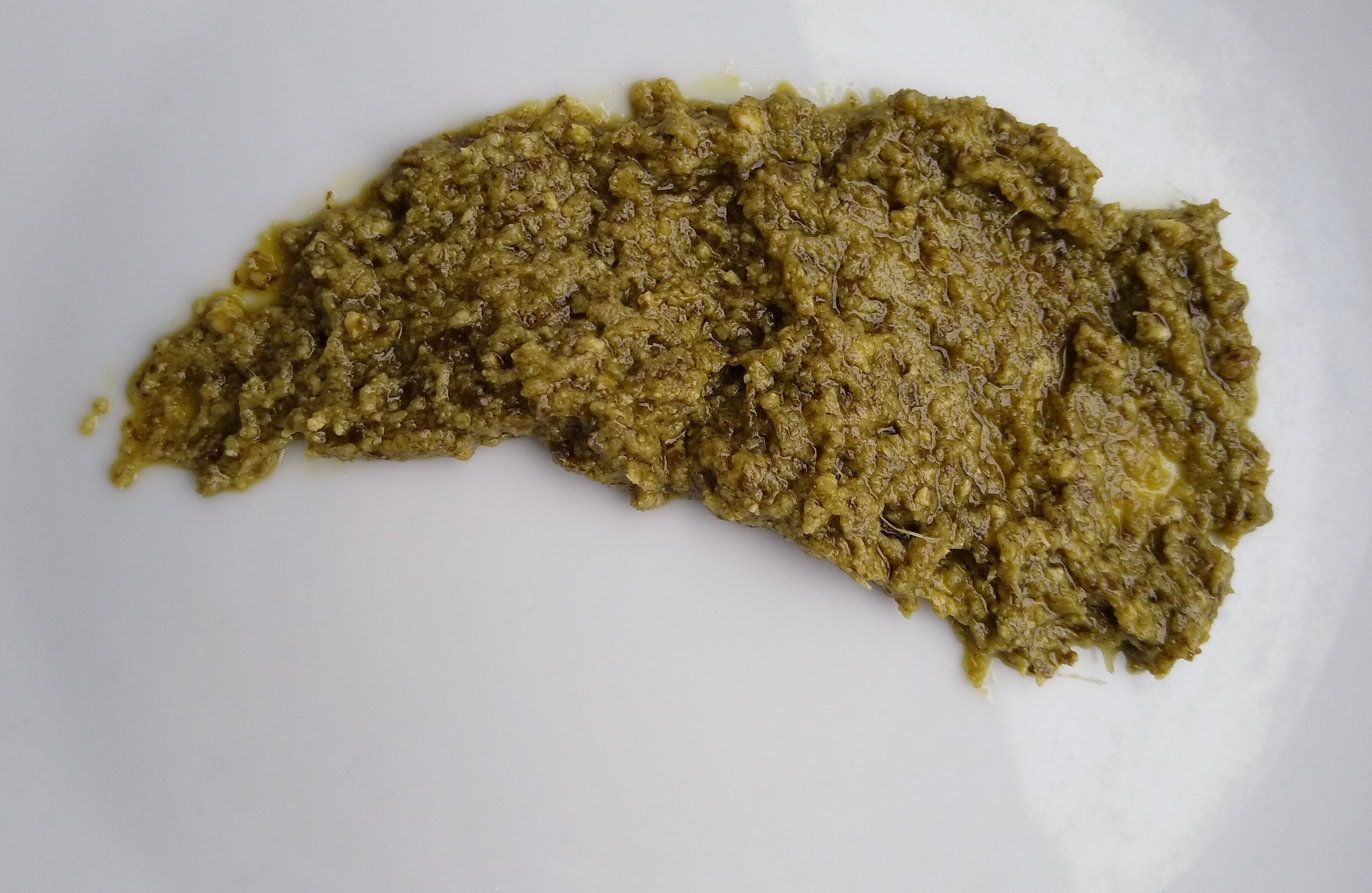
Saclà pesto

In 2011 this range was voted the UK's favourite ready-made sauce by Good Housekeeping readers. There are eight pesto recipes and two organic: Classic Basil Pesto, Sun-Dried Tomato Pesto, Fiery Chilli Pesto, Char-Grilled Aubergine Pesto, Fresh Coriander Pesto, Roasted Red Pepper Pesto, Black Olive Pesto, Truffle Pesto, and 'Nduja Pesto, and the two organic pesto sauces are Basil Pesto and Tomato Pesto. In 2015, Sacla' launched a range of Pesto Shots, in an innovative single serve packaging format.

=== Intenso Stir Through ===
This range was the winner of the 2009 'Good Housekeeping Cookery Teams Favourite' award. Flavours include: Vine Ripened Tomato and Chilli, Vine Ripened Tomato and Mascarpone and Italian Tomato and Olive.

=== Intense Paste ===
Sacla' has one Sun-Dried Tomato Cook's Paste.

=== Antipasti ===
The Sacla' antipasti range includes: Sun-Dried Tomatoes, Oven Roasted Tomatoes, Artichokes and Char-Grilled Peppers.

=== Whole Cherry Tomato Sauces ===
These sauces are made with whole cherry tomatoes and a soffritto base of virgin olive oil, celery, carrots and onions. There are four recipes. Traditional Tomato and Basil, Tomato and Parmesan, Tomato and Chilli, Tomato and Burrata and Tomato and 'Nduja.

=== Pronto Pasta Stir-in sauces ===
There are three pasta sauces in the range: Sun-dried tomato & Italian basil, spicy pepper & smoked garlic, and vine ripened tomato & pancetta.

=== Free From Sacla' range ===
Launched in 2014, the Free From Pesto range has won multiple awards and commendations for its taste, including a Healthy Food Guide and Great Taste Award. The full range includes Gluten, Dairy and Wheat Free Basil Pesto and Tomato Pesto, Free From Bolognese sauce, Free From Besciamella Sauce (not dairy free), Free From Creamy Whole Cherry Tomato Pasta Sauce, Free From Creamy Tomato Stir-in and Free From Basil Pesto and Tomato Stir-in.

=== Sacla' Professionale ===
Sacla' Professionale is a range of Products designed for Food Service, launched in 2015. The range includes products from Italy from Pesto to Black eyed peas as well as Galvanina soft drinks, which Sacla' import into the UK

== Sustainability ==
The Sacla' family has fitted solar panels on the roof of one of the main buildings. Most Saclà products are packed in glass, so they are fully recyclable.
