= Jettie Fokkens =

Dutch volleyball player (born 1975)

Personal information
- Nationality: Dutch
- Born: 26 September 1975 (age 51); Veendam
- Hometown: Zwolle
- Height: 178 cm (5 ft 10 in)
- Spike: 300 cm (118 in)
- Block: 292 cm (115 in)

Beach volleyball information
Years	Teammate	Tours (points)
2003	Mered de Vries	3 (16)

Indoor volleyball information
- Position: Setter
- Current club: Retired
- Number: 2 (national team)

National team
1998	Netherlands

Jettie Fokkens (born 26 September 1975) is a retired Dutch volleyball and beach volleyball player.

She was part of the Netherlands women's national volleyball team at the 1998 FIVB Volleyball Women's World Championship in Japan. In 2003, she played beach volleyball together with Mered de Vries.
