= Harich, Friesland =

Harich
- Village
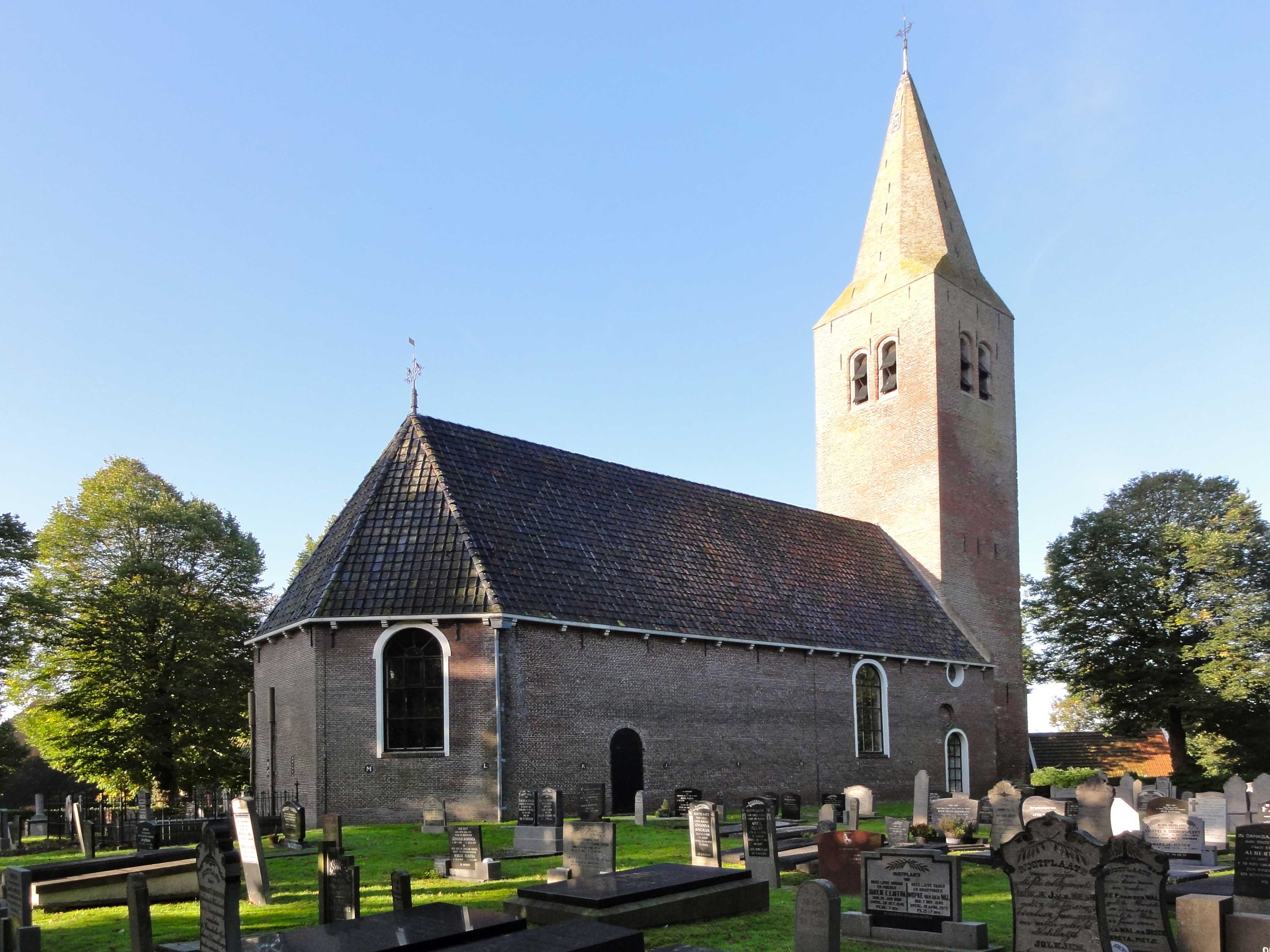
- Harich church

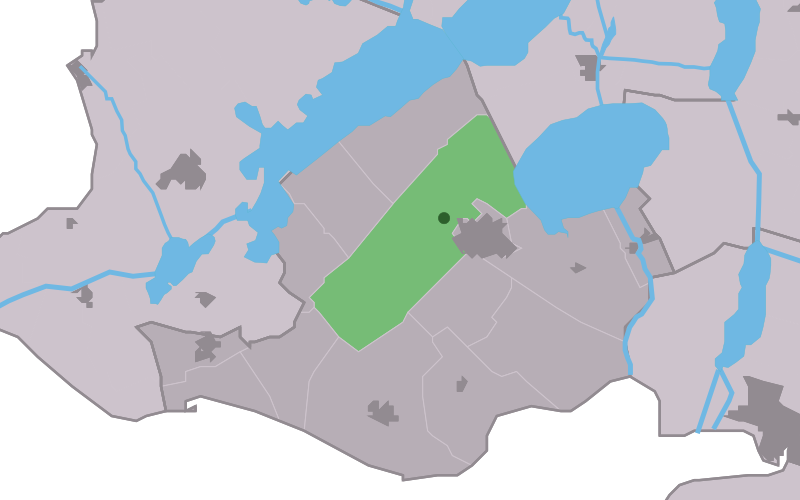
- Location in the former Gaasterlân Sleat municipality

- Location in the Netherlands Harich (Netherlands)
- Country: Netherlands
- Province: Friesland
- Municipality: De Fryske Marren

Area
  - Total: 17.23 km^{2} (6.65 sq mi)
- Elevation: 2 m (6.6 ft)

Population (2021)
  - Total: 485
  - Density: 28.1/km^{2} (72.9/sq mi)
- Time zone: UTC+1 (CET)
  - Summer (DST): UTC+2 (CEST)
- Postal code: 8571
- Dialing code: 0514

Harich is a village in De Fryske Marren municipality in the province of Friesland, the Netherlands. It had a population of around 470 in 2017.

== History ==
The village was first mentioned in 1245 as Harich, and means holy place. Harich developed on a sandy ridge around the church. The tower of the Protestant church probably dates from the 12th century. The church itself was rebuilt in 1663 after a storm. In 1840, it was home to 279 people. In 1942, the forced labour camp Wyldemerk Harich was opened in the forests near Harich.

Before 2014, Harich was part of the Gaasterlân-Sleat municipality and before 1984 it belonged to Gaasterland.

== Gallery ==
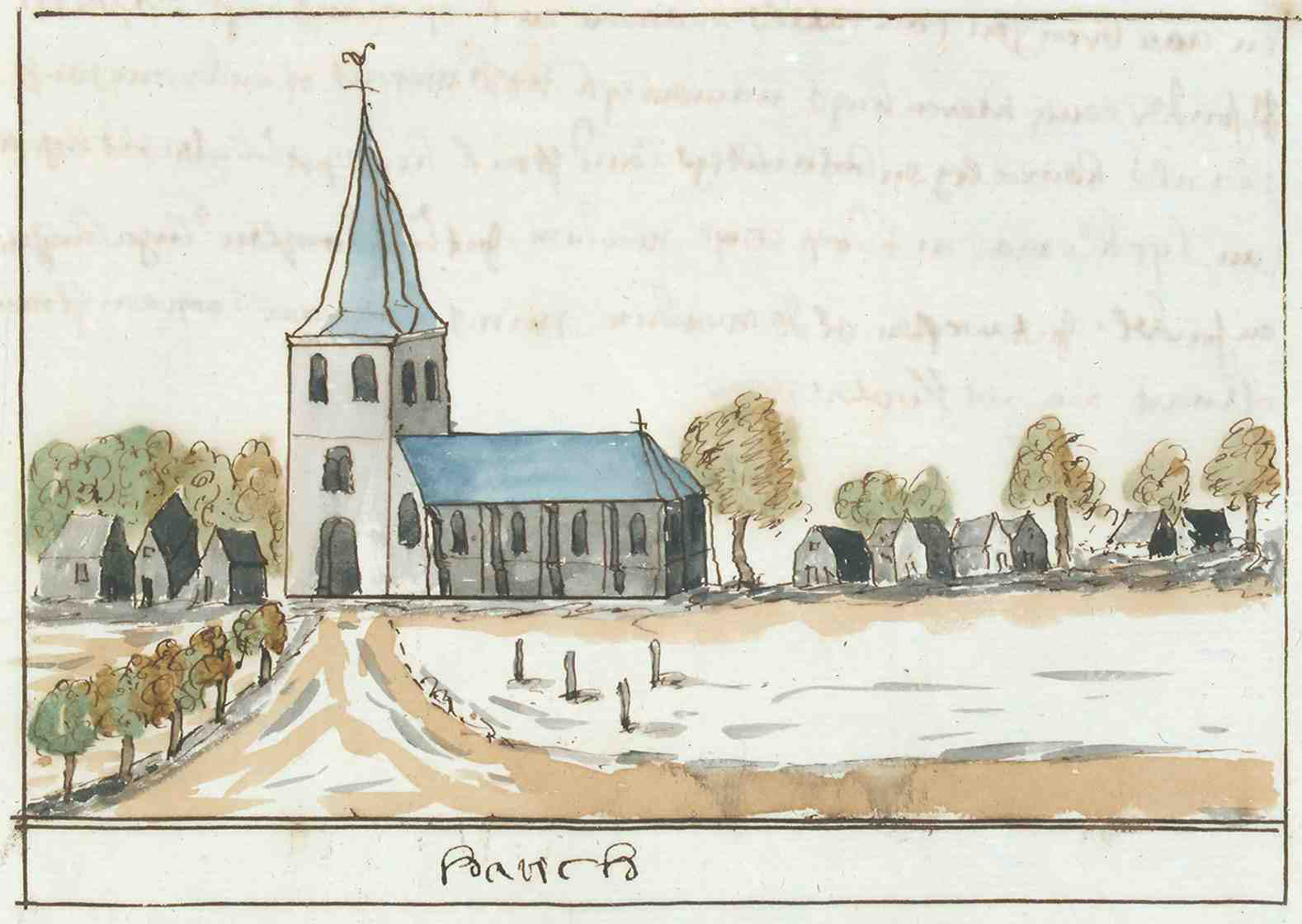
An illustration depicting the village c. 1710–1735, from the Atlas Schoemaker, currently held at the Koninklijke Bibliotheek

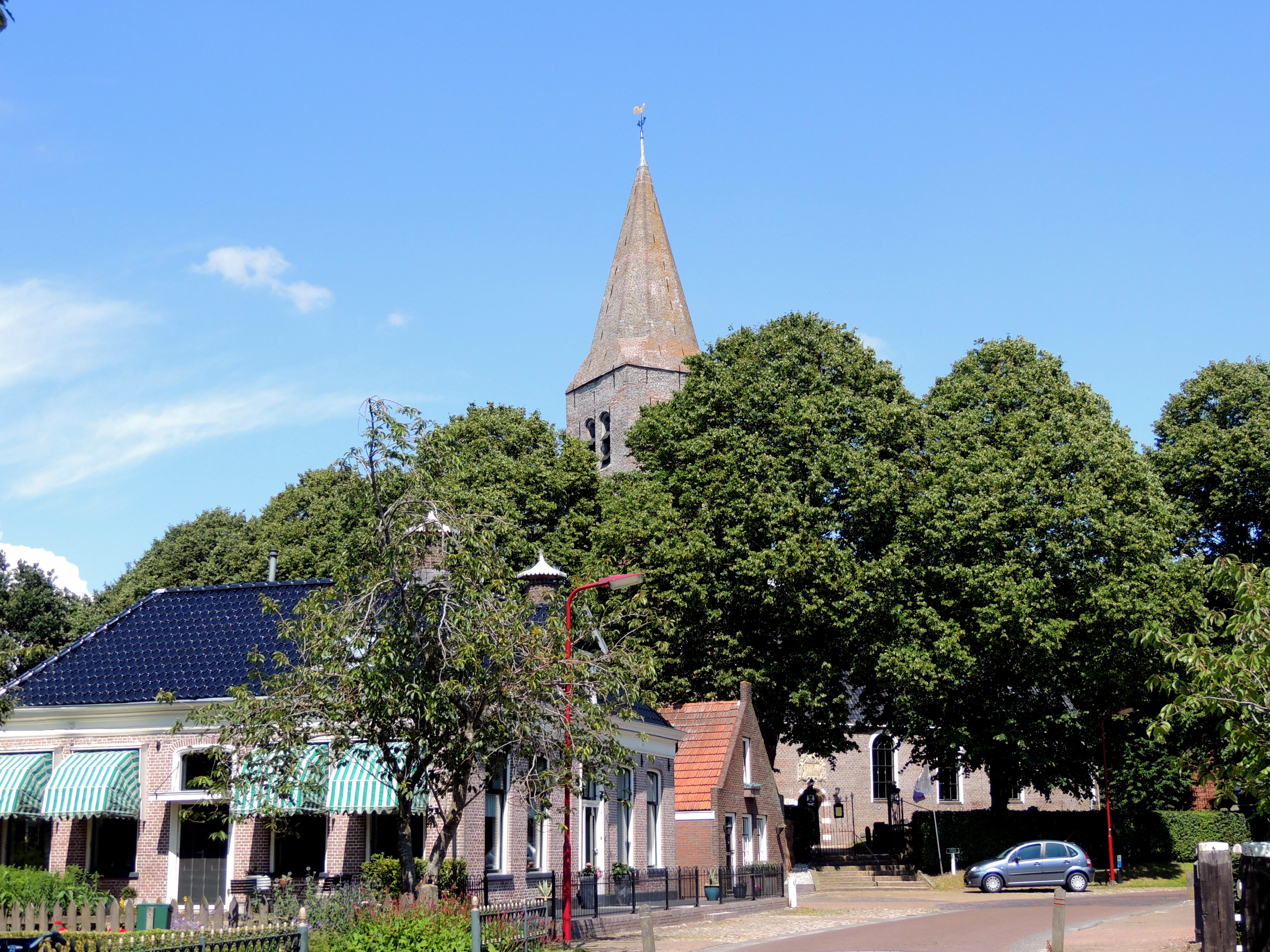
Houses around the church

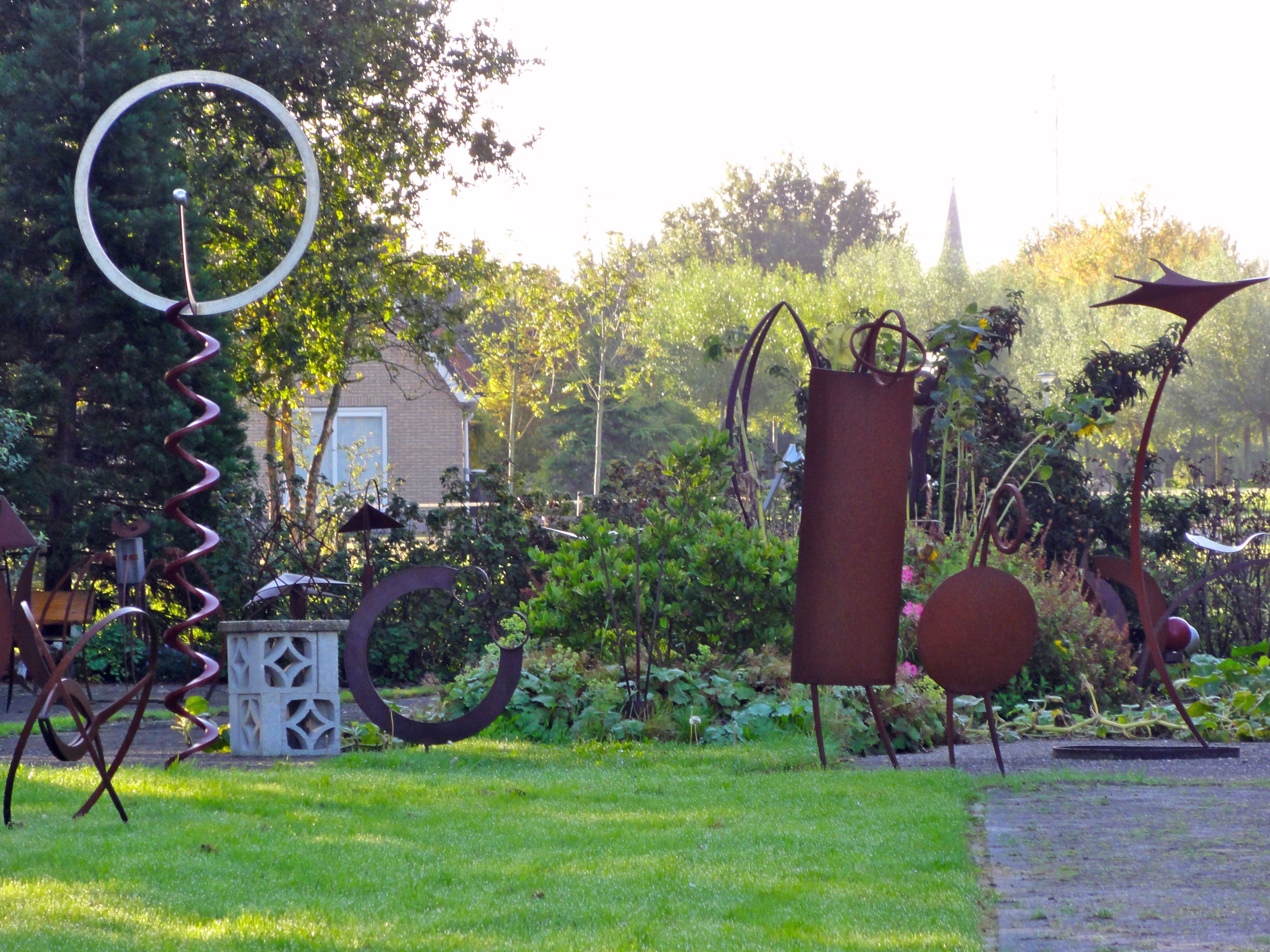
Butterfly statue garden

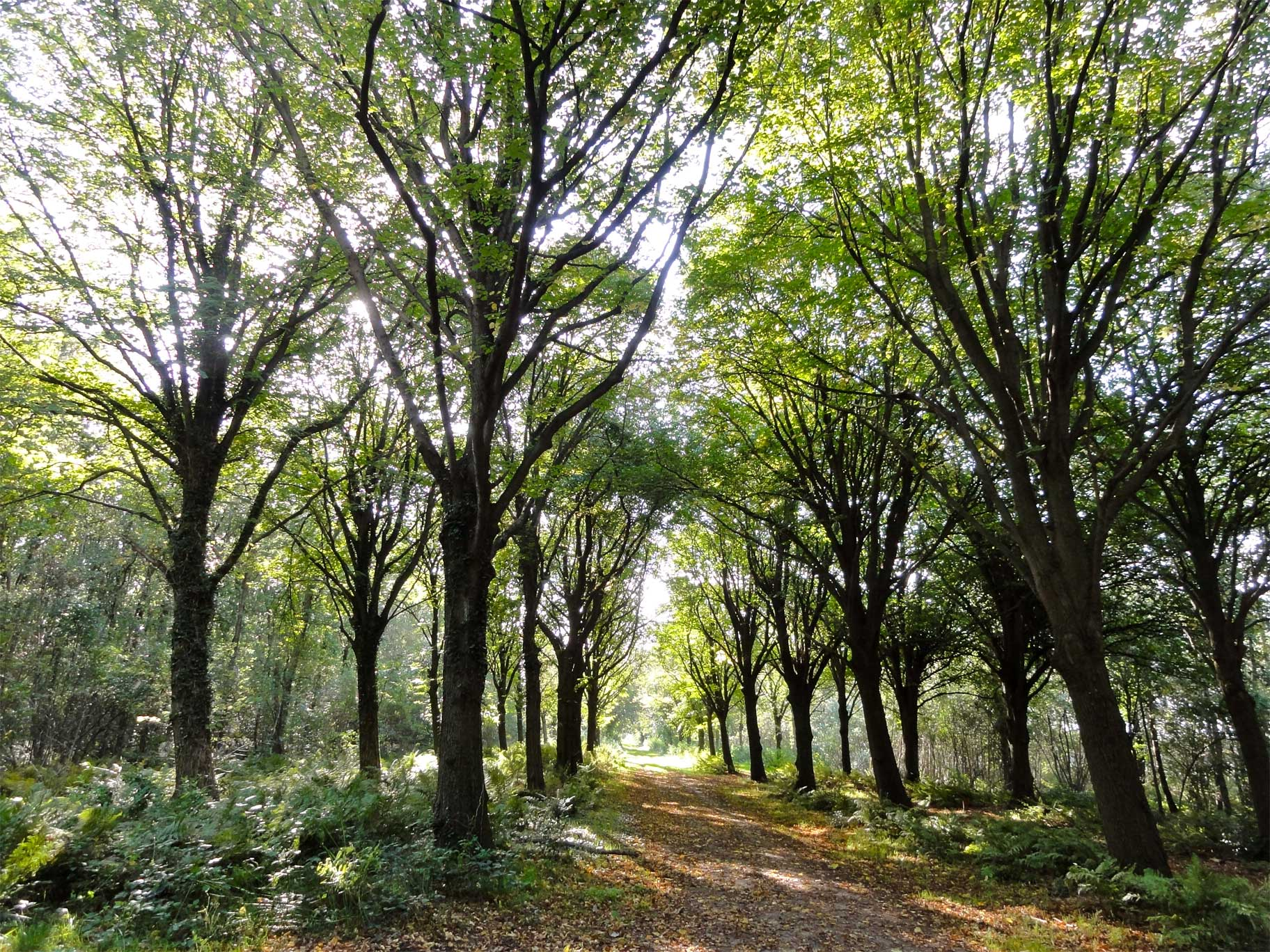
Harichster Forest
