= Alba Adriatica =

- Comune
- Comune di Alba Adriatica
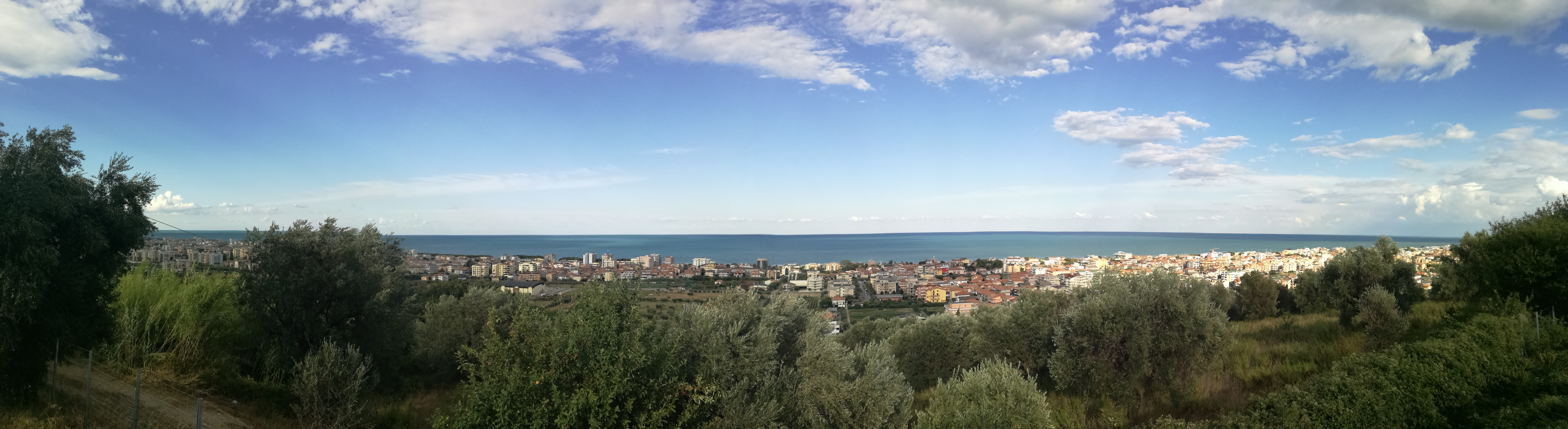
- View of Alba Adriatica

- Coat of arms

- Location of Alba Adriatica in Italy Alba Adriatica (Abruzzo)
- Coordinates: 42°50′4.92″N 13°55′15.60″E
- Country: Italy
- Region: Abruzzo
- Province: Teramo (TE)
- Frazioni: Basciani, Casasanta, Villa Fiore

Government
  - Mayor: Antonietta Casciotti (Uniamo Alba)

Area
  - Total: 9.6 km^{2} (3.7 sq mi)
- Elevation: 5 m (16 ft)

Population (30 September 2017)
  - Total: 12,475
  - Density: 1,300/km^{2} (3,400/sq mi)
- Demonym: Albensi
- Time zone: UTC+1 (CET)
  - Summer (DST): UTC+2 (CEST)
- Postal code: 64011
- Dialing code: 0861
- Patron saint: Saint Euphemia
- Saint day: September 16
- Website: Official website

Alba Adriatica is a town and comune with 12,386 residents (2014) in the province of Teramo in the Abruzzo region of central eastern Italy.

It is known as one of the "seven sisters" of the northern Abruzzo coast, i.e. the seven coastal towns in the province of Teramo, the other six being (from north to south) Martinsicuro, Tortoreto, Giulianova, Roseto degli Abruzzi, Pineto and Silvi Marina.

It is also nicknamed Spiaggia d'argento (Silver Beach) because of the high quality standard of its beach, which earned the town the European Blue Flag in years from 2000 to 2013.

The comune of Alba Adriatica was created in 1956 by splitting it off from Tortoreto.

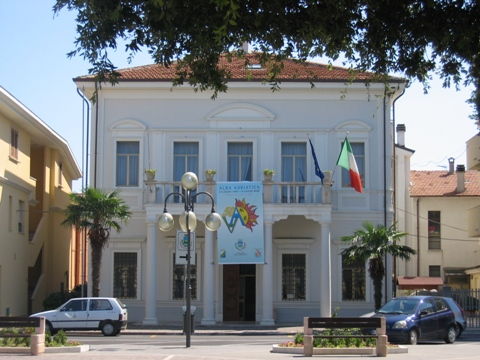
The town hall.

== People ==
- Aldo Zilli, chef
- Ivan Palazzese, motorcycle road rider
- Eugenio Calvarese, footballer
- F. Sehnaz Bac, stone designer/artist, archaeologist
- Filippo Mauroni, basketball player
