= The Man in the White Suit =

1951 film by Alexander Mackendrick

- Original quad UK cinema poster.
- Directed by: Alexander Mackendrick
- Written by: John Dighton; Roger MacDougall; Alexander Mackendrick
- Produced by: Michael Balcon
- Starring: Alec Guinness; Joan Greenwood; Cecil Parker
- Cinematography: Douglas Slocombe
- Edited by: Bernard Gribble
- Music by: Benjamin Frankel
- Production company: Ealing Studios
- Distributed by: General Film Distributors
- Release date: 10 August 1951
- Running time: 85 minutes
- Country: United Kingdom
- Language: English
- Box office: £90,000

The Man in the White Suit is a 1951 British satirical science fiction comedy film made by Ealing Studios. It stars Alec Guinness, Joan Greenwood and Cecil Parker and was directed by Alexander Mackendrick. The film was nominated for an Academy Award for Best Writing (Screenplay) for Roger MacDougall, John Dighton and Alexander Mackendrick.

It followed a common Ealing Studios theme of the "common man" against the Establishment. In this instance the hero falls foul of both trade unions and the wealthy mill owners who attempt to suppress his invention, a fabric that never wears out.

== Plot ==
Sidney Stratton, a gifted research chemist and former Cambridge scholar, is obsessed with developing a fibre that never wears out and resists dirt. His fixation and insistence on costly laboratory facilities lead to repeated dismissals from jobs at several textile mills across Northern England. At Birnley Mills, where he is employed as a labourer, Stratton secretly gains access to research equipment and, through persistence, succeeds in producing a revolutionary synthetic fibre. A suit is tailored from the material: it is brilliantly white, as it cannot absorb dye, and faintly luminous due to traces of radioactive compounds in its structure.

At first, Stratton is celebrated as a scientific pioneer. Mill owners recognise the brilliance of his discovery, and the press hails his work as a breakthrough. However, both management and organised labour quickly grasp the broader consequences. If clothing made from the fibre never wears out, the textile trade will collapse once consumers purchase sufficient garments, leaving thousands unemployed and destroying the profitability of the industry. Industrialists attempt to coerce Stratton into relinquishing his formula, while union leaders also pressure him to suppress the invention. Stratton, proud of his achievement and convinced of its benefit to humanity, refuses to compromise.

The mill owner's daughter, Daphne Birnley, is enlisted to persuade Stratton to abandon his work in return for a monetary settlement. Though initially willing, she comes to admire his integrity and instead encourages him to make his discovery public. Stratton, however, slowly realises that his creation has no allies: employers, workers, and even acquaintances oppose its release, fearing economic ruin.

The film reaches its climax with Stratton pursued through the streets at night, wearing the glowing white suit. Chased by a mob of industrialists and workers, he appears cornered, but suddenly the fabric begins to fail. The chemical structure of the fibre proves unstable, and the suit disintegrates before the crowd's eyes. Triumphant, the mob strips away the remnants, leaving Stratton in his underclothes. Only Daphne and Bertha, a sympathetic mill worker, express pity for his plight.

The following morning, Stratton is dismissed from his position at Birnley Mills. As he gathers his belongings, he examines his laboratory notes. A sudden insight strikes him, and he exclaims, "I see!" He departs with renewed determination, suggesting he will resume his quest elsewhere.

== Cast ==
- Alec Guinness as Sidney Stratton
- Joan Greenwood as Daphne Birnley
- Cecil Parker as Alan Birnley
- Michael Gough as Michael Corland
- Ernest Thesiger as Sir John Kierlaw
- Howard Marion-Crawford as Cranford
- Henry Mollison as Hoskins
- Vida Hope as Bertha
- Patric Doonan as Frank
- Duncan Lamont as Harry
- Harold Goodwin as Wilkins
- Colin Gordon as Hill
- Joan Harben as Miss Johnson
- Arthur Howard as Roberts
- Roddy Hughes as Green
- Stuart Latham as Harrison
- Miles Malleson as the Tailor
- Edie Martin as Mrs. Watson
- Mandy Miller as Gladdie, little girl who sends a message for Stratton
- Charlotte Mitchell as Mill Girl
- Olaf Olsen as Knudsen
- Desmond Roberts as Mannering
- Ewan Roberts as Fotheringay
- John Rudling as Wilson
- Charles Saynor as Pete
- Russell Waters as Davidson
- Brian Worth as King
- George Benson as the Lodger
- Frank Atkinson as the Baker
- Charles Cullum as 1st Company Director
- F.B.J. Sharp as 2nd Company Director
- Scott Harold as Express Reporter
- Jack Howarth as Receptionist at Corland Mill
- Jack McNaughton as Taxi Driver
- Judith Furse as Nurse Gamage
- Billy Russell as Nightwatchman

== Production ==
The Man in the White Suit was produced by Ealing Studios, directed by Alexander Mackendrick, and starred Alec Guinness, Joan Greenwood, and Cecil Parker.

Interior scenes were filmed at Ealing Studios in London, with the studio’s offices adapted to represent mill interiors. Location filming took place in Burnley, Lancashire, where Ashfield Road and the railway viaduct appear in exterior scenes. Additional shots were filmed at Brimsdown railway station in Enfield, which doubled for the fictional Wellsborough station.

== Release ==
The film opened at the Odeon Marble Arch cinema in London on 10 August 1951, and was one of the most popular films of the year in Britain. It earned rentals of $460,000 in the United States and Canada, though one later report gave the figure as $500,000.

A newly restored 4K edition premiered at the Edinburgh International Film Festival in August 2025, before being issued on home media the following month.

== Sound ==
The gurgling musical theme, "Guggle Glub Gurgle", that plays when Sidney Stratton's apparatus is bubbling was created by sampling laboratory equipment. Jack Parnell sampled the motif and incorporated it into his "White Suit Samba".

== Reception ==
Upon its release, The Man in the White Suit received critical praise for its satirical treatment of industrial and scientific progress. Bosley Crowther of The New York Times described it as "a deft and sardonic little satire on the working of modern industry." Writing for Sight & Sound, Penelope Houston praised Alec Guinness’s performance and Mackendrick’s direction, noting that the film combined "Ealing comedy charm with a sharper political edge."

The film won a nomination for the Academy Award for Best Writing, Story and Screenplay in 1953, and received the BAFTA Award for Best British Screenplay in 1952.

In later years, the film’s reputation endured. The British Film Institute ranked it 58th in its list of the 100 greatest British films. In 2014, The Guardian selected it as one of the twenty best British science fiction films. On the review aggregator Rotten Tomatoes, the film holds an approval rating of 94% based on 18 reviews, with the consensus praising its "witty script and Alec Guinness’s impeccable performance."

The film has also influenced later storytellers. Harve Bennett cited it as instructive when writing Star Trek III: The Search for Spock. He argued that the Genesis device risked undermining narrative credibility, and recalled the film’s lesson that "for every great advance, you pay a price," which inspired the eventual scenario of the film.

== Stage adaptation ==
A stage play based on the film directed by Sean Foley and starring Stephen Mangan and Kara Tointon opened at the Theatre Royal, Bath in September 2019 before transferring to the Wyndham's Theatre in London's West End.

== See Also ==
- Fantasy Island S3:E13 "The Inventor" / "On the Other Side"
