= Kirill (web series) =

2008 online science fiction drama

The title card for the series

Kirill is an online science fiction drama web series. It was commissioned by MSN and produced by Endemol Digital Studios and Pure Grass Films. Episodes are four minutes long and were released twice a week on the internet. The main episodes are narrated by a character, played by David Schofield.

== Synopsis ==
Kirill is a multi-layered drama project, hosted by MSN, and was launched in September 2008. There are ten episodes, each featuring an old man in a lonely room, filled only with a computer and radio apparatus. The man continuously tries to contact someone in order to warn them about an impending danger, the details of which become apparent throughout the series.

== Episodes ==
1. "Tagged"
2. "Water"
3. "Outside"
4. "Night"
5. "Food"
6. "History"
7. "Pain"
8. "Visitor"
9. "Death"
10. "Beginning"
