= Legend (film score) =

Soundtrack album by Jerry Goldsmith
- Released: 1986 (Vinyl); 1992 (CD)
- Recorded: 1985
- Genre: Classical, orchestral
- Length: 46:06
- Label: Up-Art

Compact disc versions

2002 Reissue

Professional ratings
Review scores
Source	Rating
AllMusic	4.5/5 stars
Filmtracks	4/5 stars

Legend: The Music of Jerry Goldsmith is a musical film score by American composer Jerry Goldsmith, released in 1986 for the worldwide release of the film of the same name (excluding the US). The original album was produced by Jerry Goldsmith, and favored the score's more lyrical passages, and was released on LP by Up-Art in 1986. The score was later issued on compact disc in 1992 through Silva Screen records, featuring alternate cover art. As the Up-Art release was conceived for the more-limited running time of the LP format, Silva Screen took advantage of the CD format's increased running time and added additional music (much of it from the score's darker and more sinister moments). The Silva Screen CD also featured extensive liner notes by film music historian Paul Andrew MacLean.

== Background ==
Goldsmith's score was featured in the original version of the film, but due to a disappointing test screening with the original orchestral score, director Ridley Scott decided to make changes to the film. Sidney Sheinberg, president of MCA (the parent company of Universal at the time), felt that the Goldsmith score would not appeal to the youth and pressed Scott for a new score. German group Tangerine Dream was contracted to complete a new, more contemporary score—-a job they completed in three weeks.

== Track listing ==
No.	Title	Length
1.	"My True Love's Eyes/The Cottage"	5:02
2.	"The Riddle"	3:40
3.	"Sing the Wee"	1:06
4.	"The Goblins"	3:41
5.	"The Dress Waltz"	2:44
6.	"The Ring"	6:29
7.	"The Unicorns"	7:53
8.	"Bumps and Hollows"	5:03
9.	"Forgive Me"	5:11
10.	"Reunited"	5:17

Compact disc version
No.	Title	Length
1.	"Main Title/The Goblins (Note: Contains previously unreleased material)"
2.	"My True Love's Eyes (Note: Lyrics by John Bettis)/The Cottage"
3.	"The Unicorns"
4.	"Living River/Bumps and Hollows/The Freeze"
5.	"The Faeries/The Riddle"
6.	"Sing The Wee"
7.	"Forgive Me"
8.	"Faerie Dance"
9.	"The Armour"
10.	"Oona*/The Jewels"
11.	"The Dress Waltz"
12.	"Darkness Fails"
13.	"The Ring"
14.	"Reunited"
