= Cork Hubbert =

American actor (1952–2003)

- Born: Carl Hubbert; July 3, 1952; Pendleton, Oregon, U.S.
- Died: September 28, 2003 (aged 51); Venice, California, U.S.
- Occupation: Actor
- Years active: 1979–2003

Carl "Cork" Hubbert (July 3, 1952 – September 28, 2003) was an American film and television actor.

== Biography ==
Carl Hubbert was born on July 3, 1952, in Pendleton, Oregon. He is best known for the roles of Luther on the American television show The Charmings, Rollo Sweet in Under the Rainbow and Brown Tom in the Ridley Scott film Legend. He is also featured in the supporting cast of the 1985 Nancy Allen comedy Not for Publication. He also starred as Cousin Lymon in The Ballad of the Sad Café. Hubbert's struggles as an actor after Under the Rainbow and Magnum, P.I. were chronicled as part of The Sweeps: Behind the Scenes in Network TV, Mark Christensen and Cameron Stauth's book on NBC's 1983-1984 TV season.

== Death ==
Hubbert died in 2003 in Venice, Los Angeles, from complications of diabetes.

== Filmography ==
Year	Title	Role	Notes
1979	Property		
1980	Where the Buffalo Roam	Briggs, Bell Captain	
1981	Caveman	Ta	
1981	Under the Rainbow	Rollo Sweet	
1982	The Fall Guy	Swifty Leonard	
1983	Magnum, P.I.	Waldo Norris	Episode: "Smaller Than Life"
1984	Not for Publication	Odo	
1985	Legend	Brown Tom	
1986	The Twilight Zone	Shawn McGool	Season 1, Episode 19a – "The Leprechaun-Artist"
1989	Sinbad of the Seven Seas	Poochie the dwarf	
1989	Criminal Act	Slater	
1991	The Ballad of the Sad Café	Cousin Lymon	
2000	Date Less	Tattoo on Ass Julio	
2003	Charmed	Head Councilman	Season 5, Episode 17 – "Lucky Charmed"
2004	Mickey's Twice Upon a Christmas	Additional Voices	Final film role
