= St Hilda's School, Westcliff-on-Sea =

St Hilda's School

Location
- 15 Imperial Avenue; Westcliff-on-Sea, Essex, SS0 8NE; England; 51°32′38″N 0°40′52″E

Information
- Type: Private day school
- Motto: Upward and Onward
- Established: 1946
- Closed: 2014
- Department for Education URN: 115405 Tables
- Headmistress: Mrs S O'Riordan
- Gender: Girls; Coeducational (3-11)
- Age: 3 to 16
- Enrolment: 120~
- Website: http://www.sthildasschool.co.uk/

St Hilda's School was a private day school for girls aged 3–16 and boys up to age 11 in Westcliff-on-Sea, Southend-on-Sea, Essex, England. It was one of few independent schools in the county which did not have a sixth form.

== History ==
St Hilda's predecessor school, St Clare's, was founded by Mrs Tunnicliffe in 1946 at Thorpe Bay. St Clare's soon outgrew its premises and new buildings in Westcliff-on-Sea were purchased. St Hilda's was opened in January 1947. The school was owned by Mrs Tunnicliffe's family.

=== Closure ===
St Hilda's School was foreclosed and closed on short notice in the summer of 2014. The last school day was 14 July 2014. The Echo newspaper reported that the school may have closed due to highly increasing levels of debt in its final years. Its headteacher Susan O'Riordan and financial director Steven Gorridge had both resigned as directors from the management board of the school on 30 April 2014. In a statement, the school's directors said that "excess capacity" for independent school places in the area was behind the decision. "We have sought finance, possible buyers and mergers, and various other possibilities notwithstanding considerable financial input from ourselves," they stated. The insolvency firm DKF Insolvency Ltd assisted with the school's liquidation.

== Former pupils ==
- Hannah Tointon, actress
- Kara Tointon, actress
- Nathalie Emmanuel, actress
- Jessica Morgan, journalist
