= The Ballad of the Sad Café (film) =

1991 film

- Theatrical release poster
- Directed by: Simon Callow
- Written by: Michael Hirst
- Based on: The Ballad of the Sad Café by Carson McCullers; The Ballad of the Sad Café by Edward Albee
- Produced by: Ismail Merchant
- Starring: Vanessa Redgrave; Keith Carradine; Rod Steiger; Cork Hubbert; Austin Pendleton; Beth Dixon; Lanny Flaherty; Mert Hatfield; Earl Hindman; Anne Pitoniak
- Cinematography: Walter Lassally
- Edited by: Andrew Marcus
- Music by: Richard Robbins
- Distributed by: Angelika Films
- Release dates: 28 March 1991 (New Directors/New Films); 8 May 1991 (U.S.)
- Running time: 100 minutes
- Countries: United States; Canada
- Language: English
- Budget: $3.5 million
- Box office: $200,000 (US)

The Ballad of the Sad Café is a 1991 Southern Gothic drama film directed by Simon Callow in his directorial debut, and starring Vanessa Redgrave, Keith Carradine, and Rod Steiger. Its plot follows Amelia, a moonshiner in rural 1930s Georgia whose lonely life is interrupted by the arrival of two men: First, her long-lost cousin, and later, her former husband recently released from prison.

A co-production between the United States and Canada, the film's screenplay was written by Michael Hirst, adapted from the Edward Albee play, which in turn was based on a novella in a collection of short stories of the same title by American writer Carson McCullers. The film was entered into the 41st Berlin International Film Festival.

== Plot ==
In 1930s Georgia, Miss Amelia is a lonely, eccentric moonshiner who dominates her small farming community, selling moonshine to locals and acting as the town's makeshift doctor. While she is liked by some, others find her brusque nature unbecoming. Late one night, a hunchbacked dwarf named Lymon arrives at Amelia's mercantile, claiming to be her long-lost cousin. Amelia is skeptical of Lymon's claim, but comes to believe him when he presents a tattered photograph of them together as children. Amelia invites Lymon to stay with her indefinitely. Locals in town swiftly begin rumors that Amelia has boarded the stranger and subsequently murdered him. The charismatic Lymon invites the locals into Amelia's mercantile and entertains them, assuaging their fears.

Amelia welcomes Lymon's company, and quickly grows fond of him. Lymon convinces Amelia to turn her business operation into a café for the locals, ingratiating both him and Amelia into the community. One night, Lymon interrupts a Ku Klux Klan meeting and is threatened by the members. Later, Amelia is unnerved by the news that her ex-husband Marvin Macy has been released from the state penitentiary and is returning to town, but she does not elucidate the details of his wrongdoings to Lymon.

It is revealed that Marvin, known for being a cruel criminal, once fell in love with Amelia leading him to attempt to become a better person. He proposed marriage to her which she accepted but then attacked him on their wedding night. Marvin attempted to win her over by giving her his worldly possessions but she remained uninterested leading to violent confrontation later.

Lymon grows fascinated by the returning Marvin and emulates him, while Marvin and Amelia continue to quibble with one another. Marvin is insouciant and demeaning to Lymon, though their interactions with one another breed jealousy in Amelia. Amelia attempts to poison Marvin by serving him poisoned grits in her café, but Marvin refuses to eat the food. The rest of the patrons look on as Amelia accidentally eats a portion of the poisoned food herself, making herself ill.

With the townspeople having grown weary of Amelia and Marvin's ongoing feud, they stage a public fight between the two in the café. Amelia and Marvin violently punch one another repeatedly as the townspeople observe the spectacle in varying states of awe and horror. The lengthy fight ends in Marvin defeating Amelia, leaving both bloodied and battered, and Amelia exits the café, sobbing. That night, Marvin returns to the café and ransacks it, with Lymon joining in. The two then destroy Amelia's moonshine still.

== Cast ==
- Vanessa Redgrave as Miss Amelia
- Keith Carradine as Marvin Macy
- Cork Hubbert as Cousin Lymon
- Rod Steiger as Rev. Willin
- Austin Pendleton as Lawyer Taylor
- Beth Dixon as Mary Hale
- Lanny Flaherty as Merlie Ryan
- Mert Hatfield as Stumpy McPhail
- Earl Hindman as Henry Macy
- Anne Pitoniak as Mrs. McPhail
- Frederick Johnson as Jeff
- Lauri Raymond as Sadie Ricketts
- Joe Stevens as Henry Ford Crimp (as Joe Stephens)
- Keith Wommack as Tom Rainey
- Kevin Wommack as George Rainey
- Laura Burns as Molly Kelly

== Production ==
=== Development ===
Actress Vanessa Redgrave championed screenwriter Michael Hirst's adaptation of the Edward Albee play (which itself was based on the novella by Carson McCullers), and her involvement in the project was integral to it receiving funding. Director Simon Callow found Albee's original play "too talkative" for the medium of film, and as a result, Hirst's screen adaptation features less dialogue.

=== Casting ===
Redgrave was cast in the role of Amelia from the production's outset. In preparing for the part, Redgrave made certain alterations to the character's appearance and manner:

I thought I should make very simple, clear choices about how to play Miss Amelia. I discussed each choice with Simon Callow, our director. I had to make a choice about her appearance, and I am still not sure I made the right one. Carson McCullers specifically writes that Miss Amelia has dark hair, but I thought I should have as little disguise as possible in the part. Given the fact that I am blonde and basically fair, with blue eyes, I decided to go for looking like a real straw-headed Southerner...I thought that Miss Amelia should be presented like a cartoon image, looking the same way until something very significant happens in the story. When it does, she changes out of her dungarees and wears a red dress to mark the fact that she has become a woman. I wanted her to appear to have remained rather like a twelve- or thirteen-year-old boy emotionally.

Willem Dafoe was considered for the part of Marvin, but demanded a salary too high for the film's budget. Keith Carradine was cast in the role instead.

=== Filming ===
Principal photography took place in the summer of 1990 in Spicewood, Texas, near Austin, as well as in Seguin, on a budget of $3 million. In order to perfect a Southern American accent from her native English accent, Redgrave studied with George Burns, an English professor at the University of Texas at Austin. She added, "Not only that, [George] knew how to wiggle and flap his ears, and he made an electrical device that, placed behind Cork Hubbert's ears, produced a wiggle for the camera that convinced all spectators that Cousin Lymon could flap his ears."

== Release ==
The film had its premiere at the New Directors/New Films Festival in New York City on March 28, 1991, before being released in the United States on May 8 of that year.

=== Critical reception ===
The Ballad of the Sad Café was met with mixed reviews from critics. Roger Ebert praised the film, awarding it three out of four stars and writing: "All of this is about as believable as those breathless Dateline America reports you read in the British trash press about snake-worshipping cults in Louisiana Sunday schools. But it plays well, if you can dismiss from your mind any remote expectation that the behavior in the film will mirror life as we know it. And Vanessa Redgrave, imperious and vibrating with passion, makes a proud, sad Miss Amelia."

Vincent Canby of The New York Times was less enthusiastic about the film, writing: "Miss Redgrave was, is and will always remain one of the greatest actresses in what's generally referred to as the English-speaking theater. She is so great, in fact, that when she goes off the track, as she does here, she continues to barrel forward with the momentum of a transcontinental express train that will not be stopped. The spectacle takes the breath away. The Ballad of the Sad Cafe is that kind of movie. It's not silly as much as it's majestically wrongheaded. It's a movie in which all options have been considered at length before the worst possible choices have been made."

Peter Rainer of the Los Angeles Times praised Redgrave and Carradine's performances, but criticized the film's visual elements, writing: "If Callow had approached the McCullers’ material with a visual lyricism to match the lyricism of her prose, he might have come up with a more energetic movie. But Callow doesn’t have the movie-making skills to put his magic across. He falls back on a stock catalogue of cliches: clouds passing across a full moon, branches trembling in the wind, and so on." Clifford Terry of the Chicago Tribune made similar criticisms, noting that, "On the page, Ballad flows as leisurely as a Georgia stream in August, but onscreen the end effect is that of sheer somnolence. While McCullers' story pulls back from the blend of Gothic menace and perversity, the motion picture by its very nature is obliged to underline it."

The Washington Post's Hal Hinson also criticized the film's adaptation to the screen, noting that, "On some dark, subterranean level, McCullers was thrashing out her bloody vision of emotional dysfunction and the impossibility of love, but Callow can't approximate the author's gift for sadomasochistic spelunking; he leads us into her dank caves, but once he gets there his flashlight goes dead." He summarized the film as "mostly an irritating exercise in mystification; it's murky nonsense, but Redgrave's presence is a guarantee that the nonsense is shot through with genius."

=== Home media ===
SVS/Triumph Video released a VHS edition of the film on 16 June 1992. The film was released on DVD as part of the Merchant Ivory Collection in January 2005. The Cohen Film Collection released a newly-restored Blu-ray edition on 6 December 2022.
