= Not for Publication (1984 film) =

1984 film by Paul Bartel

- Theatrical release poster
- Directed by: Paul Bartel
- Written by: Paul Bartel; John Meyer
- Produced by: Anne Kimmel
- Starring: Nancy Allen; David Naughton; Alan Rosenberg; Alice Ghostley; Cork Hubbert; Laurence Luckinbill
- Cinematography: George Tirl
- Edited by: Alan Toomayan
- Music by: John Meyer
- Production company: Thorn EMI Films
- Distributed by: The Samuel Goldwyn Company
- Release date: November 1, 1984
- Running time: 87 minutes
- Country: United States
- Language: English
- Budget: $3 million

Not for Publication is a 1984 American screwball comedy film directed by Paul Bartel and starring Nancy Allen, David Naughton, Laurence Luckinbill, Alan Rosenberg, and Alice Ghostley. The film premiered on November 1, 1984 and was also screened at the 1985 Sundance Film Festival, where it was acquired for distribution by Thorn EMI Screen Entertainment.

== Plot ==
Lois Thornedyke is an ambitious journalist who works for The Informer, a tabloid newspaper in New York City. Though her editor Troppogrosso wants her to focus on "sex, scandal, and sin", Lois longs for the days when the newspaper was called The Enforcer, which was then run by her father and had a more respected image. At The Informer, Lois writer under the pen name "Louise Thorne". She also moonlights as a volunteer for the re-election campaign of Mayor Claude Franklyn. Franklyn, attracted to Lois and unaware of her affiliation with The Informer, recruits her as his personal assistant. Lois hires Barry Denver as a photographer for Franklyn's campaign, though Barry's previous experience was in ornithological photography.

Troppogrosso assigns Lois to investigate a sex club called The Bestiary after he gets a tip that the mayor will be in attendance. Barry and Lois are able to sneak into the club dressed in animal costumes. Though they do not see the mayor, the party is interrupted when a gang of burglars storms the club. Posing as thieves themselves in order to get a scoop, Lois and Barry end up in the thieves' hideaway, where Barry discovers to his dismay that Lois is actually "Louise Thorne" of The Informer, and that he has inadvertently been working for the tabloid the whole time.

It is revealed that Franklyn is actually the boss of the crime syndicate that was involved in the club robbery, and he had hired Troppogrosso to orchestrate the robberies as well as to run the tabloid, which is fifty percent owned by Franklyn. Franklyn admits this to Lois and Barry while they are on a plane en route to a campaign event. Unbeknownst to the mayor, Lois has surreptitiously recorded his confession. In exchange for not releasing the incriminating evidence to the public, Lois makes a deal with the mayor to have the name of The Informer changed back to The Enforcer. Later, the front page of the revamped newspaper announces that the mayor has won re-election and Lois and Barry are engaged.

== Cast ==
- Nancy Allen as Lois Thornedyke
- David Naughton as Barry Denver
- Alan Rosenberg as Bernie
- Alice Ghostley as Doris Denver
- Cork Hubbert as Odo
- Laurence Luckinbill as Mayor Franklyn
- Jeanne Evans as Mrs. Thornedyke
- Christopher Wycliff as 1st photographer
- Bill Engvall as 2nd photographer
- Barry Dennen as Senor Wopperico
- Richard Paul as Troppogrosso
- J. David Moeller as Sean Duffy
- Lynne Ritchie as Barbara
- Paul Bartel as TV director

== Production ==
Bartel wrote the film in the early 1970s saying " at the time it was the kind of movie I most wanted to make." The script was influenced by 1930s and 1940s screwball comedies. Bartel based the character name "Lois Thorndyke" on heroines from Frank Capra films and the comic book character Lois Lane. He after having made Eaating Raoul "as a very personal film, I was back again to wanting to make Not for Publication. It is а valentine to the movies of the thirties and forties and to their romantic illusions."

Bartel's success from Eating Raoul, enabled him to raise $3 million for this film, ten times the budget of Raoul. $2.5 million of the film's budget came from EMI. Bartel said EMI "sought me out and let me make whatever I wanted".

Bartel said the increased budget allowed for him to use a camera crane, hire relatively well known actors like Nancy Allen and David Naughton, and to produce a musical number in the film.

Filming began in New York City on October 3, 1983. After a week of filming in New York, the production relocated to Texas where Dallas stood in for New York. Filming concluded on November 22.

== Reception ==
=== Box office ===
The film was not a financial success, and Bartel later suggested the lack of bigger name actors was part of the reason for its low box office.

=== Critical response ===
After the film came out Bartel said "I wanted to make a charming movie that plays variations on old themes, but what I’m getting is disappointment from the critics, in large part because it isn't farther out than Raoul. I probably should have done a film noir or a musical as a follow-up."

TV Guide wrote, "The story is wildly improbable and sometimes hilariously funny. The dialog is inventive and the characters bizarre, and it all smacks of those cult movies that will have a long life in the Saturday night midnight shows around the country." Vincent Canby of The New York Times said, "Like all of Mr. Bartel's films, Not for Publication has a number of comic conceits that more often prompt knowing smiles than knee-slapping laughter", adding, "You have to work to find it funny, though the rewards are there, especially in the [film's] intensely sincere performances." Canby opined that while the film has "too much plot", it would make for a great "midnight [screening] on a Saturday, after an evening of good food, good drink and whatever else it takes to lower one's resistance to something so cheerfully if intentionally slapdash."

Tab Hunter signed Paul Bartel to direct Lust in the Dust on the basis of Eating Raoul. He wrote in his memoirs that after this he went to a screening of Not for Publication which he hated and called "not for public consumption". However Hunter and his producing partner "convinced ourselves it was the story, not the director, that was to blame" and persisted with Bartel for Lust in the Dust.

== Home media ==
On June 30, 2020, Not for Publication was released as a restored 4K Blu-ray disc by Kino Lorber. The release includes audio commentary by Allan Arkush, Bartel's fellow filmmaker and friend, and filmmaker and historian Daniel Kremer.

== Notes ==
- Verniere, James (April 1985). "For Publication: interview with Paul Bartel". Heavy Metal. pp. 54–56.
