= Kara Tointon =

English actress (b. 1983)

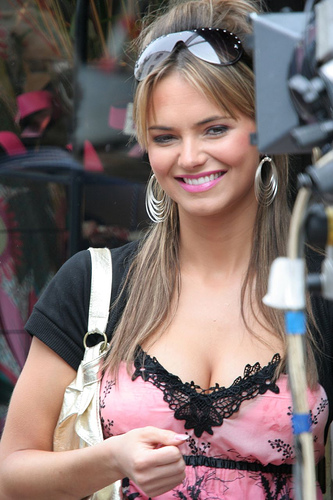
- Tointon filming on the set of EastEnders in 2008
- Born: 5 August 1983 (age 43); Basildon, Essex, England
- Occupation: Actress
- Years active: 1994–present
- Television: EastEnders; Strictly Come Dancing; Mr Selfridge; The Sound of Music Live; The Halcyon; The Teacher
- Children: 2
- Relatives: Hannah Tointon (sister)

Kara Louise Tointon (born 5 August 1983) is an English actress, best known for portraying the role of Dawn Swann in the BBC soap opera EastEnders between 2005 and 2009. In 2010, she won the eighth series of the BBC competition series Strictly Come Dancing, and in 2015, she appeared as Maria in the ITV live production of The Sound of Music Live. She also played Erica Stoke in the eighth season of Lewis.

== Early life and education ==
Kara Tointon was born on 5 August 1983 in Basildon, Essex, England and grew up in Southend. She is the daughter of Ken Tointon, an accountant, and Carol Tointon, and the sister of Hannah Tointon, who is also an actress. Both sisters attended St Michael's School in Leigh-on-Sea and St Hilda's School in Westcliff-on-Sea.

Tointon attended speech and drama lessons as a child and was diagnosed with dyslexia at around the age of 7. At the age of 11, she joined an amateur dramatic society and later undertook examinations with the London Academy of Music and Dramatic Art (LAMDA). Tointon left school at 16 and subsequently attended art college, which she left to take a three-month acting job.

== Career ==
=== Early career (1994–2010) ===
According to BroadwayWorld, Tointon made her professional acting debut playing Brigitta in a production of The Sound of Music at the Cliffs Pavilion, and her first paid acting role was in a pantomime production of Snow White at the same venue. At the age of 11, she joined the Sylvia Young Agency, through which she began attending professional auditions. Tointon's first television appearance was as an extra in EastEnders in 1994. In 2001, Tointon played Pauline Young in the first series of the Channel 4 drama Teachers. Other appearances in this period included Dinotopia (2002) and Mile High. After appearing in Dream Team as Gina Moliano, Tointon returned to EastEnders in 2005, playing Dawn Swann until August 2009.

In 2008, Tointon won the Sport Relief special edition of Strictly Come Dancing with Mark Ramprakash, performing a samba. In August 2009, she was unveiled as the new face of Michelle for George underwear at Asda. In January 2010, she made a guest appearance in the 26th and final series of ITV's long-running police drama The Bill in "Duty Calls" as Ami Ryan. In the following July, she recorded a documentary for BBC Three called Kara Tointon: Don't Call Me Stupid, which examined the impact dyslexia can have on people's lives and how different learning styles can affect those with the condition. During the programme, Tointon visited Shapwick School in Somerset and talked with pupils about their experiences of dyslexia.

In September 2010, Tointon returned to Strictly Come Dancing for series 8 as a contestant, partnered with Artem Chigvintsev. The pair won the competition on 18 December 2010.

=== Career development (2011–2017) ===
In February 2011, Tointon took part in the BT Red Nose Desert Trek for Comic Relief that year. In the same year, Tointon also guest-starred in an episode of Sky Living's Bedlam, playing Leah (Kerry) Cole. From May to September 2011, Tointon played Eliza Doolittle in the West End production of Pygmalion at the Garrick Theatre, opposite Rupert Everett as Professor Higgins.

In spring 2012, she played Evelyn in a revival of Alan Ayckbourn's Absent Friends at the Harold Pinter Theatre, alongside Reece Shearsmith. She went on to play Ginny in Ayckbourn's Relatively Speaking, at Wyndham's Theatre, alongside Felicity Kendal, Jonathan Coy, and Max Bennett in 2013. She later appeared opposite Dougray Scott in the 2013 thriller Last Passenger, directed by Omid Nooshin.

In 2015 and 2016, Tointon played Rosalie Selfridge in the television drama series Mr Selfridge, the semi-fictional story based on the life of Harry Selfridge. Tointon played the part of Maria in The Sound of Music Live, broadcast on ITV on 20 December 2015.

In January 2017, Tointon appeared in the ITV period drama The Halcyon, which was set in the 1940s at a five-star hotel in London during the Second World War. In November 2017, Tointon played the role of Olivia in the Royal Shakespeare Company production of Twelfth Night.

=== Subsequent work (2018–present) ===
In 2018, Tointon joined 26 other celebrities at Metropolis Studios, to perform an original Christmas song called Rock With Rudolph in aid of Great Ormond Street Hospital. The song was released digitally on independent record label Saga Entertainment on 30 November 2018 under the artist name The Celebs, and debuted exclusively with The Sun. A year later in 2019, Tointon appeared alongside Stephen Mangan in a stage adaptation of The Man in the White Suit at Wyndham's Theatre in London.

Tointon played the younger Elsie Leach, mother of Cary Grant, in the ITV biographical drama Archie, in 2023. The following year in 2024, she played Rachel in the Channel 5 thriller series Too Good to Be True, also known as Captivated. Later in 2024, Tointon starred as Dani Oxley in the second series of the Channel 5 thriller The Teacher.

In July 2025, Tointon was announced as playing Willamae Abernathy in Sunrise on the Reaping, scheduled for release on 20th November 2026. In 2026, Tointon starred as Constance in Laura Wade's adaptation of The Constant Wife for a UK tour, prior to a planned West End residency.

== Personal life ==
In 2004, Tointon dated James Bourne of Busted. Their relationship was depicted in the TV series America or Busted but ended in January 2005. She was subsequently in a relationship with her EastEnders co-star James Alexandrou from April 2006 to November 2007. Tointon also dated fellow EastEnders actor Joe Swash from 2008 to 2010.

In September 2014, Tointon took part in the Great North Run to raise money for Share A Star, a charity supporting seriously ill children and teenagers. In November 2018, Tointon gave birth to her first child, a boy, with her then-fiancé Marius Jensen. The couple had a second son in 2021.

In May 2025, Tointon revealed that she had undergone a preventative double mastectomy and removal of both fallopian tubes in 2024 after genetic testing identified a BRCA1 mutation associated with an increased risk of breast and ovarian cancer. Her decision followed a family history of both cancers, including her mother's diagnosis of ovarian cancer and subsequent death from the disease.

== Filmography ==
=== Film ===
Key
| † | Denotes films that have not yet been released |

| Year | Title | Role | Ref. |
|---|---|---|---|
| 2001 | Never Play with the Dead | Victoria | |
| 2004 | The Football Factory | Tameka | |
| 2004 | The Fete (Short film) | Lizzie | |
| 2012 | The Sweeney | Megan Barret | |
| 2013 | Last Passenger | Sarah Barwell | |
| 2016 | Let's Be Evil | Tiggs | |
| 2018 | RSC Live: Twelfth Night | Olivia | |
| 2022 | The Gallery | Jamie | |
| 2026 | The Hunger Games: Sunrise on the Reaping | Willamae Abernathy | |

=== Television ===
| Year | Title | Role | Notes |
|---|---|---|---|
| 1999–2000, 2004–2005 | Dream Team | Gina Moliano | Series 3; Episodes 27 & 28, and Series 8; 21 episodes |
| 2001 | Teachers | Pauline | Series 1; Episodes 1–8 |
| 2002 | Dinotopia | 18-year-old Le Sage | Episode 3: "Handful of Dust" |
| 2002–2003 | Harry and Cosh | Gaby | Series 4; Episodes 1–14 |
| 2003 | Boudica | Poppaea | Television film |
| 2004 | Keen Eddie | Sarah Friedman | Episode 11: "Who Wants to Be in a Club That Would Have Me as a Member?" |
| 2004 | Mile High | Geneva | Series 2; Episode 18 |
| 2005–2009 | EastEnders | Dawn Swann | 345 episodes |
| 2010 | The Bill | Ami Ryan | Series 26; Episode 3: "Duty Calls" |
| 2010 | Strictly Come Dancing | Herself - Contestant | Series 8; Episodes 1–27 (Winner) |
| 2010 | Kara Tointon: Don't Call Me Stupid | Herself | Television documentary |
| 2011 | Bedlam | Leah Cole | Series 1; Episode 2: "Driven" |
| 2011 | Ideal | Herself | Series 7; Episode 1: "The Police" |
| 2014 | Lewis | Erica Stoke | Series 8; Episodes 1 & 2: "Entry Wounds: Parts 1 & 2" |
| 2014 | Celebrity Chase | Herself - Contestant | Series 4; Episode 7 |
| 2015 | SunTrap | Maria | Episode 2: "In the Line of Fire" |
| 2015 | The Sound of Music Live | Maria Rainer | Television Special (UK version of The Sound of Music Live!) |
| 2015–2016 | Mr Selfridge | Rosalie Selfridge/De Bolotoff | Series 3 & 4; 20 episodes |
| 2017 | The Halcyon | Betsey Day | Episodes 1–8 |
| 2017 | Henry IX | Serena | Episodes 1–3: "Reigned In", "Exit Strategy" and "Clearing the Air" |
| 2018 | Great Performances | Maria von Trapp | Series 46; Episode 4: "The Sound of Music" |
| 2018 | The Keith & Paddy Picture Show | Kate Beringer | Series 2; Episode 6: "Christmas Special: Gremlins" |
| 2019 | The Crystal Maze | Herself - Adventurer | Series 9; Episode 5: "Celebrities" |
| 2020 | Urban Myths | Kitty Clive | Series 4; Episode 3: "Hendrix & Handel" |
| 2023 | Father Brown | Elizabeth Barnes | Series 10; Episode 6: "The Royal Visit" |
| 2023 | Archie | Young Elsie Leach | Mini-series; Episodes 1–4 |
| 2024 | Too Good to Be True known outside the UK as Captivated | Rachel Connor | Lead role. Mini-series; Episodes 1–4 |
| 2024 | The Teacher | Dani Oxley | Lead role. Mini-series; Episodes 1–4 |

=== Music videos ===
| Year | Title | Role | Notes | Ref. |
|---|---|---|---|---|
| 2018 | Rock with Rudolph | Herself | Band: The Celebs | |

== Stage credits ==
| Year | Title | Role | Venue / production | Ref. |
|---|---|---|---|---|
| 2011 | Pygmalion | Eliza Doolittle | Garrick Theatre, London | |
| 2012 | Absent Friends | Evelyn | Harold Pinter Theatre, London | |
| 2013 | Relatively Speaking | Ginny | Wyndham's Theatre, London | |
| 2017 | Gaslight | Bella Manningham | UK Touring Production | |
| 2017–2018 | Twelfth Night | Olivia | Royal Shakespeare Theatre, Stratford-upon-Avon | |
| 2019 | The Man in the White Suit | Daphne Birnley | Theatre Royal Bath and Wyndham's Theatre, London | |
| 2026 | The Constant Wife | Constance Middleton | UK Touring Production | |

== Awards and nominations ==
| Year | Award | Category | Result | Ref. |
|---|---|---|---|---|
| 2006 | The British Soap Awards | Sexiest Female | Nominated | |
| 2006 | Inside Soap Awards | Sexiest Female | Won | |
| 2007 | The British Soap Awards | Sexiest Female | Nominated | |
| 2007 | Inside Soap Awards | Best Actress | Nominated | |
| 2007 | Inside Soap Awards | Sexiest Female | Nominated | |
| 2007 | Inside Soap Awards | Best Dressed Soap Star | Won | |
| 2007 | 13th National Television Awards | Most Popular Actress | Nominated | |
| 2008 | Digital Spy Soap Awards | Sexiest Female | Nominated | |
| 2008 | Inside Soap Awards | Sexiest Female | Won | |
| 2009 | The British Soap Awards | Sexiest Female | Nominated | |
| 2009 | Inside Soap Awards | Sexiest Female | Nominated | |
| 2009 | Inside Soap Awards | Best Dressed Soap Star | Won | |
| 2012 | WhatsOnStage Awards | London Newcomer of the Year (Pygmalion) | Nominated | |
