= The Ballad of the Sad Café =

1951 book by Carson McCullers

- First edition
- Author: Carson McCullers
- Cover artist: R Murray
- Language: English
- Genre: Southern Gothic
- Published: 1951, Houghton Mifflin
- Publication place: United States
- OCLC: 1112597
- LC Class: PS3525.A1772 B3

The Ballad of the Sad Café, first published in 1951, is a book by Carson McCullers comprising a novella of the same title along with six short stories: "Wunderkind", "The Jockey", "Madame Zilensky and the King of Finland", "The Sojourner", "A Domestic Dilemma", and "A Tree, a Rock, a Cloud".

The first edition of the book also included McCullers' previously published novels The Heart Is a Lonely Hunter, Reflections in a Golden Eye, and The Member of the Wedding.

The American playwright Edward Albee adapted the novella as a stage play in 1963, which itself was adapted into a 1991 film of the same name starring Vanessa Redgrave and Keith Carradine.

== Plot of the novella ==
"The Ballad of the Sad Cafe" opens in a small, isolated town in the Southern United States. The story introduces Miss Amelia Evans, strong in both body and mind, who is approached by a hunchbacked man with only a suitcase in hand who claims to be her kin.

When Miss Amelia, whom the townspeople see as a calculating woman who never acts without reason, takes the stranger into her home, rumors begin to circulate that Miss Amelia has done so in order to take what the hunchback has in his suitcase. When the rumors hit their peak, a group of eight men come to her store, sitting outside on the steps for the day and waiting to see if something will happen. Finally, they enter the store all at once and are stunned to see that the hunchback is alive and well. With everyone gathered inside, Miss Amelia brings out some liquor and crackers, which further shocks the men, as they have never witnessed Miss Amelia be hospitable enough to allow drinking inside her home. This is the beginning of the café. Miss Amelia and the hunchback, Cousin Lymon, unintentionally create a new tradition for the town, and the people gather inside the café on Sunday evenings, often until midnight.

It is apparent, though surprising, to the townspeople that Miss Amelia has fallen in love with Cousin Lymon, and has begun to change slightly. When the townspeople see this, they relate it to another odd incident in which Miss Amelia was also involved: the issue of her ten-day marriage. Miss Amelia had been married to a man named Marvin Macy, who was a vicious and cruel character before he fell in love with her. He changed his ways and became good-natured, but reverted to his old self when his love was rejected after a failed ten-day marriage in which he gave up everything he possessed. He broke out into a rage, committing a string of felonies before being caught and locked up in the state penitentiary.

When he is released, Marvin Macy returns to the town and begins to take advantage of Cousin Lymon's admiration for him, using him to crush Miss Amelia's heart. Macy and Miss Amelia engage in a physical fight, and just as Miss Amelia is about to take the upper hand, Lymon jumps her from behind, allowing Macy to prevail. Macy and Cousin Lymon ransack the café, break the still, steal Miss Amelia's curios and money, and disappear from town, leaving Miss Amelia alone.

The novella ends with "The Twelve Mortal Men", a brief passage about twelve men in a chain-gang, whose actions outline what happened in the town.

== Adaptations ==
The Ballad of the Sad Café was adapted into a stage play of the same name by Edward Albee in 1963.

Albee's play was adapted by screenwriter Michael Hirst into a 1991 film of the same name starring Vanessa Redgrave and Keith Carradine.

"The Sad Café" is a song based on The Ballad of The Sad Café, recorded by New York-based rock band Streetlight Circus and included on their 2016 album Needle Down.

The Ballad of the Sad Café was inspiration for the 1987 film Bagdad Cafe, written and produced by Percy Adlon and his wife, Eleanore. Adlon also directed the film which starred Marianne Sägebrecht, CCH Pounder and Jack Palance.

== See also ==
- Sad Café
