= David Schofield (actor) =

English actor (born 1951)

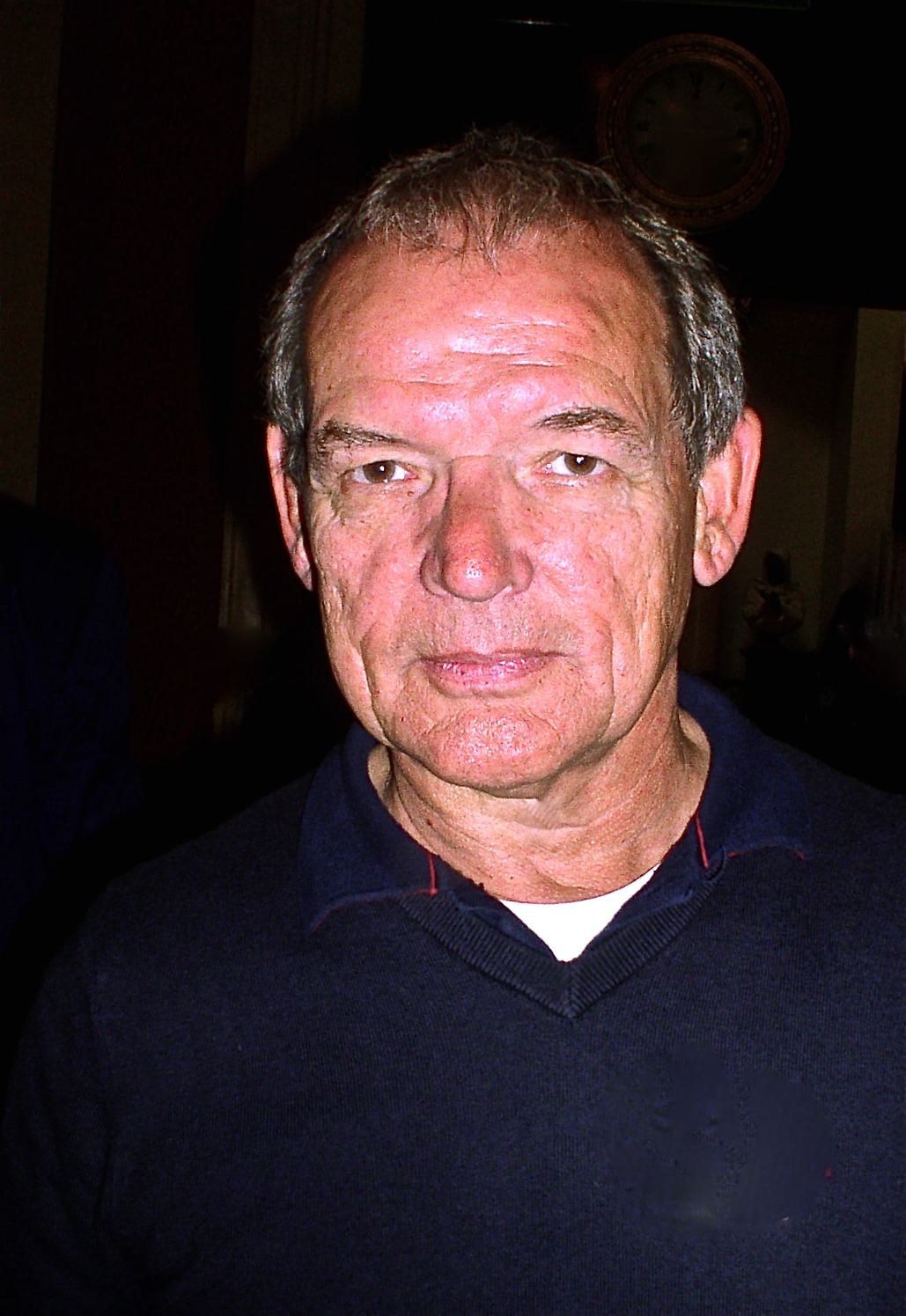
- Schofield in 2011
- Born: 16 December 1951 (age 74); Wythenshawe, Manchester, England
- Education: London Academy of Music and Dramatic Art
- Occupation: Actor
- Years active: 1972–present
- Spouse: Lally Percy
- Children: 2

David Schofield (born 16 December 1951) is an English actor. He is best known for his role as Ian Mercer in the films Pirates of the Caribbean: Dead Man's Chest (2006) and Pirates of the Caribbean: At World's End (2007). Other credits include An American Werewolf in London (1981), Gladiator (2000), From Hell (2001), Valkyrie (2008), The Wolfman (2010), Da Vinci's Demons (2013), The Last Kingdom (2015–2017), Darkest Hour (2017), Mary Magdalene (2018), and Mad Heidi (2022).

== Early life ==
Schofield was born in Wythenshawe, Manchester, England on 16 December 1951, one of ten children in a working-class family. He attended St. John Fisher and Thomas More R.C. Primary School, along with his brother, Peter. His first acting experience was at Manchester Boys' School at the age of 12. In 1967 he was accepted as student assistant stage manager at a local repertory theatre. He worked in every department as a prop-maker, sound-man, writer, stage sweeper, waiter and tea-maker, putting in 14-hour days, six days a week. After two seasons, at the age of 19, he became a student of the London Academy of Music and Dramatic Art, which he left early to pursue his path as a working actor.

== Career ==
=== Film and television ===
Schofield earned credits in TV series such as Band of Gold, Footballers' Wives, and Holby City, among many other TV productions. On the big screen he is best known as the paranoid darts player in the Slaughtered Lamb in An American Werewolf in London (1981), and his other films include The Dogs of War (1980), Tree of Hands (1989), The Last of the Mohicans (1992), Anna Karenina (1997), Gladiator (2000), From Hell (2001), and as Ian Mercer in the Pirates of the Caribbean films. He has also appeared in Valkyrie (2008), as anti-Hitler conspirator Erwin von Witzleben, The Wolfman (2010), F (2010), Burke and Hare (2010), Lord of Tears (2013), and as Peter Carmichael in the suspense thriller Last Passenger (2013). On TV he appeared alongside Jimmy Jewel in the ITV comedy-drama Funny Man (1981), played the title role Shackleton (1983), in Jekyll & Hyde (1990), alongside Michael Caine, and played DCS John Salway in the award-winning BBC series Our Friends in the North in 1996.

In 2008, he starred as Kirill, in the web series of the same name. In 2009 Schofield guest starred as King Alined in the BBC fantasy drama series Merlin. In 2011 he played the sinister Police Sergeant Foley in Hugo Blick's The Shadow Line, a seven-part series for BBC Two. In autumn 2015, he was seen as Odin in the episode "The Girl Who Died" in the ninth series of the BBC One series Doctor Who. In 2016 he appeared as Vivan Wolsey in the BBC series' Father Brown episode 4.1 "The Mask of the Demon" and The Coroner episode 2.6 "Life".

In 2017 he starred as Abbot Eadred in The Last Kingdom. In 2018, he appeared as Thomas the Apostle in the Helen Edmundson written film Mary Magdalene.

In 2022, he starred in a main role as Heidi's grandfather de:Alpöhi in the Swiss comedy horror film Mad Heidi (2022).

=== Stage ===
Schofield has performed for the Royal Shakespeare Company, the Royal National Theatre, and the Royal Exchange, Manchester. He developed the posture of, and performed the role of John Merrick, in the Bernard Pomerance play The Elephant Man for its premiere in 1977. He worked with Daniel Craig and Jason Isaacs in the National's 1993 production of Angels in America.

=== Radio ===
In 2001–02 Schofield appeared as Javert in a BBC radio adaptation of Les Misérables. Since 2007 he has played Frank Twist in the BBC Radio 4 drama series Brief Lives set in a Manchester legal practice. In 2011, he played Tellwright in Helen Edmundson's adaptation of Anna of the Five Towns.

== Selected filmography ==
Year	Title	Role	Notes
1980	The Dogs of War	Endean's Man	
1981	An American Werewolf in London	Dart Player	
1989	Tree of Hands	Detective Inspector	
1992	The Last of the Mohicans	Sergeant Major	
1997	Anna Karenina	Nikolai	
1997	Tangier Cop	Omar Larbi	
2000	The Miracle Maker	Caiaphas	Voice
2000	Gladiator	Senator Falco	
2001	Chunky Monkey	Frank	
2001	The Musketeer	Rochefort, Richelieu Henchman	
2001	From Hell	McQueen	
2001	Superstition	Roberto Fallaci	
2004	Unstoppable	Dr. Collins	
2006	Pirates of the Caribbean: Dead Man's Chest	Mr. Ian Mercer	
2007	Pirates of the Caribbean: At World's End	Mr. Ian Mercer	
2007	Freebird	Dart player	scenes deleted
2008	Valkyrie	Erwin von Witzleben	
2010	The Wolfman	Constable Nye	
2010	Devil's Bridge	Parry	
2010	F	Robert Anderson	
2010	Burke & Hare	Fergus	
2011	Ghosted	Donner	
2013	All Things to All Men	Police Commissioner	
2013	Da Vinci's Demons	Piero da Vinci	
2013	Last Passenger	Peter Carmichael	
2013	Lord of Tears	Owl Man	
2016	Mindhorn	Chief Inspector Derek Newsome	
2017	Darkest Hour	Clement Attlee	
2015–2017	The Last Kingdom	Abbot Eadred	
2018	Mary Magdalene	Thomas the Apostle	
2020	Shakespeare & Hathaway: Private Investigators	Tony King	Episode 3.2 "See Thyself, Devil!"
2020	The Adventures of Paddington	Mr. Gruber	Voice
2022	Mad Heidi	Alpöhi	

== Theatre ==
- John Merrick, The Elephant Man at the Hampstead Theatre (1977) and at the Royal National Theatre, London (1981)
- Mick Plenty at the Lyttelton Theatre (1978)
- Mark Antony, Julius Caesar at the Royal Shakespeare Theatre, Stratford-upon-Avon (1983)
- Angelo, Measure for Measure at the Royal Shakespeare Theatre, Stratford-upon-Avon and then at the Barbican (1983)
- Duke of Buckingham, Henry VIII at the Royal Shakespeare Theatre, Stratford-upon-Avon (1983)
- Pompey, Antony and Cleopatra at the National Theatre, London (1987)
- Robb Lambert, Winding the Ball by Alex Finlayson at the Royal Exchange, Manchester (1989)
- John Proctor, The Crucible by Arthur Miller at the Royal Exchange, Manchester (1990)
- Macheath, The Beggar’s Opera by John Gay at the Royal Exchange, Manchester (1991)
- Lyle Britten, Blues for Mister Charlie by James Baldwin at the Royal Exchange, Manchester (1992)
- Roy M. Cohn, Angels in America by Tony Kushner at the National Theatre, London (1993)
- Archie Rice, The Entertainer by John Osborne at the Royal Exchange, Manchester (2009)

== Personal life ==
David Schofield's wife is Lally and their children are Fred and Blanche. Schofield is a patron of the Gesar Foundation.
