= Last Passenger =

2013 British suspense thriller film by Omid Nooshin

- American theatrical release poster
- Directed by: Omid Nooshin
- Written by: Omid Nooshin; Andrew Love; Kas Graham
- Produced by: Ado Yoshizaki Cassuto; Zack Winfield
- Starring: Dougray Scott; Kara Tointon; Iddo Goldberg; David Schofield; Lindsay Duncan
- Cinematography: Angus Hudson
- Edited by: Joe Walker
- Music by: Liam Bates
- Distributed by: Kaleidoscope
- Release date: 18 October 2013
- Running time: 97 minutes
- Country: United Kingdom
- Language: English
- Budget: $2.5 million

Last Passenger is a 2013 British suspense thriller film directed by Omid Nooshin. Starring Dougray Scott, Kara Tointon and Iddo Goldberg, this film follows the man; a doctor and a widower, and their commuters' efforts to stop the train after it was discovered to have been hijacked by an unknown, mysterious driver.

== Plot ==
In December 2004, Lewis Shaler is a doctor and widower heading home with his young son Max on a late-night train from London Charing Cross to Tunbridge Wells. Max accidentally causes fellow passenger Sarah Barwell to spill coffee on her coat, prompting Shaler to apologize to her. The interaction is the beginning of a romantic connection between the two.

Later, while the train is stationary, Shaler notices an unidentifiable man wearing a high-visibility jacket walking along the outside of the train. As the train begins to move again he sees another man crawling across the tracks. On investigation, Shaler discovers the guard has vanished.

Soon after, as the train approaches Tonbridge, Barwell kisses Shaler and asks him to call her, however Shaler is distracted by the train bypassing his stop. Shaler leaves Max in the care of fellow passenger Elaine Middleton while he tries to contact the driver on the intercom. However, the driver only speaks to ask how many passengers are left on board and hangs up. Shaler and fellow passenger Peter Carmichael pull numerous emergency brake cords to no effect. It dawns on Shaler and Carmichael that the driver intends to kill himself and his passengers. Along with fellow passenger Jan Klimowski (who originally attracted suspicion as he is under the influence), they attempt to stop the train using the rear handbrake, initially with success, but are later thwarted when the driver speeds up, overwhelming it.

Carmichael is able to alert the police to the runaway train by phone, but after it continues past Tunbridge Wells, they are unable to arrive at an unbarricaded level crossing in time to prevent a vehicle being rammed full on, completely destroying it. This causes Middleton to go into cardiac arrest, and Shaler is unable to revive her. Klimowski and Shaler then attempt to break into the driver's cab using fire extinguishers; breaching the first door, they discover the guard's corpse. Shaler recognises the driver, wearing a motorcycle helmet, as a passenger he earlier saw at London Bridge. He realises that the man he saw on the tracks was the original driver, and that the man in the high-visibility jacket had tampered with the brakes before assaulting the driver. They attempt to break through the second door to no avail, and the driver responds by continuously sounding the loud horn to fend them off.

Klimowski attempts to uncouple the train carriages by climbing outside, but this dangerous gambit is cut short by an approaching single-track tunnel. Shaler saves Klimowski by pulling him back on board seconds before the train enters the tunnel. It transpires that the police have laid an ineffective blockade out of sandbags which only momentarily stops the train, and none of the passengers can open the doors due to the tunnel's narrow clearance.

Suspecting that they are now close to a deadly crash at the Hastings station buffers, Shaler creates an improvised explosive using the last remaining fire extinguisher. The explosion destroys the floor panels, allowing the rest to access and detach the coupler, but Carmichael is killed when he accidentally falls through the gap. The burning carriages separate as they speed through a suburban station where police officers watch helplessly. Shaler is left in the front car whilst Klimowski and Barwell manage to stop their carriage with the rear handbrake. With the train leaking fuel and continuing to burn around him, Shaler takes a moment to compose himself, before running and leaping from the carriage just as the entire engine explodes. It dislodges the driver's hand from the dead man's switch which immediately engages backup brakes. The remains of the train finally screech to a stop just in front of the camera and shows the headlight going off for good.

Shaler is discovered alive and conscious by Barwell, Max and Klimowski while a helicopter circles the burning train overhead. The film ends with no further exposition.

== Cast ==
- Dougray Scott as Lewis Shaler
- Kara Tointon as Sarah Barwell
- Iddo Goldberg as Jan Klimowski
- David Schofield as Peter Carmichael
- Lindsay Duncan as Elaine Middleton
- Joshua Kaynama as Max Shaler
- Samuel Geker-Kawle as Train guard

== Production ==
=== Development ===
In an interview about the film in the March 2013 issue of Vérité Magazine, Omid Nooshin said "There's a mythic resonance, being trapped in the Belly of the Whale, but there's also an existential dimension, hurtling towards the end of the line, towards certain death. I'm drawn to the work of anthropologist Ernest Becker who posited that mortality buffering actions constituted a kind of science of human behaviour."

After receiving development backing from the UK Film Council, the script was voted onto the 2008 Brit List, an industry compiled ranking of the best unproduced screenplays in the UK. However, taking the film into production required a "heroic effort" according to executive producer Kwesi Dickson. Consequently, Nooshin directed and co-produced along with producers Zack Winfield, Ado Yoshizaki and Dickson a £500 trailer to attract potential backers, filming on a heritage train on loan from the Bluebell Railway in Sussex. Todd Brown, founder of Twitch.com, wrote in March 2011 "Omid Nooshin's Last Passenger does not yet exist but it will soon. At least it will if the microbudget promo he shot for the film has anything to say about it," The trailer was instrumental in attracting the backing of Pathé, the British Film Institute and Pinewood Studios. Last Passenger went on to strong pre-sales at the 2011 Cannes Film Market, the business counterpart of the Cannes Film Festival.

Along with the £500 trailer, another key element which attracted distributors was the attachment of Dougray Scott to the lead role. Scott said of the script "It reminded me of a Hitchcock thriller where Hitchcock used to invest in the characters, so whatever happened in the story, you really cared about them because he’d spent the time for you, the audience, to get to know them." Part of Scott's character research involved training in CPR at a hospital in Brighton.

=== Pre-production ===
After realising that his preferred option of filming on 35mm wasn't affordable, Nooshin wanted to achieve the most cinematic look possible using digital cameras, and the Arri Alexa soon become his preferred choice. At this time the 4x3 Alexa had not been released, meaning Last Passenger would have to be shot at x2 anamorphic lenses on a 16x9 sensor. The film therefore became one of the first and only productions to use 2:1 anamorphics on a 16:9 sensor for a film that would be released theatrically.

Director of Photography Angus Hudson and Nooshin opted for the Cooke Xtal Express range of anamorphic lenses, originally spherical lenses from the 1930s that had been re-housed and modified with anamorphic elements in the 1980s.

The decision to use anamorphic owed as much to storytelling as to aesthetics. For budget reasons, Last Passenger used a real train as its set, but one drawback of this approach was that the crew couldn't remove any walls and therefore the camera would have to remain close to the actors. Nooshin wanted as much peripheral vision as possible to define space without losing intimacy with the actors, and anamorphic allowed this within the limited space. A custom made overhead camera dolly was built using the carriage's luggage holders. The dolly allowed for smooth camera motion throughout the carriages.

=== Filming ===
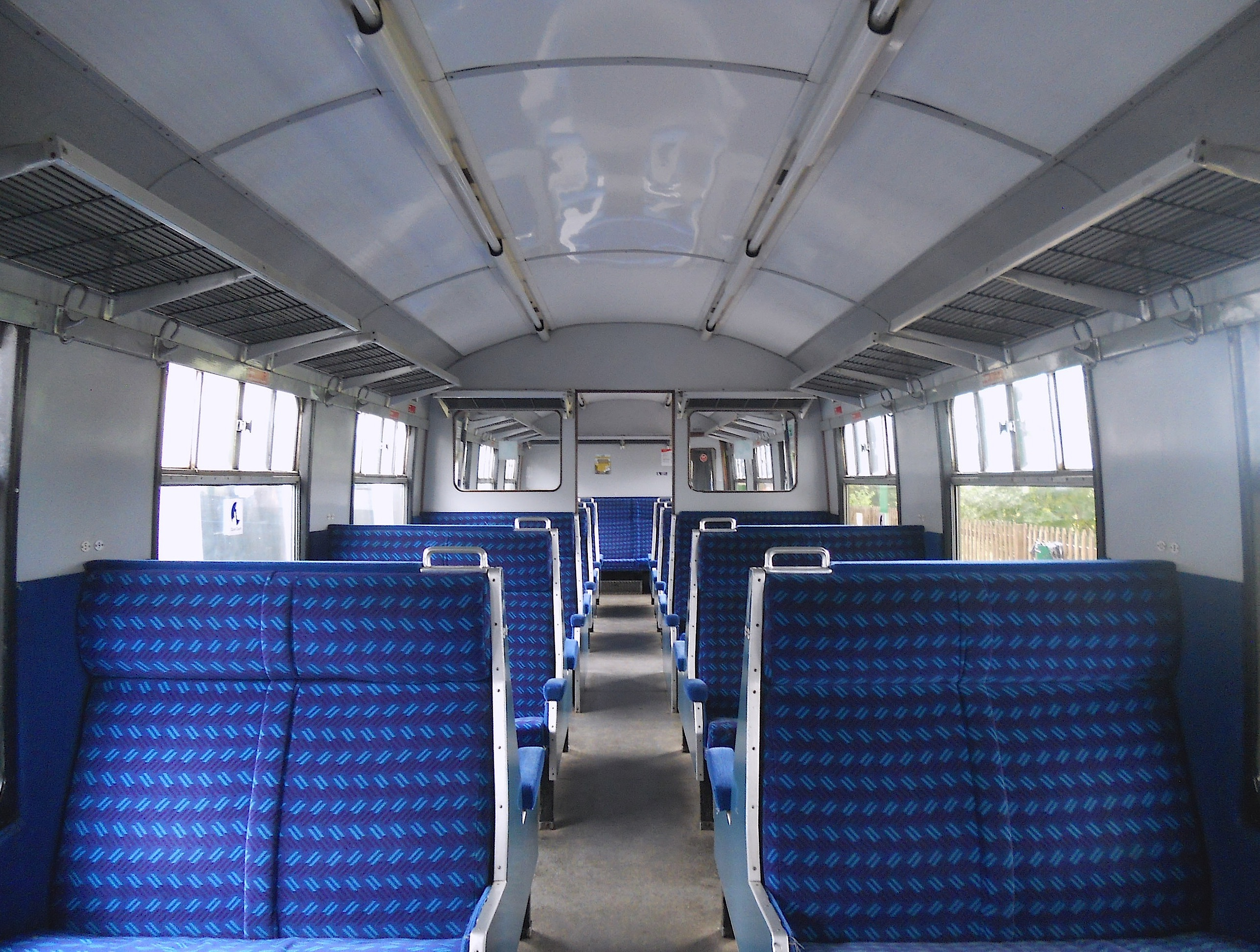
The interior of a 1966 British Rail Class 421 train carriage, used in the film

Principal photography began at Shepperton Studios' 'H' Stage, in September 2011, and lasted just 26 days, with further pick ups on the 007 stage at Pinewood studios.

The film was set on-board two Class 421 “4-CIG” EMU carriages (numbers 76747 and 62385 from unit 1399). Despite being part of an electric train, artistic licence was taken and the carriages were portrayed as diesel powered for the purpose of the storyline. The film is set in 2004 when 'slam door' trains were still in service.

Two 421 carriages, 120 feet long and weighing 90 tonnes, were delivered to Shepperton Studios and mounted on off-set hydraulic rams. Instead of using the more common technique of green screen to create the illusion of movement outside the train's windows, Nooshin designed a six screen system of rear projection, maintaining motion parallax in a near 360 degree view, something only now viable with DSLRs and digital projectors.

Some sequences however required a more complex combination of techniques. The 'train surfing' scene towards the end of the film was shot in four different locations over six months - the main bulk on Shepperton's 'H' Stage, pick-ups on Pinewood's Bond Stage and on the Bluebell Railway who are owners of a 423 unit (3417 Gordon Pettitt) which is similar design to the 421, and background plates shot from a freight train. The Last Passenger production team visited Kent & East Sussex Railway in November 2011 to shoot the carriage fire scenes at the end of the film. The level crossing crash scene was filmed using CGI, but the location was at Milford in Surrey, a bit of a distance from the Hastings Line.

In an interview about the film, editor Joe Walker claimed that part of the fun of cutting Last Passenger was seamlessly merging these disparate elements. "That’s the magic of movie making and good continuity," he says "you can try and blend these things together."

=== Editing ===
Unusually for a feature film, Last Passenger was cut on two edit systems, Final Cut Pro and Avid. Joe Walker wasn't available when principal photography was completed, and so Nooshin began editing a rough 'assembly edit' of the film on Final Cut Pro. When Walker became available and took over the editorial reins, this assembly edit had to be transferred to Avid using the laborious process of eye-matching.

=== Visual effects ===
Another unusual element of post-production was that all of the film's visual effects shots were delivered by a single VFX artist. During development, Nooshin and producer Zack Winfield traveled to Wellington to meet with Weta Workshop special effects head Richard Taylor, an avid train fanatic and supporter of the script. But with the film's budget constraints, shooting in New Zealand was deemed unfeasible. Nooshin and his producers ultimately put their faith in Tim Smit, a Dutch VFX artist who had worked on the original £500 trailer, to deliver all the digital effects shots.

=== Music ===
Liam Bates composed the film's original music after having impressed Nooshin with a temp score to the original pitch trailer, and his early involvement made possible an unconventional scoring process. Rather than wait for editing to be completed, Nooshin asked Bates to compose ideas and demos for scenes based on the script itself. These pieces then gradually evolved over the entirety of post-production, sometimes shifting in tone and location, so that when time came to record the final score with an orchestra its passages had organically found their form and placing.

Bates states on the CD cover notes "Interestingly, the music for a movie which is literally constantly on the move, required particular attention [to] the vehicle of rhythm. This element which was laid out with strongly defined pace and carefully marked tempo transitions, would become the back-bone for the steadily rising tension in the film, leaving pitch or melody to draw out the emotion surrounding the characters and their interplay."

=== Sound design ===
Sound Design was completed by Glenn Freemantle's Pinewood based Sound 24 company. In an interview about the film, Sound Effects Editor Eilam Hoffman explained how the team went about creating a language for the train so that it would become as much a character in the film as any of the passengers. A major creative choice was to use animal sounds such as lions, tigers, and cobras, morphed with the train sounds to give the locomotive an animalistic quality.

He goes on to say "It’s a lot of fun to create big explosions and loud things. It’s really nice to build dynamic sounds, starting off very quiet and then hitting you with an impact."

== Marketing ==
A found footage style teaser for the film was released in September 2013. Amateur video shows a group of teen revellers in a car driving over an open level crossing and colliding with a speeding train. The action mirrors a key moment in the film told from the point of view of the train passengers. Contactmusic.com wrote "The teaser is everything a good thriller trailer should be: intriguing, exciting...and darn scary."

== Reception ==
Last Passenger opened to a generally positive reception and currently scores 84% on Rotten Tomatoes based on 19 reviews. On Metacritic, which assigns a normalized rating out of 100 based on reviews from critics, the film has a score of 66 based on 11 reviews, considered to be "generally favorable reviews".

Gary Goldstein wrote in the LA Times that taken on its own lower budget terms Last Passenger is an "engrossing, pulse-quickening journey that deserves a wider local release than it's receiving." and added that it is "Impressively directed by Omid Nooshin". Total Film gave the film 3/5 stars, describing it as having "consistently tense, explosive action" The Hollywood Reporter wrote that "Last Passenger is a superbly executed B-movie that puts most bigger-budgeted Hollywood efforts to shame." Indiewire also wrote positively about the film saying "'Last Passenger' is a good antithesis to the overloaded and cluttered action Hollywood seems to love nowadays. If you're not feeling especially picky on plot or character, you won't go wrong with this compelling and stylish train thriller."

Writing in Sight & Sound, Kim Newman described the film as having a "pleasantly old fashioned, Brit-film feel". Mike McCahill reviewed for The Guardian, giving 3/5 stars and writing "Nooshin holds on to a strain of logic that doesn't often survive at this level of filmmaking."

Reviewers were divided however over other aspects. Charlotte O'Sullivan wrote in the Evening Standard that the film "doesn’t have the bottle to swerve genre clichés", although Short List magazine held the opposite view: "Using just a few train carriages and a handful of actors, an impressive level of suspense and claustrophobia is created, which is happily cliché-free."

Time Out was critical of the film's ending, writing "the 'who the hell’s driving this train?’ mystery element doesn’t go anywhere." Total Film however praised this element, writing that the film showed an "admirable reluctance to humanise the terrorist" adding "he’s nothing more than a shadowy, random nutter, and all the scarier for it". Similarly Brian Orndorf wrote "Instead of submitting entirely to formula, the movie attempts something seldom seen on the screen, trying to make the idea of a monster more frightening than the constant demands of one."
