= Too Good to Be True (2024 TV series) =

British television series

- Genre: Drama
- Screenplay by: Cameron McAllister; Nessah Muthy
- Story by: Megan K Fox
- Starring: Kara Tointon; Allen Leech
- Country of origin: United Kingdom
- Original language: English
- No. of series: 1
- No. of episodes: 4

Production
- Executive producers: David Collins; Sam Tipper-Hale; David Nath
- Producer: John Wallace
- Production companies: Story Films; Samson Films

Original release
- Network: Channel 5
- Release: 14 February – 22 February 2024

Too Good to Be True (also known as Captivated) is a 2024 British psychological thriller four-part drama produced for Channel 5.

== Premise ==
A single mother who works as a cleaner is offered a job working exclusively for a rich client, but finds that the job may be too good to be true.

== Cast ==
- Kara Tointon as Rachel
- Charlie Hodson-Prior as Liam
- Allen Leech as Elliot
- Sara Powell as Simone
- Taj Atwal as Jasmine
- John Thomson as Geoff

== Production ==
Originally commissioned with the title The Hunted in May 2023, the series is produced by Story Films. Executive Producers are Sam Tipper-Hale and David Nath for Story Films and David Collins for Samson Films. Megan K Fox is director and John Wallace is producer. Screenwriters are Cameron McAllister and Nessah Muthy on the four-part series. Kara Tointon and Allen Leech were confirmed in the lead cast in May 2023.

Filming for the series began in May 2023 on location in Ireland. Whilst filming in Dublin, Tointon suffered an injury when she tore her Anterior cruciate ligament in her knee during filming.

== Broadcast ==
The series was broadcast on Channel 5 in the UK from 14 February 2024. It was also broadcast on Virgin Media Television in Ireland and the Nine Network in Australia later in 2024 under the alternate title of Captivated. It was also available on Prime video in Canada under the alternate title. As Captivated, it is available on Netflix in the UK.
