= The Sound of Music Live (2015) =

British television special

The Sound of Music Live is a television special that was originally broadcast by ITV on 20 December 2015. The special was an adaptation of Rodgers and Hammerstein's 1959 Broadway musical The Sound of Music, starring Kara Tointon as Maria von Trapp, performed and televised live from 3 Mills Studios in London.

On 9 November 2018, The Sound of Music Live premiered in the United States on PBS, as part of its performing arts anthology Great Performances.

== Production ==
In October 2015, ITV announced that it would transmit a live adaptation of the musical The Sound of Music as part of its holiday programming lineup, in what would be the first time that such a programme had been attempted in the United Kingdom. The Sound of Music Live was part of ITV's continuing efforts to broadcast more live "event" programs, which are designed to attract critical masses of viewers by encouraging them to watch via the original broadcast, rather than via catch-up services and digital video recorders. The desire for increased ITV viewership came especially in the wake of declining ratings for its reality music competition The X Factor, whose series 12 finale had the second-smallest viewership in the programme's history. ITV had similarly broadcast live episodes of its series Coronation Street in 2000 and 2010 in honour of the programme's 40th and 50th anniversary respectively, and in 2015 for ITV's 60th anniversary. The production was directed live by Coky Giedroyc and Richard Valentine after six weeks of rehearsal.

This was not the first time that The Sound of Music had been adapted in such a manner. In 2013, U.S. network NBC broadcast its own live television adaptation of The Sound of Music starring country singer Carrie Underwood; similarly to ITV's version, it was an adaptation of the original musical, and not based on the film version. Although it received mixed reviews, it was seen by over 18 million viewers. As follow-ups, NBC produced similar adaptations of Peter Pan and The Wiz in 2014 and 2015 respectively. Creative director Coky Giedroyc stated that ITV's iteration would be a "whole different animal" in comparison to NBC's, explaining that she wanted to "keep it true to the original", and maintain a focus on the political aspects of the story. The production was conducted on soundstages at 3 Mills Studios in London, with the sets alone having a budget of nearly £750,000.

== Cast ==
- Kara Tointon as Maria Rainer
- Julian Ovenden as Captain Georg von Trapp
- The Children
  - Evelyn Hoskins as Liesl von Trapp
  - Guy Trundle as Friedrich von Trapp
  - Ellen Coleman as Louisa von Trapp
  - Zac Lester as Kurt von Trapp
  - Amy Snudden as Brigitta von Trapp
  - Jessica Burden as Marta von Trapp
  - Martha Otterburn as Gretl von Trapp
- Alexander Armstrong as Max Detweiler
- Maria Friedman as Mother Abbess
- Katherine Kelly as Baroness Elsa Schrader
- Jon Tarcy as Rolf Gruber
- Norma Atallah as Sister Berthe
- Julie Atherton as Sister Margareta
- Imelda de los Reyes as Sister Sophia
- David Bamber as Herr Zeller
- Paul Copley as Franz
- Mel Giedroyc as Frau Schmidt
- James Lailey as Baron Elberfeld
- Peter Vollebregt as Lieutenant Oberman

== Reception ==
The Sound of Music Live received mixed reviews. Mark Shenton of The Stage said it was a failed experiment, with "uninspired and sometimes insipid" choreography and direction, although he praised the cast's performances. Claire Allfree of The Daily Telegraph said it lacked both the intimacy of live theatre and the scope of the big screen, but nevertheless judged it "more a success than it was a failure," saying that former EastEnders star Tointon "brought a refreshing earthiness and grit to Maria that made the passionate, unconventional novice feel thoroughly modern and accessible." The Mirror said that Tointon was "showered with praise" for her performance.

The programme was watched by over 3.82 million viewers according to overnight ratings figures, being beaten by the series 11 finale of The Apprentice (5.31 million) and its lead-in, the BBC Sports Personality of the Year presentation (5.78 million).

== See also ==
- The Sound of Music Live (TV Movie) at IMDb (British broadcast, 1h 59min)
- Great Performances: The Sound of Music (2018) at IMDb (American broadcast, 2h 30min)
- 2015 in British television
