= 007 Stage =

One of the largest sound stages in the world

Coordinates: 51°33′00″N 0°32′06″W

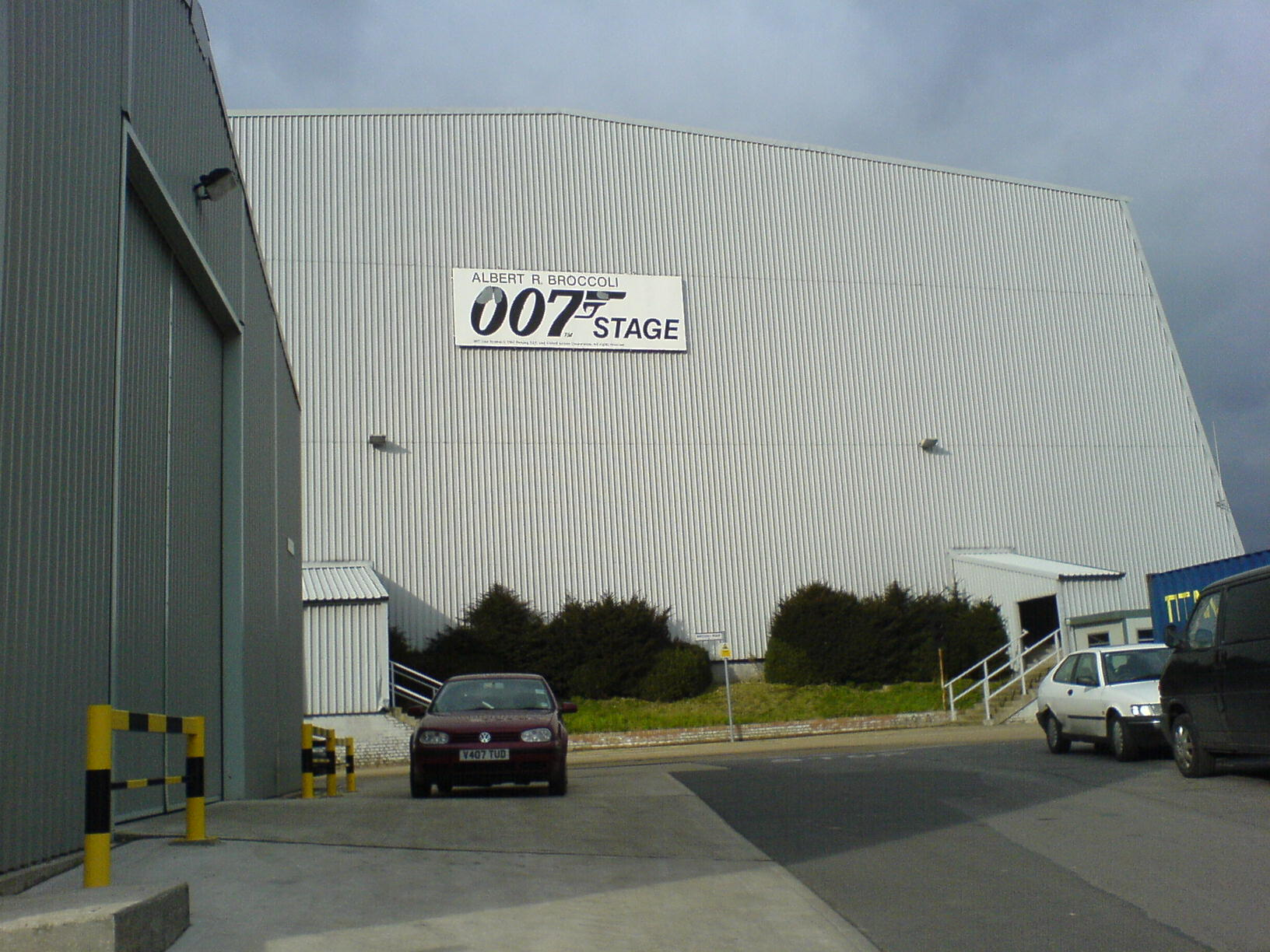
The 007 stage at Pinewood Studios in March 2006, before the July fire and rebuilding

The Albert R. Broccoli 007 Stage (originally known as and currently often shortened to simply the 007 Stage) is one of the largest sound stages in the world. Located at Pinewood Studios, Iver Heath, Buckinghamshire, England, its current name stems from James Bond film producer Albert R. "Cubby" Broccoli.

The stage was originally conceived in 1976 by production designer Ken Adam to house the set he had designed for the interior of the Liparus supertanker in the James Bond film The Spy Who Loved Me. The stage's construction cost $1.8 million.

The Rank Organisation, owner of the studio lot, agreed to allow the stage's construction, although Eon Productions and United Artists owned it as their only film production property, and hoped to recoup the cost by renting it to others; in contrast to the volcano crater set Adam had built for You Only Live Twice in 1966, the 007 Stage was to be a permanent structure. The film stage was the first built in the western world in eight years, and larger than stage "H" at Shepperton Studios, Cinecitta in Rome, and MGM Stage 15, the largest in Hollywood. During filming, Adam told American Cinematographer that other filmmakers were interested in using the new "007 Stage". During a ceremony attended by former British Prime Minister Harold Wilson, Roger Moore and other The Spy Who Loved Me actors, and many actors who had worked at Pinewood including Hayley Mills and Kenneth More, Broccoli's wife Dana christened the stage by breaking a champagne bottle on one of the submarines in the film on 5 December 1976.

The 1976 stage measured 102 by 41 metres (335 by 135 ft) and was 12.5 metres (41 ft) high. It had a maximum 4,220 square metres (45,400 sq ft) floor space. The stage featured a water tank measuring 91 by 22.5 by 2.7 metres (300 by 74 by 8.9 ft). According to 007stage.com, the water tank was an existing studio feature and the stage was created by constructing a building to completely enclose the tank. Technically, because it had no soundproofing, it was a "silent stage", the largest ever built.

The 007 Stage burnt to the ground on 27 June 1984 towards the end of filming of Ridley Scott's Legend. It was rebuilt, and reopened in January 1985, with the new name, "Albert R. Broccoli 007 Stage", in time for filming to commence on A View to a Kill (1985).

Another fire occurred on 30 July 2006. The fire occurred just after production ended on the Bond film Casino Royale while the Venetian piazza set was being dismantled. Eight fire engines took 90 minutes to bring the fire under control; a spokesman for the local fire brigade said gas canisters may have exploded inside the building. Filming had been completed on the stage several days before and it was being dismantled, so it did not delay production or release of the film. The damage to the building was extensive, causing the roof of the building to collapse. On 31 July 2006, Pinewood issued a statement indicating that the stage "will need to be demolished and rebuilt" and that there had been no casualties in the incident. The fire-damaged stage was demolished on 13–14 September. Construction on the new stage began on 18 September and was completed in under six months. The new stage was redesigned and included a number of new features including an increased working floor space area, enclosed stairwells to the gantry, a vehicle ramp into the tank, aircraft hangar-style loading doors, increased electrical power and better insulation. The new stage is 374 by 158 feet (114 by 48 m) and 41–50 feet (12–15 m) high. According to Pinewood it is the biggest soundstage in Europe at around 59,000 sq ft (5,500 m^{2}).

An explosion shot in the sound stage on 4 June 2019 during production of No Time to Die caused extensive damage to the external wall of the stage.

== Filmed in the 007 stage ==
- The Spy Who Loved Me (1977): The Liparus supertanker
- Superman: The Movie (1978) and Superman II (1980): Arctic ice floe and exterior entrance to Fortress of Solitude
- Moonraker (1979): Cable car closeups/Special effects model work for the space battle
- Superman II (1980): giant model of Metropolis streets and buildings
- Clash of the Titans (1981): Lair of the Stygian Witches and travelling matte work
- Dragonslayer (1981): exterior of dragon's lair; set built above tank so dragon could burst through the ground
- For Your Eyes Only (1981): The underwater wreck of the St. Georges
- Krull (1983): Swamp
- Octopussy (1983): Hangar explosion/Monsoon Palace courtyard and helipad for a JetRanger helicopter; helipad later removed from the "giant set" and rebuilt outside for landing and takeoff scenes of the Aérospatiale SA 360 Dauphin helicopter.
- Superman III (1983): Supercomputer cave
- Legend (1984): Forest scene
- Arena (1985): Concert film and the video for "The Wild Boys" by Duran Duran
- A View to a Kill (1985): Zorin's silicon mine, scenes of flooding
- Little Shop of Horrors (1986): Skid Row set
- The Living Daylights (1987): music video by A-Ha
- The Adventures of Baron Munchausen (1988): The South Seas
- Batman (1989): The Batcave
- Alien 3 (1992): Blast furnace
- Interview with the Vampire (1994): Theatre of the Vampires
- Mary Reilly (1996)
- Mission: Impossible (1996): Full-size TGV model filmed against green screen for Channel Tunnel chase sequence
- Event Horizon (1997): "Second Containment area" and passageway with globe and rotating spikes
- The Fifth Element (1997): Interior of spaceship, scene of the big shootout
- Tomorrow Never Dies (1997): Interior of Elliot Carver's stealth boat; also, the HMS Devonshire underwater set
- The Avengers (1998): Sir August de Wynter's weather machine
- Still Crazy (1998): Indoor concert
- Joseph and the Amazing Technicolor Dreamcoat (1999): Pharaoh scenes with big Sphinx head
- The World Is Not Enough (1999): Russian nuclear testing facility
- Lara Croft: Tomb Raider (2001): Stage divided into two: First tomb built on one side, second tomb built on the other side
- Die Another Day (2002): Gustav Graves' Ice Palace
- Lara Croft: Tomb Raider – The Cradle of Life (2003): Stage divided into two: Greek temple built on one side, African caves on the other side
- Alexander (2004): Babylon Palace on one side, Indian Palace on the other side
- Charlie and the Chocolate Factory (2005): The chocolate room with chocolate river
- The Da Vinci Code (2006): The Louvre gallery
- Casino Royale (2006): Venice piazza and interior of sinking hotel.
- Mamma Mia! (2008): Greek fishing village
- Quantum of Solace (2008): Sienese art gallery; cisterns and MI6 safehouse; sink hole; hotel elevator; three levels of walkways and staircases for ECO hotel
- Prince of Persia: The Sands of Time (2010): Alamut castle
- Pirates of the Caribbean: On Stranger Tides (2011): the Fountain of Youth
- Harry Potter and the Deathly Hallows – Part 2 (2011): The Dark Forest
- Intel Ultrabook: Egypt Commercial (2012): New York street and Egyptian street
- Prometheus (2012): Pyramid entrance, tunnels, and ampule chamber with giant statue head; set was so big that the 007 Stage had an annex added to its north side to accommodate 150 foot sloping incline towards entrance; ampule chamber later revamped to become pilot chamber with "jockey chair"
- Skyfall (2012): MI6's underground headquarters; Shanghai skyscraper atrium and offices with working elevator; underground platform; tunnels; and train crash
- Last Passenger (2013): Three days of pick-up shots.
- Jack Ryan: Shadow Recruit (2014): Water-filled "Wall Street vent facility."
- Maleficent (2014)
- Cinderella (2015): Ballroom; Cinderella's attic
- Everest (2015): Mountainous crags constructed using styrofoam and chips of soap/potato as snow, backed by huge green screens
- Spectre (2015): M's office and corridor; Palazzo Cadenza hall interior; full-scale replica of Westminster Bridge, laid with real tarmac, for full-scale helicopter crash and subsequent scenes.
- Assassin's Creed (2016): United Nations set; Abstergo complex including patient's room, hallway, recreation area, corridor and security room with exposed walls that make it look like it is built within an old Spanish church
- Emmerdale (2016), scenes of Aaron Dingle and Robert Sugden's car submerged in water.
- Star Wars: The Last Jedi (2017): Canto Bight casino
- Solo: A Star Wars Story (2018): Corellian spaceport; Mimban trenches.
- No Time to Die (2021): Mock-up of research laboratory Porton Down. Controlled explosion resulted in partial damage to stage and injury of crew member outside stage

Contrary to some sources (including IMDb), The Living Daylights did not film on the 007 Stage except for a music video by A-ha. Reports that parts of Supergirl were filmed on the 007 stage are not true. The Sulaco cargo bay set for Aliens was built on D Stage, and the frozen lake in Harry Potter and the Deathly Hallows – Part 1 was filmed on A Stage
