= Mad Heidi =

2025 Swiss comedy action film

- Directed by: Johannes Hartmann; Sandro Klopfstein
- Screenplay by: Sandro Klopfstein; Johannes Hartmann; Gregory D. Widmer; Trent Haaga
- Based on: Heidi by Johanna Spyri (uncredited)
- Produced by: Valentin Greutert; Tero Kaukomaa
- Starring: Alice Lucy; David Schofield; Casper Van Dien; Katja Kolm; Kel Matsena; Almar G. Sato; Max Rüdlinger
- Cinematography: Eric Lehner
- Edited by: Jann Anderegg; Claudio Cea; Isai Oswald
- Music by: Mario Batkovic
- Distributed by: Iron Sky
- Release date: 2022
- Running time: 92 minutes
- Country: Switzerland

Mad Heidi is a 2022 Swiss action comedy film directed by Johannes Hartmann and Sandro Klopfstein, starring Alice Lucy in the title role, David Schofield as Alpöhi and Casper Van Dien as President Meili. Timo Vuorensola, director of the two Iron Sky films, was executive producer. The film is an action reimagining of the 1881 novel Heidi by Johanna Spyri. It premiered at the Zurich Film Festival and received generally positive reviews from critics.

== Plot ==
Heidi lives in the mountains with her boyfriend Goat Peter and her grandfather Alpöhi. Goat Peter gets in the way of the Swiss president and cheese magnate Meili by selling his own cheese, which displeases the monopolist Meili. As punishment, Peter is executed in front of Heidi's eyes by Commander Knorr, Heidi is arrested and taken to a women's prison in the mountains.

There she is abused by her fellow prisoners and forced to eat the cheese of the monopolist Meili so that she can become strong to take part in the brutal wrestling festival. Heidi kills the prison warden and manages to escape. In a monastery, she develops into a rebellious Amazon, who is determined to put a stop to the cheese fascists. During one of her campaigns, she is captured and forced to participate in the wrestling festival. There she is able to defeat her opponents and, together with her grandfather and other members of the resistance movement, she kills Meili.

== Cast ==
- Alice Lucy: Heidi
- David Schofield: Alpöhi
- Casper Van Dien: President Meili
- de:Katja Kolm: Miss Rottweiler
- Kel Matsena: Goat Peter
- Almar G. Sato: de:Klara Sesemann
- de:Max Rüdlinger: Commander Knorr
- de:Werner Biermeier: Cheesemaster Kari
- Pascal Ulli: Dr. Schwitzgebel
- de:Rebecca Dyson-Smith: Lutz
- Milo Moiré: Meili's servant
- Yves Wüthrich
- Thomas Schott: Kormann Fahrer Morgensterntruck/ Musiker
- Leon Herbert: Isaac
- Philippe Schuler: French Delegate
- Patrick Slanzi: Soldier Snitch
- Grazia Pergoletti: Propaganda Lady
- Matthias Koch: Morgenstern Soldier
- Dennis Schwabenland: Soldier Strongman

== Release ==
It premiered on 7 September 2022 at the Brussels International Fantastic Film Festival, where the film won the Audience Award. At the Zurich Film Festival 2022, the production was shown as a Special Screening. The theatrical release in Germany, Austria and Switzerland was on November 24, 2022, and the film was released on the website on December 8, 2022.

== Reception ==
On Rotten Tomatoes, the film holds an approval rating of 89% based on 28 reviews. Lutz Granert gave Filmstarts.de three out of five stars. Even if the gag range could have been a bit wider, the film is fun due to many often hidden film allusions. Sandro Götz said on outnow.ch that the film entertains from the first minute and doesn't let you go until the grand finale. The film is full of funny gags and clichés about Switzerland and a parody of misguided monarchy and megalomania, even if a few Splatter scenes invite you to be disgusted. Michael Sennhauser wrote on srf.ch that the film reliably fulfils expectations and thus fulfils the central aspect of the Exploitation film. The most astonishing thing is the effortlessly casual Diversity. The fact that this is less noticeable than with glossy productions has to do with the fact that trashy exploitation cinema has always worked demographically: Give the audience what it wants, but without a message.

Sebastian Seidler, on the other hand, criticized the film on ZEIT Online as "unbearably conservative and predictable" and the most conservative fanservice, which differs in look and gesture from the Marvel superhero films of the present, but is also off-the-shelf. There are "breasts, buttocks and intestines" to see non-stop, plus "prison trash and Nazi nonsense". Rouven Linnarz rated the "very entertaining exploitation film that combines action and comedy" on film-rezensionen.de with seven out of ten points. Every shot of their film shows Hartmann and Klopfstein's great love for this genre, and in addition to a great leading actress, the production has many entertaining, bloody and hilarious moments to offer.

According to Matthias Greuling of the Wiener Zeitung, the production shines "with perfect tricks and great pictures, a simple but effective marketing concept, cheese-dripping exaggerated figures and an image of Switzerland that holds up a distorting mirror for this nation's ego".

== Awards ==
- Audience Award for Best Film at the Brussels International Fantastic Film Festival 2022
- Award for Best Feature Film at the Vancouver Horror Show 2022
- Best Feature at Screamfest 2022. New Orleans
- Best Directing at Screamfest 2022, New Orleans
