= Legend (1985 film) =

- Theatrical release poster by John Alvin
- Directed by: Ridley Scott
- Written by: William Hjortsberg
- Produced by: Arnon Milchan
- Starring: Tom Cruise; Mia Sara; Tim Curry; David Bennent; Alice Playten; Billy Barty; Cork Hubbert
- Cinematography: Alex Thomson
- Edited by: Terry Rawlings
- Music by: Tangerine Dream (US version); Jerry Goldsmith (European version and director's cut)
- Production companies: Embassy International Pictures N.V.; Legend Production Company
- Distributed by: Universal Pictures (North America); 20th Century Fox (International)
- Release dates: August 26, 1985 (Venice); August 28, 1985 (France); April 18, 1986 (United States)
- Running time: 89 minutes (US version); 93 minutes (European version); 114 minutes (director's cut)
- Country: United States
- Language: English
- Budget: $25 million
- Box office: $23.5 million

Legend is a 1985 American epic dark fantasy adventure film directed by Ridley Scott, written by William Hjortsberg, and starring Tom Cruise, Mia Sara, Tim Curry, David Bennent, Alice Playten, Billy Barty, Cork Hubbert and Annabelle Lanyon. The film revolves around Jack, a pure being (Note: In the Director's Cut, he is depicted as a flawed person in love.) who must stop the Lord of Darkness who plots to cover the world with eternal night.

Legend premiered at Venice on August 26, 1985 before being released by 20th Century Fox on August 28, 1985 in France and by Universal Pictures on April 18, 1986 in the United States. Despite its lack of commercial success and poor reception from critics, the film won the British Society of Cinematographers Award for Best Cinematography in 1985 for cinematographer Alex Thomson and was nominated for multiple awards: the Academy Award for Best Makeup; the Academy of Science Fiction, Fantasy and Horror Films Saturn Award for Best Makeup; BAFTA Awards for Best Costume Design, Best Makeup Artist, and Best Special Visual Effects; DVD Exclusive Awards; and Youth in Film Awards (since renamed Young Artist Awards). Since its premiere, reinforced by the 2002 release of the unrated Director's Cut, the film has been called a cult classic.

== Plot ==
In order to cast the world into eternal night, the Lord of Darkness sends the goblin Blix to kill the unicorns in the forest near his castle and bring him their horns. Told by Darkness that the best bait is Innocence, Blix and her colleagues Pox and Blunder follow Princess Lili as she visits her forest-dwelling paramour, Jack O' the Green. Jack teaches Lili to speak to animals, then takes her blindfolded to a forest stream where the unicorns frolic. Despite Jack's fervent warnings not to do so, Lili holds out her hand to touch the stallion. This act allows Blix to shoot him with a poison dart from her blowpipe and the unicorns flee. Jack is angry, but Lili laughs off his concern and issues a challenge by throwing her ring into a pond, declaring she will marry whoever finds it. While Jack dives in after the ring, the goblins track down the poisoned stallion and sever his horn, causing winter to descend. Lili runs off in terror, and Jack is barely able to break through the surface of the now-frozen pond.

Lili takes refuge in a peasant cottage, where she sees the goblins test the horn's magic powers and overhears how she was the bait in their slaying of the stallion. She follows the goblins to a rendezvous with Darkness, who tells them the world cannot be cast into eternal night as long as the surviving mare still lives. Blunder unsuccessfully tries using the horn to overthrow Darkness and is sent into the castle's dungeon. Meanwhile, Jack, accompanied by forest elf Honeythorn Gump, will-o'-the-wisp Fairy Oona, and dwarves Brown Tom and Screwball, finds the mare mourning the lifeless stallion. Jack begs forgiveness from the mare, who communicates to him that the horn must be recovered and returned to the stallion by a great hero. Deciding Jack is that hero, the group leaves Brown Tom to guard the unicorns while they retrieve a hidden cache of ancient weapons and armor. In their absence, Lili warns Brown Tom of the goblins coming back to kill the mare. He is then incapacitated by the goblins, who capture both Lili and the mare.

As Jack and his group make their way to Darkness' castle, they are attacked by the swamp hag Meg Mucklebones. Jack distracts her with flattery before decapitating her. At the castle, Jack's group falls into an underground prison cell where they encounter Blunder, who is revealed to be a dwarf gone astray, before he is dragged off by an ogre to be baked into a pie, and Oona, forced to reveal she is a fairy, retrieves the keys to free the others.

Darkness realizes that even he is touched by Lili's innocence and releases her to wander the castle. He leaves lavish gifts for her, including an enchanted, dancing dress that hypnotizes her. Revealing himself, Darkness asks Lili to marry him. She resists, but then agrees on the condition that she will be the one to kill the mare during the upcoming ritual. Overhearing their conversation, Jack and Gump learn Darkness can be destroyed by daylight. After saving Blunder, the group uses the ogres' giant metal platters as makeshift mirrors to reflect sunlight into the sacrificial chamber.

As the ritual begins, Lili frees the mare and Darkness strikes her unconscious. Jack fights Darkness, wounding him with the stallion's horn right before the redirected light of the sunset shines into the room, blasting Darkness to the edge of the void. Darkness warns them that because evil lurks in all beings, he will never truly be vanquished. Wavering in doubt, Jack finally severs the hand of Darkness, expelling him into the void. Gump then returns the stallion to life by magically reattaching its horn. With the stallion and mare reunited, winter immediately ends. Jack retrieves Lili's ring from the pond and places it on her finger, waking her from Darkness's spell.

=== Alternate endings ===
There are three different versions of the film's conclusion:

- In the American theatrical version, Jack and Lili assure each other of their love and watch the unicorns reunite, and they run off into the sunset together, hailed by the forest fairies and the unicorns. Darkness watches them from the void, laughing.
- The European theatrical version also ends with both Jack and Lili running off into the sunset, but without Darkness's final appearance.
- In the Director's Cut, Lili wakes with Jack trying to convince her she was merely dreaming, but she is ultimately unconvinced. They confess their true love for each other, but Lili realizes they live in two different worlds. She puts the ring on his finger and tells him to treasure it, then asks if she can come back tomorrow. Jack says he will always be there for her and Lili returns to her home and to her responsibilities. Jack happily runs off into the sunset, hailed by the forest fairies and the revived unicorns.

== Cast ==
- Tom Cruise as Jack, a forest child
- Mia Sara as Lili, a princess
- Tim Curry as Darkness
- David Bennent as Honeythorn Gump, an elf
- Alice Playten as Blix, leader of Darkness's goblins
  - Playten also provides the voice of Gump
- Billy Barty as Screwball
- Cork Hubbert as Brown Tom
- Peter O'Farrell as Pox
- Kiran Shah as Blunder
- Tina Martin as Nell
- Robert Picardo as Meg Mucklebones
- Annabelle Lanyon as Oona, a fairy

== Production ==
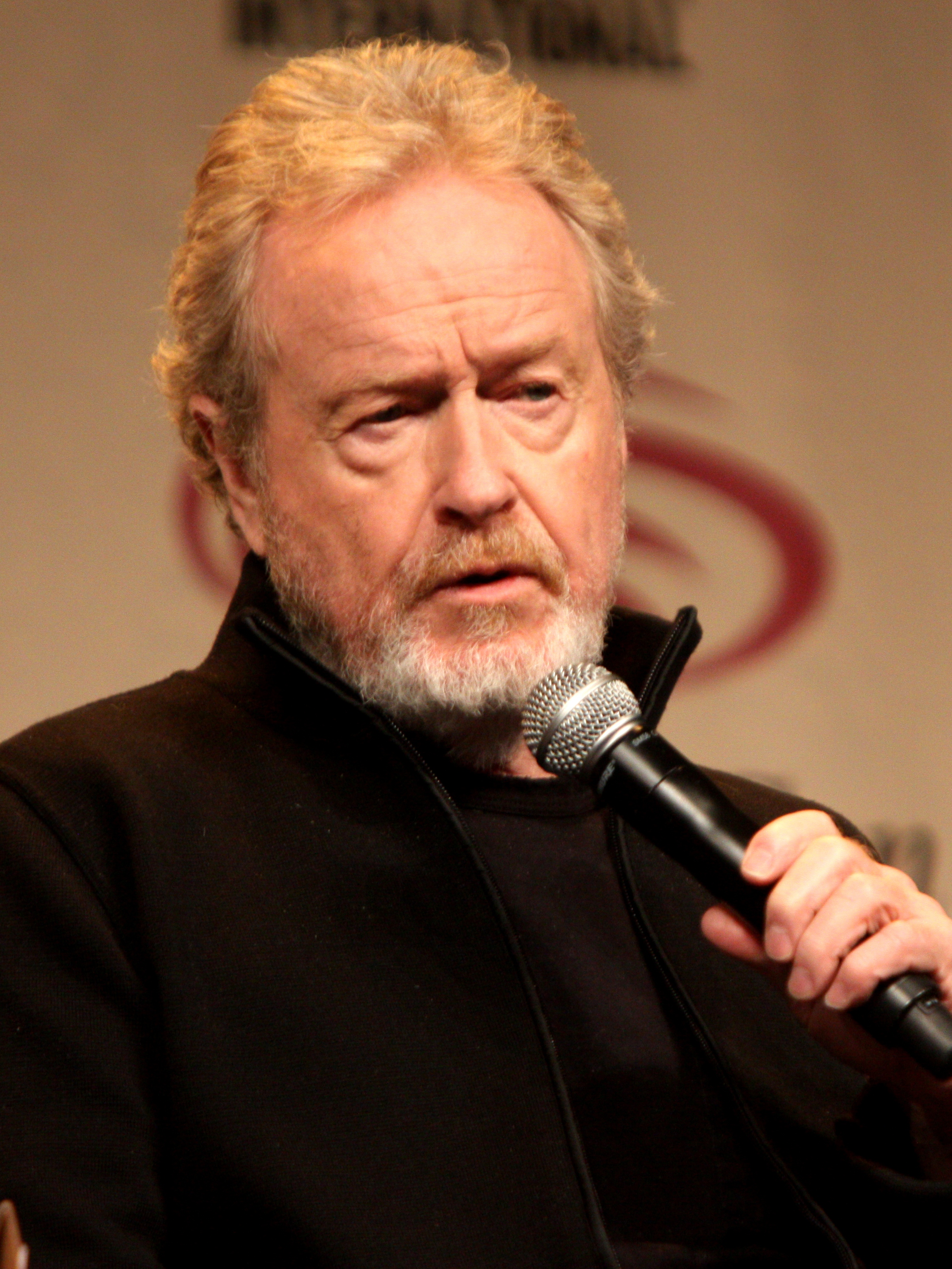
Ridley Scott in 2012

=== Development ===
While filming The Duellists in France, Ridley Scott conceived Legend after another planned project, Tristan and Isolde, fell through temporarily. However, he believed that it would be an art film with limited audience appeal and went on to make Alien and did pre-production work on Dune, another halted project, which was eventually finished by director David Lynch. Frustrated, he came back to the idea of filming a fairy tale or mythological story.

For inspiration, Scott read classic fairy tales, including ones by the Brothers Grimm. From that, he conceived a story about a young hermit who is transformed into a hero when he battles the Darkness in order to rescue a beautiful princess and release the world from a wintery curse.

=== Screenplay ===
Scott wanted Legend to have an original screenplay because he believed that "it was far easier to design a story to fit the medium of cinema than bend the medium for an established story". By chance, he discovered several books written by American novelist William Hjortsberg and found that the writer had already written several scripts for some unmade lower-budgeted films. Scott asked him if he was interested in writing a fairy tale. He was already writing some and agreed. Scott remembers: "The first notion was to actually make a classical fairy story, but if you actually analyze a classical fairy story, most are either very short, or very complex". The two men bonded over Jean Cocteau's 1946 film of Beauty and the Beast. In January 1981, just before beginning principal photography on Blade Runner, Scott spent five weeks with Hjortsberg working out a rough storyline for what was then called Legend of Darkness.

Originally, Scott "only had the vague notion of something in pursuit of the swiftest steed alive which, of course, was the unicorn". Scott felt that they should have a quest and wanted unicorns as well as magic armor and a sword. Hjortsberg suggested plunging the world into wintery darkness. Hjortsberg's first draft of Legend of Darkness also had Princess Lili slowly transform into a clawed and fur-covered beast who is whipped and sexually seduced by the antagonist (called Baron Couer De Noir in this draft).

Initially, the quest was longer, but it was eventually substantially reduced. Scott wanted to avoid too many subplots that departed from the main story and go for a "more contemporary movement rather than get bogged down in too classical a format". By the time Scott had finished Blade Runner, he and Hjortsberg had a script that was "lengthy, hugely expensive, and impractical in its size and scope". They went through it and took out large sections that were secondary to the story. The two men went through 15 script revisions.

=== Pre-production ===
The look Scott envisioned for Legend was influenced by the style of Disney animation. He had even offered the project to Disney, but they were intimidated by the film's dark tone at a time when Disney still focused on family-friendly material. Visually, Scott referenced films like Snow White and the Seven Dwarfs, Fantasia and Pinocchio. The look of Legend was also influenced by the art of Arthur Rackham and Heath Robinson. Scott had initially sought the services of conceptual designer Brian Froud, but was turned down. He then hired Alan Lee as a visual consultant, who drew some characters and sketched environments. However, Scott eventually replaced Lee with Assheton Gorton, a production designer whom he had wanted for both Alien and Blade Runner. Scott hired Gorton because he knew "all the pitfalls of shooting exteriors on a soundstage. We both knew that whatever we did would never look absolutely real, but would very quickly gain its own reality and dispense with any feeling of theatricality".

Scott also consulted with effects expert Richard Edlund because the director did not want to limit major character roles to the number of smaller people who could act. At one point, the director considered Mickey Rooney to play one of the major characters but he did not look small enough next to Tom Cruise. Edlund considered shooting on 70 mm film stock, taking the negative, and reducing the actors to any size they wanted—but this was deemed too expensive. Thus, Scott was tasked with finding an ensemble of small actors. Legend would be financed with a budget of $24.5 million, and would be distributed by Universal Pictures in North America and by 20th Century Fox in all other territories.

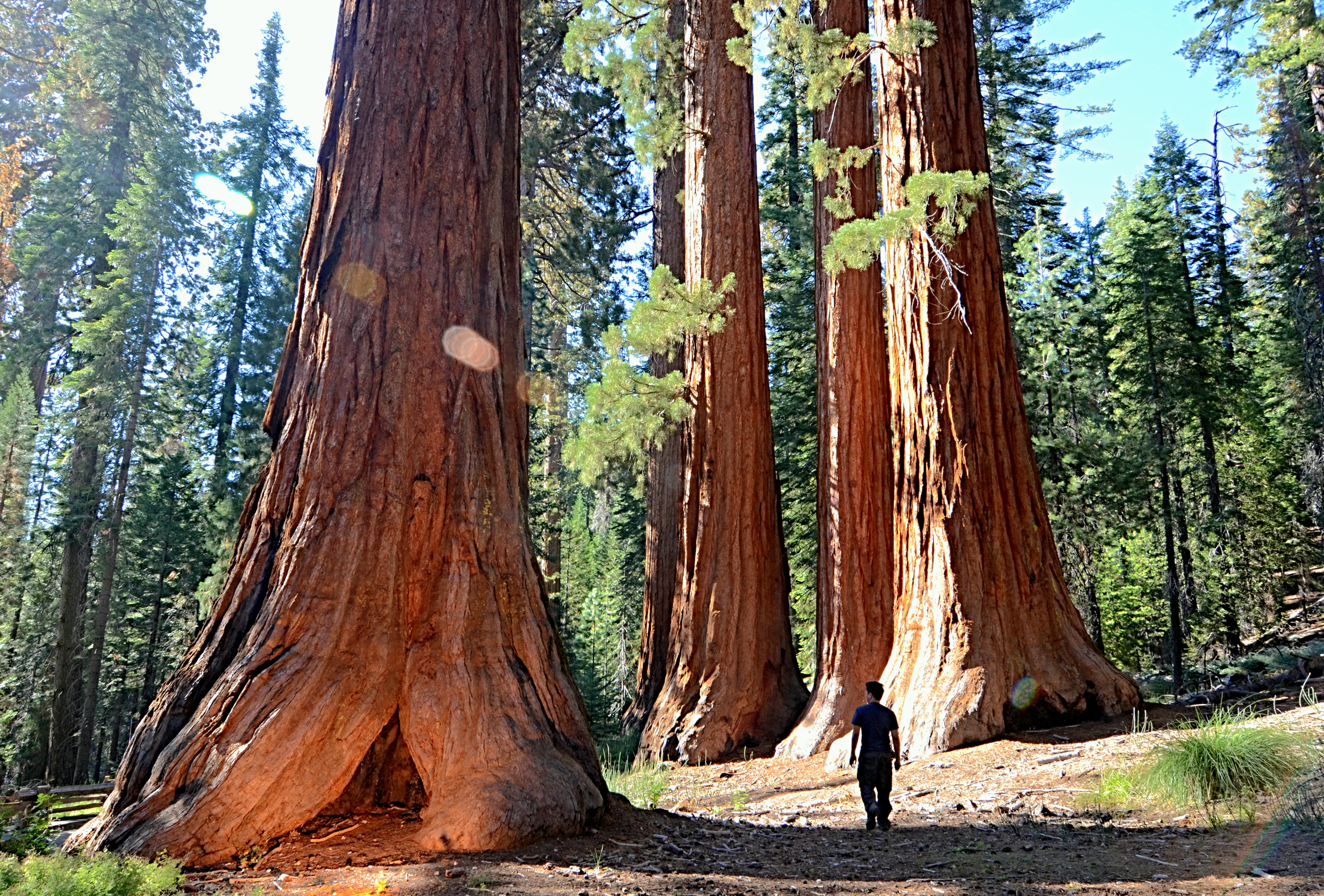
Scott was inspired by the Sequoias of Yosemite National Park

In order to achieve the look of Legend that he wanted, Scott scouted locations in the Sequoias of Yosemite National Park to see the grand scale of trees there. "The whole environment is so stunning ... It was so impressive, but I didn't know how you would control it". However, it would cost too much to shoot on location and he decided to build a forest set on the 007 Stage, named after and used for many James Bond films, at Pinewood Studios. The crew spent 14 weeks constructing the forest set, and Scott was worried that it would not look real enough. It was only days before the start of principal photography that it looked good enough to film. The trees were 60 feet high with trunks 30 feet in diameter and were sculpted out of polystyrene built onto tubular scaffolding frames. In addition, other sets were constructed on five huge soundstages.

=== Casting ===
Johnny Depp, Jim Carrey and Robert Downey Jr. were considered for the role of Jack. Scott was considering Richard O'Brien to play Meg Mucklebones, and re-watched his appearance in The Rocky Horror Picture Show; he saw Tim Curry in that film, and thought he would be ideal to play Darkness because he had both film and theatrical experience. Scott discovered Mia Sara in a casting session and was impressed by her "good theatrical instincts".

=== Makeup effects ===
Scott contacted Rob Bottin, who designed the special makeup effects for The Howling, about working on Blade Runner, but Bottin was already committed to John Carpenter's The Thing. Scott told him about Legend, and toward the end of production on The Thing, Bottin read a script for the film and saw an excellent opportunity to create characters in starring roles.

After wrapping his work with Carpenter, Bottin met with Scott to reduce the thousands of creatures suggested by the script to a manageable quantity. The process would involve complicated prosthetic makeup that would be worn for up to 60 days with some full body prosthetics. According to Bottin, at the time, Legend had the largest makeup crew ever dedicated to one project. Bottin divided his facility into different shops in order to cover the immense workload. As actors were cast, Bottin and his crew began making life casts and designed characters on drafting paper laid over sketches of the actors' faces. He designed the prosthetics in his Los Angeles studio and spent some time in England occasionally helping with the application of makeup.

Curry's makeup for the film took five and a half hours to apply.

With the exception of Cruise and Sara, all the principal actors spent hours every morning having extensive makeup applied. Between 8 and 12 prosthetic pieces were applied individually to each face, then made up, molded and grafted into the actor's face so that the prosthetics moved with their muscles. Each person needed three makeup artists working on them for an average time of three and a half hours spent applying prosthetics. Actor Tim Curry took five and a half hours because his entire body was encased in makeup, the film's most challenging character design. His makeup as Darkness is considered to be one of the most iconic images in all of fantasy cinema.

Curry had to wear a large, bull-like structure atop his head with three-foot fiberglass horns supported by a harness underneath the makeup. The initial design of the horns placed a strain on the back of the actor's neck because they extended forward and not straight up but Bottin and his crew eventually reduced the weight of the horns. At the end of the day, he spent an hour in a bath in order to liquefy the soluble spirit gum. At one point, Curry became claustrophobic, got too impatient, and pulled the makeup off too quickly, tearing off his own skin in the process. Scott had to shoot around the actor for a week as a result.

=== Principal photography ===
Principal photography began on March 26, 1984, on the 007 Stage at Pinewood Studios. On June 27, 1984, with ten days filming left on this stage, the entire set burned down during a lunch break. Reportedly, flames from the set fire leapt more than 100 feet into the air and the clouds of smoke could be seen five miles away. It occurred during lunchtime, and no one was hurt. Scott quickly made changes to the shooting schedule and only lost three days moving to another soundstage. Meanwhile, the art department rebuilt the section of the forest set that was needed to complete filming. Due to the fire, the scenes of Lili meeting the unicorns for the first time and finding the cottages in the snow were filmed in the garden of the main house behind Shepperton Studios. The underwater scenes were filmed in Silver Springs, Florida for the "purity" of the water. Cruise did all his own diving and swimming in waters that, according to Scott, had real alligators 25 feet from where they were filming.

=== Post-production ===
Scott's first cut of Legend ran 125 minutes long. He then believed there were minor plot points that could be trimmed and cut the film down to 113 minutes, so he tested this version for an audience in Orange County. However, it was decided that the audience had to work too much to be entertained, and another 20 minutes was cut. The 95-minute version was shown in Great Britain and then the film was cut down even further to 89 minutes for North America.

At the time, Scott said "European audiences are more sophisticated. They accepted preambles and subtleties whereas the U.S. goes for a much broader stroke." He and Universal delayed the North American theatrical release until 1986 so that they could replace Jerry Goldsmith's score with music by Tangerine Dream, Yes lead singer Jon Anderson, and Bryan Ferry.

Scott allowed Goldsmith's score to remain on European prints and the composer said "that this dreamy, bucolic setting is suddenly to be scored by a techno-pop group seems sort of strange to me". Normally, Goldsmith would spend 6–10 weeks on a film score, but for Legend, he spent six months writing songs and dance sequences ahead of time.

In 2000, Universal unearthed an answer print of the 113-minute preview cut with Jerry Goldsmith's score. This print had minor visual anomalies that were eventually digitally replaced, occasionally with finished shots from the 89-minute U.S. version. This edition is Scott's preferred 2002 "Director's Cut", with the restored Jerry Goldsmith soundtrack. The Director's Cut's source is one of only two prints of this extended version known to exist, used for Universal's 2002 DVD (and eventual Blu-ray) "Ultimate Edition".

== Reception ==
=== Critical response ===
On the review aggregator website Rotten Tomatoes, 34% of 109 critics' reviews are positive, with an average rating of 4.9/10. The website's consensus reads: "Not even Ridley Scott's gorgeously realized set pieces can save Legend from its own tawdry tale -- though it may be serviceable for those simply looking for fantasy eye candy." Metacritic, which uses a weighted average, assigned the film a score of 31 out of 100, based on 11 critics, indicating "generally unfavorable" reviews. Audiences polled by CinemaScore gave the film an average grade of "C+" on an A+ to F scale.

Positive reviews included Steve Biodrowski of Cinefantastique, who highlighted the makeup design by Rob Bottin and Tim Curry's performance as Darkness, saying that "[b]ecause of the visuals (and Curry's performance, which is mostly limited to the last 20 minutes), the film is worth seeing". Widgett Walls of needcoffee.com also praised the film, once again highlighting Bottin's makeup, focusing on the character of Darkness, saying simply that "Tim Curry's Darkness is absolutely incredible."

Less favorable reviews included Neil Gaiman's in Imagine magazine, stating that "Glimmers of intelligence show here and there in the script, suggesting that William Hjortsberg... [understood] that fairies are wilful, capricious creatures... but if you go and see the film don't say I didn't warn you." Vincent Canby of The New York Times felt it was "a slap-dash amalgam of Old Testament, King Arthur, "The Lord of the Rings" and any number of comic books", and that the real star was actually production designer Assheton Gorton, who compensated by creating sets "that keep the eye busier than the mind or the heart."

Gene Siskel of the Chicago Tribune gave the film half of one star out of four and stated that writing the review was "akin to recalling a bad dream", concluding that "I don't want to remember any more about Legend than to make sure I include it in my 'worst films of 1986' list and never rent it when it comes out as a video cassette." Roger Ebert of the Chicago Sun-Times gave the film two stars out of four, saying that the movie was composed of all of the right ingredients to be successful but that the film simply "doesn't work". He went on to say that "[a]ll of the special effects in the world, and all of the great makeup, and all of the great Muppet creatures can't save a movie that has no clear idea of its own mission and no joy in its own accomplishment".

John Nubbin reviewed Legend for Different Worlds magazine and stated that "See this one if you can, especially if you can see it on a big screen. If not, rent it, and try to imagine that it looked like the size of a building, and with all of its parts to show you. As in all fantasy, it never hurts to use your imagination."

In 2015, the film was described in The Daily Telegraph as the "extinction event" that discouraged Hollywood from making fantasy films.

=== Box office ===
Legend grossed $15.5 million in the United States and Canada, and $8.0 million in other territories, for a worldwide total of $23.5 million, against a budget of $25 million. In the United States and Canada, it spent its first two weeks at No. 1, of three weeks overall in the Top 10 at the box office. In France and Germany it sold, respectively, 765.156 and 160.193 admissions, for an unspecified amount of money. In Spain it sold 159.448 admissions during 1985 (for 54.884.813 pesetas), and another 426.484 admissions during 1986 (for 117.322.992 pesetas); through periodical re-issues by its distributor, total gross in that country by the end of the decade amounted to 191.403.315 pesetas (which, at the exchange rate of the time, converted into $1.4M).

== Soundtrack ==
Because of the changes in the film from its European and American releases, Legend has two different soundtracks. The first, composed, conducted and produced by Jerry Goldsmith, was used for its initial European release and restored in the director's cut edition of the Region 1 DVD release. The second soundtrack features music by German electronic artists Tangerine Dream and was used for the initial theatrical and home video releases in the United States. This soundtrack also includes songs by Jon Anderson of Yes and Bryan Ferry of Roxy Music.

The following songs are featured in the European and director's cuts, with lyrics composed by John Bettis (composer of many Carpenters songs) and music by Jerry Goldsmith:

- "My True Love's Eyes" (the main theme, sung mostly by Lili. Mia Sara provided some of the singing, while session singers provided vocals wherever Sara was unable to perform).
- "Living River" (the first reprise of "My True Love's Eyes", sung as Lili calls to the unicorn).
- "Bumps and Hollows" (sung by Lili after her forbidden act of touching a unicorn).
- "Sing the Wee" (the theme for the fairies. The first sung version was cut from all editions of the film as it accompanied a scene with Jack and the fairies that was itself cut; the final sung version by the National Philharmonic Chorus is heard over the end credits).
- "Reunited" (the final reprise of "My True Love's Eyes", sung by Lili as she says goodbye to Jack).

The following songs appeared in the 89-minute U.S. re-cut when it was re-scored by Tangerine Dream:

- "Loved by the Sun" (music by Tangerine Dream, lyrics written and sung by Jon Anderson).
- "Is Your Love Strong Enough" (written and performed by Bryan Ferry over the U.S. print's end credits).

A promotional music video (presumably for the U.S. market, where the Tangerine Dream soundtrack was used) was created for the Bryan Ferry song "Is Your Love Strong Enough". The video, which incorporates Ferry and guitarist David Gilmour into footage from the film, is included as a bonus on disc 2 of the 2002 "Ultimate Edition" DVD release.

== Home media ==
In the 1980s, Warner Home Video released Legend on VHS in the United Kingdom.

In 2002, Universal released the 113-minute Director's Cut on Region 1 DVD, restoring previously cut scenes and the original Goldsmith score.

The Director's Cut was a nightmare to track down. In doing research on this, I had been in contact with a certifiable Legend fanatic named Sean Murphy, who runs the Legend FAQ along with Geoff Wright, and based in part on his info, and a lot of background from Legend editor, Terry Rawlings, I realized that we were looking for one of three cuts. ... Credit really needs to be given to Garth Thomas for breaking the case. And I should also thank Sean Murphy, Geoff Wright, and Paul MacLean for all of their support.

— Charles de Lauzirika, Producer

Universal released a Blu-ray version of the "Ultimate Edition" on May 31, 2011. With the exception of the 2002 DVD-ROM features, this disc carries over all the content from the DVD, including the Jerry Goldsmith-scored "Director's Cut" and the Tangerine Dream-scored theatrical version.

In September 2021, the film was reissued yet again by Arrow Films (under license from Universal) as a 2-disc "Limited Edition" including the two major cuts of the movie (theatrical and Director's Cuts with their respective corresponding scores), with nearly all the bonus content from the previous Universal releases, plus new documentaries on the film. The International Version was not included on this new set as the rights to that edition are held by The Walt Disney Company (via the library of 20th Century Studios).

== See also ==
- The Last Unicorn
- Krull
- Labyrinth
