= The Man in the White Suit (play) =

Play by Sean Foley

- Original language: English
- Written by: Sean Foley
- Based on: The Man in the White Suit (1951 film) by John Dighton, Roger MacDougall, Alexander Mackendrick
- Genre: Comedy

Premiere
- Date: 6 September 2019
- Place: Theatre Royal, Bath

The Man in the White Suit is a play by Sean Foley, based on the 1951 Ealing film by Alexander Mackendrick, John Dighton and Roger MacDougall.

== Production ==
The play made its world premiere at the Theatre Royal, Bath from 6 to 21 September 2019 before transferring to the Wyndham's Theatre in London's West End beginning previews from 25 September, official opening night on 8 October 2019. It was directed by Foley, designed by Michael Taylor with music by Noah and the Whale's Charlie Fink and starred Stephen Mangan as Sidney Stratton, Kara Tointon as Daphne Birnley and Sue Johnston as Mrs Watson.

The production was due to run until 11 January 2020, however due to poor ticket sales it closed early on 7 December 2019.

== Cast and characters ==
Character	Bath / London
Character	2019
Sidney Stratton	Stephen Mangan
Daphne Birnley	Kara Tointon
Mrs Watson	Sue Johnston
Alan Birnley	Richard Cordery
Sir John Kierlaw	Richard Durden
Jimmy Rigton	Matthew Durkan
Michael Corland	Ben Deery
Brenda Highthorpe	Rina Fatania
Knudson/Hill	Eugene McCoy
Babs/Nurse Gammidge	Katie Bernstein
Hoskyns	Delroy Atkinson
Bill Wilkins/Anderson	Oliver Kaderbhai
Ensemble	Elliott Rennie; Katherine Toy
