= Kill Switch (2017 film) =

2017 American-Dutch science fiction film directed by Tim Smit

- Theatrical release poster
- Directed by: Tim Smit
- Written by: Charlie Kindiger; Omid Nooshin
- Produced by: Aaron Ryder; Sander Verdonk; Denis Wigman
- Starring: Dan Stevens; Bérénice Marlohe; Tygo Gernandt; Charity Wakefield; Bas Keijzer; Mike Libanon; Mike Reus
- Cinematography: Jaco van Ree
- Edited by: Wouter van Luijn
- Music by: Dries Bijlsma; Rob Peters; Don Diablo
- Production companies: FilmNation Entertainment; SquareOne Entertainment; RainMaker Films; CTM Productions
- Distributed by: Saban Films (United States); Entertainment One (Netherlands)
- Release date: June 16, 2017 (United States)
- Running time: 91 minutes
- Countries: United States; Netherlands
- Language: English
- Box office: $163,348

Kill Switch (also known as Redivider) is a 2017 science fiction film, directed by Tim Smit in his directorial debut, from a screenplay by Charlie Kindinger and Omid Nooshin. It stars Dan Stevens as Will Porter, a former NASA pilot-turned-physicist recruited to reverse the damages of harnessing unlimited quantum energy, at the cost of either one of two universes colliding. Bérénice Marlohe, Tygo Gernandt, Charity Wakefield, Bas Keijzer, Mike Libanon, and Mike Reus also star.

The film was released on June 16, 2017 by Saban Films to negative reviews from critics.

== Plot ==
Sometime in the near future, physicist and former NASA pilot Will Porter is recruited by Alterplex, a power company that has built a massive tower that taps into unlimited quantum energy. It is revealed that it is destroying a mirror universe Earth referred to as "The Echo" and that the inhabitants there also have an energy tower. Strange gravity anomalies and unexplained deaths are occurring in The Echo world that are blamed on the tower, as it takes energy from that world. There was supposed to be no life there but due to a malfunction, the device created a true mirror Earth full of life, and now both Earths face destruction unless one is destroyed within less than a day.

Porter has been sent to The Echo with a cube device called the "Redivider" believing it will balance the power transfer between the two universes and set things right. Instead, he learns the device is a kill switch that will destroy The Echo forcing him to decide which universe to sacrifice in order to save the other. The armies in The Echo know this and are trying to arrest or kill him. There is also a group of "anti-tower rebels" who are actively fighting the armed forces of the towers.

== Cast ==
- Dan Stevens as Will Porter
- Bérénice Marlohe as Abigail Vos
- Tygo Gernandt as Michael
- Charity Wakefield as Mia Porter
- Gijs Scholten van Aschat as Reynard
- Bas Keijzer as Bektman
- Mike Libanon as Hugo
- Mike Reus as Dr. Klintsen

== Production ==
In February 2016, it was announced Dan Stevens and Bérénice Marlohe had been cast in the film, with Tim Smit directing the film, from a screenplay by Charlie Kindinger and Omid Nooshin. Aaron Ryder served as a producer on the film under his FilmNation Entertainment banner.

Don Diablo wrote, scored and performed in the film's theme song, "Echoes".

== Release ==
In February 2017, Saban Films acquired the distribution rights to the film. It was theatrically released on June 16, 2017 and on VOD by Lionsgate Home Entertainment on August 22, 2017.

== Reception ==
=== Box office ===
Kill Switch grossed a worldwide total of $163,348. Sales of its DVD/Blu-ray releases cashed $140,269.

=== Critical response ===
On review aggregator Rotten Tomatoes, the film holds an approval rating of 9% based on 22 reviews, with an average rating of 4.5/10. On Metacritic, the film holds a weighted average score of 31 out of 100, based on 8 critics, indicating "generally unfavorable" reviews.
