= Omid Nooshin =

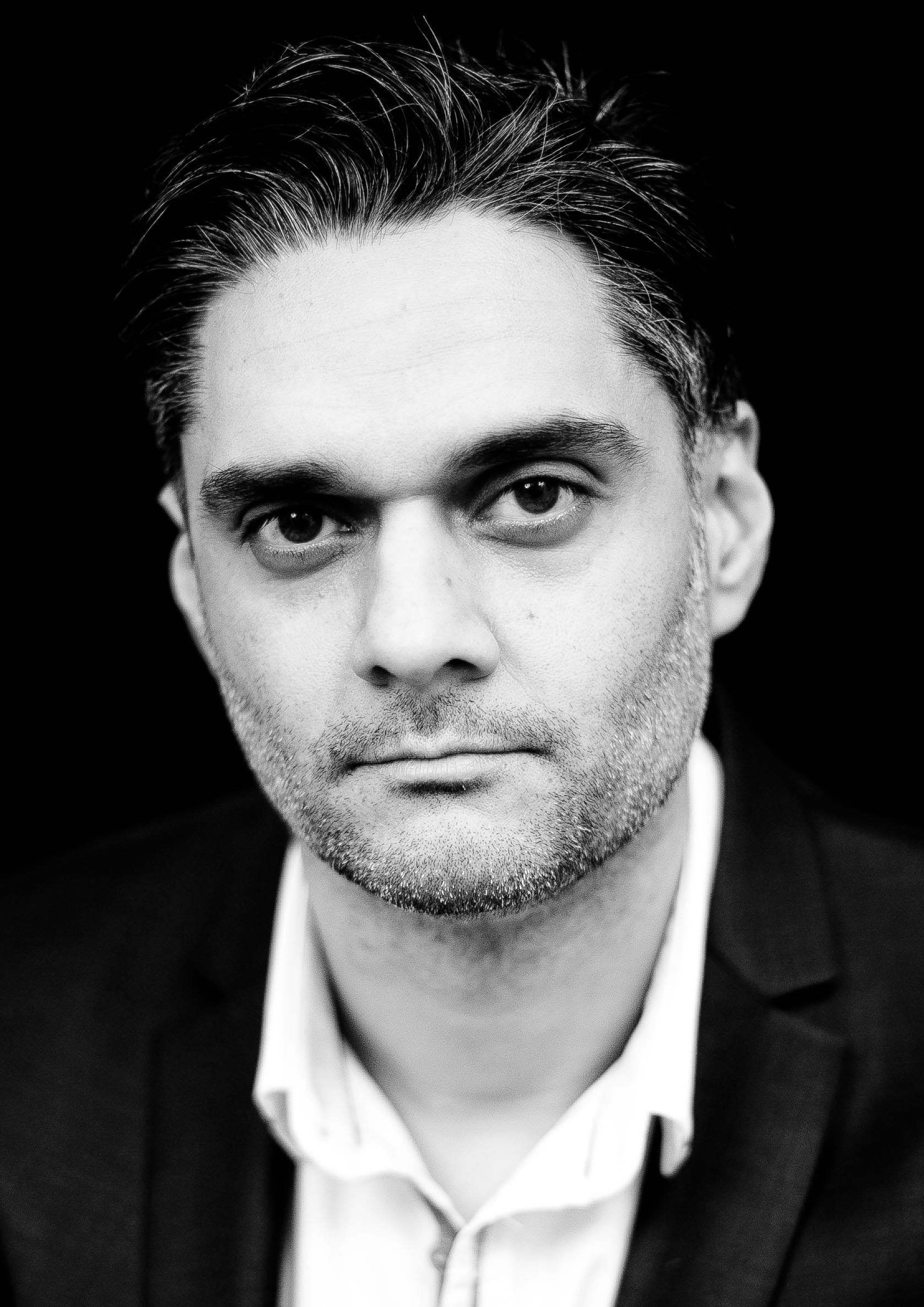
- Omid Nooshin
- Born: Omid Nooshin; 2 May 1974; Guildford, Surrey, England, UK
- Died: 15 January 2018 (aged 43); London England, UK
- Occupation: Director
- Years active: 1994–2017

Omid Nooshin (2 May 1974 – 15 January 2018) was an English film director and writer. He was best known for his debut independent feature film Last Passenger.

== Early life ==
Nooshin was born in Guildford, Surrey, in 1974, the son of Hoshyar Nooshin, Emeritus Professor of Space Structures at Surrey University. He cites Star Wars as his inspiration to begin making short films at the age of 11, and wrote his first feature film outline whilst studying for his maths A-level at Christ’s College School, Guildford. He went on to study film at the University for the Creative Arts, Farnham.

== Early career ==
Upon graduation, Nooshin began making short films and commercials. During this time he took every opportunity to get close to film production, gatecrashing the sets of Stanley Kubrick’s Eyes Wide Shut and George Lucas’ Star Wars: Episode I – The Phantom Menace. In the late 1990s, Nooshin travelled to New York and spent much of his time at famed method acting institute The Actor’s Studio, watching others including Arthur Penn take drama classes. In 1999, his short film Panic, based on a true story of a carjacking gone awry, played at several international film festivals and opened doors with industry executives in London and Los Angeles. Soon after, Nooshin began writing feature scripts and signed with talent agency CAA.

== Breakthrough ==
In 2008 Nooshin's script for Last Passenger was voted onto the Brit List of favourite unproduced British screenplays. In 2011 it was made into a film starring Dougray Scott, for which Nooshin received a nomination for the Douglas Hickox Award For Best Debut Director at The British Independent Film Awards. Constrained by a low budget, Nooshin's determination to nevertheless achieve the most cinematic look possible using digital cameras resulted in the film becoming one of the first and only productions to use 2:1 anamorphic lenses on a 16:9 aspect ratio sensor for a film that would be released theatrically.

In a 2013 interview for his former college Nooshin expressed his view that "The film industry is built on a cultural fault line where the tectonic plates of art and commerce meet. As a filmmaker you should anticipate and be prepared to tough out frequent tremors and the occasional earthquake."

== Death ==
Nooshin died suddenly on 15 January 2018 at the age of 43.

== Filmography ==
=== Feature films ===
- Last Passenger (2013) (writer, director)
- Kill Switch (also known as Redivider) (2016) (co-writer)

=== Short films ===
- Panic (1999) (writer, director, composer, actor, producer)
- Rooftop (1996) (writer, director, composer, producer)
